= List of Atlanta Hawks head coaches =

The Atlanta Hawks are an American professional basketball team based in Atlanta, Georgia. They play in the Southeast Division of the Eastern Conference in the National Basketball Association (NBA). The team began playing in 1946 as a member of the National Basketball League (NBL), and joined the NBA in 1949. The team has had five names since its inception; the Buffalo Bisons (1946), the Tri-Cities Blackhawks (1946–1951), the Milwaukee Hawks (1951–1955), the St. Louis Hawks (1955–1968), and the Atlanta Hawks (1968–present). The Hawks won their only NBA championship in 1958, and have not returned to the NBA Finals since 1960. The team has played its home games at State Farm Arena since 1999.

There have been 30 head coaches for the Hawks franchise since joining the NBA. The team's first head coach while in the NBA was Roger Potter, who coached for seven games. Richie Guerin, who coached the Hawks for eight seasons, is the franchise's all-time leader in regular-season games coached (618), regular-season games won (327), playoff games coached (60), and playoff games won (26). Alex Hannum is the only head coach to have won an NBA championship with the Hawks, doing so in the 1958 NBA Finals. Five Hawks coaches have won the NBA Coach of the Year Award, four have been elected into the Basketball Hall of Fame as coaches, and three were listed among the Top 10 Coaches in NBA History in 1996. The current head coach is Quin Snyder.

== Key ==
GC	Games coached
W	Wins
L	Losses
Win%	Winning percentage
#	Number of coaches^{[a]}
*	Spent entire NBA head coaching career with the Hawks
†	Elected into the Basketball Hall of Fame as a coach

== Coaches ==
Note: Statistics are correct through April 13, 2026. This list does not include NBL seasons.

#	Name	Term^{[b]}	GC	W	L	Win%	GC	W	L	Win%	Achievements	Reference
#	Name	Term^{[b]}	Regular season				Playoffs				Achievements	Reference
Tri-Cities Blackhawks
1	Roger Potter*	1949	7	1	6	.143	—	—	—	—		
2	Red Auerbach†	1949–1950	57	28	29	.491	3	1	2	.333	One of the top 10 coaches in NBA history (1996)	
3	Dave MacMillan*	1950	23	9	14	.391	—	—	—	—		
4	Johnny Logan*	1950 (as player-coach)	3	2	1	.667	—	—	—	—		
5	Mike Todorovich*	1950–1951 (as player-coach)	42	14	28	.333	—	—	—	—		
Milwaukee Hawks
6	Doxie Moore	1951–1952	66	17	49	.258	—	—	—	—		
7	Andrew Levane	1952–1953 (as player-coach); 1953–1954	117	38	79	.325	—	—	—	—		
8	Red Holzman†	1954 (as player-coach); 1954–1955	98	36	62	.367	—	—	—	—	One of the top 10 coaches in NBA history (1996)	
St. Louis Hawks
—	Red Holzman†	1955–1956	105	47	58	.448	9	4	5	.444	One of the top 10 coaches in NBA history (1996)	
9	Slater Martin	1957 (as player-coach)	8	5	3	.625	—	—	—	—		
10	Alex Hannum†	1957 (as player-coach); 1957–1958	103	56	47	.544	23	16	7	.696	NBA championship (1957–58)	
11	Andy Phillip*	1958	10	6	4	.600	—	—	—	—		
12	Ed Macauley*	1958–1959 (as player-coach); 1959–1960	137	89	48	.650	20	9	11	.450		
13	Paul Seymour	1960–1961	93	56	37	.602	12	5	7	.417		
—	Andrew Levane	1961–1962	60	20	40	.333	—	—	—	—		
14	Bob Pettit*	1962 (as player-coach)	6	4	2	.667	—	—	—	—		
15	Harry Gallatin	1962–1964	193	111	82	.575	23	12	11	.522	1962–63 NBA Coach of the Year	
16	Richie Guerin*	1964–1968 (as player-coach)	290	159	131	.548	29	14	15	.483	1967–68 NBA Coach of the Year	
Atlanta Hawks
—	Richie Guerin*	1968–1972	328	168	160	.512	31	12	19	.387	1967–68 NBA Coach of the Year	
17	Cotton Fitzsimmons	1972–1976	320	140	180	.438	6	2	4	.333		
18	Bumper Tormohlen*	1976	8	1	7	.125	—	—	—	—		
19	Hubie Brown	1976–1981	407	199	208	.489	16	6	10	.375	1977–78 NBA Coach of the Year	
20	Mike Fratello	1981	3	0	3	.000	—	—	—	—		
21	Kevin Loughery	1981–1983	164	85	79	.518	5	1	4	.200		
—	Mike Fratello	1983–1990	574	324	250	.564	40	18	22	.450	1985–86 NBA Coach of the Year	
22	Bob Weiss	1990–1993	246	124	122	.504	8	2	6	.250		
23	Lenny Wilkens†	1993–2000	542	310	232	.572	47	17	30	.362	1993–94 NBA Coach of the Year; One of the top 10 coaches in NBA history (1996)	
24	Lon Kruger*	2000–2002	191	69	122	.361	—	—	—	—		
25	Terry Stotts	2002–2004	137	52	85	.380	—	—	—	—		
26	Mike Woodson	2004–2010	492	206	286	.419	29	11	18	.379		
27	Larry Drew	2010–2013	230	128	102	.557	24	10	14	.417		
28	Mike Budenholzer	2013–2018	410	213	197	.520	29	15	14	.517	2014–15 NBA Coach of the Year	
29	Lloyd Pierce*	2018–2021	183	63	120	.344	—	—	—	—		
30	Nate McMillan	2021–2023	179	99	80	.553	23	11	12	.478		
31	Joe Prunty	2023	2	2	0	1.000	—	—	—	—		
32	Quin Snyder	2023–present	267	132	135	.494	6	2	4	.333		

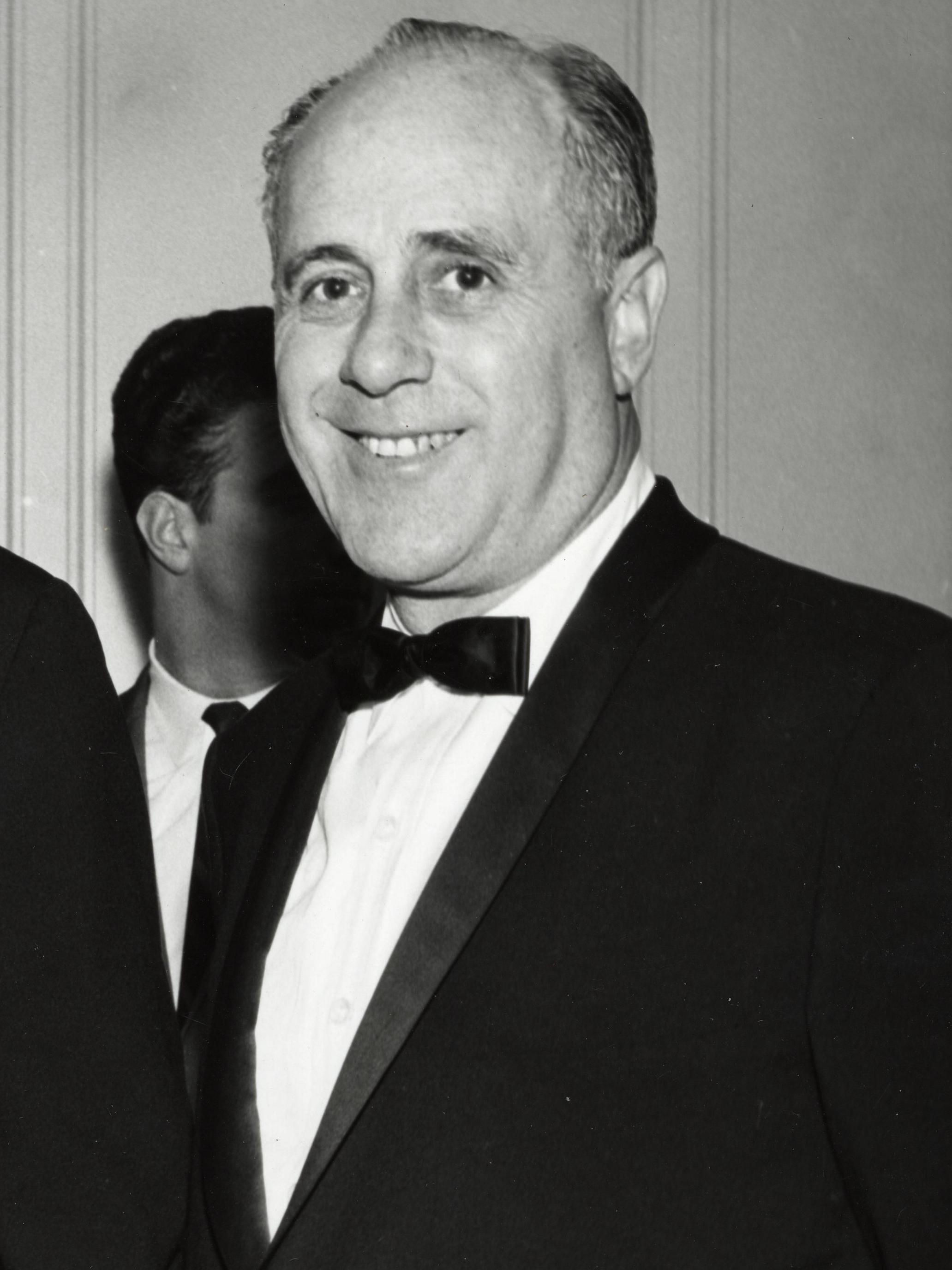
Hall of Famer Red Auerbach coached the Blackhawks for one season.

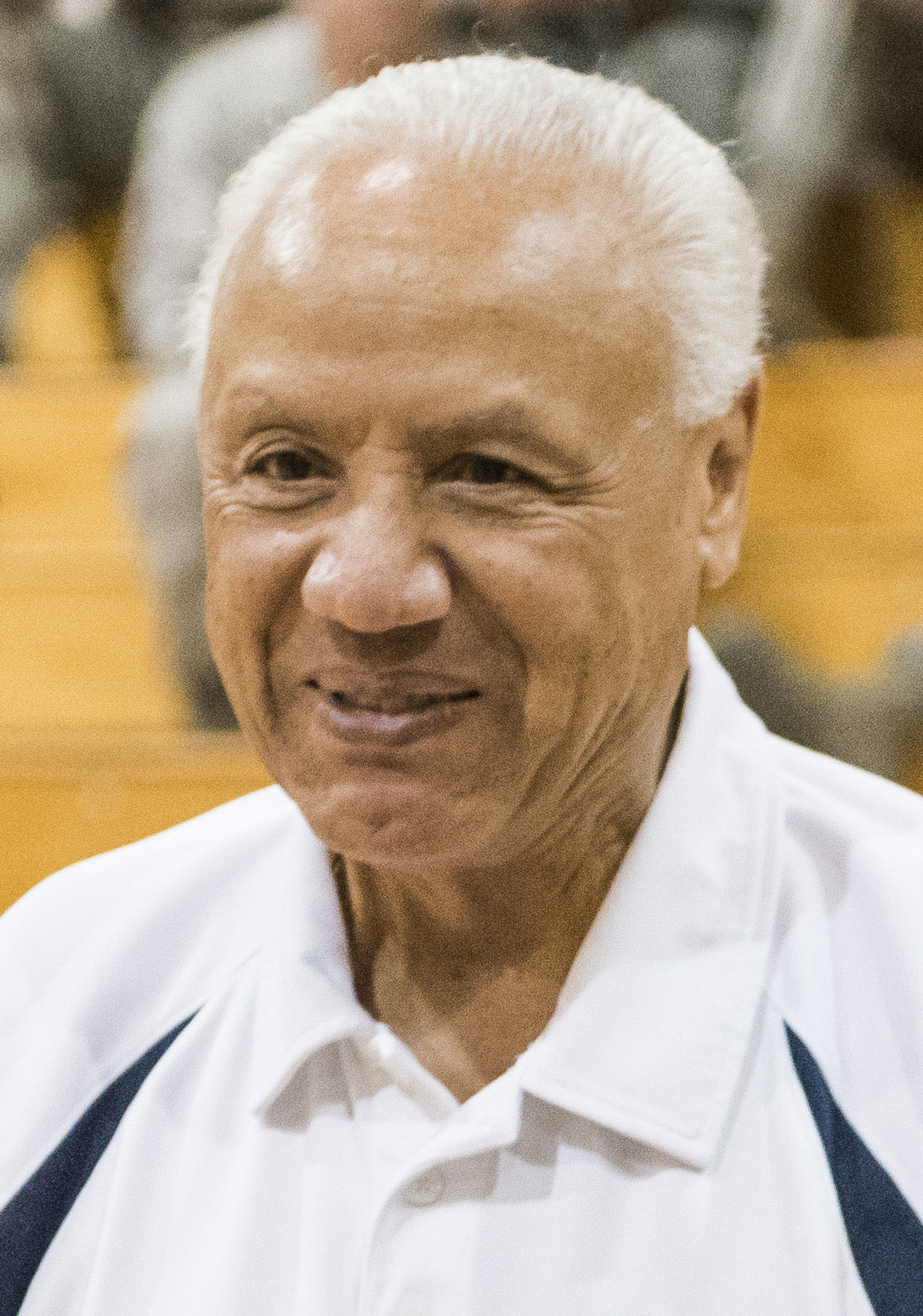
Lenny Wilkens was the head coach of the Atlanta Hawks from 1993 to 2000.

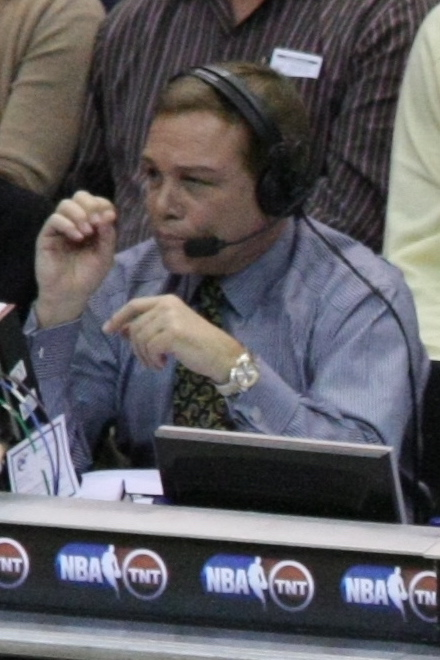
Mike Fratello was the coach for the Hawks in 1981 and from 1984–1990.

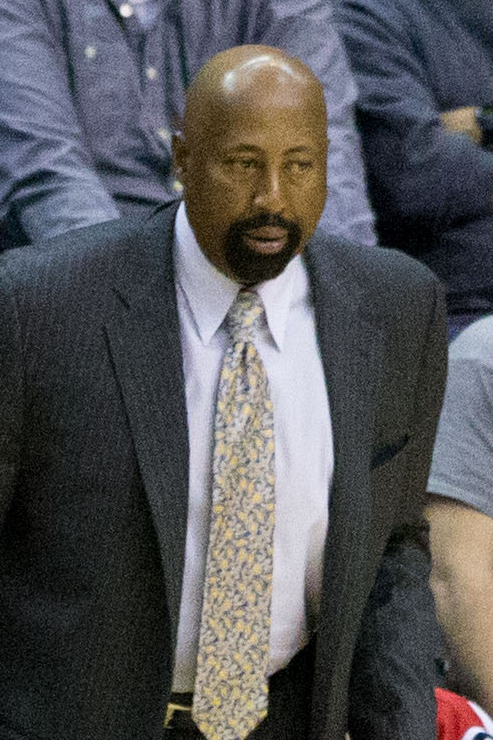
Mike Woodson was the head coach of the Atlanta Hawks for 6 seasons, from 2004–2010.

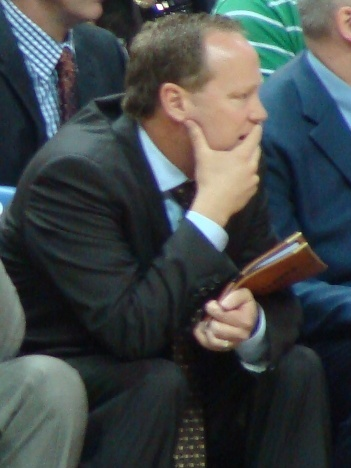
Mike Budenholzer coached the Hawks for 5 seasons, from 2013 to 2018

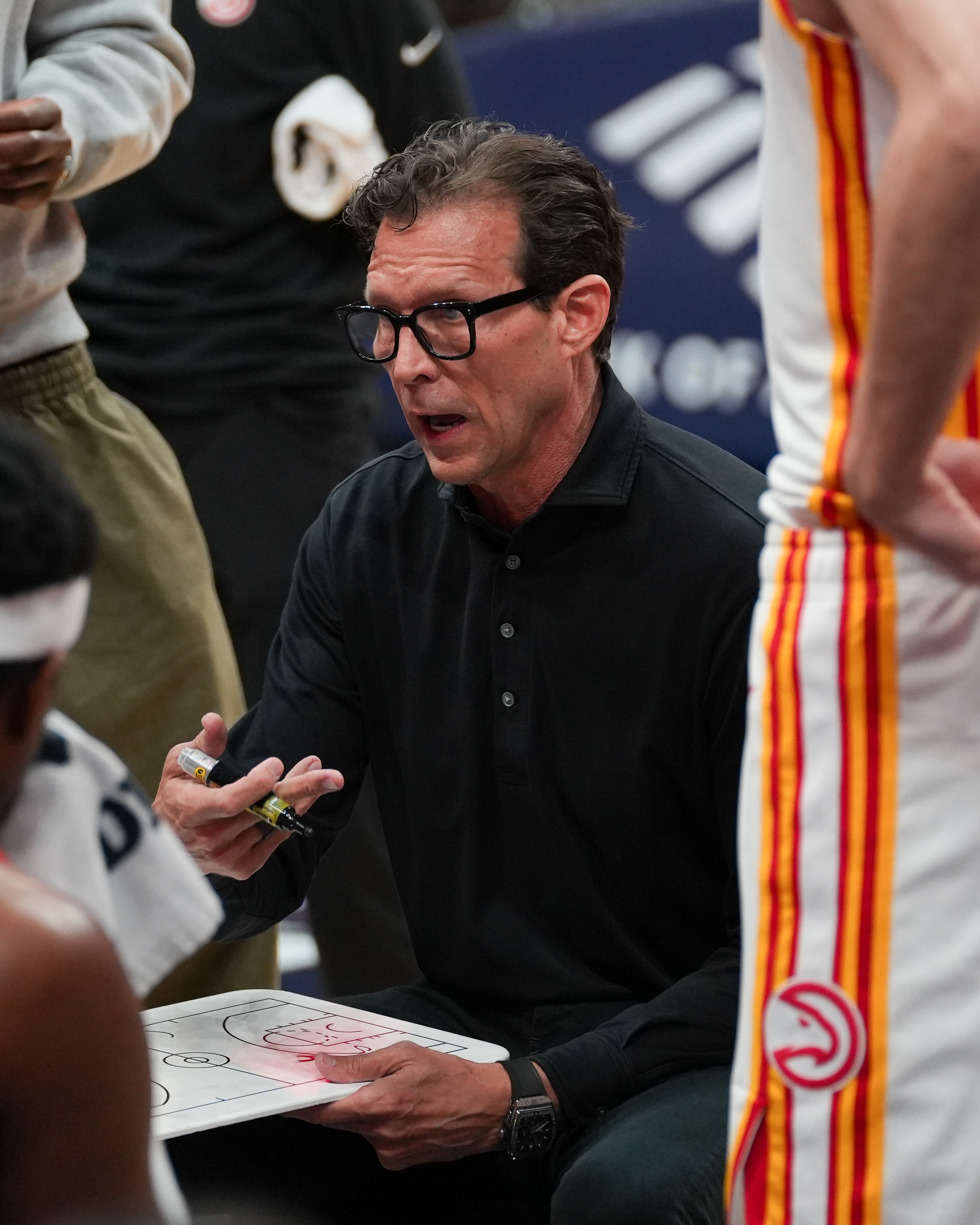
Quin Snyder is the current head coach of the Atlanta Hawks since 2023

== Notes ==
- ^{a} A running total of the number of coaches of the Hawks. Thus, any coach who has two or more separate terms as head coach is only counted once.
- ^{b} Each year is linked to an article about that particular NBA season.
