= List of current NBA head coaches =

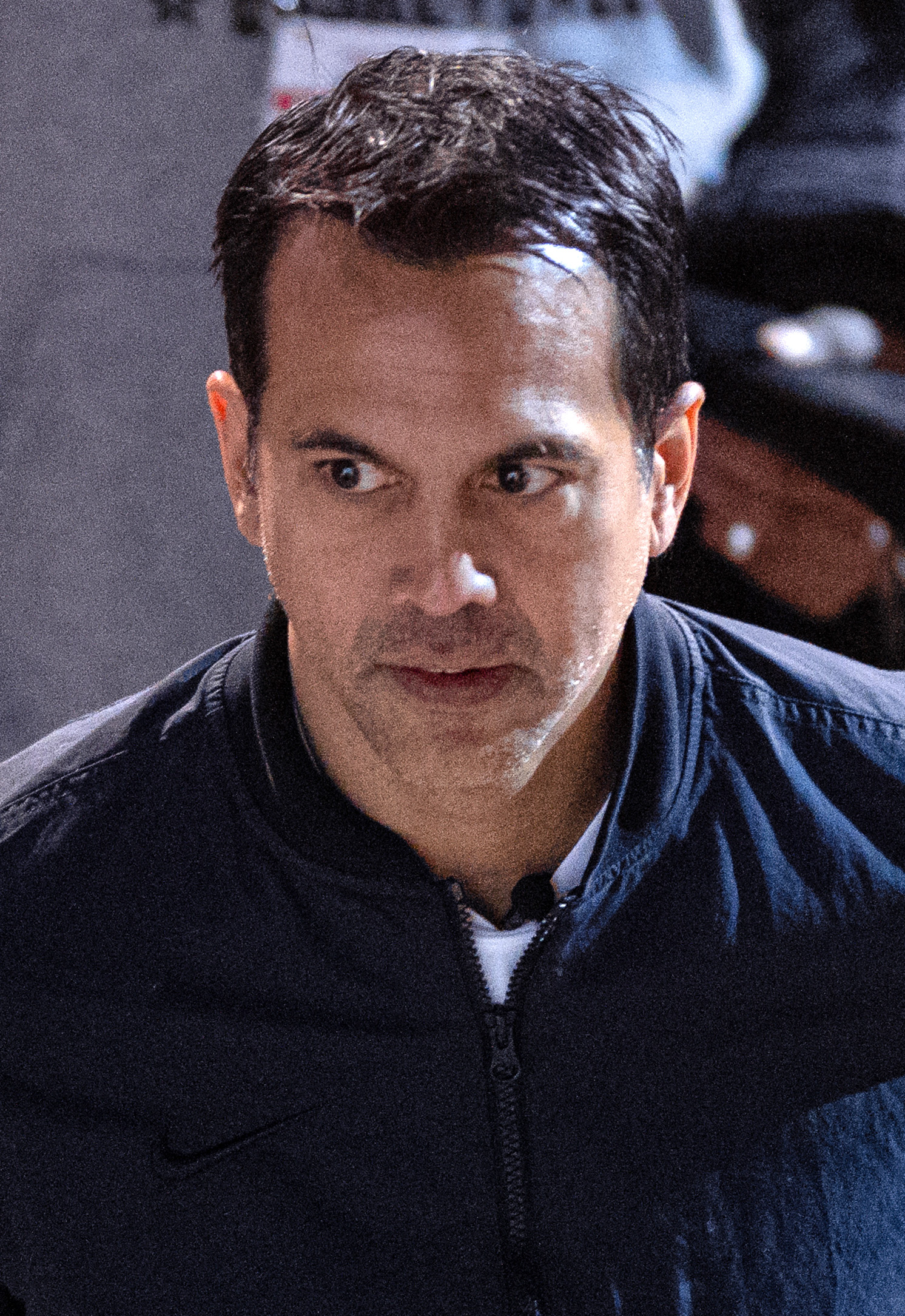
Erik Spoelstra has coached the Miami Heat since 2008, winning two NBA championships with the team.

This list includes the date of hiring and the performance record of National Basketball Association (NBA) head coaches. The league consists of 30 teams, of which 29 are located in the United States and one in Canada. In the NBA, a head coach is the highest ranking coach of a coaching staff.

Erik Spoelstra has served as head coach of the Miami Heat since the 2008–09 season and is currently the NBA's longest-tenured coach. Amongst the active NBA head coaches, Rick Carlisle has coached, won, and lost the most games.

Mike Brown, Mark Daigneault, Steve Kerr, Joe Mazzulla, and Spoelstra have won NBA championships with their current teams, while Carlisle, Tyronn Lue, and Nick Nurse have won with their former teams. As of May 2026, 17 coaches have spent their entire NBA head coaching career with their current team.

== Key ==
GC	Games coached
W	Wins
L	Losses
Win%	Winning percentage
*	Spent entire NBA head coaching career with the current franchise

== Coaches ==
Note: Statistics are accurate through the 2025–26 NBA season.

Team	Image	Head coach	Division	Conference	Start date (Note: Start date of current term at the team; each date is linked to an article about that particular NBA season.)	GC	W	L	Win%	GC	W	L	Win%	Ref.
Team	Image	Head coach	Division	Conference	Start date	Current (Note: Coaching records from the current term with the team; coaching records from previous term with the team are not included.)				Career (Note: Career coaching records in the NBA; records in the American Basketball Association (ABA) and other leagues are not included.)				Ref.
Atlanta Hawks		Quin Snyder	Southeast	Eastern	February 26, 2023	267	132	135	.494	903	504	399	.558	
Boston Celtics		Joe Mazzulla*	Atlantic	Eastern	February 16, 2023	328	238	90	.726	328	238	90	.726	
Brooklyn Nets		Jordi Fernández*	Atlantic	Eastern	April 22, 2024	164	46	118	.280	164	46	118	.280	
Charlotte Hornets		Charles Lee*	Southeast	Eastern	May 9, 2024	164	63	101	.384	164	63	101	.384	
Chicago Bulls		Tiago Splitter	Central	Eastern	June 16, 2026	0	0	0	–	81	42	39	.519	
Cleveland Cavaliers		Kenny Atkinson	Central	Eastern	June 28, 2024	164	116	48	.707	472	234	238	.496	
Dallas Mavericks		Dusty May*	Southwest	Western	June 23, 2026	0	0	0	–	0	0	0	–	
Denver Nuggets		David Adelman*	Northwest	Western	April 8, 2025	85	57	28	.671	85	57	28	.671	
Detroit Pistons		J. B. Bickerstaff	Central	Eastern	July 3, 2024	164	104	60	.634	709	359	350	.506	
Golden State Warriors		Steve Kerr*	Pacific	Western	May 19, 2014	957	604	353	.631	957	604	353	.631	
Houston Rockets		Ime Udoka	Southwest	Western	April 25, 2023	246	145	101	.589	328	196	132	.598	
Indiana Pacers		Rick Carlisle	Central	Eastern	June 24, 2021	410	176	234	.429	1,935	1,012	923	.523	
Los Angeles Clippers		Tyronn Lue	Pacific	Western	October 20, 2020	482	276	206	.573	693	404	289	.583	
Los Angeles Lakers		JJ Redick*	Pacific	Western	June 24, 2024	164	103	61	.628	164	103	61	.628	
Memphis Grizzlies		Tuomas Iisalo*	Southwest	Western	March 28, 2025	91	29	62	.319	91	29	62	.319	
Miami Heat		Erik Spoelstra*	Southeast	Eastern	April 28, 2008	1,441	830	611	.576	1,441	830	611	.576	
Milwaukee Bucks		Taylor Jenkins	Central	Eastern	April 30, 2026	0	0	0	–	464	250	214	.539	
Minnesota Timberwolves		Chris Finch*	Northwest	Western	February 22, 2021	451	258	193	.572	451	258	193	.572	
New Orleans Pelicans		Jamahl Mosley	Southwest	Western	May 18, 2026	0	0	0	–	410	189	221	.461	
New York Knicks		Mike Brown	Atlantic	Eastern	July 7, 2025	82	53	29	.646	840	507	333	.604	
Oklahoma City Thunder		Mark Daigneault*	Northwest	Western	November 11, 2020	482	275	207	.571	482	275	207	.571	
Orlando Magic		Sean Sweeney*	Southeast	Eastern	June 1, 2026	0	0	0	–	0	0	0	–	
Philadelphia 76ers		Nick Nurse	Atlantic	Eastern	June 1, 2023	246	116	130	.472	636	343	293	.539	
Phoenix Suns		Jordan Ott*	Pacific	Western	June 4, 2025	82	45	37	.549	82	45	37	.549	
Portland Trail Blazers		Micah Nori*	Northwest	Western	June 23, 2026	0	0	0	–	0	0	0	–	
Sacramento Kings		Doug Christie*	Pacific	Western	December 27, 2024	133	49	84	.368	133	49	84	.368	
San Antonio Spurs		Mitch Johnson*	Southwest	Western	May 2, 2025	159	94	65	.591	159	94	65	.591	
Toronto Raptors		Darko Rajaković*	Atlantic	Eastern	June 13, 2023	246	101	145	.411	246	101	145	.411	
Utah Jazz		Will Hardy*	Northwest	Western	June 29, 2022	328	107	221	.326	328	107	221	.326	
Washington Wizards		Brian Keefe*	Southeast	Eastern	May 29, 2024	203	43	160	.212	203	43	160	.212	

== See also ==
- NBA Coach of the Year Award
- List of NBA head coaches with 500 games coached
- List of NBA player-coaches
- List of NBA championship head coaches
- List of foreign NBA coaches
- Top 10 Coaches in NBA History
- List of female NBA coaches
- List of NBA general managers
- List of NBA team presidents
