= List of NBA head coaches with 500 games coached =

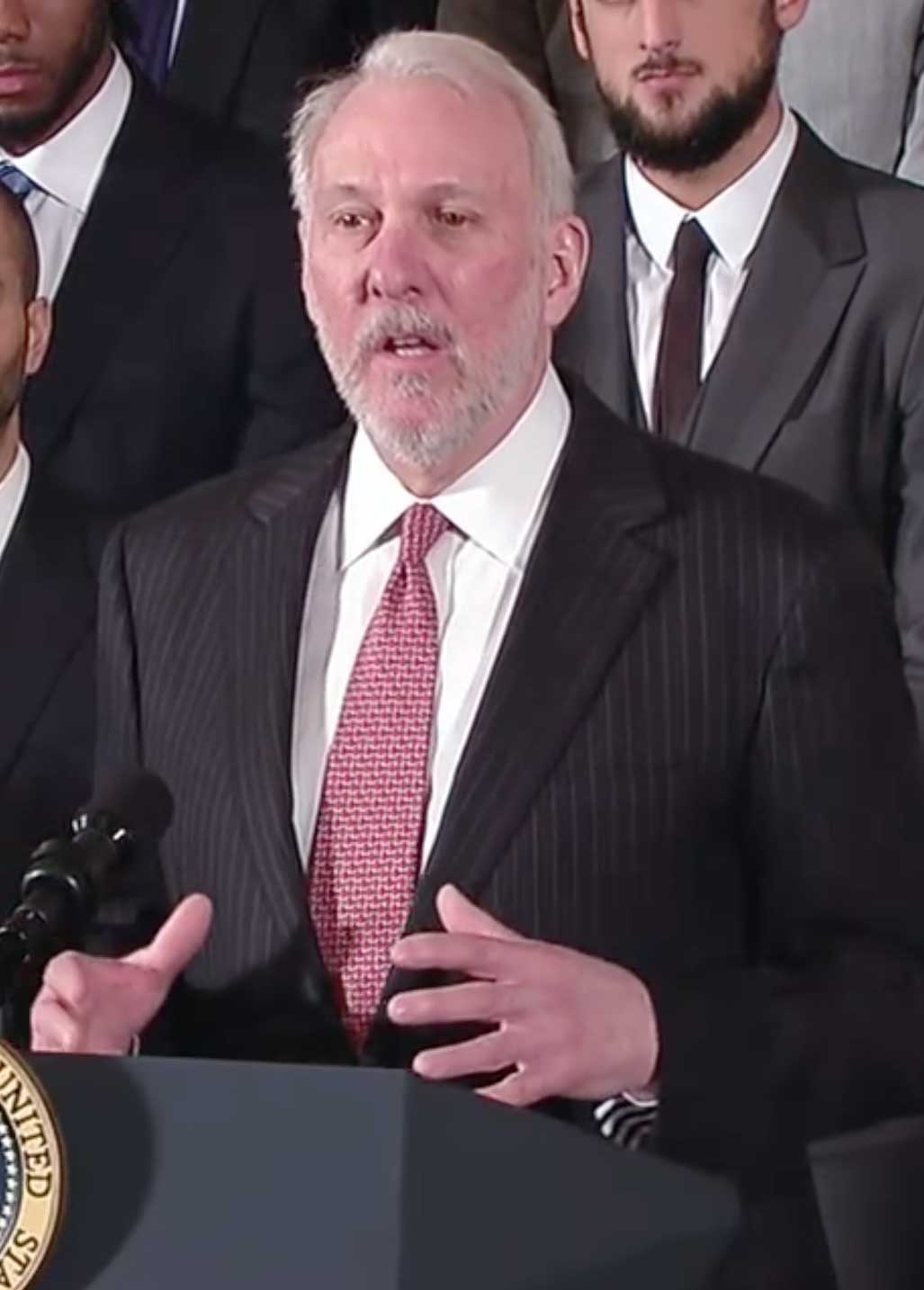
Gregg Popovich was inducted into the Basketball Hall of Fame in 2023. Popovich leads the NBA for the most regular season game wins.

The National Basketball Association (NBA) is a major professional basketball league in North America. It was founded in 1946 as the Basketball Association of America (BAA). The league adopted its current name at the start of the 1949–50 NBA season when it merged with the National Basketball League (NBL). The league consists of 30 teams, of which 29 are located in the United States and one in Canada.

In the NBA, a head coach is the highest ranking coach of a coaching staff. They typically hold a more public profile and are paid more than the assistant coaches. Lenny Wilkens has coached the most regular season games. He has coached 2,487 games with six teams in 32 seasons. Gregg Popovich has won the most regular season games with 1,390. Don Nelson, Bill Fitch, Jerry Sloan, Larry Brown and Doc Rivers are the only other coaches who have coached more than 2,000 regular season games. 33 other head coaches have coached more than 1,000 regular season games. Three of those coaches, Gregg Popovich, Al Attles and Erik Spoelstra, have spent their entire coaching career with one team. Gregg Popovich has coached 2,214 regular season games with the San Antonio Spurs in his 29 years career, Al Attles has coached 1,075 regular season games with the Golden State Warriors in his 14 years career, and Spoelstra has coached 1,359 regular season games with the Miami Heat in his 17 years career.

As of May 2, 2025, Gregg Popovich has the most regular season games coached (2,214) with one team, during his 29 years career with the San Antonio Spurs. He also has the record of most game wins when combining regular season and postseason games with 1,560 wins. Larry Brown has coached 9 different teams, the highest number of teams coached among the head coaches.

Former Chicago Bulls and Los Angeles Lakers head coach Phil Jackson won 11 NBA championships, the most in NBA history. He is the only coach who has won multiple championships with multiple teams. He won six titles with the Chicago Bulls and five titles with the Los Angeles Lakers. He also leads the NBA for the most postseason games coached and the most postseason wins. Red Auerbach won nine championships with the Boston Celtics. He won his first title in 1957 before winning eight consecutive titles from 1959 to 1966. John Kundla, Pat Riley and Gregg Popovich have each won five championships. Gregg Popovich won all of his titles coaching the San Antonio Spurs as John Kundla won all of his titles with the Los Angeles Lakers, while Pat Riley won four titles with the Los Angeles Lakers and one with the Miami Heat. Don Nelson, Gregg Popovich and Pat Riley each won the Coach of the Year Award three times, while Bill Fitch, Hubie Brown, Mike Brown, Mike Budenholzer, Mike D'Antoni, Cotton Fitzsimmons, Gene Shue and Tom Thibodeau have each won it twice. 23 NBA head coaches (Rick Adelman, Red Auerbach, Larry Brown, Chuck Daly, Billy Donovan, Bill Fitch, Cotton Fitzsimmons, Alex Hannum, Tom Heinsohn, Red Holzman, Phil Jackson, George Karl, John Kundla, Don Nelson, Gregg Popovich, Jack Ramsay, Pat Riley, Doc Rivers, Bill Russell, Bill Sharman, Jerry Sloan, Rudy Tomjanovich and Lenny Wilkens) have earned induction into the Naismith Memorial Basketball Hall of Fame as a coach. Red Auerbach, Chuck Daly, Bill Fitch, Red Holzman, Phil Jackson, John Kundla, Don Nelson, Jack Ramsay, Pat Riley and Lenny Wilkens were named in the list of Top 10 Coaches in NBA History announced at the league's 50th anniversary in 1996. Larry Brown, Gregg Popovich, Jerry Sloan, Erik Spoelstra, K. C. Jones, Steve Kerr and Doc Rivers joined Red Auerbach, Chuck Daly, Red Holzman, Phil Jackson, Don Nelson, Jack Ramsay, Pat Riley and Lenny Wilkens on the updated list of 15 Greatest Coaches in NBA History, announced during the league's 75th anniversary in 2021.

This list includes all head coaches who have coached at least 500 games in the NBA or BAA. The list does not include games in the American Basketball Association (ABA) for head coaches who coached in the ABA prior to the ABA–NBA merger.

== Key ==
| Yrs | Number of years coached |
| GC | Games coached |
| W | Wins |
| L | Losses |
| Win% | Winning percentage |
| ^ | Denotes coach who is currently coaching an NBA team |
| * | Elected to the Naismith Memorial Basketball Hall of Fame as a coach |
| * | Elected to the Naismith Memorial Basketball Hall of Fame as a contributor |
| *^ | Active NBA coach who has been elected to the Naismith Memorial Basketball Hall of Fame |

== List ==
Statistics accurate as of the 2025–26 NBA season.

| Coach | Team(s) coached (years)^{[a]} | Yrs | GC | W | L | Win% | GC | W | L | Win% | Championships won^{[b]} | Coach of the Year award(s) won^{[a]} | Ref. |
| Coach | Team(s) coached (years)^{[a]} | Yrs | Regular season | | | | Playoffs | | | | Championships won^{[b]} | Coach of the Year award(s) won^{[a]} | Ref. |
|---|---|---|---|---|---|---|---|---|---|---|---|---|---|
| Rick Adelman* | • Portland Trail Blazers (1989–1994) • Golden State Warriors (1996–1997) • Sacramento Kings (1998–2006) • Houston Rockets (2007–2011) • Minnesota Timberwolves (2011–2014) | 23 | 1,791 | 1,042 | 749 | .582 | 157 | 79 | 78 | .503 | None | None | |
| Stan Albeck | • Cleveland Cavaliers (1979–1980) • San Antonio Spurs (1980–1983) • New Jersey Nets (1983–1985) • Chicago Bulls (1985–1986) | 7 | 574 | 307 | 267 | .535 | 44 | 18 | 26 | .409 | None | None | |
| Al Attles* | • San Francisco / Golden State Warriors (1970–1982) | 14 | 1,075 | 557 | 518 | .518 | 61 | 31 | 30 | .508 | 1 (1975) | None | |
| Red Auerbach* | • Washington Capitols (1946–1949) • Tri-Cities Blackhawks (1949–1950) • Boston Celtics (1950–1966) | 20 | 1,417 | 938 | 479 | .662 | 168 | 99 | 69 | .589 | 9 (1957, 1959, 1960, 1961, 1962, 1963, 1964, 1965, 1966) | 1 (1965) | |
| Bernie Bickerstaff | • Seattle SuperSonics (1985–1990) • Denver Nuggets (1995–1996) • Washington Bullets / Wizards (1997–1999) • Charlotte Bobcats (2004–2007) • Los Angeles Lakers (2012) | 14 | 937 | 419 | 518 | .447 | 33 | 12 | 21 | .364 | None | None | |
| J. B. Bickerstaff^ | • Houston Rockets (2015–2016) • Memphis Grizzlies (2017–2019) • Cleveland Cavaliers (2020–2024) • Detroit Pistons (2024–present) | 10 | 709 | 359 | 350 | .506 | 42 | 16 | 26 | .381 | None | None | |
| Scott Brooks | • Oklahoma City Thunder (2008–2015) • Washington Wizards (2016–2021) | 12 | 935 | 521 | 414 | .557 | 97 | 49 | 48 | .505 | None | 1 (2010) | |
| Brett Brown | • Philadelphia 76ers (2013–2020) | 7 | 565 | 221 | 344 | .391 | 26 | 12 | 14 | .462 | None | None | |
| Hubie Brown* | • Atlanta Hawks (1976–1981) • New York Knicks (1982–1987) • Memphis Grizzlies (2002–2004) | 13 | 919 | 424 | 495 | .461 | 38 | 14 | 24 | .368 | None | 2 (1978, 2004) | |
| Larry Brown* | • Denver Nuggets (1976–1979) • New Jersey Nets (1981–1983) • San Antonio Spurs (1988–1992) • Los Angeles Clippers (1992–1993) • Indiana Pacers (1993–1997) • Philadelphia 76ers (1997–2003) • Detroit Pistons (2003–2005) • New York Knicks (2005–2006) • Charlotte Bobcats (2008–2010) | 26 | 2,002 | 1,098 | 904 | .548 | 193 | 100 | 93 | .518 | 1 (2004) | 1 (2001) | |
| Mike Brown^ | • Cleveland Cavaliers (2005–2010, 2013–2014) • Los Angeles Lakers (2011–2012) • Sacramento Kings (2022–2024) • New York Knicks (2025–present) | 12 | 840 | 507 | 333 | .604 | 109 | 66 | 43 | .606 | 1 (2026) | 2 (2009, 2023) | |
| Mike Budenholzer | • Atlanta Hawks (2013–2018) • Milwaukee Bucks (2018–2023) • Phoenix Suns (2024–2025) | 11 | 883 | 520 | 363 | .589 | 104 | 56 | 48 | .538 | 1 (2021) | 2 (2015, 2019) | |
| P. J. Carlesimo | • Portland Trail Blazers (1994–1997) • Golden State Warriors (1997–1999) • Seattle SuperSonics / Oklahoma City Thunder (2007–2008) • Brooklyn Nets (2012–2013) | 9 | 554 | 239 | 315 | .431 | 19 | 6 | 13 | .316 | None | None | |
| Rick Carlisle^ | • Detroit Pistons (2001–2003) • Indiana Pacers (2003–2007, 2021–present) • Dallas Mavericks (2008–2021) | 24 | 1,935 | 1,012 | 923 | .523 | 173 | 86 | 87 | .497 | 1 (2011) | 1 (2002) | |
| Dwane Casey | • Minnesota Timberwolves (2005–2007) • Toronto Raptors (2011–2018) • Detroit Pistons (2018–2023) | 14 | 1,064 | 494 | 570 | .464 | 55 | 21 | 34 | .382 | None | 1 (2018) | |
| Al Cervi | • Syracuse Nationals (1949–1956) • Philadelphia Warriors (1958–1959) | 9 | 567 | 326 | 241 | .575 | 59 | 33 | 26 | .559 | 1 (1955) | None | |
| Don Chaney | • Los Angeles Clippers (1985–1987) • Houston Rockets (1988–1992) • Detroit Pistons (1993–1995) • New York Knicks (2001–2004) | 12 | 831 | 337 | 494 | .406 | 11 | 2 | 9 | .182 | None | 1 (1991) | |
| Maurice Cheeks | • Portland Trail Blazers (2001–2004) • Philadelphia 76ers (2005–2008) • Detroit Pistons (2013–2014) | 9 | 620 | 305 | 315 | .492 | 16 | 5 | 11 | .313 | None | None | |
| Steve Clifford | • Charlotte Bobcats / Hornets (2013–2018, 2022–2024) • Orlando Magic (2018–2021) | 10 | 801 | 340 | 461 | .424 | 21 | 5 | 16 | .238 | None | None | |
| Doug Collins* | • Chicago Bulls (1986–1989) • Detroit Pistons (1995–1998) • Washington Wizards (2001–2003) • Philadelphia 76ers (2010–2013) | 11 | 849 | 442 | 407 | .521 | 56 | 23 | 33 | .411 | None | None | |
| Larry Costello* | • Milwaukee Bucks (1968–1976) • Chicago Bulls (1978–1979) | 10 | 730 | 430 | 300 | .589 | 60 | 37 | 23 | .617 | 1 (1971) | None | |
| Billy Cunningham | • Philadelphia 76ers (1977–1985) | 8 | 650 | 454 | 196 | .698 | 105 | 66 | 39 | .629 | 1 (1983) | None | |
| Mike D'Antoni* | • Denver Nuggets (1998–1999) • Phoenix Suns (2003–2008) • New York Knicks (2008–2012) • Los Angeles Lakers (2012–2014) • Houston Rockets (2016–2020) | 16 | 1,199 | 672 | 527 | .560 | 110 | 54 | 56 | .491 | None | 2 (2005, 2017) | |
| Chuck Daly* | • Cleveland Cavaliers (1981–1982) • Detroit Pistons (1983–1992) • New Jersey Nets (1992–1994) • Orlando Magic (1997–1999) | 14 | 1,075 | 638 | 437 | .593 | 126 | 75 | 51 | .595 | 2 (1989, 1990) | None | |
| Billy Donovan* | • Oklahoma City Thunder (2015–2020) • Chicago Bulls (2020–2026) | 11 | 882 | 469 | 413 | .532 | 46 | 19 | 27 | .413 | None | None | |
| Mike Dunleavy | • Los Angeles Lakers (1990–1992) • Milwaukee Bucks (1992–1996) • Portland Trail Blazers (1997–2001) • Los Angeles Clippers (2003–2010) | 17 | 1,329 | 613 | 716 | .461 | 71 | 38 | 33 | .535 | None | 1 (1999) | |
| Bill Fitch* | • Cleveland Cavaliers (1970–1979) • Boston Celtics (1979–1983) • Houston Rockets (1983–1988) • New Jersey Nets (1989–1992) • Los Angeles Clippers (1994–1998) | 25 | 2,050 | 944 | 1,106 | .460 | 109 | 55 | 54 | .505 | 1 (1981) | 2 (1976, 1980) | |
| Cotton Fitzsimmons* | • Phoenix Suns (1970–1972, 1988–1992, 1996) • Atlanta Hawks (1972–1976) • Buffalo Braves (1977–1978) • Kansas City Kings (1978–1984) • San Antonio Spurs (1984–1986) | 21 | 1,607 | 832 | 775 | .518 | 84 | 35 | 49 | .417 | None | 2 (1979, 1989) | |
| Chris Ford | • Boston Celtics (1990–1995) • Milwaukee Bucks (1996–1998) • Los Angeles Clippers (1998–2000) • Philadelphia 76ers (2004) | 10 | 699 | 323 | 376 | .462 | 29 | 13 | 16 | .448 | None | None | |
| Lawrence Frank | • New Jersey Nets (2004–2009) • Detroit Pistons (2011–2013) | 9 | 614 | 279 | 335 | .454 | 38 | 18 | 20 | .474 | None | None | |
| Mike Fratello | • Atlanta Hawks (1981, 1983–1990) • Cleveland Cavaliers (1993–1999) • Memphis Grizzlies (2004–2006) | 17 | 1,215 | 667 | 548 | .549 | 62 | 20 | 42 | .323 | None | 1 (1986) | |
| Alvin Gentry | • Miami Heat (1995) • Detroit Pistons (1998–2000) • Los Angeles Clippers (2000–2003) • Phoenix Suns (2009–2013) • New Orleans Pelicans (2015–2020) • Sacramento Kings (2021–2022) | 18 | 1,170 | 534 | 636 | .456 | 30 | 17 | 13 | .567 | None | None | |
| Edward Gottlieb* | • Philadelphia Warriors (1946–1955) | 9 | 581 | 263 | 318 | .453 | 32 | 15 | 17 | .469 | 1 (1947) | None | |
| Richie Guerin | • St. Louis / Atlanta Hawks (1964–1972) | 8 | 618 | 327 | 291 | .529 | 60 | 26 | 34 | .433 | None | 1 (1968) | |
| Matt Guokas | • Philadelphia 76ers (1985–1988) • Orlando Magic (1989–1993) | 7 | 535 | 230 | 305 | .430 | 17 | 8 | 9 | .471 | None | None | |
| Alex Hannum* | • St. Louis Hawks (1957–1958) • Syracuse Nationals / Philadelphia 76ers (1960–1963, 1966–1968) • San Francisco Warriors (1963–1966) • San Diego Rockets (1969–1971) | 12 | 883 | 471 | 412 | .533 | 79 | 45 | 34 | .570 | 2 (1958, 1967) | 1 (1964) | |
| Del Harris* | • Houston Rockets (1979–1983) • Milwaukee Bucks (1987–1991) • Los Angeles Lakers (1994–1999) | 14 | 1,013 | 556 | 457 | .549 | 88 | 38 | 50 | .432 | None | 1 (1995) | |
| Tom Heinsohn* | • Boston Celtics (1969–1978) | 9 | 690 | 427 | 263 | .619 | 80 | 47 | 33 | .588 | 2 (1974, 1976) | 1 (1973) | |
| Bob Hill | • New York Knicks (1986–1987) • Indiana Pacers (1990–1993) • San Antonio Spurs (1994–1996) • Seattle SuperSonics (2006–2007) | 9 | 603 | 310 | 293 | .514 | 37 | 17 | 20 | .459 | None | None | |
| Brian Hill | • Orlando Magic (1993–1997, 2005–2007) • Vancouver Grizzlies (1997–1999) | 9 | 613 | 298 | 315 | .486 | 40 | 18 | 22 | .450 | None | None | |
| Lionel Hollins | • Vancouver / Memphis Grizzlies (1999–2000, 2004, 2009–2013) • Brooklyn Nets (2014–2016) | 9 | 534 | 262 | 272 | .491 | 41 | 20 | 21 | .488 | None | None | |
| Red Holzman* | • Milwaukee / St. Louis Hawks (1954–1957) • New York Knicks (1967–1977, 1978–1982) | 18 | 1,300 | 696 | 604 | .535 | 105 | 58 | 47 | .552 | 2 (1970, 1973) | 1 (1970) | |
| Phil Jackson* | • Chicago Bulls (1989–1998) • Los Angeles Lakers (1999–2004, 2005–2011) | 20 | 1,640 | 1,155 | 485 | .704 | 333 | 229 | 104 | .688 | 11 (1991, 1992, 1993, 1996, 1997, 1998, 2000, 2001, 2002, 2009, 2010) | 1 (1996) | |
| Phil Johnson | • Kansas City-Omaha / Kansas City / Sacramento Kings (1973–1978, 1984–1987) • Chicago Bulls (1982) | 9 | 543 | 236 | 307 | .435 | 9 | 2 | 7 | .222 | None | 1 (1975) | |
| K. C. Jones | • Capital / Washington Bullets (1973–1976) • Boston Celtics (1983–1988) • Seattle SuperSonics (1990–1992) | 10 | 774 | 522 | 252 | .674 | 138 | 81 | 57 | .587 | 2 (1984, 1986) | None | |
| Eddie Jordan | • Sacramento Kings (1997–1998) • Washington Wizards (2003–2008) • Philadelphia 76ers (2009–2010) | 9 | 600 | 257 | 343 | .428 | 26 | 8 | 18 | .308 | None | None | |
| George Karl* | • Cleveland Cavaliers (1984–1986) • Golden State Warriors (1986–1988) • Seattle SuperSonics (1992–1998) • Milwaukee Bucks (1998–2003) • Denver Nuggets (2005–2013) • Sacramento Kings (2015–2016) | 27 | 1,999 | 1,175 | 824 | .588 | 185 | 80 | 105 | .432 | None | 1 (2013) | |
| Steve Kerr^ | • Golden State Warriors (2014–present) | 12 | 957 | 604 | 353 | .631 | 152 | 104 | 48 | .684 | 4 (2015, 2017, 2018, 2022) | 1 (2016) | |
| Jason Kidd | • Brooklyn Nets (2013–2014) • Milwaukee Bucks (2014–2018) • Dallas Mavericks (2021–2026) | 10 | 783 | 388 | 395 | .496 | 64 | 31 | 33 | .484 | None | None | |
| John Kundla* | • Minneapolis Lakers (1948–1958, 1958–1959) | 11 | 725 | 423 | 302 | .583 | 95 | 60 | 35 | .632 | 5 (1949, 1950, 1952, 1953, 1954) | None | |
| Joe Lapchick | • New York Knicks (1947–1956) | 9 | 573 | 326 | 247 | .569 | 60 | 30 | 30 | .500 | None | None | |
| Frank Layden | • Utah Jazz (1981–1988) | 8 | 571 | 277 | 294 | .485 | 41 | 18 | 23 | .439 | None | 1 (1984) | |
| Kevin Loughery | • Philadelphia 76ers (1973) • New York / New Jersey Nets (1976–1980) • Atlanta Hawks (1981–1983) • Chicago Bulls (1983–1985) • Washington Bullets (1986–1988) • Miami Heat (1991–1995) | 17 | 1,136 | 474 | 662 | .417 | 27 | 6 | 21 | .222 | None | None | |
| Tyronn Lue^ | • Cleveland Cavaliers (2016–2018) • Los Angeles Clippers (2020–present) | 10 | 693 | 404 | 289 | .583 | 98 | 57 | 41 | .582 | 1 (2016) | None | |
| Jim Lynam | • San Diego / Los Angeles Clippers (1983–1985) • Philadelphia 76ers (1988–1992) • Washington Bullets (1994–1997) | 10 | 720 | 328 | 392 | .456 | 21 | 8 | 13 | .381 | None | None | |
| John MacLeod | • Phoenix Suns (1973–1987) • Dallas Mavericks (1987–1989) • New York Knicks (1990–1991) | 18 | 1,364 | 707 | 657 | .518 | 101 | 47 | 54 | .465 | None | None | |
| Michael Malone | • Sacramento Kings (2013–2014) • Denver Nuggets (2015–2025) | 12 | 904 | 510 | 394 | .564 | 80 | 44 | 36 | .550 | 1 (2023) | None | |
| Jack McMahon | • Chicago Zephyrs (1962) • Cincinnati Royals (1963–1967) • San Diego Rockets (1967–1969) | 8 | 549 | 260 | 289 | .474 | 29 | 10 | 19 | .345 | None | None | |
| Nate McMillan | • Seattle SuperSonics (2000–2005) • Portland Trail Blazers (2005–2012) • Indiana Pacers (2016–2020) • Atlanta Hawks (2021–2023) | 19 | 1,428 | 760 | 668 | .532 | 76 | 28 | 48 | .368 | None | None | |
| Doug Moe | • San Antonio Spurs (1976–1980) • Denver Nuggets (1980–1990) • Philadelphia 76ers (1992–1993) | 15 | 1,157 | 628 | 529 | .543 | 83 | 33 | 50 | .398 | None | 1 (1988) | |
| Dick Motta | • Chicago Bulls (1968–1976) • Washington Bullets (1976–1980) • Dallas Mavericks (1980–1987, 1994–1996) • Sacramento Kings (1990–1991) • Denver Nuggets (1996–1997) | 25 | 1,952 | 935 | 1,017 | .479 | 126 | 56 | 70 | .444 | 1 (1978) | 1 (1971) | |
| Don Nelson* | • Milwaukee Bucks (1976–1987) • Golden State Warriors (1988–1995, 2006–2010) • New York Knicks (1995–1996) • Dallas Mavericks (1997–2005) | 31 | 2,398 | 1,335 | 1,063 | .557 | 166 | 75 | 91 | .452 | None | 3 (1983, 1985, 1992) | |
| Tom Nissalke | • Seattle SuperSonics (1972–1973) • Houston Rockets (1976–1979) • Utah Jazz (1979–1981) • Cleveland Cavaliers (1982–1984) | 9 | 639 | 248 | 391 | .388 | 14 | 6 | 8 | .429 | None | 1 (1977) | |
| Nick Nurse^ | • Toronto Raptors (2018–2023) • Philadelphia 76ers (2023–present) | 8 | 636 | 343 | 293 | .539 | 58 | 31 | 27 | .534 | 1 (2019) | 1 (2020) | |
| Jim O'Brien | • Boston Celtics (2001–2004) • Philadelphia 76ers (2004–2005) • Indiana Pacers (2007–2011) | 9 | 630 | 303 | 327 | .481 | 31 | 14 | 17 | .452 | None | None | |
| Gregg Popovich* | • San Antonio Spurs (1996–2025) | 29 | 2,214 | 1,390 | 824 | .628 | 284 | 170 | 114 | .599 | 5 (1999, 2003, 2005, 2007, 2014) | 3 (2003, 2012, 2014) | |
| Jack Ramsay* | • Philadelphia 76ers (1969–1972) • Buffalo Braves (1973–1976) • Portland Trail Blazers (1977–1986) • Indiana Pacers (1986–1988) | 21 | 1,647 | 864 | 783 | .525 | 102 | 44 | 58 | .431 | 1 (1977) | None | |
| Pat Riley* | • Los Angeles Lakers (1981–1990) • New York Knicks (1991–1995) • Miami Heat (1995–2003, 2005–2008) | 24 | 1,904 | 1,210 | 694 | .636 | 282 | 171 | 111 | .606 | 5 (1982, 1985, 1987, 1988, 2006) | 3 (1990, 1993, 1997) | |
| Doc Rivers* | • Orlando Magic (1999–2003) • Boston Celtics (2004–2013) • Los Angeles Clippers (2013–2020) • Philadelphia 76ers (2020–2023) • Milwaukee Bucks (2024–2026) | 27 | 2,059 | 1,194 | 866 | .580 | 226 | 114 | 112 | .504 | 1 (2008) | 1 (2000) | |
| Bill Russell* | • Boston Celtics (1966–1969) • Seattle SuperSonics (1973–1977) • Sacramento Kings (1987–1988) | 8 | 631 | 341 | 290 | .540 | 61 | 34 | 27 | .557 | 2 (1968, 1969) | None | |
| Flip Saunders | • Minnesota Timberwolves (1995–2005, 2014–2015) • Detroit Pistons (2005–2008) • Washington Wizards (2009–2012) | 17 | 1,246 | 654 | 592 | .525 | 98 | 47 | 51 | .480 | None | None | |
| Fred Schaus | • Los Angeles Lakers (1960–1967) | 7 | 560 | 315 | 245 | .563 | 71 | 33 | 38 | .465 | None | None | |
| Byron Scott | • New Jersey Nets (2000–2004) • New Orleans Hornets (2004–2009) • Cleveland Cavaliers (2010–2013) • Los Angeles Lakers (2014–2016) | 15 | 1,101 | 454 | 647 | .412 | 57 | 33 | 24 | .579 | None | 1 (2008) | |
| Paul Seymour | • Syracuse Nationals (1956–1960) • St. Louis Hawks (1960–1961) • Baltimore Bullets (1965–1966) • Detroit Pistons (1968–1969) | 8 | 512 | 271 | 241 | .529 | 35 | 14 | 21 | .400 | None | None | |
| Bill Sharman* | • San Francisco Warriors (1966–1968) • Los Angeles Lakers (1971–1976) | 7 | 573 | 333 | 240 | .581 | 62 | 35 | 27 | .565 | 1 (1972) | 1 (1972) | |
| Gene Shue | • Baltimore / Washington Bullets (1966–1973, 1980–1986) • Philadelphia 76ers (1973–1977) • San Diego / Los Angeles Clippers (1978–1979, 1987–1989) | 22 | 1,645 | 784 | 861 | .477 | 77 | 30 | 47 | .390 | None | 2 (1969, 1982) | |
| Paul Silas | • San Diego Clippers (1980–1983) • Charlotte Hornets / Bobcats (1999–2002, 2010–2012) • New Orleans Hornets (2002–2003) • Cleveland Cavaliers (2003–2005) | 12 | 875 | 387 | 488 | .442 | 29 | 13 | 16 | .448 | None | None | |
| Scott Skiles | • Phoenix Suns (1999–2002) • Chicago Bulls (2003–2007) • Milwaukee Bucks (2008–2013) • Orlando Magic (2015–2016) | 14 | 958 | 478 | 480 | .499 | 42 | 18 | 24 | .429 | None | None | |
| Jerry Sloan* | • Chicago Bulls (1979–1982) • Utah Jazz (1988–2011) | 26 | 2,024 | 1,221 | 803 | .603 | 202 | 98 | 104 | .485 | None | None | |
| Quin Snyder^ | • Utah Jazz (2014–2022) • Atlanta Hawks (2023–present) | 12 | 903 | 504 | 399 | .558 | 63 | 25 | 38 | .397 | None | None | |
| Erik Spoelstra^ | • Miami Heat (2008–present) | 18 | 1,441 | 830 | 611 | .576 | 193 | 110 | 83 | .570 | 2 (2012, 2013) | None | |
| Brad Stevens | • Boston Celtics (2013–2021) | 8 | 636 | 354 | 282 | .557 | 78 | 38 | 40 | .487 | None | None | |
| Terry Stotts | • Atlanta Hawks (2002–2004) • Milwaukee Bucks (2005–2007) • Portland Trail Blazers (2012–2021) | 13 | 1,003 | 517 | 486 | .515 | 67 | 23 | 44 | .343 | None | None | |
| Tom Thibodeau | • Chicago Bulls (2010–2015) • Minnesota Timberwolves (2016–2019) • New York Knicks (2020–2025) | 13 | 998 | 578 | 420 | .579 | 103 | 48 | 55 | .466 | None | 2 (2011, 2021) | |
| Rudy Tomjanovich* | • Houston Rockets (1992–2003) • Los Angeles Lakers (2004–2005) | 13 | 943 | 527 | 416 | .559 | 90 | 51 | 39 | .567 | 2 (1994, 1995) | None | |
| Wes Unseld | • Washington Bullets (1988–1994) | 7 | 547 | 202 | 345 | .369 | 5 | 2 | 3 | .400 | None | None | |
| Butch van Breda Kolff | • Los Angeles Lakers (1967–1969) • Detroit Pistons (1969–1971) • Phoenix Suns (1972) • New Orleans Jazz (1974–1976) | 9 | 519 | 266 | 253 | .513 | 33 | 21 | 12 | .636 | None | None | |
| Jeff Van Gundy | • New York Knicks (1996–2001) • Houston Rockets (2003–2007) | 11 | 748 | 430 | 318 | .575 | 88 | 44 | 44 | .500 | None | None | |
| Stan Van Gundy | • Miami Heat (2003–2005) • Orlando Magic (2007–2012) • Detroit Pistons (2014–2018) • New Orleans Pelicans (2020–2021) | 13 | 979 | 554 | 425 | .566 | 91 | 48 | 43 | .527 | None | None | |
| Frank Vogel | • Indiana Pacers (2011–2016) • Orlando Magic (2016–2018) • Los Angeles Lakers (2019–2022) • Phoenix Suns (2023–2024) | 12 | 902 | 480 | 422 | .532 | 92 | 49 | 43 | .533 | 1 (2020) | None | |
| Bob Weiss | • San Antonio Spurs (1986–1988) • Atlanta Hawks (1990–1993) • Los Angeles Clippers (1993–1994) • Seattle SuperSonics (2005–2006) | 7 | 522 | 223 | 299 | .427 | 11 | 2 | 9 | .182 | None | None | |
| Paul Westphal | • Phoenix Suns (1992–1996) • Seattle SuperSonics (1998–2000) • Sacramento Kings (2009–2011) | 10 | 597 | 318 | 279 | .533 | 49 | 27 | 22 | .551 | None | None | |
| Lenny Wilkens* | • Seattle SuperSonics (1969–1972, 1977–1985) • Portland Trail Blazers (1974–1976) • Cleveland Cavaliers (1986–1993) • Atlanta Hawks (1993–2000) • Toronto Raptors (2000–2003) • New York Knicks (2004–2005) | 32 | 2,487 | 1,332 | 1,155 | .536 | 178 | 80 | 98 | .449 | 1 (1979) | 1 (1994) | |
| Monty Williams | • New Orleans Hornets / Pelicans (2010–2015) • Phoenix Suns (2019–2023) • Detroit Pistons (2023–2024) | 10 | 785 | 381 | 404 | .485 | 56 | 29 | 27 | .518 | None | 1 (2022) | |
| Randy Wittman | • Cleveland Cavaliers (1999–2001) • Minnesota Timberwolves (2007–2008) • Washington Wizards (2012–2016) | 10 | 684 | 278 | 406 | .406 | 21 | 12 | 9 | .571 | None | None | |
| Mike Woodson | • Atlanta Hawks (2004–2010) • New York Knicks (2012–2014) | 9 | 680 | 315 | 365 | .463 | 46 | 18 | 28 | .391 | None | None | |

== Playoff series ==
Below is a list of the most playoff series by a coach (minimum 20 or more playoff series). Phil Jackson, who appeared in 20 playoffs, coached the most series with 65 and won the most with 56; he also owns the highest win percentage at 86.2%. Gregg Popovich and George Karl made the most playoff appearances at 22. Karl has the most losses, having lost a series in each of his 22 appearances without winning a championship. Jerry Sloan coached and won the most playoff series without winning a championship, with 20 wins in 40 series. Jack Ramsay owns the lowest win percentage at 31.8%. Note that the playoff format has expanded over time. Results from the NBA play-in tournament are not counted.

Note: Statistics accurate thru the 2025–26 NBA season.

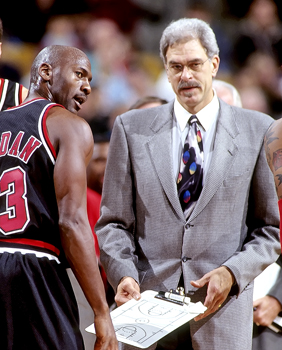
Phil Jackson has won more playoff series and coached more playoff series than any other coach. He also owns the highest series win percentage.

| Yrs | Number of years coached |
| SC | Series Coached |
| SW | Series Wins |
| SL | Series Losses |
| Win% | Winning percentage |
| App. | Playoff Appearances |
| ^ | Denotes coach who is currently coaching an NBA team |
| * | Elected to the Naismith Memorial Basketball Hall of Fame as a coach |
| *^ | Active NBA coach who has been elected to the Naismith Memorial Basketball Hall of Fame |

| Coach | Team(s) coached | SC | SW | SL | Win% | App. | Championships |
|---|---|---|---|---|---|---|---|
| Phil Jackson* | • Chicago Bulls (1989–1998) • Los Angeles Lakers (1999–2004, 2005–2011) | 65 | 56 | 9 | .862 | 20 | 11 |
| Pat Riley* | • Los Angeles Lakers (1981–1990) • New York Knicks (1991–1995) • Miami Heat (1995–2003, 2005–2008) | 56 | 40 | 16 | .714 | 21 | 5 |
| Gregg Popovich* | • San Antonio Spurs (1996–2025) | 54 | 37 | 17 | .685 | 22 | 5 |
| Jerry Sloan* | • Chicago Bulls (1979–1982) • Utah Jazz (1988–2011) | 40 | 20 | 20 | .500 | 20 | 0 |
| Doc Rivers* | • Orlando Magic (1999–2003) • Boston Celtics (2004–2013) • Los Angeles Clippers (2013–2020) • Philadelphia 76ers (2020–2023) • Milwaukee Bucks (2024–2026) | 37 | 17 | 20 | .459 | 21 | 1 |
| Larry Brown* | • Denver Nuggets (1976–1979) • New Jersey Nets (1981–1983) • San Antonio Spurs (1988–1992) • Los Angeles Clippers (1992–1993) • Indiana Pacers (1993–1997) • Philadelphia 76ers (1997–2003) • Detroit Pistons (2003–2005) • New York Knicks (2005–2006) • Charlotte Bobcats (2008–2010) | 36 | 19 | 17 | .528 | 18 | 1 |
| Lenny Wilkens* | • Seattle SuperSonics (1969–1972, 1977–1985) • Portland Trail Blazers (1974–1976) • Cleveland Cavaliers (1986–1993) • Atlanta Hawks (1993–2000) • Toronto Raptors (2000–2003) • New York Knicks (2004–2005) | 36 | 17 | 19 | .472 | 20 | 1 |
| Erik Spoelstra^ | • Miami Heat (2008–present) | 35 | 23 | 12 | .657 | 14 | 2 |
| George Karl* | • Cleveland Cavaliers (1984–1986) • Golden State Warriors (1986–1988) • Seattle SuperSonics (1992–1998) • Milwaukee Bucks (1998–2003) • Denver Nuggets (2005–2013) • Sacramento Kings (2015–2016) | 35 | 13 | 22 | .371 | 22 | 0 |
| Red Auerbach* | • Washington Capitols (1946–1949) • Tri-Cities Blackhawks (1949–1950) • Boston Celtics (1950–1966) | 34 | 24 | 10 | .706 | 19 | 9 |
| Don Nelson* | • Milwaukee Bucks (1976–1987) • Golden State Warriors (1988–1995, 2006–2010) • New York Knicks (1995–1996) • Dallas Mavericks (1997–2005) | 33 | 15 | 18 | .455 | 18 | 0 |
| Rick Carlisle^ | • Detroit Pistons (2001–2003) • Indiana Pacers (2003–2007, 2021–present) • Dallas Mavericks (2008–2021) | 31 | 16 | 15 | .516 | 16 | 1 |
| Rick Adelman* | • Portland Trail Blazers (1989–1994) • Golden State Warriors (1996–1997) • Sacramento Kings (1998–2006) • Houston Rockets (2007–2011) • Minnesota Timberwolves (2011–2014) | 30 | 14 | 16 | .467 | 16 | 0 |
| Steve Kerr^ | • Golden State Warriors (2014–present) | 28 | 24 | 4 | .857 | 8 | 4 |
| K. C. Jones | • Capital / Washington Bullets (1973–1976) • Boston Celtics (1983–1988) • Seattle SuperSonics (1990–1992) | 26 | 18 | 8 | .692 | 10 | 2 |
| Chuck Daly* | • Cleveland Cavaliers (1981–1982) • Detroit Pistons (1983–1992) • New Jersey Nets (1992–1994) • Orlando Magic (1997–1999) | 26 | 16 | 10 | .615 | 12 | 2 |
| John Kundla* | • Minneapolis Lakers (1948–1958, 1958–1959) | 25 | 20 | 5 | .833 | 10 | 5 |
| Dick Motta | • Chicago Bulls (1968–1976) • Washington Bullets (1976–1980) • Dallas Mavericks (1980–1987, 1994–1996) • Sacramento Kings (1990–1991) • Denver Nuggets (1996–1997) | 24 | 11 | 13 | .458 | 14 | 1 |
| Bill Fitch* | • Cleveland Cavaliers (1970–1979) • Boston Celtics (1979–1983) • Houston Rockets (1983–1988) • New Jersey Nets (1989–1992) • Los Angeles Clippers (1994–1998) | 23 | 11 | 12 | .478 | 13 | 1 |
| Billy Cunningham | • Philadelphia 76ers (1977–1985) | 22 | 15 | 7 | .682 | 8 | 1 |
| Jack Ramsay* | • Philadelphia 76ers (1969–1972) • Buffalo Braves (1973–1976) • Portland Trail Blazers (1977–1986) • Indiana Pacers (1986–1988) | 22 | 7 | 15 | .318 | 16 | 1 |
| John MacLeod | • Phoenix Suns (1973–1987) • Dallas Mavericks (1987–1989) • New York Knicks (1990–1991) | 21 | 10 | 11 | .476 | 11 | 0 |
| Mike Brown^ | • Cleveland Cavaliers (2005–2010, 2013–2014) • Los Angeles Lakers (2011–2012) • Sacramento Kings (2022–2024) • New York Knicks (2025–present) | 20 | 13 | 7 | .650 | 8 | 1 |
| Red Holzman* | • Milwaukee / St. Louis Hawks (1954–1957) • New York Knicks (1967–1977, 1978–1982) | 20 | 12 | 8 | .600 | 10 | 2 |
| Mike D'Antoni | • Denver Nuggets (1998–1999) • Phoenix Suns (2003–2008) • New York Knicks (2008–2012) • Los Angeles Lakers (2012–2014) • Houston Rockets (2016–2020) | 20 | 10 | 10 | .500 | 10 | 0 |

== Notes ==
- ^{a} Each year is linked to an article about that particular BAA/NBA season.
- ^{b} Each year is linked to an article about the BAA/NBA Finals in that year.

== See also ==
- List of current National Basketball Association head coaches
- List of National Basketball Association player-coaches
- List of college men's basketball coaches with 600 wins
- NBA records
