= Chuck Daly Lifetime Achievement Award =

Basketball coach award

Chuck Daly Lifetime Achievement Award is an annual award given by the National Basketball Coaches Association (NBCA) to honor a longtime NBA coach's life in basketball and his "standard of integrity, competitive excellence and tireless promotion" of the game. The inaugural award winner was Tom Heinsohn. The award is named after former NBA head coach Chuck Daly.

== Winners ==
*	Elected to the Naismith Memorial Basketball Hall of Fame

Season	Coach	Nationality	Teams coached
2008–09	Tom Heinsohn	United States	Boston Celtics (1969–1978)
2009–10	Jack Ramsay	United States	Philadelphia 76ers (1968–1972); Buffalo Braves (1972–1976); Portland Trail Blazers (1976–1986); Indiana Pacers (1986–1988)
2009–10	Tex Winter	United States	Houston Rockets (1971–1973); Chicago Bulls (1985–1999) (assistant coach); Los Angeles Lakers (1999–2008) (assistant coach)
2010–11	Lenny Wilkens	United States	Seattle SuperSonics (1969–1972; 1977–1986); Portland Trail Blazers (1974–1976); Cleveland Cavaliers (1986–1993); Atlanta Hawks (1993–2000); Toronto Raptors (2000–2003); New York Knicks (2004–2005)
2011–12	Pat Riley	United States	Los Angeles Lakers (1981–1990); New York Knicks (1991–1995); Miami Heat (1995–2003; 2005–2008)
2012–13	Bill Fitch	United States	Cleveland Cavaliers (1970–1979); Boston Celtics (1980–1983); Houston Rockets (1983–1988); New Jersey Nets (1989–1992); Los Angeles Clippers (1994–1998)
2013–14	Bernie Bickerstaff	United States	Seattle SuperSonics (1985–1989; 1989–1990); Denver Nuggets (1995–1996); Washington Bullets/Wizards (1997–1999); Charlotte Bobcats (2004–2007); Los Angeles Lakers (2012)
2014–15	Dick Motta	United States	Chicago Bulls (1968–1976); Washington Bullets (1976–1980); Dallas Mavericks (1980–1987; 1994–1996); Sacramento Kings (1990–1991); Denver Nuggets (1996–1997)
2015–16	K.C. Jones	United States	Capital/Washington Bullets (1973–1976); Boston Celtics (1983–1988); Seattle SuperSonics (1990–1992)
2015–16	Jerry Sloan	United States	Chicago Bulls (1979–1982); Utah Jazz (1988–2011)
2016–17	Al Attles	United States	Golden State Warriors (1969–1983)
2016–17	Hubie Brown	United States	Kentucky Colonels (1974–1976); Atlanta Hawks (1976–1981); New York Knicks (1982–1987); Memphis Grizzlies (2002–2005)
2017–18	Doug Moe	United States	San Antonio Spurs (1976–1980); Denver Nuggets (1980–1991); Philadelphia 76ers (1992–1993)
2018–19	Frank Layden	United States	Utah Jazz (1981–1989)
2019–20	Del Harris	United States	Houston Rockets (1979–1983); Milwaukee Bucks (1987–1991); Los Angeles Lakers (1994–1999)
2020–21	Larry Brown	United States	San Antonio Spurs (1988–1992); Los Angeles Clippers (1992–1993); Indiana Pacers (1993–1997); Philadelphia 76ers (1997–2003); Detroit Pistons (2003–2005); New York Knicks (2005–2006); Charlotte Bobcats (2008–2010)
2021–22	Mike Fratello	United States	Atlanta Hawks (1983–1990); Cleveland Cavaliers (1993–1999); Memphis Grizzlies (2004–2006)
2022–23	Rick Adelman	United States	Portland Trail Blazers (1989–1994); Golden State Warriors (1995–1997); Sacramento Kings (1999–2006); Houston Rockets (2007–2011); Minnesota Timberwolves (2011–2014)
2023–24	Rudy Tomjanovich	United States	Houston Rockets (1992–2003); Los Angeles Lakers (2004–2005)
2024–25	Don Nelson	United States	Milwaukee Bucks (1976–1988); Golden State Warriors (1988–1995; 2006–2010); New York Knicks (1995–1996); Dallas Mavericks (1997–2005)
2025–26	Paul Westhead	United States	Los Angeles Lakers (1979–1981); Chicago Bulls (1982–1983); Denver Nuggets (1990–1992)

== Notes ==
- Jack Ramsay, Bill Fitch, Pat Riley, Jerry Sloan, Tex Winter, Hubie Brown, Rudy Tomjanovich and Don Nelson were inducted into the Naismith Memorial Basketball Hall of Fame as coaches. Ramsey was also inducted into the National Collegiate Basketball Hall of Fame as a coach.
- Tom Heinsohn and Lenny Wilkens were inducted into the Naismith Memorial Basketball Hall of Fame as players and coaches. They were also inducted into the National Collegiate Basketball Hall of Fame as players.
- K. C. Jones was inducted into the Naismith Memorial Basketball Hall of Fame as a player. He also inducted into the National Collegiate Basketball Hall of Fame as a player.
- Five of these winners were named Top 10 Coaches in NBA History in 1996: Bill Fitch, Pat Riley, Lenny Wilkens, Jack Ramsay and Don Nelson.
- Seven of these winners were named Top 15 Coaches in NBA History in 2022: Pat Riley, Lenny Wilkens, Jack Ramsay, Jerry Sloan, K. C. Jones, Larry Brown and Don Nelson.
- None of the recipients were posthumous at the time they won the award.
