= List of NBA player-coaches =

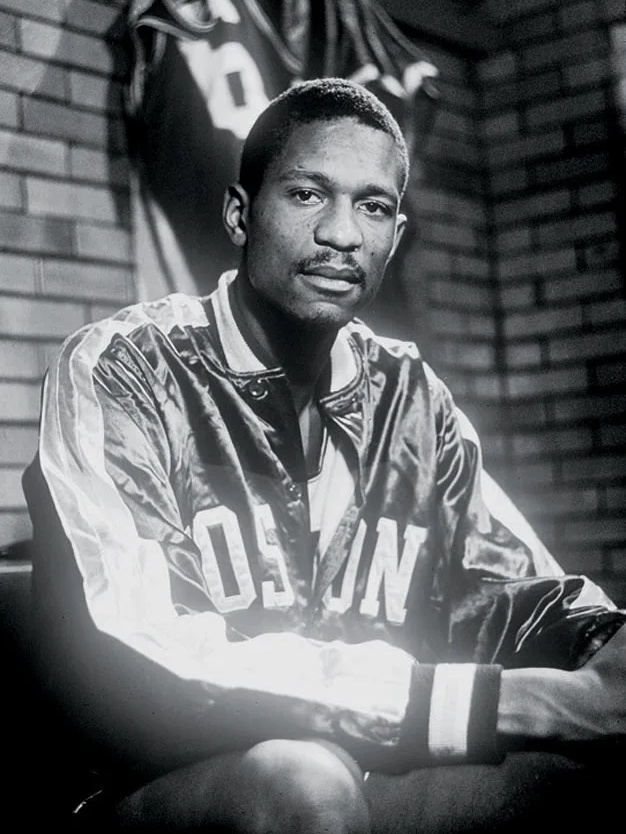
Bill Russell won two NBA championships as a player-coach of the Boston Celtics.

A player-coach is a member of team who simultaneously holds both playing and coaching duties. The term can be used to refer to both players who serve as head coaches or as assistant coaches. In the National Basketball Association (NBA), there have been 40 players who also served as their teams' head coaches at the same time. The NBA was founded in 1946 as the Basketball Association of America (BAA). The league adopted its current name at the start of the 1949–50 season when it merged with the National Basketball League (NBL). After the salary cap was instituted in 1984–85 season, the NBA has prohibited teams from employing a player-coach. The ruling was established to avoid the possibility that a team would circumvent the cap by signing a player as a player-coach, as coaches' salaries are not counted under the cap.

Ed Sadowski was the first player-coach in the league. In the BAA's inaugural season, he played for the Toronto Huskies and also served as the team's first head coach. Buddy Jeannette was the first player-coach to win the championship; he won the 1948 BAA Finals with the Baltimore Bullets. Bill Russell is the only other player-coach who has won the championship, as well as the only player-coach to win multiple championships. In 1966, he took over the Boston Celtics' head coaching duties from Red Auerbach, becoming the first African American head coach in the league. He served as the Celtics' player-coach for three seasons, winning two consecutive NBA championships in 1968 and 1969. Dave DeBusschere became the youngest head coach in the league's history when he was appointed as the Detroit Pistons' player-coach at the age of 24 in 1964. He held the position for three seasons before returning to a full-time player in 1967. Dave Cowens is the last player-coach in the league. He coached the Celtics in the 1978–79 season before relinquishing his coaching duty to focus on his playing career.

Richie Guerin had coached 372 games as a player-coach, the most among the other player-coaches. He was the player-coach of the St. Louis / Atlanta Hawks for five seasons, from 1964 to 1967 and from 1968 to 1970. Before the 1967–68 season, he retired from playing to become a full-time head coach. However, he came back from retirement to play in the following two seasons while still serving as the Hawks' head coach. Lenny Wilkens, who is in second place for highest number of games as a player-coach, was the only player-coach who has been employed by more than one team. He spent three seasons as the Seattle SuperSonics' player-coach and one season as the Portland Trail Blazers' player-coach. He is the only player-coach (along with Russell) who has been inducted to the Naismith Memorial Basketball Hall of Fame as both a player and a coach. Other than Wilkens, twelve player-coaches have been inducted as players while two player-coaches have been inducted as coaches. The Coach of the Year Award was never won by a player-coach.

Wilkens went on to become the longest-tenured head coach in the league. In addition to 4 seasons as a player-coach, he spent another 28 seasons as a head coach, winning an NBA championship in 1979. San Francisco Warriors player-coach Al Attles retired from playing duty in 1971, but continued to coach the Warriors for another 12 seasons, leading them to an NBA championship in 1975. Alex Hannum, Red Holzman and Kevin Loughery, who served as player-coaches for less than a season, had a lengthy coaching career in the NBA which lasted more than 10 seasons. Hannum spent 11 seasons as a full-time head coach, winning two NBA championships with two different teams. Holzman coached the Hawks for 4 seasons, including a season as a player-coach, and the New York Knicks for 14 seasons. He led the latter to two NBA championships. Loughery served as the head coach for six NBA teams during his 18-year coaching career, including a year as a player-coach. Wilkens and Holzman were named among the Top 10 Coaches in NBA History announced at the league's 50th anniversary in 1996. Wilkens, along with Bob Cousy, Dave Cowens, Dave DeBusschere, Bob Pettit, Bill Russell and Dolph Schayes, were named to the list of the 50 Greatest Players in NBA History, which was also announced at the league's 50th anniversary.

== Key ==
Yrs	Number of years coached
G	Games coached
W	Wins
L	Losses
Win%	Winning percentage
^	Elected to the Naismith Memorial Basketball Hall of Fame as a player
*	Elected to the Naismith Memorial Basketball Hall of Fame as a coach
^*	Elected to the Naismith Memorial Basketball Hall of Fame as both a player and a coach
**	Currently Active Player

== Player-coaches ==
Player-coach	Team(s) played and coached	Years^{[a]}	G	W	L	Win%	G	W	L	Win%	Championship(s) won^{[b]}	Honor(s) and award(s) won^{[c]}	Ref(s).
Player-coach	Team(s) played and coached	Years^{[a]}	Regular season				Playoffs				Championship(s) won^{[b]}	Honor(s) and award(s) won^{[c]}	Ref(s).
Richie Guerin^	St. Louis Hawks; Atlanta Hawks	1964–1967; 1968–1970	372	199	173	.535	43	21	22	.488	None	All-Star Game head coach (1969, 1970)	
Lenny Wilkens^*	Seattle SuperSonics; Portland Trail Blazers	1969–1972; 1974–1975	328	159	169	.485	—	—	—	—	None	All-Star (1969, 1971); All-Star Game MVP (1971)	
Paul Seymour	Syracuse Nationals	1956–1960	279	155	124	.556	20	9	11	.450	None	None	
Al Cervi^	Syracuse Nationals	1949–1953	267	170	90	.637	27	13	14	.481	None	All-NBA Team (1950); All-Star Game head coach (1952)	
Bill Russell^*	Boston Celtics	1966–1969	245	162	83	.661	46	28	16	.609	2 (1968, 1969)	All-NBA Team (1968, 1969); All-Defensive Team (1969); All-Star (1967, 1968, 1969)	
Dave DeBusschere^	Detroit Pistons	1964–1967	222	79	143	.356	—	—	—	—	None	All-Star (1966, 1967)	
Buddy Jeannette^	Baltimore Bullets^{[d]}	1947–1950	176	82	94	.466	15	10	5	.667	1 (1948)	All-BAA Team (1948)	
Bobby Wanzer^	Rochester Royals	1955–1957	144	62	82	.431	—	—	—	—	None	All-Star (1956); All-Star Game head coach (1957)	
Carl Braun	New York Knicks	1959–1961	127	40	87	.315	—	—	—	—	None	None	
Al Attles	San Francisco Warriors	1970–1971	112	49	63	.438	5	1	4	.200	None	None	
Bob Cousy^	Cincinnati Royals	1969–1970	82	36	46	.439	—	—	—	—	None	None	
Dolph Schayes^	Philadelphia 76ers	1963–1964	80	34	46	.425	5	2	3	.400	None	None	
Andrew Levane	Milwaukee Hawks	1952–1953	71	27	44	.380	—	—	—	—	None	None	
Bob Feerick	Washington Capitols	1949–1950	68	32	36	.471	2	0	2	.000	None	None	
Dave Cowens^	Boston Celtics	1978–1979	68	27	41	.397	—	—	—	—	None	None	
Ed Macauley^	St. Louis Hawks	1958–1959	62	43	19	.694	6	2	4	.333	None	All-Star Game head coach (1959)	
Jimmy Darden	Denver Nuggets^{[e]}	1949–1950	62	51	41	.177	—	—	—	—	None	None	
Grady Lewis	St. Louis Bombers	1948–1949	60	29	31	.483	2	0	2	.000	None	None	
Curly Armstrong	Fort Wayne Pistons	1948–1949	54	22	32	.407	—	—	—	—	None	None	
Tom Marshall	Cincinnati Royals	1958–1959	54	16	38	.296	—	—	—	—	None	None	
Mike Todorovich	Tri-Cities Blackhawks	1950–1951	42	14	28	.333	—	—	—	—	None	None	
Bobby Leonard	Chicago Zephyrs	1962–1963	42	13	29	.310	—	—	—	—	None	None	
Dick McGuire^	Detroit Pistons	1959–1960	41	17	24	.415	2	0	2	.000	None	None	
Fred Scolari	Baltimore Bullets^{[d]}	1951–1952	39	12	27	.308	—	—	—	—	None	All-Star (1952)	
Howie Schultz	Anderson Packers^{[f]}	1949–1950	35	21	14	.600	—	—	—	—	None	None	
Bones McKinney	Washington Capitols	1950–1951	35	10	25	.286	—	—	—	—	None	None	
Charley Shipp	Waterloo Hawks^{[g]}	1949–1950	35	8	27	.229	—	—	—	—	None	None	
Alex Hannum*	St. Louis Hawks	1957	31	15	16	.484	12	8	4	.667	None	None	
Kevin Loughery	Philadelphia 76ers	1973	31	5	26	.161	—	—	—	—	None	None	
Walt Budko	Baltimore Bullets^{[d]}	1951	29	10	19	.345	—	—	—	—	None	None	
Nat Hickey	Providence Steamrollers	1948	29	4	25	.138	—	—	—	—	None	None	
Jack Smiley	Waterloo Hawks^{[g]}	1950	27	11	16	.407	—	—	—	—	None	None	
Red Holzman*	Milwaukee Hawks	1954	26	10	16	.385	—	—	—	—	None	None	
Bruce Hale	Indianapolis Jets	1948	17	4	13	.235	—	—	—	—	None	None	
Ed Sadowski	Toronto Huskies	1946	12	3	9	.250	—	—	—	—	None	None	
Slater Martin^	St. Louis Hawks	1957	8	5	3	.625	—	—	—	—	None	All-NBA Team (1957); All-Star (1957)	
Bob Pettit^	St. Louis Hawks	1962	6	4	2	.667	—	—	—	—	None	All-NBA Team (1962); All-Star (1962); All-Star Game MVP (1962)	
Johnny Logan	Tri-Cities Blackhawks	1950	3	2	1	.667	—	—	—	—	None	None	
Dick Fitzgerald	Toronto Huskies	1946	3	2	1	.667	—	—	—	—	None	None	
Terry Dischinger	Detroit Pistons	1971	2	0	2	.000	—	—	—	—	None	None	

== Notes ==
- ^{a} Each year is linked to an article about that particular BAA / NBA season.
- ^{b} Each year is linked to an article about the BAA / NBA Finals in that year.
- ^{c} Each year is linked to an article about that particular BAA / NBA season or the NBA All-Star Game in that year.
- ^{d 1} ^{2} ^{3} The original Baltimore Bullets, who folded in 1954, are not affiliated with the present-day Washington Wizards, who were known as the Baltimore / Capital / Washington Bullets from 1963 to 1997.
- ^{e} The original Denver Nuggets, who folded in 1950, are not affiliated with the present-day Denver Nuggets, who were founded in 1967 as a member of American Basketball Association (ABA).
- ^{f} The Anderson Packers, who folded in 1950, are not affiliated with the present-day Washington Wizards, who were known as the Chicago Packers from 1961 to 1962.
- ^{g 1} ^{2} The Waterloo Hawks, who folded in 1950, are not affiliated with the present-day Atlanta Hawks, who were also known as the Milwaukee / St. Louis Hawks from 1951 to 1968.

== See also ==
- List of National Basketball Association players
- List of National Basketball Association head coaches with 400 games coached
