= Mike Fratello =

American basketball coach, sports broadcaster (born 1947)

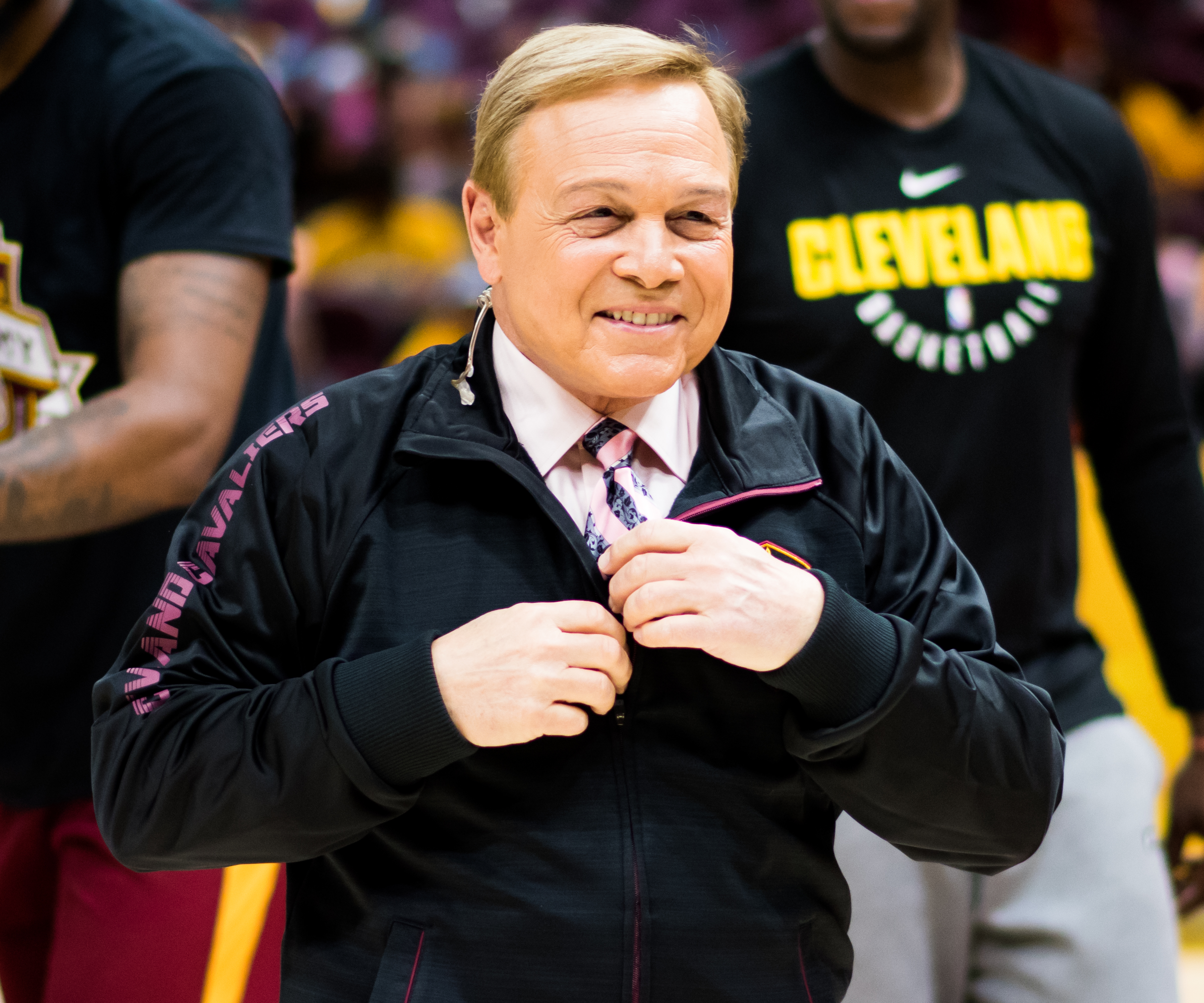
- Fratello in 2018

Personal information
- Born: February 24, 1947 (age 79) North Haledon, New Jersey, U.S.
- Listed height: 5 ft 7 in (170 cm)
- Listed weight: 150 lb (68 kg)

Career information
- High school: Hackensack (Hackensack, New Jersey)
- College: Montclair State
- Coaching career: 1970–2014

Career highlights
- As head coach: NBA Coach of the Year (1986); NBA All-Star Game head coach (1988); Chuck Daly Lifetime Achievement Award (2022); As assistant coach: Eastern 8 champion (1978)

Career coaching record
- NBA: 667–548 (.549)
- Record at Basketball Reference

Michael Robert Fratello (born February 24, 1947), nicknamed "the Czar", is an American sports broadcaster and former professional basketball coach. He is currently a part-time analyst for FanDuel Sports Network Ohio for the Cleveland Cavaliers and a part-time color commentator for FanDuel Sports Network SoCal for the Los Angeles Clippers.

Fratello previously coached the Atlanta Hawks, Cleveland Cavaliers, and Memphis Grizzlies of the National Basketball Association (NBA), served as NBC's lead analyst, as YES Network's color commentator/studio analyst for the Brooklyn Nets, as a commentator/studio analyst for NBA TV and for nationally televised games on TNT and was also the head coach of the Ukraine national basketball team.

Fratello is among the winningest head coaches in NBA history, ranking respectively 18th and 19th in all-time regular season wins (667) and games coached (1,215).

== Early life ==
Michael Robert Fratello was born on February 24, 1947, in Hackensack, New Jersey and North Haledon, New Jersey, to his parents, Vincent and Marie. He is of Italian descent. He graduated from Hackensack High School, where he was captain of the basketball, baseball, and football teams. He was named to the Bergen "All County" Football team as a center in his senior year.

== College career ==
Fratello then went on to Montclair State College in Montclair, New Jersey to play football.

== Coaching career ==
Upon graduation he returned to Hackensack High School as an assistant for both the basketball and football teams.

=== Rhode Island (1970–1972) ===
Fratello then went on to the University of Rhode Island as a graduate assistant assigned to head coach Tom Carmody, also coaching the University of Rhode Island freshman basketball team.

=== James Madison (1972–1975) ===
Fratello was an assistant coach at James Madison University under Lou Campanelli.

=== Villanova (1975–1978) ===
Fratello was an assistant coach at Villanova under Rollie Massimino before going to the NBA as an assistant coach for the Atlanta Hawks during Hubie Brown's tenure.

=== Atlanta Hawks (1983–1990) ===
Fratello coached the Hawks for seven seasons and posted a 324–250 record, making the post-season playoffs five times and winning the Central Division in 1987 with 57 wins. Fratello was named Coach of the Year for the 1985–86 NBA season. His NBA career stats are 667 wins and 548 losses for a .549 average. His teams have qualified for the playoffs in eleven of his 16 seasons as a head coach.

=== Cleveland Cavaliers (1993–1999) ===
In his six seasons with the Cleveland Cavaliers his record was 248 wins and 212 losses. Fratello took the Cavaliers to the playoffs four times.

=== Memphis Grizzlies (2004–2006) ===
Fratello was head coach of the Memphis Grizzlies from December 2004 to December 2006. In his first season, he inherited a 5–11 team that he turned around to win 40 games and advance to the playoffs. Fratello built on that record the following year to win 49 games and return to the playoffs for a second consecutive season. Before departing in December 2006, his record was 6–24 taking his overall record with Memphis to 95–83.

=== Ukraine (2011–2014) ===
On February 24, 2011, Fratello was officially announced as the Ukraine national basketball team head coach and on March 3, 2011, he was introduced to the Ukrainian media at a press conference in Kyiv. After the successes he provided for Ukraine, including their first ever FIBA World Cup appearance, it was announced that Fratello would not coach for Ukraine for EuroBasket 2015. He would be replaced by Yevgin Murzin as the nation's Team Ukraine basketball team.

== Broadcasting career ==
=== Los Angeles Clippers ===
Fratello started as the lead color analyst for the Los Angeles Clippers from 1990 to 1992. He returned to the Clippers for the 2019 season as a rotating analyst on TV.

=== NBC / TNT ===
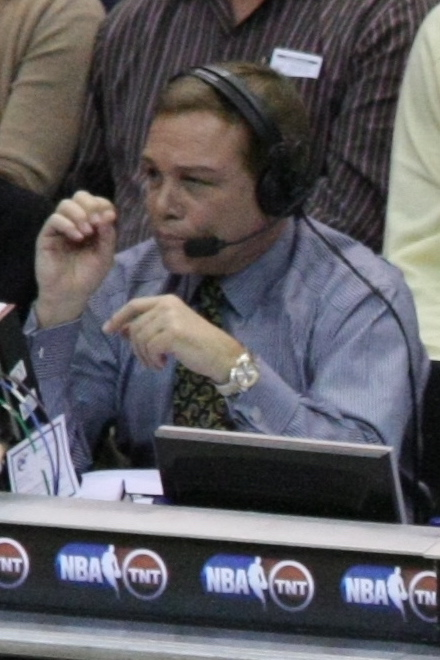
Fratello in 2015

Fratello has been a television commentator for NBC Sports and also a main color commentator of TNT, working once again with longtime play-by-play announcer Marv Albert, who first paired up with Fratello in the 1990–91 NBA season as the main announcing team for the NBA on NBC. Starting with the 2008–09 NBA season, Fratello also began working with Marv Albert doing New Jersey Nets games on the YES Network.

During his stint as a color commentator, Marv Albert dubbed him "The Czar of the Telestrator" for his masterful way of diagramming basketball plays on screen.

=== Miami Heat ===
From 2002 to 2004, Fratello was the lead analyst for games for the Miami Heat on The Sunshine Network. Fratello left this position to take over as head coach of the Memphis Grizzlies after the resignation of Hubie Brown in December 2004.

=== Return to TNT ===
For the 2007–08 season, TNT rehired Fratello as a full-time commentator, allowing him to work once again with Marv Albert at NBA on TNT. Reggie Miller, who had split time between TNT's studio and the booth the past two years, also became a full-time game analyst, joining Albert and Fratello on the sidelines. Due to his affiliation with TNT, Fratello was also used at various points through his TNT run as a studio analyst for NBA TV.

Prior to Kerr's departure in the summer of 2014 to become the head coach of the Golden State Warriors, he was part of a three-man booth with his YES counterpart Marv Albert and Steve Kerr. He left the network after the 2018–2019 season.

=== With the YES Network ===
Starting with the 2008–09 season, Fratello had worked with Marv Albert and Ian Eagle on New Jersey/Brooklyn Nets games on the YES Network. Fratello was hired after the unexpected resignation of former color analyst Mark Jackson from the network. For the 2017-18 season, he served as a studio analyst. At the end of that season, he left the network to join the team at NBA TV on a full-time basis. Former Net Richard Jefferson was named as his successor.

=== Cavaliers and NBA TV ===
After leaving the YES Network, Fratello joined the Cavaliers broadcasting team, working exclusively in the studio for in-studio analysis. Fratello also joined the crew at NBA TV, working once again in the studio as an analyst.

=== Second return to TNT and NBC ===
When Marv Albert announced that he would be retiring after the conclusion of the 2021 NBA season, TNT brought back Fratello for a broadcasting reunion with Albert, with both calling the play-in game between the Washington Wizards and the Indiana Pacers on May 20, 2021. Fratello would also return for The NBA on NBC in a Tuesday Throwback broadcast with Bob Costas and Doug Collins on March 3rd, 2026 and then did a few more games with the network for the rest of the season.

== Head coaching record ==
Legend
| Regular season | G | Games coached | W | Games won | L | Games lost | W–L % | Win–loss % |
| Playoffs | PG | Playoff games | PW | Playoff wins | PL | Playoff losses | PW–L % | Playoff win–loss % |

| Team | Year | G | W | L | W–L% | Finish | PG | PW | PL | PW–L% | Result |
|---|---|---|---|---|---|---|---|---|---|---|---|
| Atlanta | 1980–81 | 3 | 0 | 3 | .000 | (interim) | — | — | — | — | — |
| Atlanta | 1983–84 | 82 | 40 | 42 | .488 | 3rd in Central | 5 | 2 | 3 | .400 | Lost in First Round |
| Atlanta | 1984–85 | 82 | 34 | 48 | .415 | 5th in Central | — | — | — | — | Missed playoffs |
| Atlanta | 1985–86 | 82 | 50 | 32 | .610 | 2nd in Central | 9 | 4 | 5 | .444 | Lost in Conf. Semifinals |
| Atlanta | 1986–87 | 82 | 57 | 25 | .695 | 1st in Central | 9 | 4 | 5 | .444 | Lost in Conf. Semifinals |
| Atlanta | 1987–88 | 82 | 50 | 32 | .610 | 3rd in Central | 12 | 6 | 6 | .500 | Lost in Conf. Semifinals |
| Atlanta | 1988–89 | 82 | 52 | 30 | .634 | 3rd in Central | 5 | 2 | 3 | .400 | Lost in First Round |
| Atlanta | 1989–90 | 82 | 41 | 41 | .500 | 6th in Central | — | — | — | — | Missed playoffs |
| Cleveland | 1993–94 | 82 | 47 | 35 | .573 | 4th in Central | 3 | 0 | 3 | .000 | Lost in First Round |
| Cleveland | 1994–95 | 82 | 43 | 39 | .524 | 4th in Central | 4 | 1 | 3 | .250 | Lost in First Round |
| Cleveland | 1995–96 | 82 | 47 | 35 | .573 | 3rd in Central | 3 | 0 | 3 | .000 | Lost in First Round |
| Cleveland | 1996–97 | 82 | 42 | 40 | .512 | 5th in Central | — | — | — | — | Missed playoffs |
| Cleveland | 1997–98 | 82 | 47 | 35 | .573 | 5th in Central | 4 | 1 | 3 | .250 | Lost in First Round |
| Cleveland | 1998–99 | 50 | 22 | 28 | .440 | 7th in Central | — | — | — | — | Missed playoffs |
| Memphis | 2004–05 | 66 | 40 | 26 | .606 | 4th in Southwest | 4 | 0 | 4 | .000 | Lost in First Round |
| Memphis | 2005–06 | 82 | 49 | 33 | .598 | 3rd in Southwest | 4 | 0 | 4 | .000 | Lost in First Round |
| Memphis | 2006–07 | 30 | 6 | 24 | .200 | (fired) | — | — | — | — | — |
| Career | | 1,215 | 667 | 548 | .549 | | 62 | 20 | 42 | .323 | |

== Personal life ==
Fratello is married to his wife Susan with two children, a son named Marc and a daughter named Kristi.
