= Jack Ramsay =

American basketball coach and broadcaster (1925–2014)

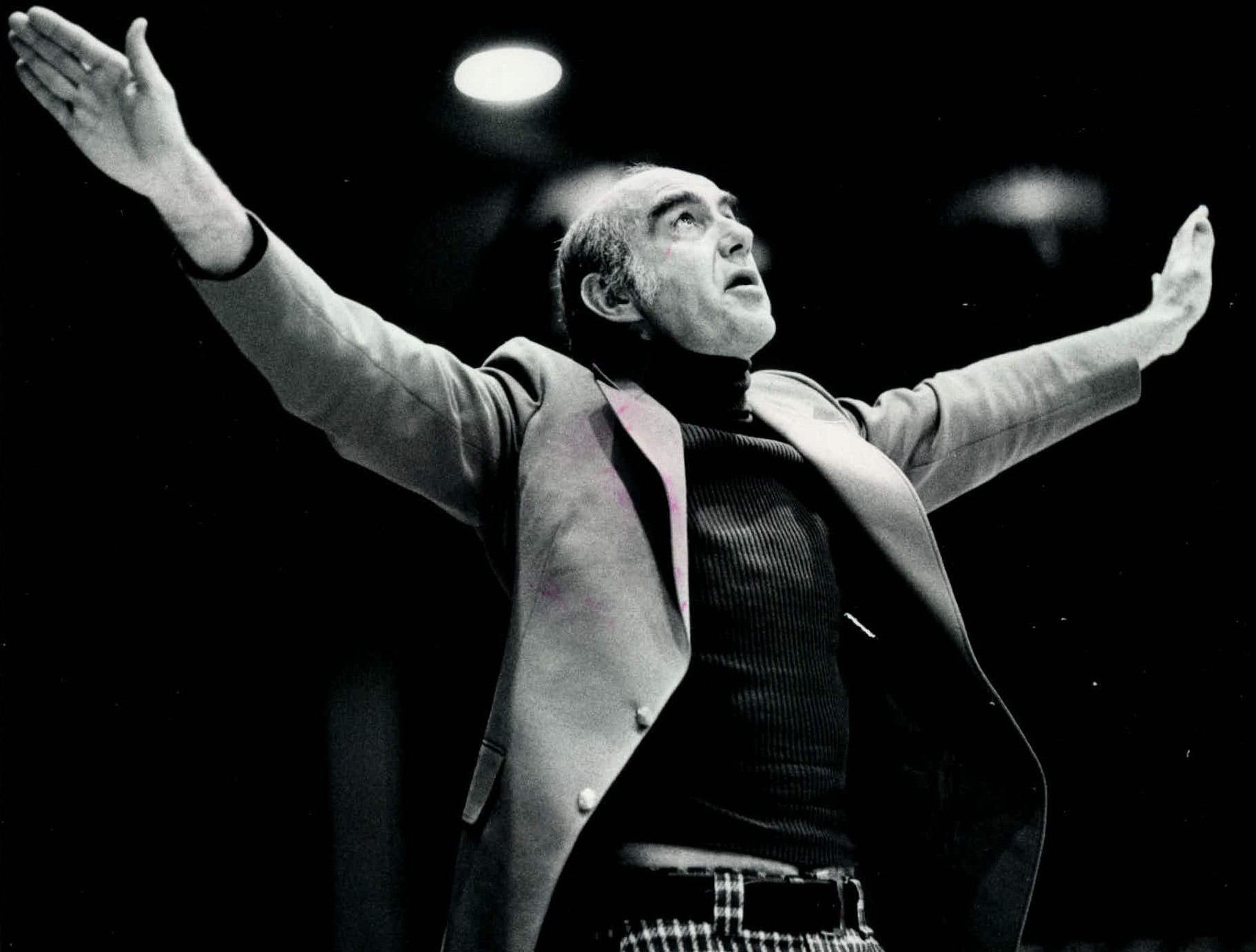
- Ramsay in 1977

Personal information
- Born: February 21, 1925 Philadelphia, Pennsylvania, U.S.
- Died: April 28, 2014 (aged 89) Naples, Florida, U.S.
- Listed height: 6 ft 1 in (1.85 m)
- Listed weight: 180 lb (82 kg)

Career information
- High school: Upper Darby (Upper Darby Township, Pennsylvania)
- College: Saint Joseph's (1942–1943, 1946–1949)
- Playing career: 1949–1955
- Position: Guard
- Coaching career: 1955–1988

Career history

Playing
- 1949–1951: Harrisburg Senators
- 1951–1955: Sunbury Mercuries

Career highlights
- As player: 2× All-EPBL First Team (1952, 1955); 2× All-EPBL Second Team (1951, 1953); As coach: NBA champion (1977); No. 77 retired by Portland Trail Blazers; NBA All-Star Game head coach (1978); Top 10 Coaches in NBA History; Top 15 Coaches in NBA History; Chuck Daly Lifetime Achievement Award (2010); 6× Big 5 champion (1956, 1957, 1959–1961, 1965); As executive: NBA champion (1967)

Career coaching record
- NBA: 864–783 (.525)
- Record at Basketball Reference
- Basketball Hall of Fame
- Collegiate Basketball Hall of Fame

John Travilla Ramsay (February 21, 1925 – April 28, 2014) was an American basketball coach, commonly known as "Dr. Jack" (as he held an earned doctorate). He was best known for leading the Portland Trail Blazers to the 1977 NBA championship, and for his broadcasting work with the Indiana Pacers, the Miami Heat, and for ESPN TV and ESPN Radio. Ramsay was among the most respected coaches in NBA history and a member of the Naismith Memorial Basketball Hall of Fame. He was the winner of the Chuck Daly Lifetime Achievement Award for the 2009–10 NBA season.

== Early life ==
John Travilla Ramsay was born on February 21, 1925, in Philadelphia, Pennsylvania. Growing up in Milford, Connecticut, Ramsay was encouraged to participate in sports in grade school by his parents, Anne and John. The family moved outside Philadelphia and Ramsay graduated from Upper Darby High School in 1942. Years after playing basketball, baseball and soccer in high school, he was inducted into the school's Wall of Fame in 1979.

== College career ==
Strongly encouraged by his mother to attend college, Ramsay entered Saint Joseph's College. Ramsay's college career was interrupted by three years of service in the US Navy during World War II. Ramsay played both basketball and baseball at St. Joseph's. In his senior year, Ramsay was coached in baseball by Ralph Young (baseball), a teammate of professional baseball star Ty Cobb. In 1949, Ramsay became the first member of his family to receive a college bachelor's degree. In 1962, Ramsay obtained his master's degree and in 1963 his doctorate degree in education, both from the University of Pennsylvania in Philadelphia.

== Professional career ==
=== Harrisburg Senators (1949–1951) ===
After graduation, Ramsay played six seasons of professional basketball in the Eastern Professional Basketball League (EPBL). As a sophomore playing guard, he was the second-leading scorer for the Harrisburg Senators in Harrisburg, Pennsylvania.

=== Sunbury Mercuries (1951–1955) ===
Ramsay played for the Sunbury Mercuries from 1951 to 1955.

Ramsay averaged 14 points in his career playing for the Senators and in Sunbury, Pennsylvania professional team. He was selected to the All-EPBL team four times. To supplement his playing income, he coached basketball at St. James High School for Boys in Chester, Pennsylvania and later at Mount Pleasant High School, 1953–4, in Wilmington, Delaware.

== Coaching career ==
=== Saint Joseph's (1955–1966) ===
After coaching in the high school and minor-league ranks during the early postwar years, Ramsay became head coach at St Joseph's in 1955. Ramsay got the job after accidentally meeting the college's moderator of athletics at a Philadelphia Phillies baseball game. Ramsay was hired as coach for the 1955-56 basketball season for $3,500.

In Ramsay's first season at St Joseph, the Hawks went 23–6 to win their first Big 5 crown. This first season also marked the school's first-ever postseason playoff berth, in which St Joseph placed third in the NIT after losing to the University of Dayton. Ramsay would remain at St. Joseph's through 1966, leading the Hawks to six more Big 5 crowns, five straight seasons of first-place finishes in the Middle Atlantic Conference, ten postseason appearances, and a Final Four stint in 1961.

At age 41, after leading his team to a 24–5 record in 1965–66, Ramsay was diagnosed with an edema on the retina of his right eye. Ramsay left his coaching job with the Hawks on the doctors' recommendation that he reduce stress. Ramsay finished with a record of 234–72 in 11 years. He would remain the winningest coach in St. Joseph's history until Phil Martelli passed him in 2005.

=== Philadelphia 76ers (1968–1972) ===
After leaving St Joseph's, Ramsay was hired as general manager by the Philadelphia 76ers. Team owner Irv Kosloff gave Ramsay a three-year $25,000 deal.

In 1968, Ramsay became the 76ers head coach. In Ramsay's first game coaching an NBA team, the 76ers zone press won 114–96 against the Los Angeles Lakers at the Spectrum, even though Lakers players Jerry West, Elgin Baylor and Wilt Chamberlain combined for 71 points. The 76ers finished that first season with Coach Ramsay 55–27. The 76ers led the NBA in scoring (119 points per game) as a result of Ramsay's style of aggressive pressing defense.

In his four seasons as 76ers coach, Ramsay led the team to three playoff appearances. While the 76ers continued to be contenders, it was apparent that they were not the powerhouse that had been in the late 1960s. The team collapsed in 1971–72, when the 76ers posted a 30–52 record and missed the playoffs for the first time in team history. Only five years earlier, the Sixers had fielded the best record in league history.

=== Buffalo Braves (1972–1976) ===
Ramsay signed a three‐year contract to succeed John McCarthy as the third-ever head coach of the Buffalo Braves on April 6, 1972. He inherited a team that finished each of the first two years of its existence in last place in the Atlantic Division. After compiling a losing 21–61 record in that first season in Buffalo, Ramsay had the team double their win total the next season by finishing first among the league's 17 teams in offense (111.6) even though they were last in defense (111.8). That second season in Buffalo had Ramsay leading the Braves to the playoffs, where they pushed the eventual champion Celtics to six games in the conference semifinals. His Buffalo tenure was almost a mirror image of his time with the Sixers—four seasons, three playoff berths; however, he did not leave Buffalo in the sort of wreckage that had occurred in Philadelphia. Instead, owner Paul Snyder was in the process of selling the team to out-of-town interests (the economy of Western New York was unable to support both the Braves and hockey's Sabres as evidenced by the Braves' attendance figures at the time but Snyder lost interest) and Ramsay requested not to be a part of the upheaval. His contract was not renewed on May 3, 1976, the day after the Braves were eliminated by the Celtics from the playoffs. In his four seasons with the Braves, Ramsay compiled a record of 158–170.

=== Portland Trail Blazers (1976–1986) ===
In 1976, Ramsay became the head coach of the Portland Trail Blazers. When Ramsay arrived, the Blazers had not made the playoffs or compiled a winning season record in their six-year history. However, a young Blazers team, led by Bill Walton, was starting to gel. Ramsay also benefited from the 1976 ABA dispersal draft, in which the Blazers obtained power forward Maurice Lucas.

In his first season in Portland (1977), Ramsay led the Blazers to their first NBA title. In his second season, the Blazers were a league-best 50–10 after 60 games and heavily favored to repeat as NBA champions. Ramsay coached the Western Conference side in the 1978 All-Star Game. Unfortunately for the Blazers, Walton broke his foot, but he tried to return for the playoff run. In Game 2, he suffered another injury that X-rays revealed that his navicular bone below the left ankle was broken. Citing the treatment of injuries of him and other teammates by Portland staff, Walton declared he would never play for the team again, and he sat out the entire 1979 season before leaving for the San Diego Clippers in 1980. Ramsay would continue to coach the Blazers until 1986 with general success. However, he never equaled the achievements of his first seasons; during Ramsay's last nine seasons in Portland, the Blazers only won two playoff series and never reached a Conference Final.

=== Indiana Pacers (1986–1988) ===
Ramsay took over as coach of the Indiana Pacers for the 1986–87 season. Ramsay coached the Pacers to their second non-losing record as an NBA team. However, Ramsay was unable to duplicate that success in later seasons. Ramsay resigned as Pacers coach during the 1988–89 season after a 0–7 start.

When Ramsay left the Pacers, he was second on the all-time wins list for NBA coaches with 864 wins, trailing only Red Auerbach. When he retired, Ramsay had the most combined college and professional wins of any coach. In 1992, Ramsay was inducted into the Basketball Hall of Fame. The Trail Blazers retired Number 77 in Ramsay's honor on Jan. 14, 1993, symbolically recognizing the 1977 Championship. In 1996, he was voted one of the 10 greatest coaches in NBA history.

== Broadcasting and media ==
After his coaching career ended, Ramsay spent nine years as a television color commentator for the Philadelphia 76ers and the Miami Heat. The games were broadcast from South Florida's Sunshine Network (now Sun Sports), Fox Sports Florida, and sometimes local Miami station WBFS (then a UPN affiliate). Ramsay worked alongside announcer Eric Reid.

During Ramsay's tenure as Heat commentator, he developed some memorable nicknames and phrases for the Heat players. Whenever point guard Tim Hardaway made a three-point shot, Ramsay shouted, "this away, that away, Hardaway!" When Alonzo Mourning dunked the ball, Ramsay exclaimed "Zo with the stuffa!". Whenever a Heat player made a nice shot, Ramsay screamed "bottom of the net!" Also on ESPN Radio national broadcasts he coined the phrases, "One hand slamma" after a one handed dunk and, "two hand slamma jamma" after a two handed dunk.

Between 1996 and 2012, Ramsay called 15 NBA Finals for ESPN Radio, serving as the network's top analyst. He joined ESPN from the Heat full-time in 2000.

In addition to his TV and radio work, Ramsay authored several books, including The Coach's Art (ISBN 0-917304-36-5) and Dr. Jack's Leadership Lessons Learned From a Lifetime in Basketball (ISBN 0-471-46929-7).Dr.Jack also co-authored several books one of which is entitled “Coaching for Performance Improvement” with Jim Lynch (ISBN 0-7618-2805-2).

== Personal life ==
Ramsay married Jean Duffey in 1954 and remained married to her until her death. Jean contracted Alzheimer's in 2001 and died in 2010. The Ramsays had five children, Susan, John, Sharon (who married Jim O'Brien), Chris, and Carolyn.

Ramsay served in the United States Navy in World War II and was a Navy frogman. Ramsay's unit trained for Operation Downfall. Ramsay continued to be highly physically fit well after his Navy training days and completed triathlons until the age of 70.

Ramsay's son-in-law Jim O'Brien has been the head coach of the Boston Celtics, Philadelphia 76ers, Indiana Pacers and The University of Dayton, and grandson Jack O'Brien was the editor-in-chief of humor website Cracked.com. Grandson Geoff Dailey played baseball at Wesleyan University. His two eldest children, Susan and John, have doctoral degrees and taught at the college level. Another son, John, was an assistant dean at Carleton College. Ramsay counted the late David Halberstam and Gay Talese as his friends. Ramsay was a devout Roman Catholic. An avid amateur tennis player, Ramsay and Van Miller (the Braves' radio announcer and a close friend of Ramsay's) often played as a doubles team.

Ramsay had a pair of concussions in his playing career; one happened while playing a college game in 1948, the second in 1954 during an Eastern League game. In 1999, a routine medical exam revealed an early diagnosis of prostate cancer. The ensuing therapy led to a successful treatment that Ramsay didn't miss a single game that season as commentator. In October 2004, Ramsay was diagnosed with melanoma. He had another bout with the disease in his later years. On May 10, 2013, Ramsay announced that he was again starting cancer treatment, ending his broadcasting career.

== Death ==
Ramsay died of cancer in his sleep the night of April 28, 2014. He was 89. Ramsay's longtime employer ESPN announced his death on Twitter.

== Head coaching record ==
=== NBA ===
Legend
Regular season	G	Games coached	W	Games won	L	Games lost	W–L %	Win–loss %
Playoffs	PG	Playoff games	PW	Playoff wins	PL	Playoff losses	PW–L %	Playoff win–loss %

Team	Year	G	W	L	W–L%	Finish	PG	PW	PL	PW–L%	Result
Philadelphia	1968–69	82	55	27	.671	2nd in East	5	1	4	.200	Lost in Division semifinals
Philadelphia	1969–70	82	42	40	.512	4th in East	5	1	4	.200	Lost in Division semifinals
Philadelphia	1970–71	82	47	35	.573	2nd in Atlantic	7	3	4	.429	Lost in Conf. Semifinals
Philadelphia	1971–72	82	30	52	.366	3rd in Atlantic	—	—	—	—	Missed Playoffs
Buffalo	1972–73	82	21	61	.256	3rd in Atlantic	—	—	—	—	Missed Playoffs
Buffalo	1973–74	82	42	40	.512	3rd in Atlantic	6	2	4	.333	Lost in Conf. Semifinals
Buffalo	1974–75	82	49	33	.598	2nd in Atlantic	7	3	4	.429	Lost in Conf. Semifinals
Buffalo	1975–76	82	46	36	.561	2nd in Atlantic	9	4	5	.444	Lost in Conf. Semifinals
Portland	1976–77	82	49	33	.598	2nd in Pacific	19	14	5	.737	Won NBA Championship
Portland	1977–78	82	58	24	.707	1st in Pacific	6	2	4	.333	Lost in Conf. Semifinals
Portland	1978–79	82	45	37	.549	4th in Pacific	3	1	2	.333	Lost in First round
Portland	1979–80	82	38	44	.463	4th in Pacific	3	1	2	.333	Lost in First round
Portland	1980–81	82	45	37	.549	3rd in Pacific	3	1	2	.333	Lost in First round
Portland	1981–82	82	42	40	.512	5th in Pacific	—	—	—	—	Missed Playoffs
Portland	1982–83	82	46	36	.561	4th in Pacific	7	3	4	.429	Lost in Conf. Semifinals
Portland	1983–84	82	48	34	.585	2nd in Pacific	5	2	3	.400	Lost in First round
Portland	1984–85	82	42	40	.512	2nd in Pacific	9	4	5	.444	Lost in Conf. Semifinals
Portland	1985–86	82	40	42	.482	2nd in Pacific	4	1	3	.250	Lost in First round
Indiana	1986–87	82	41	41	.500	4th in Central	4	1	3	.250	Lost in First round
Indiana	1987–88	82	38	44	.463	6th in Central	—	—	—	—	Missed Playoffs
Indiana	1988–89	7	0	7	.000	(resigned)	—	—	—	—	-
Career		1,647	864	783	.525		102	44	58	.431	

== See also ==
- List of NCAA Division I Men's Final Four appearances by coach
