= Lenny Wilkens =

American basketball player and coach (1937–2025)

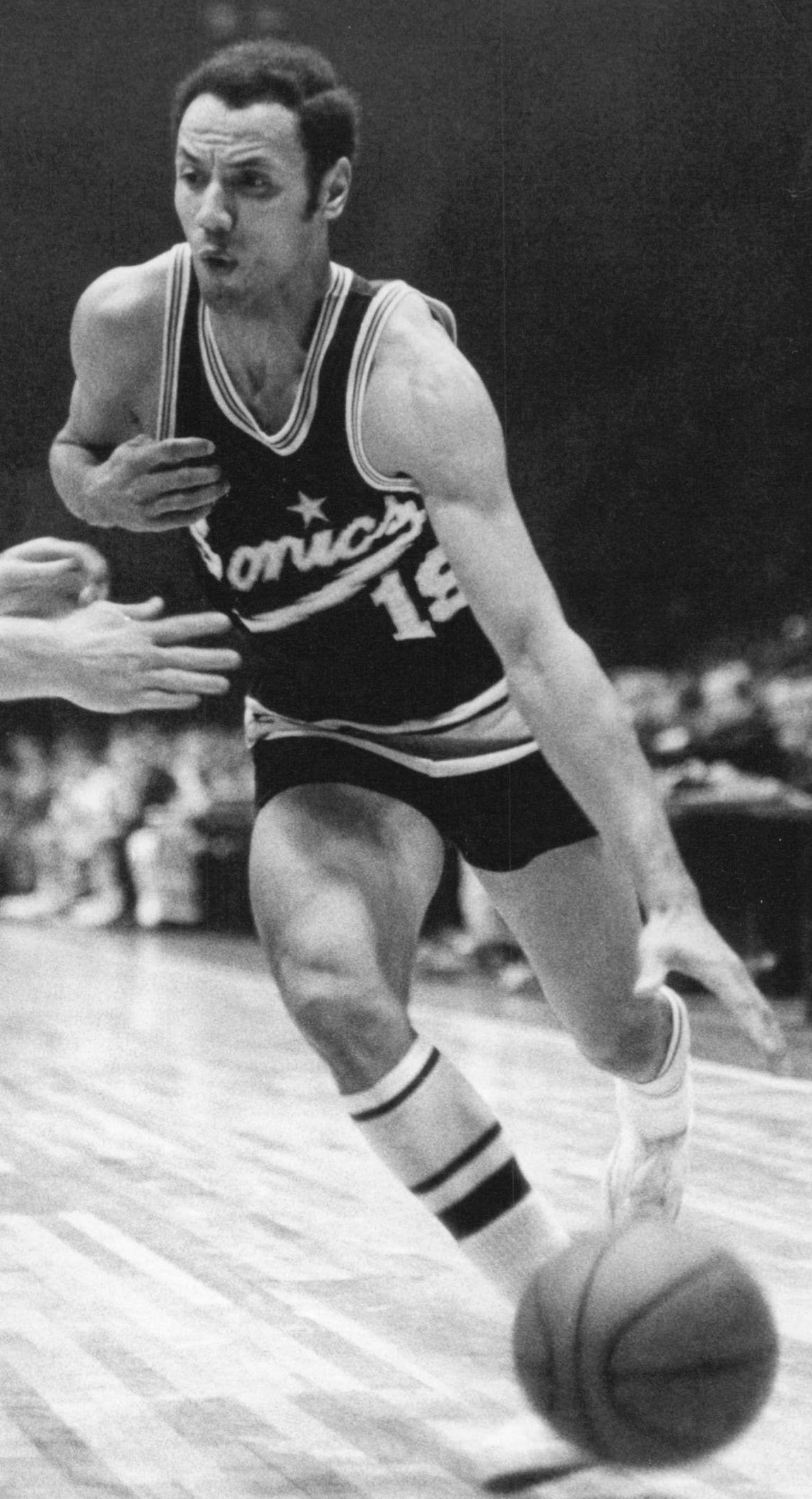
- Wilkens with the Seattle SuperSonics in 1968

Personal information
- Born: October 28, 1937 New York City, New York, U.S.
- Died: November 9, 2025 (aged 88) Medina, Washington, U.S.
- Listed height: 6 ft 1 in (1.85 m)
- Listed weight: 180 lb (82 kg)

Career information
- High school: Boys (Brooklyn, New York)
- College: Providence (1957–1960)
- NBA draft: 1960: 1st round, 6th overall pick
- Drafted by: St. Louis Hawks
- Playing career: 1960–1975
- Position: Point guard
- Number: 32, 15, 14, 19, 17
- Coaching career: 1969–2005

Career history

Playing
- 1960–1968: St. Louis Hawks
- 1968–1972: Seattle SuperSonics
- 1972–1974: Cleveland Cavaliers
- 1974–1975: Portland Trail Blazers

Career highlights
- As player: 9× NBA All-Star (1963–1965, 1967–1971, 1973); NBA All-Star Game MVP (1971); NBA assists leader (1970); NBA anniversary teams (50th, 75th); No. 19 retired by Seattle SuperSonics; Consensus second-team All-American (1960); As coach: NBA champion (1979); NBA Coach of the Year (1994); 4× NBA All-Star Game head coach (1979, 1980, 1989, 1994); Top 10 Coaches in NBA History; Top 15 Coaches in NBA History; Chuck Daly Lifetime Achievement Award (2011)

Career playing statistics
- Points: 17,772 (16.5 ppg)
- Rebounds: 5,030 (4.7 rpg)
- Assists: 7,211 (6.7 apg)
- Stats at NBA.com
- Stats at Basketball Reference

Career coaching record
- NBA: 1332–1155 (.536)
- Record at Basketball Reference
- Basketball Hall of Fame (playing)
- Basketball Hall of Fame (coaching)
- Collegiate Basketball Hall of Fame

Leonard Randolph Wilkens (October 28, 1937 – November 9, 2025) was an American professional basketball player and coach in the National Basketball Association (NBA). He has been inducted three times into the Naismith Memorial Basketball Hall of Fame, first in 1989 as a player, as a coach in 1998, and in 2010 as part of the 1992 United States Olympic "Dream Team" for which he was an assistant coach. In 1996, Wilkens was named to the NBA 50th Anniversary Team, and in 2021 he was named to the NBA 75th Anniversary Team. In addition, in 2022 he was also named to the list of the 15 Greatest Coaches in NBA History, being the only person to be in both NBA 75th anniversary lists as a player and as a coach. He is also a 2006 inductee into the College Basketball Hall of Fame.

Wilkens made a combined 13 NBA All-Star Game appearances as a player (nine times) and as a head coach (four times), was the 1994 NBA Coach of the Year, won the 1979 NBA championship as the head coach of the Seattle SuperSonics, and was the head coach of the Olympic gold medal–winning 1996 U.S. men's basketball team.

During the 1994–95 season, Wilkens set the record for most regular season coaching wins in NBA history, a record he held when he retired with 1,332 victories. As of February 2022, he is in third place on the list, behind Don Nelson and Gregg Popovich. Wilkens won the Chuck Daly Lifetime Achievement Award for the 2010–11 NBA season. Wilkens is also the most prolific coach in NBA history, at 2,487 regular-season games, 89 more games than Nelson, and over 400 more than any other coach, and has more losses than any other coach in NBA history, at 1,155.

== Early life ==
Leonard Randolph Wilkens was born on October 28, 1937, in Brooklyn, New York. Wilkens grew up in the Bedford–Stuyvesant neighborhood of Brooklyn. His father was African-American and his mother was Irish American. Wilkens was raised in the Catholic faith.

At Boys High School, Wilkens was a basketball teammate of longtime Major League Baseball star Tommy Davis, and played for coach Mickey Fisher.

== College career ==
Wilkens was a two-time All-American (1959 and 1960) at Providence College. He led the team to their first NIT appearance in 1959, and to the NIT finals in 1960. When he graduated, Wilkens was, with 1,193 points, the second-ranked scorer in Friar history (he has since dropped to 26th as of 2011). In 1996, Wilkens's No. 14 jersey was retired by the college, the first alumnus to receive such an honor. In honor of his collegiate accomplishments, Wilkens was one of the inaugural inductees into the College Basketball Hall of Fame in 2006.

== Professional playing career ==
=== St. Louis Hawks (1960–1968) ===
Wilkens was drafted sixth overall by the St. Louis Hawks in the 1960 NBA draft. He began his career with eight seasons with the St. Louis Hawks, who lost the finals to the Boston Celtics in his rookie season. The Hawks made the playoffs consistently with Wilkens but never again reached the finals. Wilkens placed second to Wilt Chamberlain in the 1967–1968 MVP balloting, his last with the Hawks.

=== Seattle SuperSonics (1968–1972) ===
Wilkens was traded to the Seattle SuperSonics for Walt Hazzard and spent four seasons there. He averaged 22.4 points, 6.2 rebounds, and 8.2 assists per game in his first season for the SuperSonics, and was an All-Star in three of his seasons for them. He was named head coach in his second season with the team. Although the SuperSonics did not reach the playoffs while Wilkens simultaneously coached and started at point guard, their record improved each season and they won 47 games during the 1971–72 NBA season. Wilkens was dealt to the Cleveland Cavaliers before the start of the next season in a highly unpopular trade, and the SuperSonics fell to 26–56 without his leadership on the court.

=== Cleveland Cavaliers (1972–1974) ===
Wilkens played two seasons with the Cleveland Cavaliers from 1972 to 1974 and was named an All-Star in 1973, the final selection of his playing career. He averaged 20.5 point per game that season, the last of three seasons in which he averaged over 20+ points per game.

=== Portland Trail Blazers (1974–1975) ===
Wilkens played one season with the Portland Trail Blazers, his final season playing, when he averaged career lows in points (6.5), rebounds (1.8), shots (4.7) and minutes per game (17.9).

=== Legacy ===
Wilkens scored 17,772 points during the regular season, was a nine-time NBA All-Star, and was named the 1971 NBA All-Star Game MVP in 1971. With Seattle, he led the league in assists in the 1969–70 season, and at the time of his retirement was the NBA's second all-time leader in that category, behind only Oscar Robertson. In 2021, to commemorate the NBA's 75th Anniversary The Athletic ranked their top 75 players of all time, and named Wilkens as the 75th greatest player in NBA history.

== Coaching career ==
=== Seattle SuperSonics (1969–1972) ===
Wilkens became a player-coach in the closing stages of his playing career, serving both roles for the Seattle SuperSonics from 1969 to 1972. Al Bianchi had resigned as their head coach in the middle of the 1969 offseason when general manager Dick Vertlieb presented the idea to Wilkens. "I told him he was crazy", said Wilkens. “And he said 'Well, you run the show anyway'. He became the second Black coach in NBA history, joining Bill Russell, who had also been a player-coach.

=== Portland Trail Blazers (1974–1976) ===
In his one season as a player with the Portland Trail Blazers, Wilkens was a player-coach. He had been considering retiring from playing when Trail Blazers owner Herman Sarkowsky convinced him to coach the team. To Wilkens's surprise, Portland also acquired his playing rights from Cleveland. He retired from playing in 1975 and was the full-time coach of the Trail Blazers for one more season.

=== Seattle SuperSonics (1977–1985) ===
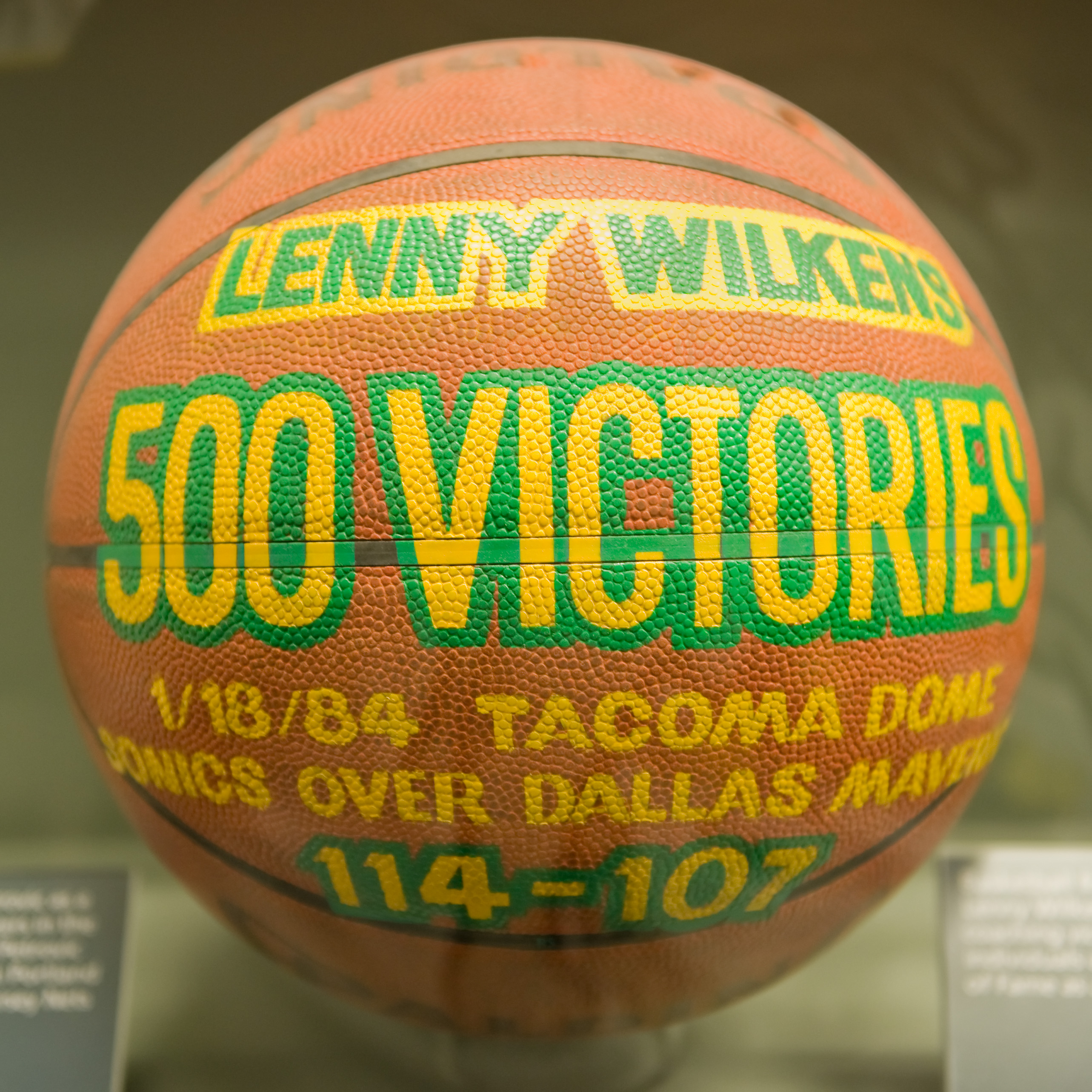
Basketball commemorating Wilkens's 500th career coaching victory

After a season off from coaching, he again became coach of the SuperSonics when he replaced Bob Hopkins who was fired 22 games into the 1977–78 season after a dismal 5–17 start. The SuperSonics won 11 of their first 12 games under Wilkens. They made the playoffs in back-to-back years, losing in seven games to the Washington Bullets in the 1978 NBA Finals before returning to the 1979 NBA Finals and defeating the Washington Bullets in five games for their only NBA title.

He coached in Seattle for eight seasons (1977–1985), winning his (and Seattle's) only NBA championship in 1979.

=== Cleveland Cavaliers (1986–1993) ===
Wilkens coached the Cleveland Cavaliers from 1986 to 1993. His tenure with Cleveland was highlighted by three 50-win seasons, including a then-franchise record 57 victories in both the 1988–89 and 1991–92 seasons. In the second of those seasons, the Cavaliers reached the Eastern Conference Finals for only the second time in franchise history. Cleveland qualified for the playoffs in five of Wilkens's seven seasons. Despite those successes, the Cavaliers failed to make deeper playoff runs under Wilkens, with four of their playoff defeats coming against the Michael Jordan–led Chicago Bulls. In 1993, following their defeat to the Bulls in the second round of the playoffs, Wilkens resigned as coach. His 316 career wins with the Cavaliers are a franchise record.

=== Atlanta Hawks (1993–2000) ===
On June 2, 1993, Wilkens was hired as the head coach of the Atlanta Hawks. In Wilkens's first season, the Hawks tied a then-franchise record with 57 wins, earning the top seed in the Eastern Conference. However, the Hawks traded their superstar Dominique Wilkins midway through the season for Danny Manning, leading to a second-round defeat to the Indiana Pacers. On January 6, 1995, Wilkens won his 939th career regular season game to surpass Red Auerbach as the all-time winningest coach in NBA history, a record he would hold for nearly 15 seasons. In 1997, his contract was extended to two years and $10.4 million dollars. The Hawks never advanced past the second round during the Wilkens era despite six consecutive playoff berths and three 50-win seasons. On April 24, 2000, he resigned as head coach following a 28–54 record.

=== Toronto Raptors (2000–2003) ===
In June 2000, Wilkens signed a four-year, $20 million dollar contract to become head coach of the Toronto Raptors, replacing Butch Carter. In his first season at the helm, he led the Raptors franchise to their first playoff series win, defeating the New York Knicks in the first round. Wilkens and the team parted ways after a disappointing and injury riddled 2002–03 season where they finished with a 24–58 record.

=== New York Knicks (2004–2005) ===
The Hall of Famer was named head coach of the New York Knicks on January 15, 2004, after the team started 15–24 under Don Chaney. After the Knicks' slow start to the 2004–05 season, Wilkens resigned from the team on January 22, 2005.

== Executive career ==
After Seattle finished 31–51 in 1984–85, team owner Barry Ackerley fired Wilkens as coach and moved him to general manager. During his stint as GM, he drafted future All-Star Xavier McDaniel, and hired head coach Bernie Bickerstaff. Wilkens left Seattle in 1986 to become Cleveland's head coach.

On November 29, 2006, Wilkens was hired as vice chairman of the SuperSonics' ownership group, and was later named the Sonics' President of Basketball Operations on April 27, 2007. On July 6, 2007, Wilkens resigned from the Sonics organization. "I feel that my position within the organization did not develop the way that I thought it would", he said.

== Broadcasting career ==
Wilkens briefly worked at Fox Sports Northwest's studio as a college basketball analyst.

== Personal life and death ==
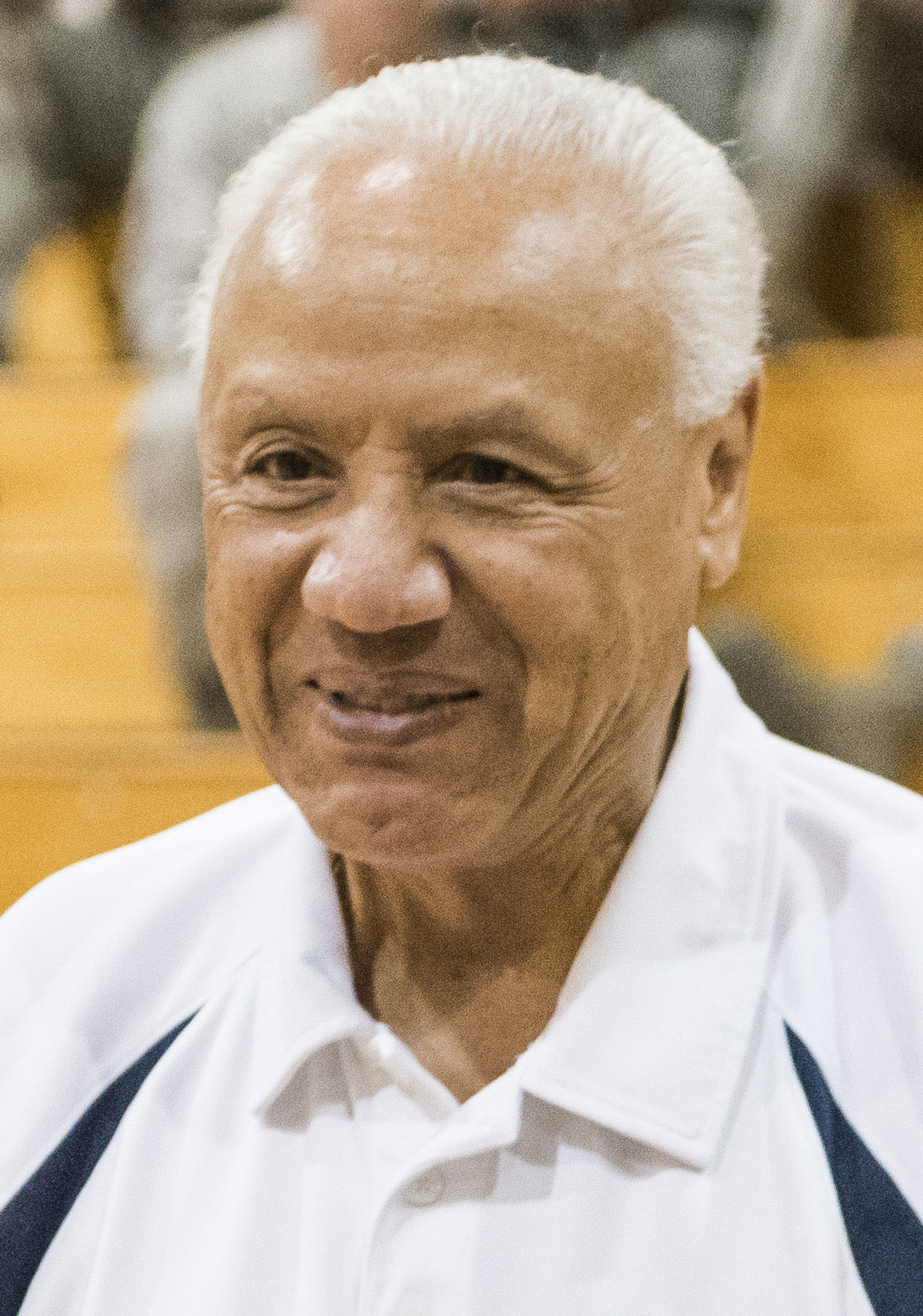
Wilkens in 2013

Wilkens was married to Marilyn Reed from 1962 until his death in 2025; they had three children, Leesha, Randy and Jamee. The Wilkens had seven grandchildren, six girls and one boy.

Wilkens was the founder of the Lenny Wilkens Foundation for Children and lived in Medina, Washington. He was a practicing Catholic. Wilkens died at his home on November 9, 2025, at the age of 88.

== Awards and honors ==
NBA

- 1979 NBA champion (as head coach of Seattle)
- 13-time NBA All-Star
  - nine times as a player
  - four times as a head coach
- 1971 NBA All-Star Game MVP
- 1994 NBA Coach of the Year
- 2011 Chuck Daly Lifetime Achievement Award
- No. 19 retired by Seattle SuperSonics (carried over to the Oklahoma City Thunder)
- Top 10 Coaches in NBA History (NBA 50th Anniversary)
- Top 15 Coaches in NBA History (NBA 75th Anniversary)

USA Basketball

- Two-time coach of Olympic gold medal winning team:
  - 1992 as an assistant coach with the "Dream Team"
  - 1996 as head coach of the U.S. men's team

Halls of Fame

- Three-time Naismith Memorial Basketball Hall of Fame inductee
  - class of 1989 as a player
  - class of 1998 as a coach
  - class of 2010 as a member of the "Dream Team"
- Cleveland Cavaliers Wall of Honor (class of 2022)
- U.S. Olympic Hall of Fame (class of 2009 – as a member of the "Dream Team")
- FIBA Hall of Fame (class of 2017 – as a member of the "Dream Team")
- College Basketball Hall of Fame (class of 2006)
- Providence College Hall of Fame (1972)

State/Local

- City of Seattle renamed Thomas Street to Lenny Wilkens Way.
- A statue outside Climate Pledge Arena was installed on Lenny Wilkens Way in 2025.

Organizational

- 1999 Golden Plate Award of the American Academy of Achievement

== NBA career statistics ==
Legend
GP	Games played	GS	Games started	MPG	Minutes per game
FG%	Field goal percentage	3P%	3-point field goal percentage	FT%	Free throw percentage
RPG	Rebounds per game	APG	Assists per game	SPG	Steals per game
BPG	Blocks per game	PPG	Points per game	**Bold**	Career high
*	Led the league

=== Regular season ===
Year	Team	GP	GS	MPG	FG%	3P%	FT%	RPG	APG	SPG	BPG	PPG
1960–61	St. Louis	74	—	25.3	.425	—	.713	4.5	2.8	—	—	11.7
1961–62	St. Louis	20	—	**43.5**	.385	—	.764	**6.6**	5.8	—	—	18.2
1962–63	St. Louis	75	—	34.3	.399	—	.696	5.4	5.1	—	—	11.8
1963–64	St. Louis	78	—	32.4	.413	—	.740	4.3	4.6	—	—	12.0
1964–65	St. Louis	78	—	36.6	.414	—	.746	4.7	5.5	—	—	16.5
1965–66	St. Louis	69	—	39.0	.431	—	.793	4.7	6.2	—	—	18.0
1966–67	St. Louis	78	—	38.1	.432	—	.787	5.3	5.7	—	—	17.4
1967–68	St. Louis	**82**	—	38.6	.438	—	.768	5.3	8.3	—	—	20.0
1968–69	Seattle	**82**	—	42.2	.440	—	.770	6.2	8.2	—	—	**22.4**
1969–70	Seattle	75	—	37.4	.420	—	.788	5.0	9.1*	—	—	17.8
1970–71	Seattle	71	—	37.2	.419	—	.803	4.5	9.2	—	—	19.8
1971–72	Seattle	80	—	37.4	**.466**	—	.774	4.2	**9.6**	—	—	18.0
1972–73	Cleveland	75	—	39.6	.449	—	**.828**	4.6	8.4	—	—	20.5
1973–74	Cleveland	74	—	33.6	.465	—	.801	3.7	7.1	**1.3**	**0.2**	16.4
1974–75	Portland	65	—	17.9	.439	—	.768	1.8	3.6	1.2	0.1	6.5
Career		1,077	—	35.3	.432	—	.774	4.7	6.7	1.3	0.2	16.5
All-Star		9	3	20.2	.400	—	.781	2.4	2.9	—	—	9.4

=== Playoffs ===
Year	Team	GP	GS	MPG	FG%	3P%	FT%	RPG	APG	SPG	BPG	PPG
1961	St. Louis	**12**	—	36.4	.380	—	.759	6.0	3.5	—	—	14.2
1963	St. Louis	11	—	36.4	.370	—	.755	6.3	6.3	—	—	13.7
1964	St. Louis	**12**	—	34.4	**.448**	—	.759	5.0	5.3	—	—	14.3
1965	St. Louis	4	—	36.8	.351	—	.828	3.0	3.8	—	—	16.0
1966	St. Louis	10	—	39.1	.399	—	.687	5.4	7.0	—	—	17.1
1967	St. Louis	9	—	**42.0**	.400	—	**.856**	**7.6**	7.2	—	—	**21.4**
1968	St. Louis	6	—	39.5	**.440**	—	.750	6.3	**7.8**	—	—	16.1
Career		64	—	37.5	.399	—	.769	5.8	5.8	—	—	16.1

== Head coaching record ==
*	Record

Legend
Regular season	G	Games coached	W	Games won	L	Games lost	W–L %	Win–loss %
Playoffs	PG	Playoff games	PW	Playoff wins	PL	Playoff losses	PW–L %	Playoff win–loss %

Team	Year	G	W	L	W–L%	Finish	PG	PW	PL	PW–L%	Result
Seattle	1969–70	82	36	46	.439	5th in Western	—	—	—	—	Missed playoffs
Seattle	1970–71	82	38	44	.463	4th in Pacific	—	—	—	—	Missed playoffs
Seattle	1971–72	82	47	35	.573	3rd in Pacific	—	—	—	—	Missed playoffs
Portland	1974–75	82	38	44	.463	3rd in Pacific	—	—	—	—	Missed playoffs
Portland	1975–76	82	37	45	.451	5th in Pacific	—	—	—	—	Missed playoffs
Seattle	1977–78	60	42	18	.700	3rd in Pacific	22	13	9	.591	Lost in NBA Finals
Seattle	1978–79	82	52	30	.634	1st in Pacific	17	12	5	.706	Won NBA Championship
Seattle	1979–80	82	56	26	.683	2nd in Pacific	15	7	8	.467	Lost in Conf. Finals
Seattle	1980–81	82	34	48	.415	6th in Pacific	—	—	—	—	Missed playoffs
Seattle	1981–82	82	52	30	.634	2nd in Pacific	8	3	5	.375	Lost in Conf. Semifinals
Seattle	1982–83	82	48	34	.585	3rd in Pacific	2	0	2	.000	Lost in First Round
Seattle	1983–84	82	42	40	.512	3rd in Pacific	5	2	3	.400	Lost in First Round
Seattle	1984–85	82	31	51	.378	5th in Pacific	—	—	—	—	Missed playoffs
Cleveland	1986–87	82	31	51	.378	4th in Central	—	—	—	—	Missed playoffs
Cleveland	1987–88	82	42	40	.512	4th in Central	5	2	3	.400	Lost in First Round
Cleveland	1988–89	82	57	25	.695	2nd in Central	5	2	3	.400	Lost in First Round
Cleveland	1989–90	82	42	40	.512	4th in Central	5	2	3	.400	Lost in First Round
Cleveland	1990–91	82	33	49	.402	6th in Central	—	—	—	—	Missed playoffs
Cleveland	1991–92	82	57	25	.695	2nd in Central	17	9	8	.529	Lost in Conf. Finals
Cleveland	1992–93	82	54	28	.659	2nd in Central	9	3	6	.333	Lost in Conf. Semifinals
Atlanta	1993–94	82	57	25	.695	1st in Central	11	5	6	.455	Lost in Conf. Semifinals
Atlanta	1994–95	82	42	40	.512	5th in Central	3	0	3	.000	Lost in First Round
Atlanta	1995–96	82	46	36	.561	4th in Central	10	4	6	.400	Lost in Conf. Semifinals
Atlanta	1996–97	82	56	26	.683	2nd in Central	10	4	6	.400	Lost in Conf. Semifinals
Atlanta	1997–98	82	50	32	.610	4th in Central	4	1	3	.250	Lost in First Round
Atlanta	1998–99	50	31	19	.620	2nd in Central	9	3	6	.333	Lost in Conf. Semifinals
Atlanta	1999–2000	82	28	54	.341	7th in Central	—	—	—	—	Missed playoffs
Toronto	2000–01	82	47	35	.573	2nd in Central	12	6	6	.500	Lost in Conf. Semifinals
Toronto	2001–02	82	42	40	.512	3rd in Central	5	2	3	.400	Lost in First Round
Toronto	2002–03	82	24	58	.293	7th in Central	—	—	—	—	Missed playoffs
New York	2003–04	42	23	19	.548	3rd in Atlantic	4	0	4	.000	Lost in First Round
New York	2004–05	39	17	22	.436	(resigned)	—	—	—	—	—
Career		2,487*	1,332	1,155	.536		178	80	98	.449	

== Publications ==
- Wilkens, Lenny (1974). The Lenny Wilkens Story. P. S. Eriksson. ISBN 9780839750321.
- Wilkens, Lenny; Pluto, Terry (2000). Unguarded: My Forty Years Surviving in the NBA. Simon & Schuster. ISBN 9780684873749.

== See also ==
- List of NBA career assists leaders
- List of NBA career personal fouls leaders
- List of NBA career free throw scoring leaders
- List of NBA career playoff triple-double leaders
