= List of 2008–09 NBA season transactions =

The following is a list of all team-to-team transactions that have occurred in the National Basketball Association during the 2008–09 NBA season. It lists what team each player has been traded to, signed by, or claimed by, and for which players or draft picks, if applicable.

== Retirement ==
Date	Name	Team(s) played (years)	Age	Notes	Ref.
September 11	Pat Garrity	Phoenix Suns (1998–1999); Orlando Magic (1999–2008)	32		
September 22	Shareef Abdur-Rahim	Vancouver Grizzlies (1996–2001); Atlanta Hawks (2001–2004); Portland Trail Blazers (2004–2005); Sacramento Kings (2005–2008)	32	Was hired as an assistant coach for the Kings.	
September 26	Jason Williams	Sacramento Kings (1998–2001); Memphis Grizzlies (2001–2005); Miami Heat (2005–2008)	31	Retired due to injuries.	
October 27	Adrian Griffin	Boston Celtics (1999–2001); Dallas Mavericks (2001–2003, 2005–2006); Houston Rockets (2003–2004); Chicago Bulls (2004–2005, 2006–2008); Seattle SuperSonics (2008)	34	Was hired by the Bucks as an assistant coach.	
November 1	Michael Doleac	Orlando Magic (1998–2001); Cleveland Cavaliers (2001–2002); New York Knicks (2002–2004); Denver Nuggets (2004); Miami Heat (2004–2007); Minnesota Timberwolves (2007–2008)	31		
December 4	Damon Stoudamire	Toronto Raptors (1995–1998); Portland Trail Blazers (1998–2004); Memphis Grizzlies (2005–2008); San Antonio Spurs (2008)	35	Hired by Rice as player development	
December 10	Cuttino Mobley	Houston Rockets (1998–2004); Orlando Magic (2004–2005); Sacramento Kings (2005); Los Angeles Clippers (2005–2008)	33	Unofficially retired due to health problems, however, he remained in New York's roster.	
January 22	Alonzo Mourning	Charlotte Hornets (1992–1995); Miami Heat (1995–2002, 2005–2008); New Jersey Nets (2003–2004)	39	Second retirement.	
January 26	Darrell Armstrong	Orlando Magic (1995–2003); New Orleans Hornets (2003–2004); Dallas Mavericks (2004–2006); Indiana Pacers (2006–2007); New Jersey Nets (2007–2008)	40	Was hired as an assistant for the Mavericks.	
April 5	Eric Snow	Seattle SuperSonics (1995–1998); Philadelphia 76ers (1998–2004); Cleveland Cavaliers (2004–2008)	35	Unofficially retired in the off-season due to knee injury, however, he remained in Cleveland's roster until he was released on April 5, 2009.	
April 23	Dikembe Mutombo	Denver Nuggets (1991–1996); Atlanta Hawks (1996–2001); Philadelphia 76ers (2001–2002); New Jersey Nets (2002–2003); New York Knicks (2003–2004); Houston Rockets (2004–2009)	42		
May 5	Wayne Simien	Miami Heat (2005–2007)	26		
May 21	Sam Cassell	Houston Rockets (1993–1996); Phoenix Suns (1996); Dallas Mavericks (1996–1997); New Jersey Nets (1997–1999); Milwaukee Bucks (1999–2003); Minnesota Timberwolves (2003–2005); Los Angeles Clippers (2005–2008); Boston Celtics (2008)	40	Was hired as an assistant for the Wizards.	

== Front office movements ==
=== Coaching changes ===
==== Off-season ====
Date	Team	Outgoing coach	New coach	Previous position	Ref.
April 21, 2008	Milwaukee Bucks	Larry Krystkowiak	Scott Skiles	Head coach of the Chicago Bulls (2003–2007)	
April 28, 2008	Miami Heat	Pat Riley	Erik Spoelstra	Assistant coach / Director of Scouting of the Miami Heat (2001–2008)	
April 29, 2008	Charlotte Bobcats	Sam Vincent	Larry Brown	Head coach of the New York Knicks (2005–2006)	
May 13, 2008	New York Knicks	Isiah Thomas	Mike D'Antoni	Head coach of the Phoenix Suns (2003–2008)	
May 14, 2008	Dallas Mavericks	Avery Johnson	Rick Carlisle	Head coach of the Indiana Pacers (2003–2007)	
June 9, 2008	Phoenix Suns	Mike D'Antoni	Terry Porter	Assistant coach of the Detroit Pistons (2006–2008)	
June 10, 2008	Detroit Pistons	Flip Saunders	Michael Curry	Assistant coach of the Detroit Pistons (2007–2008)	
June 11, 2008	Chicago Bulls	Jim Boylan (interim)	Vinny Del Negro	Assistant general manager of the Phoenix Suns (2007–2008)	

==== In-season ====
Date	Team	Outgoing coach	New coach	Previous position	Ref.
November 22, 2008	Oklahoma City Thunder	P. J. Carlesimo	Scott Brooks (interim)	Assistant coach of the Oklahoma City Thunder (2007–2008)	
November 24, 2008	Washington Wizards	Eddie Jordan	Ed Tapscott (interim)	Director of Player Development of the Washington Wizards (2007–2008)	
December 3, 2008	Toronto Raptors	Sam Mitchell	Jay Triano (interim)	Assistant coach of the Toronto Raptors (2002–2008)	
December 8, 2008	Minnesota Timberwolves	Randy Wittman	Kevin McHale (interim)	Vice president of basketball operations of the Minnesota Timberwolves (1995–2008)	
December 13, 2008	Philadelphia 76ers	Maurice Cheeks	Tony DiLeo (interim)	Senior Vice President / Assistant general manager of the Philadelphia Sixers (2003–2008)	
December 15, 2008	Sacramento Kings	Reggie Theus	Kenny Natt (interim)	Assistant coach of the Sacramento Kings (2007–2008)	
January 23, 2009	Memphis Grizzlies	Marc Iavaroni	Johnny Davis (interim)	Assistant coach of the Memphis Grizzlies (2007–2009)	
January 25, 2009	Memphis Grizzlies	Johnny Davis (interim)	Lionel Hollins	Assistant coach of the Milwaukee Bucks (2008–2009)	
February 16, 2009	Phoenix Suns	Terry Porter	Alvin Gentry (interim)	Assistant coach of the Phoenix Suns (2004–2009)	

== Player movements ==
=== Trades ===
June
June 25	To Charlotte Bobcats: Draft rights to Alexis Ajinça	To Denver Nuggets: Future protected first-round pick
June 26	To Memphis Grizzlies: Greg Buckner; Marko Jarić; Antoine Walker; Draft rights to O. J. Mayo	To Minnesota Timberwolves: Brian Cardinal; Jason Collins; Mike Miller; Draft rights to Kevin Love
June 26	To Detroit Pistons: Draft rights to Trent Plaisted; Walter Sharpe	To Seattle SuperSonics: Draft rights to D. J. White
June 26	To Cleveland Cavaliers: Draft rights to Darnell Jackson	To Miami Heat: Second-round pick in 2009 NBA draft
June 26	To Los Angeles Clippers: Draft rights to Mike Taylor	To Portland Trail Blazers: Second-round pick in 2009 NBA draft
June 26	To Phoenix Suns: Draft rights to Goran Dragić	To San Antonio Spurs: Draft rights to Malik Hairston; Second-round pick in 2009 NBA draft; Cash considerations
June 26	To Boston Celtics: Draft rights to Bill Walker	To Washington Wizards: Cash considerations
June 26	To Miami Heat: Draft rights to Mario Chalmers	To Minnesota Timberwolves: Two future second-round picks; Cash considerations
June 26	To New Orleans Hornets: Cash considerations	To Portland Trail Blazers: Draft rights to Darrell Arthur
June 26	To Milwaukee Bucks: Richard Jefferson	To New Jersey Nets: Yi Jianlian; Bobby Simmons
June 26	To Houston Rockets: Draft rights to Joey Dorsey	To Portland Trail Blazers: Draft rights to Nicolas Batum
June 26	To Houston Rockets (from Memphis Grizzlies): Draft rights to Donté Greene; Second-round pick in 2009 NBA draft	
June 26	To Memphis Grizzlies (from Portland Trail Blazers): Draft rights to Darrell Arthur	
June 26	To Chicago Bulls: Draft rights to Ömer Aşık	To Portland Trail Blazers: Two future second-round picks
June 26	To Denver Nuggets (from Chicago Bulls): Draft rights to Sonny Weems	
June 26	To Portland Trail Blazers (from Denver Nuggets): Second-round pick in 2009 NBA draft	
July
July 9	To Indiana Pacers: Jarrett Jack; Josh McRoberts; Draft rights to Brandon Rush; Cash considerations	To Portland Trail Blazers: Jerryd Bayless; Ike Diogu
July 9	To Indiana Pacers: Maceo Baston; T. J. Ford; Rasho Nesterovič; Draft rights to Roy Hibbert	To Toronto Raptors: Jermaine O'Neal; Draft rights to Nathan Jawai
July 9	To Minnesota Timberwolves: Calvin Booth; Rodney Carney; First-round pick; Cash considerations	To Philadelphia 76ers: Future conditional second-round draft pick
July 9	To Denver Nuggets: Option to exchange 2010 second-round picks	To Los Angeles Clippers: Marcus Camby
July 21	To New Jersey Nets: Keyon Dooling	To Orlando Magic: Cash considerations
July 22	To Golden State Warriors: Marcus Williams	To New Jersey Nets: Future first-round pick
July 23	To Los Angeles Clippers: Jason Hart	To Utah Jazz: Brevin Knight
July 28	To Denver Nuggets: Renaldo Balkman; Cash considerations	To New York Knicks: Taurean Green; Bobby Jones; Second-round pick in the 2010 NBA draft
August
August 6	To Houston Rockets: Option to exchange 2011 second-round picks	To Los Angeles Clippers: Steve Novak
August 11	To Charlotte Bobcats: 2009 second-round pick	To Oklahoma City Thunder: Kyle Weaver
August 13	To Cleveland Cavaliers: Mo Williams	To Milwaukee Bucks: Damon Jones
August 13	To Oklahoma City Thunder: Desmond Mason; Joe Smith	To Milwaukee Bucks: Luke Ridnour; Adrian Griffin
August 14	To Sacramento Kings: Bobby Jackson; Donté Greene	To Houston Rockets: Ron Artest; Sean Singletary; Draft rights to Patrick Ewing Jr.
August 29	To New York Knicks: Patrick Ewing Jr.	To Houston Rockets: Draft rights to Frédéric Weis
November
November 3	To Denver Nuggets: Chauncey Billups; Antonio McDyess; Cheikh Samb	To Detroit Pistons: Allen Iverson
November 21	To New York Knicks: Cuttino Mobley; Tim Thomas	To Los Angeles Clippers: Mardy Collins; Zach Randolph
November 21	To Golden State Warriors: Jamal Crawford	To New York Knicks: Al Harrington
December
December 10	To Charlotte Bobcats: Raja Bell; Boris Diaw; Sean Singletary	To Phoenix Suns: Jason Richardson; Jared Dudley
December 10	To Washington Wizards: Mike James	To New Orleans Hornets: Antonio Daniels
December 10	To Washington Wizards: Javaris Crittenton	To Memphis Grizzlies: Conditional future first-round draft pick
December 24	To Houston Rockets: Conditional 2011 second-round draft pick	To Memphis Grizzlies: Steve Francis; 2009 second-round draft pick; Cash considerations
January
January 5	To Denver Nuggets: Conditional future second-round draft pick; Cash considerations	To Los Angeles Clippers: Cheikh Samb
January 7	To Los Angeles Clippers: Hassan Adams	To Toronto Raptors: Conditional future second-round draft pick
January 7	To Denver Nuggets: Johan Petro; second-round draft pick	To Oklahoma City Thunder: Chucky Atkins; first-round draft pick
January 7	To Memphis Grizzlies: Shaun Livingston; cash considerations	To Miami Heat: Conditional 2012 second-round draft pick
January 16	To Charlotte Bobcats: DeSagana Diop	To Dallas Mavericks: Matt Carroll; Ryan Hollins
February
February 5	To Milwaukee Bucks: Keith Bogans; Cash considerations	To Orlando Magic: Tyronn Lue
February 7	To Charlotte Bobcats: Vladimir Radmanović	To Los Angeles Lakers: Shannon Brown; Adam Morrison
February 14	To Miami Heat: Jamario Moon; Jermaine O'Neal	To Toronto Raptors: Marcus Banks; Shawn Marion
February 16	To Detroit Pistons: 2013 second-round draft pick	To Los Angeles Clippers: Alex Acker; 2011 second-round draft pick
February 17	To Boston Celtics: 2015 second-round draft pick	To Sacramento Kings: Sam Cassell
February 18	To Chicago Bulls: Brad Miller; John Salmons	To Sacramento Kings: Drew Gooden; Andrés Nocioni; Michael Ruffin; Cedric Simmons
February 18	To Los Angeles Lakers: 2013 second-round draft pick	To Memphis Grizzlies: Chris Mihm; Cash considerations
February 18	To Portland Trail Blazers: Michael Ruffin	To Sacramento Kings: Ike Diogu
February 19	To Chicago Bulls: 2009 first-round draft pick	To Oklahoma City Thunder: Thabo Sefolosha
February 19	To Minnesota Timberwolves: Bobby Brown; Shelden Williams	To Sacramento Kings: Calvin Booth; Rashad McCants
February 19	To Houston Rockets: Brian Cook	To Orlando Magic: Rafer Alston
February 19	To Houston Rockets: Kyle Lowry	To Memphis Grizzlies: Adonal Foyle; Mike Wilks; 2009 first-round draft pick
February 19	To Chicago Bulls: Tim Thomas; Jerome James; Anthony Roberson	To New York Knicks: Larry Hughes
February 19	To Oklahoma City Thunder: Malik Rose	To New York Knicks: Chris Wilcox
February 19	To Toronto Raptors: Patrick O'Bryant	To Boston Celtics: 2014 second-round draft pick
February 19	To Sacramento Kings: Will Solomon	To Toronto Raptors: Cash considerations

=== Free agency ===
The following lists players who join or leave other team via free agency. Some dates might be contrast from other sources.

Player	Date signed	New team	Former team
Gerald Green	July 3	Dallas Mavericks	Houston Rockets
Hassan Adams	July 6	Toronto Raptors	Teramo Basket
J. J. Barea	July 9	Dallas Mavericks	
Chris Paul	July 9	New Orleans Hornets	
Elton Brand	July 9	Philadelphia 76ers	Los Angeles Clippers
José Calderón	July 9	Toronto Raptors	
DeSagana Diop	July 9	Dallas Mavericks	New Jersey Nets
Chris Duhon	July 9	New York Knicks	Chicago Bulls
James Jones	July 9	Miami Heat	Portland Trail Blazers
Corey Maggette	July 9	Golden State Warriors	Los Angeles Clippers
Chris Paul	July 9	New Orleans Hornets	
Mickaël Piétrus	July 9	Orlando Magic	Golden State Warriors
Beno Udrih	July 9	Sacramento Kings	
Brent Barry	July 10	Houston Rockets	San Antonio Spurs
Baron Davis	July 10	Los Angeles Clippers	Golden State Warriors
Andrew Bogut	July 11	Milwaukee Bucks	
Roger Mason Jr.	July 11	San Antonio Spurs	Washington Wizards
Keith McLeod	July 11	Dallas Mavericks	Indiana Pacers
James Singleton	July 11	Dallas Mavericks	TAU Cerámica (Spain)
Antoine Wright	July 11	Dallas Mavericks	New Jersey Nets
Anthony Carter	July 12	Denver Nuggets	
Gilbert Arenas	July 13	Washington Wizards	
Anthony Johnson	July 14	Orlando Magic	Sacramento Kings
Jarvis Hayes	July 16	New Jersey Nets	Detroit Pistons
Eduardo Nájera	July 16	New Jersey Nets	Denver Nuggets
Roko Ukić	July 16	Toronto Raptors	Virtus Roma
Malik Allen	July 17	Milwaukee Bucks	Dallas Mavericks
Tyronn Lue	July 17	Milwaukee Bucks	Dallas Mavericks
Craig Smith	July 17	Minnesota Timberwolves	
Dee Brown	July 18	Washington Wizards	Galatasaray Café Crown
Deron Williams	July 18	Utah Jazz	
Tony Allen	July 19	Boston Celtics	
Kurt Thomas	July 21	San Antonio Spurs	
Eddie House	July 22	Boston Celtics	
Matt Barnes	July 22	Phoenix Suns	Golden State Warriors
Hamed Haddadi	August 28	Memphis Grizzlies	Saba Battery Tehran (Iran)

== Going overseas ==
Date	Player	New team	Former team	Ref.
June 19, 2008	(Spain) Juan Carlos Navarro	(Spain) Regal FC Barcelona	Memphis Grizzlies	
July 18, 2008	(Argentina) Carlos Delfino	(Russia) Khimki	Toronto Raptors	
July 20, 2008	(Slovenia) Primož Brezec	(Italy) Lottomatica Roma	Toronto Raptors	
July 21, 2008	(Slovenia) Boštjan Nachbar	(Russia) Dynamo Moscow	New Jersey Nets	
July 25, 2008	(United States) Josh Childress	(Greece) Olympiacos Piraeus	Atlanta Hawks	
July 29, 2008	(Serbia) Nenad Krstić	(Russia) BC Triumph	New Jersey Nets	
August 4, 2008	(Puerto Rico) Carlos Arroyo	(Israel) Maccabi Tel Aviv	Orlando Magic	
August 6, 2008	(United States) Earl Boykins	(Italy) Virtus Bologna	Charlotte Bobcats	
August 15, 2008	(United States) Jannero Pargo	(Russia) Dynamo Moscow	New Orleans Hornets	
August 20, 2008	(United States) Earl Barron	(Italy) Fortitudo Bologna	Miami Heat	
August 21, 2008	(Croatia) Gordan Giriček	(Turkey) Fenerbahçe Ülker	Phoenix Suns	

== Released ==
=== Waived ===
Player	Date waived	Former team	Ref
Aaron McKie	May 5	Memphis Grizzlies	
Jorge Garbajosa	June 18	Toronto Raptors	
Alexander Johnson	June 23	Miami Heat	
Taurean Green	July 29	New York Knicks	
Bobby Jones	July 29	New York Knicks	
James Augustine	July 29	Orlando Magic	
Josh Powell	July 30	Los Angeles Clippers	
JamesOn Curry	July 31	Chicago Bulls	
Bobby Jones	August 15	Miami Heat	
Donyell Marshall	August 20	Oklahoma City Thunder	
Stephane Lasme	September 3	Miami Heat	
Donell Taylor	October 14	Charlotte Bobcats	
Marcus Williams	October 14	Charlotte Bobcats	
Darius Miles	October 20	Boston Celtics	
Dwayne Jones	October 23	Orlando Magic	
Justin Williams	October 23	Charlotte Bobcats	
Blake Ahearn	October 23	Minnesota Timberwolves	
David Harrison	October 23	Minnesota Timberwolves	
Chris Richard	October 23	Minnesota Timberwolves	
Jermareo Davidson	October 27	Charlotte Bobcats	
Jason Hart	February 27	Los Angeles Clippers	
Luther Head	February 28	Houston Rockets	
Drew Gooden	March 1	Sacramento Kings	
Adonal Foyle	March 1	Memphis Grizzlies	
Joe Smith	March 1	Oklahoma City Thunder	
Stromile Swift	March 1	New Jersey Nets	
Marcus Williams	March 10	Golden State Warriors	
Eric Snow	April 5	Cleveland Cavaliers	
Malik Hairston	April 8	San Antonio Spurs	
Will Solomon	April 8	Sacramento Kings	

=== Going overseas ===
Date	Player	New team	Former team	Ref.
	(Spain) Jorge Garbajosa	(Russia) Khimki	Toronto Raptors	
	(United States) Taurean Green	(Spain) CAI Zaragoza	Denver Nuggets	
	(United States) Casey Jacobsen	(Germany) ALBA Berlin	Memphis Grizzlies	
	(United States) Alexander Johnson	(Germany) Brose Baskets	Miami Heat	
September 17, 2008	(Serbia) Kosta Perović	(Spain) Valencia	Golden State Warriors	
September 22, 2008	(Gabon) Stephane Lasme	(Serbia) KK Partizan	Miami Heat	

=== Draft picks ===
==== Signed ====
Date	Round	Pick	Player	Team	School/Club Team	Notes	Ref.
July 1, 2008	1	1	Derrick Rose	Chicago Bulls	Memphis (Fr.)		
July 1, 2008	1	2	Michael Beasley	Miami Heat	Kansas State (Fr.)		
July 8, 2008	1	3	O. J. Mayo	Memphis Grizzlies	USC (Fr.)	Drafted by Minnesota Timberwolves	
July 4, 2008	1	4	Russell Westbrook	Oklahoma City Thunder	UCLA (So.)		
July 11, 2008	1	5	Kevin Love	Minnesota Timberwolves	UCLA (Fr.)	Drafted by Memphis Grizzlies	
July 8, 2008	1	6	Danilo Gallinari	New York Knicks	Olimpia Milano (Italy)		
July 2, 2008	1	7	Eric Gordon	Los Angeles Clippers	Indiana (Fr.)		
July 8, 2008	1	8	Joe Alexander	Milwaukee Bucks	West Virginia (Jr.)		
July 8, 2008	1	9	D. J. Augustin	Charlotte Bobcats	Texas (So.)		
July 2, 2008	1	10	Brook Lopez	New Jersey Nets	Stanford (So.)		
July 9, 2008	1	11	Jerryd Bayless	Portland Trail Blazers	Arizona (Fr.)	Drafted by Indiana Pacers	
July 8, 2008	1	12	Jason Thompson	Sacramento Kings	Rider (Sr.)		
July 15, 2008	1	13	Brandon Rush	Indiana Pacers	Kansas (Jr.)	Drafted by Portland Trail Blazers	
July 15, 2008	1	14	Anthony Randolph	Golden State Warriors	LSU (Fr.)		
July 10, 2008	1	15	Robin Lopez	Phoenix Suns	Stanford (So.)		
July 18, 2008	1	16	Marreese Speights	Philadelphia 76ers	Florida (So.)		
July 15, 2008	1	17	Roy Hibbert	Indiana Pacers	Georgetown (Sr.)	Drafted by Toronto Raptors	
July 9, 2008	1	18	JaVale McGee	Washington Wizards	Nevada (So.)		
July 10, 2008	1	19	J. J. Hickson	Cleveland Cavaliers	North Carolina State (Fr.)		
July 8, 2008	1	20	Alexis Ajinça	Charlotte Bobcats	Hyères-Toulon Var Basket (France)		
July 2, 2008	1	21	Ryan Anderson	New Jersey Nets	California (So.)		
July 3, 2008	1	22	Courtney Lee	Orlando Magic	Western Kentucky (Sr.)		
July 10, 2008	1	23	Kosta Koufos	Utah Jazz	Ohio State (Fr.)		
July 22, 2008	1	25	Nicolas Batum	Portland Trail Blazers	Le Mans Sarthe Basket (France)	Drafted by Houston Rockets	
September 24, 2008	1	26	George Hill	San Antonio Spurs	IUPUI (Jr.)		
July 8, 2008	1	27	Darrell Arthur	Memphis Grizzlies	Kansas (So.)	Drafted by New Orleans Hornets	
July 14, 2008	1	28	Donté Greene	Houston Rockets	Syracuse (Fr.)	Drafted by Memphis Grizzlies	
July 4, 2008	1	29	D. J. White	Oklahoma City Thunder	Indiana (Sr.)	Drafted by Detroit Pistons	
August 26, 2008	1	30	J. R. Giddens	Boston Celtics	New Mexico (Sr.)		
August 6, 2008	2	32	Walter Sharpe	Detroit Pistons	UAB (Jr.)	Drafted by Oklahoma City Thunder (as Seattle SuperSonics)	
September 29, 2008	2	33	Joey Dorsey	Houston Rockets	Memphis (Sr.)	Drafted by Portland Trail Blazers	
July 9, 2008	2	34	Mario Chalmers	Miami Heat	Kansas (Jr.)	Drafted by Minnesota Timberwolves	
July 15, 2008	2	35	DeAndre Jordan	Los Angeles Clippers	Texas A&M (Fr.)		
July 9, 2008	2	37	Luc Richard Mbah a Moute	Milwaukee Bucks	UCLA (Jr.)		
August 27, 2008	2	38	Kyle Weaver	Oklahoma City Thunder	Washington State (Sr.)	Drafted by Charlotte Bobcats	
September 15, 2008	2	39	Sonny Weems	Denver Nuggets	Arkansas (Sr.)	Drafted by Chicago Bulls	
July 9, 2008	2	40	Chris Douglas-Roberts	New Jersey Nets	Memphis (Jr.)		
July 11, 2008	2	41	Nathan Jawai	Toronto Raptors	Cairns Taipans (Australia)	Drafted by Indiana Pacers	
July 9, 2008	2	42	Sean Singletary	Sacramento Kings	Virginia (Sr.)		
July 9, 2008	2	43	Patrick Ewing Jr.	Sacramento Kings	Georgetown (Sr.)		
September 22, 2008	2	45	Goran Dragić	Phoenix Suns	KK Union Olimpija (Slovenia)	Drafted by San Antonio Spurs	
August 22, 2008	2	47	Bill Walker	Boston Celtics	Kansas State (Fr.)	Drafted by Washington Wizards	
September 30, 2008	2	48	Malik Hairston	San Antonio Spurs	Oregon (Sr.)	Drafted by Phoenix Suns	
July 24, 2008	2	49	Richard Hendrix	Golden State Warriors	Alabama (Jr.)		
September 6, 2008	2	52	Darnell Jackson	Cleveland Cavaliers	Kansas (Sr.)	Drafted by Miami Heat	
July 15, 2008	2	55	Mike Taylor	Los Angeles Clippers	Idaho Stampede (D-League)	Drafted by Portland Trail Blazers	
August 27, 2008	2	58	Joe Crawford	Los Angeles Lakers	Kentucky (Sr.)		

==== From previous seasons ====
Date	Round	Pick	Player	Team	School/Club Team	Notes	Ref.
July 1, 2008	1	24	Rudy Fernández	Portland Trail Blazers	Joventut Badalona (Spain)	Drafted in 2007 by Phoenix Suns	
August 25, 2008	2	40	Sun Yue	Los Angeles Lakers	Beijing Olympians (ABA)	Drafted in 2007	
July 16, 2008	2	41	Roko Ukić	Toronto Raptors	KK Split (Croatia)	Drafted in 2005	
July 9, 2008	2	49	Marc Gasol	Memphis Grizzlies	CB Girona (Spain)	Drafted in 2007 by the Los Angeles Lakers	

==== Signed undrafted players ====
Date	Player	Team	School/Club Team
August 7	Othello Hunter	Atlanta Hawks	Ohio State (Sr.)
September 8	Rob Kurz	Golden State Warriors	
July 9	DeMarcus Nelson	Golden State Warriors	
July 9	Dion Dowell	Golden State Warriors	
July 24	Anthony Morrow	Golden State Warriors	
September 12	C. J. Giles	Los Angeles Lakers	
July 2	Jason Richards	Miami Heat	
July 2	David Padgett	Miami Heat	
September 25	Maureece Rice	Miami Heat	
August 27	Steven Hill	Portland Trail Blazers	
