= 1989 NBA expansion draft =

Player selection draft

General information
- Sport: Basketball
- Date: June 15, 1989

Overview
- League: NBA
- Expansion teams: Minnesota Timberwolves; Orlando Magic

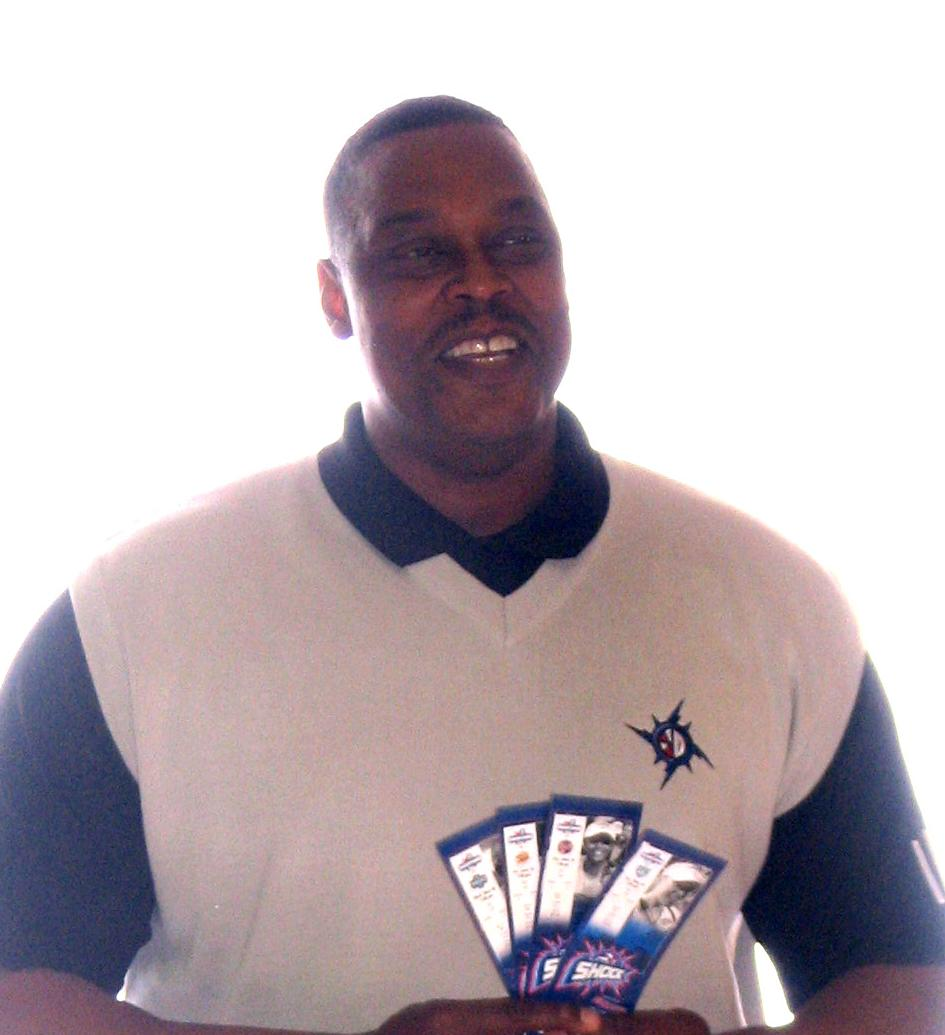
Rick Mahorn was selected by the Minnesota Timberwolves from the Detroit Pistons.

The 1989 NBA expansion draft was the ninth expansion draft of the National Basketball Association (NBA). The draft was held on June 15, 1989, so that the newly founded Minnesota Timberwolves and Orlando Magic could acquire players for the upcoming 1989–90 season. Minnesota and Orlando had been awarded the expansion teams on April 22, 1987. In an NBA expansion draft, new NBA teams are allowed to acquire players from the previously established teams in the league. Not all players on a given team are available during an expansion draft, since each team can protect a certain number of players from being selected. In this draft, each of the twenty-three other NBA teams had protected eight players from their roster and the Magic and the Timberwolves selected twelve and eleven unprotected players respectively, one from each team. The previous year's expansion teams, the Charlotte Hornets and the Miami Heat, were not involved in this draft and did not lose any player. Prior to the draft, the league conducted a coin flip between the Timberwolves and the Magic to decide their draft order in this expansion draft and in the 1989 NBA draft. The Magic won the coin flip and chose to have the first selection and the right to select twelve players in this expansion draft, thus allowing the Timberwolves to receive the higher pick in the 1989 Draft.

The Magic were formed and owned by a group headed by Jim Hewitt and William duPont III. Former Philadelphia 76ers coach Matt Guokas was hired as the franchise's first head coach. The Magic used their first pick to select former fifth overall pick Sidney Green from the New York Knicks. The Magic's other selections included two-time All-Star Reggie Theus and seven former first-round picks, Terry Catledge, Sam Vincent, Scott Skiles, Jerry Reynolds, Jim Farmer, Keith Lee and Frank Johnson. However, Farmer, Lee and Johnson never played for the Magic. Nine players from the expansion draft joined the Magic for their inaugural season, but only two played more than three seasons for the team. Catledge played four seasons with the Magic until his NBA career ended in 1993. Skiles played five seasons with the Magic.

The Timberwolves were formed and owned by a group headed by Marv Wolfenson and Harvey Ratner. The Timberwolves were the second NBA franchise to play in Minnesota, following the Minneapolis Lakers, which moved to Los Angeles and became the Los Angeles Lakers in 1960. Former Cleveland Cavaliers head coach Bill Musselman was hired as the franchise's first head coach. The Timberwolves used their first pick to select Detroit Pistons starting power forward Rick Mahorn. However, Mahorn refused to report to the Timberwolves and was traded to the Philadelphia 76ers prior to the start of the season. The Timberwolves' other selections included one-time All-Star Steve Johnson and two former first-round picks, David Rivers and Maurice Martin. However, Rivers and Martin never played for the Timberwolves. The Timberwolves also selected West German center Gunther Behnke, who had never played in the NBA. Four players from the expansion draft joined the Timberwolves for their inaugural season, but only one played more than one season for the team. Tyrone Corbin played two and a half seasons for the Timberwolves before he was traded in 1991.

== Key ==
Pos.	G	F	C
Position	Guard	Forward	Center

^{+}	Denotes player who has been selected for at least one All-Star Game
^{#}	Denotes player who has never appeared in an NBA regular-season or playoff game

== Selections ==
Pick	Player	Pos.	Nationality	Team	Previous team	NBA years^{[a]}	Career with the franchise^{[b]}	Ref.
1	Sidney Green	F/C	United States	Orlando Magic	New York Knicks	6	1989–1990	
2	Rick Mahorn	F/C	United States	Minnesota Timberwolves	Detroit Pistons	9	—^{[c]}	
3	Reggie Theus^{+}	G	United States	Orlando Magic	Atlanta Hawks	11	1989–1990	
4	Tyrone Corbin	G/F	United States	Minnesota Timberwolves	Phoenix Suns	4	1989–1991	
5	Terry Catledge	F	United States	Orlando Magic	Washington Bullets	4	1989–1993	
6	Steve Johnson^{+}	F/C	United States	Minnesota Timberwolves	Portland Trail Blazers	8	1989–1990	
7	Sam Vincent	G	United States	Orlando Magic	Chicago Bulls	4	1989–1992	
8	Brad Lohaus	F/C	United States	Minnesota Timberwolves	Sacramento Kings	2	1989–1990	
9	Otis Smith	G/F	United States	Orlando Magic	Golden State Warriors	3	1989–1992	
10	David Rivers	G	United States	Minnesota Timberwolves	Los Angeles Lakers	1	—^{[c]}	
11	Scott Skiles	G	United States	Orlando Magic	Indiana Pacers	3	1989–1994	
12	Mark Davis^{[A]}	G/F	United States	Minnesota Timberwolves	Milwaukee Bucks	1	—^{[c]}	
13	Jerry Reynolds	G/F	United States	Orlando Magic	Seattle SuperSonics	4	1989–1992	
14	Scott Roth	F	United States	Minnesota Timberwolves	San Antonio Spurs	2	1989–1990	
15	Mark Acres	F/C	United States	Orlando Magic	Boston Celtics	2	1989–1992	
16	Shelton Jones	F	United States	Minnesota Timberwolves	Philadelphia 76ers	1	—^{[c]}	
17	Morlon Wiley	G	United States	Orlando Magic	Dallas Mavericks	1	1989–1991	
18	Eric White	F	United States	Minnesota Timberwolves	Los Angeles Clippers	2	—^{[c]}	
19	Jim Farmer	G	United States	Orlando Magic	Utah Jazz	2	—^{[c]}	
20	Maurice Martin	G/F	United States	Minnesota Timberwolves	Denver Nuggets	2	—^{[c]}	
21	Keith Lee	F/C	United States	Orlando Magic	New Jersey Nets	3	—^{[c]}	
22	Gunther Behnke^{#}	C	West Germany^{[e]}	Minnesota Timberwolves	Cleveland Cavaliers	0^{[d]}	—^{[c]}	
23	Frank Johnson	G	United States	Orlando Magic	Houston Rockets	8	—^{[c]}	

== Notes ==
- ^{a} Number of years played in the NBA prior to the draft
- ^{b} Career with the expansion franchise that drafted the player
- ^{c} Never played a game for the franchise
- ^{d} Never played in the NBA prior to the expansion draft
- ^{e} Gunther Behnke represented the Germany national team after West and East Germany reunified in 1990.

== Trades ==
Prior to the day of the draft, the following trades were made and resulted in exchanges of future draft picks between the teams, along with a particular agreement in the expansion draft.

- ^{A} The Minnesota Timberwolves agreed to select Mark Davis from the Milwaukee Bucks in exchange for a 1989 second-round pick.
