= 1968 NBA expansion draft =

Player selection draft

General information
- Sport: Basketball
- Date: May 6, 1968

Overview
- League: NBA
- Expansion teams: Milwaukee Bucks; Phoenix Suns

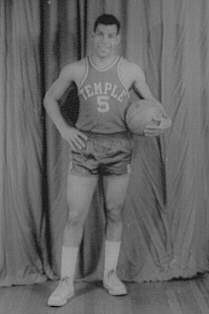
Guy Rodgers was selected by the Milwaukee Bucks from the Cincinnati Royals.

The 1968 NBA expansion draft was the fourth expansion draft of the National Basketball Association (NBA). The draft was held on May 6, 1968, so that the newly founded Milwaukee Bucks and Phoenix Suns could acquire players for the upcoming 1968–69 season. Milwaukee and Phoenix had been awarded the expansion teams on January 22, 1968. In an NBA expansion draft, new NBA teams are allowed to acquire players from the previously established teams in the league. Not all players on a given team are available during an expansion draft, since each team can protect a certain number of players from being selected. In this draft, each of the twelve other NBA teams had protected seven players from their roster. After each round, where each the Suns and the Bucks had selected one player, the existing teams added another player to their protected list. The draft continued until both teams had selected eighteen unprotected players each, while the existing teams had lost three players each.

The Milwaukee Bucks were formed and owned by a group of investors headed by Wesley Pavalon and Marvin Fishman, which called the Milwaukee Professional Sports and Services, Inc. (Milwaukee Pro). The Bucks were the second NBA team from Milwaukee, after the Milwaukee Hawks, which moved to St. Louis in 1955 and then Atlanta in 1968, becoming the Atlanta Hawks. The Bucks' selections included former first overall pick Fred Hetzel, six-time All-Star Larry Costello, five-time All-Star Wayne Embry, four-time All-Star Guy Rodgers and one-time All-Star Len Chappell. Prior to the expansion draft, Costello retired from playing due to injury and was named as the franchise's first head coach. Ten players from the expansion draft joined the Bucks for their inaugural season, but only three played more than one season for the team. Jon McGlocklin, who played eight seasons with the Bucks, was named to the 1969 All-Star Game, becoming the franchise's first All-Star. He was the only player from the expansion draft that was on the Bucks team that won the NBA championship in 1971. Embry was later inducted to the Basketball Hall of Fame as a contributor.

The Phoenix Suns were formed and owned by a group of investors headed by Richard Bloch. Former Chicago Bulls head coach and 1967 Coach of the Year Johnny Kerr was named as the franchise's first head coach. The Suns' selections included former territorial picks Gail Goodrich and George Wilson. Eight players from the expansion draft joined the Suns for their inaugural season, but only five played more than one season for the team. John Wetzel was the ninth player from the expansion draft to play for the Suns. He made his first appearance in 1970 after serving in the military for two years. Goodrich and Dick Van Arsdale were named to the 1969 All-Star Game, becoming the franchise's first All-Stars. Van Arsdale played nine seasons with the Suns and became the Suns' franchise leader in games played when he retired in 1977, a record which has since been broken by Alvan Adams and Walter Davis. Goodrich played two seasons with the Suns and was later inducted to the Naismith Memorial Basketball Hall of Fame as a player.

== Key ==
Pos.	G	F	C
Position	Guard	Forward	Center

^	Denotes player who has been inducted to the Naismith Memorial Basketball Hall of Fame
*	Denotes player who has been selected for at least one All-Star Game and All-NBA Team
^{+}	Denotes player who has been selected for at least one All-Star Game

== Selections ==
Player	Pos.	Nationality	Team	Previous team	Years of NBA experience^{[a]}	Career with the franchise^{[b]}	Ref.
Len Chappell^{+}	F/C	United States	Milwaukee Bucks	Detroit Pistons	6	1968–1970	
Larry Costello*	G	United States	Milwaukee Bucks	Philadelphia 76ers	12	—^{[c]}	
Johnny Egan	G	United States	Milwaukee Bucks	Baltimore Bullets	7	—^{[c]}	
Wayne Embry^{+}	F/C	United States	Milwaukee Bucks	Boston Celtics	10	1968–1969	
Dave Gambee	F	United States	Milwaukee Bucks	San Diego Rockets	10	1968	
Gary Gray	G	United States	Milwaukee Bucks	Cincinnati Royals	1	—^{[c]}	
Fred Hetzel	F/C	United States	Milwaukee Bucks	San Francisco Warriors	3	1968–1969	
Johnny Jones	F	United States	Milwaukee Bucks	Boston Celtics	1	—^{[c]}	
Bob Love*	F	United States	Milwaukee Bucks	Cincinnati Royals	2	1968	
Jon McGlocklin^{+}	G/F	United States	Milwaukee Bucks	San Diego Rockets	3	1968–1976	
Jay Miller	F	United States	Milwaukee Bucks	Atlanta Hawks	1	1968	
Bud Olsen	F/C	United States	Milwaukee Bucks	Seattle SuperSonics	6	—^{[c]}	
George Patterson	F/C	United States	Milwaukee Bucks	Detroit Pistons	1	—^{[c]}	
Jim Reid	F	United States	Milwaukee Bucks	Philadelphia 76ers	1	—^{[c]}	
Guy Rodgers^	G	United States	Milwaukee Bucks	Cincinnati Royals	10	1968–1970	
Tom Thacker	G/F	United States	Milwaukee Bucks	Boston Celtics	4	—^{[c]}	
Bob Warlick	G/F	United States	Milwaukee Bucks	San Francisco Warriors	3	1968	
Bob Weiss	G	United States	Milwaukee Bucks	Seattle SuperSonics	3	1968	
John Barnhill	G	United States	Phoenix Suns	San Diego Rockets	6	—^{[c]}	
Em Bryant	G	United States	Phoenix Suns	New York Knicks	4	—^{[c]}	
Gail Goodrich^	G	United States	Phoenix Suns	Los Angeles Lakers	3	1968–1970	
Dennis Hamilton	F	United States	Phoenix Suns	Los Angeles Lakers	1	—^{[c]}	
Neil Johnson	F/C	United States	Phoenix Suns	New York Knicks	2	1968–1970	
Dave Lattin	F/C	United States	Phoenix Suns	San Francisco Warriors	1	1968–1969	
Paul Long	G	United States	Phoenix Suns	Detroit Pistons	1	—^{[c]}	
Stan McKenzie	G/F	United States	Phoenix Suns	Baltimore Bullets	1	1968–1970	
McCoy McLemore	F/C	United States	Phoenix Suns	Chicago Bulls	4	1968	
Bill Melchionni	G	United States	Phoenix Suns	Philadelphia 76ers	1	—^{[c]}	
Dave Schellhase	G	United States	Phoenix Suns	Chicago Bulls	2	—^{[c]}	
Dick Snyder	G/F	United States	Phoenix Suns	Atlanta Hawks	2	1968–1969	
Craig Spitzer	C	United States	Phoenix Suns	Chicago Bulls	1	—^{[c]}	
Bumper Tormohlen	F/C	United States	Phoenix Suns	Atlanta Hawks	5	—^{[c]}	
Dick Van Arsdale^{+}	G/F	United States	Phoenix Suns	New York Knicks	3	1968–1977	
Roland West	G	United States	Phoenix Suns	Baltimore Bullets	1	—^{[c]}	
John Wetzel	G/F	United States	Phoenix Suns	Los Angeles Lakers	1	1970–1972; 1975–1976	
George Wilson	C	United States	Phoenix Suns	Seattle SuperSonics	4	1968–1969	

== Notes ==
- ^{a} Number of years played in the NBA prior to the draft
- ^{b} Career with the expansion franchise that drafted the player
- ^{c} Never played a game for the franchise
