= Jim Reid (basketball) =

American basketball player

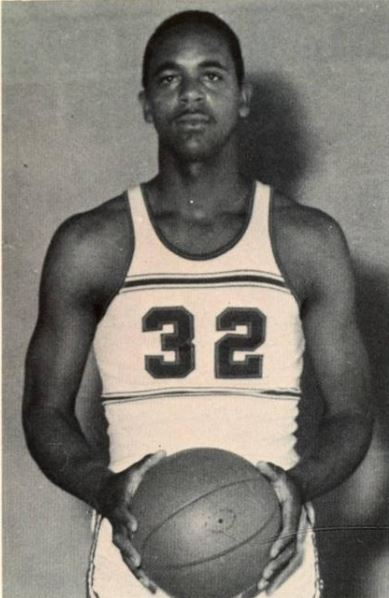
- Reid as a senior at Winston-Salem State.

Personal information
- Born: August 3, 1945 (age 81)
- Listed height: 6 ft 6 in (1.98 m)
- Listed weight: 210 lb (95 kg)

Career information
- College: Winston-Salem State (1965–1967)
- NBA draft: 1967: 5th round, 53rd overall pick
- Drafted by: Philadelphia 76ers
- Playing career: 1967–1974
- Position: Forward
- Number: 12

Career history
- 1967: Philadelphia 76ers
- 1968–1969: Wilkes-Barre Barons
- 1970–1971: Sunbury Mercuries
- 1971–1972: Cherry Hill Demons / Hazleton Hurricanes / Bits
- 1972–1973: Hamburg / Hazleton Bullets
- 1973–1974: East Orange Colonials

Career highlights
- NCAA College Division champion (1967)

Career statistics
- Points: 21
- Rebounds: 11
- Assists: 3
- Stats at NBA.com
- Stats at Basketball Reference

Jim Reid (born August 3, 1945) is an American former basketball player who was a forward in the National Basketball Association. Reid was drafted in the fifth round of the 1967 NBA draft by the Philadelphia 76ers and played that season with the team. He was later selected by the Milwaukee Bucks in the 1968 NBA expansion draft.

Reid played in the Eastern Professional Basketball League (EPBL) / Eastern Basketball Association (EBA) for the Wilkes-Barre Barons, Sunbury Mercuries, Cherry Hill Demons / Hazleton Hurricanes / Bits, Hamburg / Hazleton Bullets and East Orange Colonials from 1968 to 1974.

== Career statistics ==
Legend
GP	Games played	GS	Games started	MPG	Minutes per game
FG%	Field goal percentage	3P%	3-point field goal percentage	FT%	Free throw percentage
RPG	Rebounds per game	APG	Assists per game	SPG	Steals per game
BPG	Blocks per game	PPG	Points per game	**Bold**	Career high

=== NBA ===
==== Regular season ====
Year	Team	GP	MPG	FG%	FT%	RPG	APG	PPG
1967–68	Philadelphia	6	8.7	.500	.200	1.8	.5	3.5
