= Maurice Martin =

American basketball player

Personal information
- Born: July 2, 1964 (age 62) Liberty, New York, U.S.
- Listed height: 6 ft 6 in (1.98 m)
- Listed weight: 200 lb (91 kg)

Career information
- High school: Liberty (Liberty, New York)
- College: Saint Joseph's (1982–1986)
- NBA draft: 1986: 1st round, 16th overall pick
- Drafted by: Denver Nuggets
- Playing career: 1986–1988
- Position: Small forward / shooting guard
- Number: 11

Career history
- 1986–1988: Denver Nuggets
- 1989–1990: Quad City Thunder

Career highlights
- Atlantic 10 Player of the Year (1986); 2× First-team All-Atlantic 10 (1985, 1986); Second-team All-Atlantic 10 (1984); Atlantic 10 All-Rookie Team (1983)
- Stats at NBA.com
- Stats at Basketball Reference
Medals
Men's basketball
Representing United States
Summer Universiade
Silver medal – second place	1985 Kobe	National team

Maurice "Mo" Martin (born July 2, 1964) is an American former professional basketball player. He played at Saint Joseph's University from 1982 to 1986 and was an Associated Press honorable mention All-American in his senior year. The 1986 Atlantic 10 Player of the Year, he was a three-time selection to both the All-Conference team and the All-Big 5 squad. He is one of five Saint Joseph's Hawks to be chosen in the first round of the NBA Draft (drafted by the Denver Nuggets, taken 16th overall) 1986 NBA draft. Martin played two seasons in the NBA, averaging 3.0 points per game in 69 games for the Nuggets. Martin was then selected by the Minnesota Timberwolves in the 1989 NBA expansion draft, but never played for the team, and ended up retiring completely from the NBA at the age of just 24 due to chronic knee pain. He is still the only player from Sullivan County, New York to ever play in the NBA.

Martin attempted a comeback in the 1989–90 season with the Quad City Thunder of the Continental Basketball Association (CBA). His tenure was limited to two games for the Thunder, before his injuries ended his season.

In 1984, he was invited to tryouts for the 1984 United States men's Olympic basketball team, and was one of the last players cut before the roster was finalized.

Following his NBA career, he became a certified electrician and worked for the Pepsi Center for nearly 20 years as a supervisor that would transform the arena's playing surfaces

In 2016, he was diagnosed with Amyloidosis and as of 2020 was seeking a kidney transplant due to Amyloidosis complications.

== Career statistics ==
Legend
GP	Games played	GS	Games started	MPG	Minutes per game
FG%	Field goal percentage	3P%	3-point field goal percentage	FT%	Free throw percentage
RPG	Rebounds per game	APG	Assists per game	SPG	Steals per game
BPG	Blocks per game	PPG	Points per game	**Bold**	Career high

=== NBA ===
==== Regular season ====
Year	Team	GP	GS	MPG	FG%	3P%	FT%	RPG	APG	SPG	BPG	PPG
1986–87	Denver	**43**	0	**6.7**	**.378**	.200	**.636**	**1.0**	**.8**	**.3**	**.1**	**3.4**
1987–88	Denver	26	0	5.2	.377	**.250**	.476	.9	.5	.2	**.1**	2.2
Career		69	0	6.1	.378	.211	.598	.9	.7	.3	.1	3.0

==== Playoffs ====
Year	Team	GP	GS	MPG	FG%	3P%	FT%	RPG	APG	SPG	BPG	PPG
1987	Denver	**3**	0	**18.0**	**.414**	.000	.583	**3.0**	**3.3**	.0	**.3**	**10.3**
1988	Denver	**3**	0	3.0	.200	.000	**.833**	.3	.0	.0	**.3**	2.3
Career		6	0	10.5	.382	.000	.667	1.7	1.7	.0	.3	6.3
