= List of Sacramento Kings head coaches =

The Sacramento Kings are an American professional basketball team based in Sacramento, California. The Kings play in the Pacific Division of the Western Conference in the National Basketball Association (NBA). The team was founded as the Rochester Royals by Lester Harrison and his brother Jack Harrison in Rochester, New York in 1945. The Royals won the National Basketball League (NBL) championship during their inaugural season by defeating the Sheboygan Red Skins 3–0. In 1948, the team joined the Basketball Association of America (BAA), which merged with the NBL to become the NBA a year later. The franchise won its first NBA championship in the 1951 NBA Finals under the coaching of Lester Harrison. The Harrison brothers moved the team to Cincinnati, Ohio in 1957 due to poor attendance. After spending 15 years in Cincinnati, the team was purchased by a group of businessmen from Kansas City, who moved the team to Kansas City and renamed it to the Kings in 1972. The team was briefly named the Kansas City-Omaha Kings from 1972 to 1975 when home games were split between two cities. In 1983, the franchise was bought by a Sacramento-based group, and in 1985, moved to Sacramento, becoming the Sacramento Kings.

There have been 28 head coaches for the franchise since joining the NBA. Rick Adelman is the franchise's all-time leader in regular season games coached (624), regular season games won (395), playoff games coached (69), and playoff games won (34). Phil Johnson, Cotton Fitzsimmons, and Mike Brown have won NBA Coach of the Year with the Kings, in the 1974–75, 1978–79, and 2022–23 seasons respectively. Harrison, Bobby Wanzer, Ed Jucker, Bob Cousy, Draff Young, Jerry Reynolds, Reggie Theus, and Kenny Natt have spent their entire NBA head coaching careers with the Kings. Wanzer, Tom Marshall, Jack McMahon, Cousy, Larry Staverman, Adelman and Theus formerly played for the Kings. The Kings are currently owned by Vivek Ranadivé, with former Knicks General Manager Scott Perry as the general manager and Doug Christie as the head coach.

== Key ==
GC	Games coached
W	Wins
L	Losses
Win%	Winning percentage
#	Number of coaches^{[a]}
*	Spent entire NBA head coaching career with the Kings

== Coaches ==
Note: Statistics are correct through the end of the 2025–26 season. The list does not include NBL seasons.

#	Name	Term^{[b]}	GC	W	L	Win%	GC	W	L	Win%	Achievements	Reference
#	Name	Term^{[b]}	Regular season				Playoffs				Achievements	Reference
1	Les Harrison*	1948–1955	476	296	181	.620	38	19	19	.500	1 Championship (1951)	
2	Bobby Wanzer*	1955–1957 (as player-coach); 1957–1958	234	98	126	.418	2	0	2	.000		
3	Tom Marshall	1958–1959 (as player-coach); 1959–1960	129	35	94	.271	—	—	—	—		
4	Charles Wolf	1960–1963	239	118	121	.494	16	7	9	.438		
5	Jack McMahon	1963–1967	321	187	134	.583	23	8	15	.348		
6	Ed Jucker*	1967–1969	164	80	84	.488	—	—	—	—		
7	Bob Cousy*	1969–1970 (as player-coach); 1970–1973	350	141	209	.403	—	—	—	—		
8	Draff Young*	1973	3	0	3	.000	—	—	—	—		
9	Phil Johnson	1973–1978	340	155	185	.456	6	2	4	.333	1974–75 NBA Coach of the Year	
10	Larry Staverman	1978	45	18	27	.400	—	—	—	—		
11	Cotton Fitzsimmons	1978–1984	492	248	244	.504	26	9	17	.346	1978–79 NBA Coach of the Year	
12	Jack McKinney	1984	9	1	8	.111	—	—	—	—		
—	Phil Johnson	1984–1987	201	81	120	.403	3	0	3	.000		
13	Jerry Reynolds*	1987	60	22	38	.367	—	—	—	—		
14	Bill Russell	1987–1988	58	17	41	.293	—	—	—	—		
—	Jerry Reynolds*	1988–1990	110	34	76	.309	—	—	—	—		
15	Dick Motta	1990–1991	161	48	113	.298	—	—	—	—		
16	Rex Hughes	1991–1992	57	22	35	.386	—	—	—	—		
17	Garry St. Jean	1992–1997	395	159	236	.403	4	1	3	.250		
18	Eddie Jordan	1997–1998	97	33	64	.340	—	—	—	—		
19	Rick Adelman†	1998–2006	624	395	229	.633	69	34	35	.493		
20	Eric Musselman	2006–2007	82	33	49	.402	—	—	—	—		
21	Reggie Theus*	2007–2008	106	44	62	.415	—	—	—	—		
22	Kenny Natt*	2008–2009	58	11	47	.190	—	—	—	—		
23	Paul Westphal	2009–2012	171	51	120	.298	—	—	—	—		
24	Keith Smart	2012–2013	141	48	93	.340	—	—	—	—		
25	Michael Malone	2013–2014	106	39	67	.368	—	—	—	—		
26	Tyrone Corbin	2014–2015	28	7	21	.250	—	—	—	—		
27	George Karl†	2015–2016	112	44	68	.393	—	—	—	—		
28	Dave Joerger	2016–2019	246	98	148	.398	—	—	—	—		
29	Luke Walton	2019–2021	161	68	93	.422	—	—	—	—		
30	Alvin Gentry	2021–2022	65	24	41	.369	—	—	—	—		
31	Mike Brown	2022–2024	195	107	88	.549	7	3	4	.429	2022–23 NBA Coach of the Year	
32	Doug Christie	2024–present	133	49	84	.368	0	0	0	–		

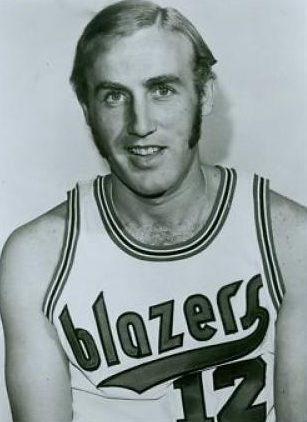
Rick Adelman, Kings head coach from 1998 to 2006

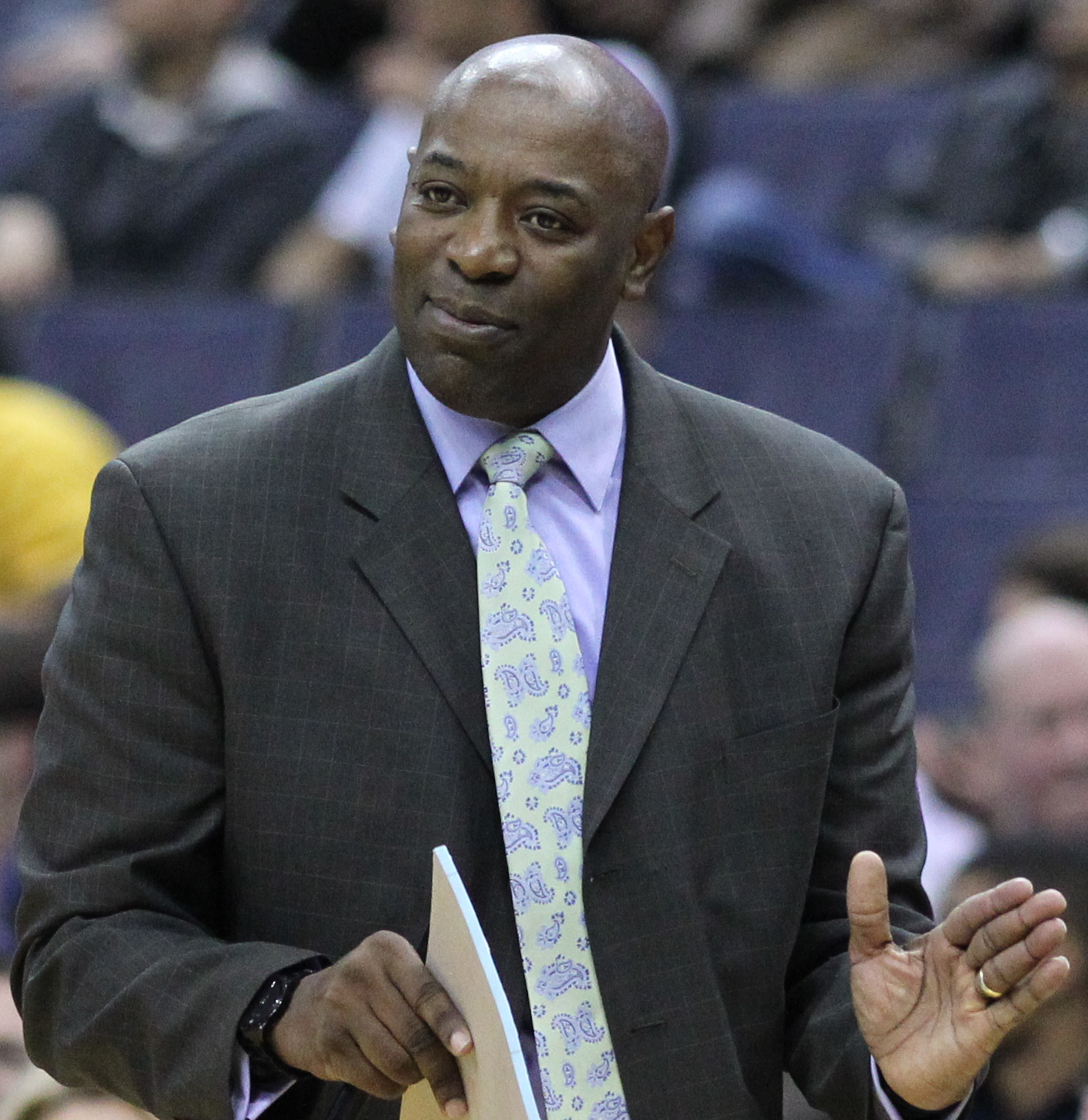
Keith Smart, Kings head coach from 2012 to 2013

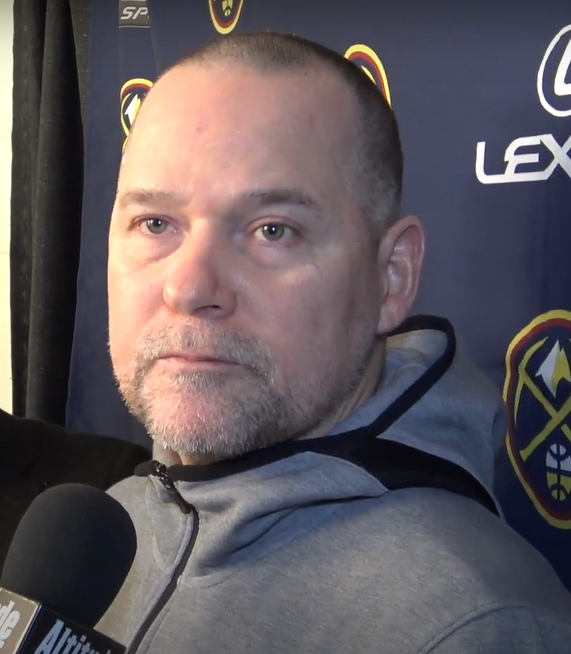
Michael Malone, Kings head coach from 2013 to 2014

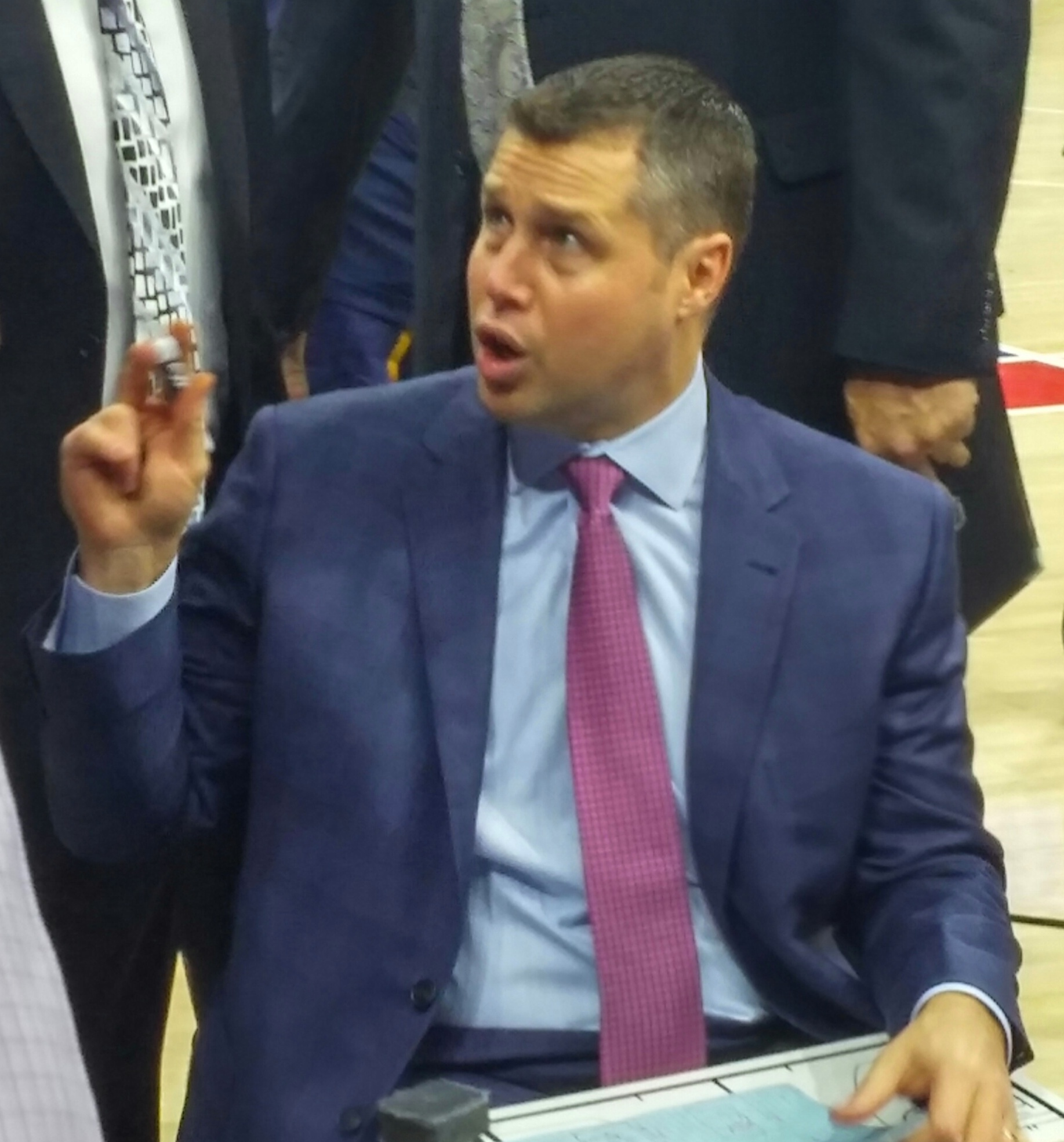
Dave Joerger, Kings head coach from 2016 to 2019

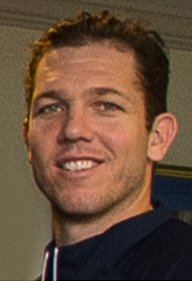
Luke Walton, Kings head coach from 2019 to 2021

== Notes ==
- ^{a} A running total of the number of coaches of the Royals/Kings. Thus, any coach who has two or more separate terms as head coach is only counted once.
- ^{b} Each year is linked to an article about that particular NBA season.
