= List of Memphis Grizzlies head coaches =

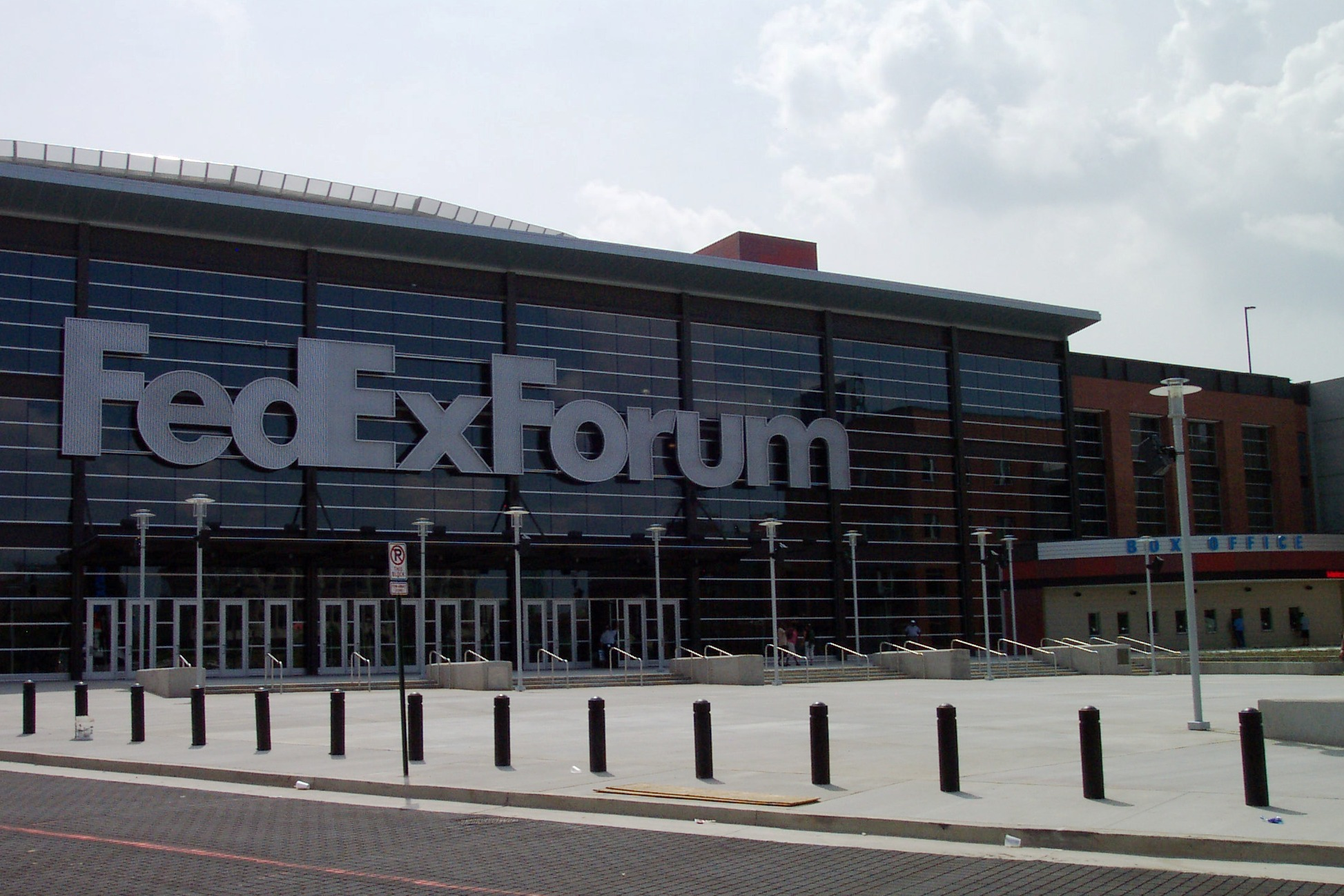
The Grizzlies have played their home games at the FedExForum since 2004.

The Memphis Grizzlies are an American professional basketball team based in Memphis, Tennessee. The Grizzlies play in the Southwest Division of the Western Conference of the National Basketball Association (NBA). The team was founded in Vancouver, British Columbia in 1995 along with the Toronto Raptors as part of the NBA's expansion into Canada. The Grizzlies and the Raptors became the first non-United States teams to join the NBA since 1946. After spending six seasons in Vancouver, the Grizzlies relocated to Memphis in the 2001–02 season. The Grizzlies have played their home games at the FedExForum since 2004. The Grizzlies were owned by Michael Heisley and several locals including J. R. Hyde, Andy Cates, and Elliot Perry.

There have been 11 head coaches for the Grizzlies franchise. The franchise's first head coach was Brian Winters, who coached for two seasons. Lionel Hollins is the franchise's all-time leader in regular-season games coached (415), Taylor Jenkins is the franchise's all-time leader in regular-season game wins (215). Hubie Brown is the only Grizzlies head coach to have won the NBA Coach of the Year Award. Brown was inducted into the Basketball Hall of Fame as a contributor,^{[a]} in 2005. Tony Barone and Marc Iavaroni have spent their entire NBA head coaching careers with the Grizzlies. Iavaroni was fired by the Grizzlies on January 22, 2009. Hollins was named as Iavaroni's successor, though Johnny Davis was the head coach for two games before Hollins' third term with the team. On May 7, 2016, Dave Joerger was fired by the Grizzlies. On May 29, 2016, David Fizdale was hired by the Grizzlies. Fizdale was fired on November 27, 2017.

== Key ==
GC	Games coached
W	Wins
L	Losses
Win%	Winning percentage
#	Number of coaches^{[a]}
*	Spent entire NBA head coaching career with the Grizzlies

== Coaches ==
Note: Statistics are correct through the end of the 2025–26 season.

#	Name	Term^{[b]}	GC	W	L	Win%	GC	W	L	Win%	Achievements	Reference
#	Name	Term^{[b]}	Regular season				Playoffs				Achievements	Reference
Vancouver Grizzlies
1	Brian Winters	1995–1997	125	23	102	.184	0	0	0	–		
2	Stu Jackson	1997	39	6	33	.154	0	0	0	–		
3	Brian Hill	1997–1999	154	31	123	.201	0	0	0	–		
4	Lionel Hollins	1999–2000	60	18	42	.300	0	0	0	–		
5	Sidney Lowe	2000–2001	82	23	59	.280	0	0	0	–		
Memphis Grizzlies
—	Sidney Lowe	2001–2002	90	23	67	.256	0	0	0	–		
6	Hubie Brown	2002–2004	168	83	85	.494	4	0	4	.000	NBA Coach of the Year (2003–04)	
—	Lionel Hollins	2004	4	0	4	.000	0	0	0	–		
7	Mike Fratello	2004–2006	178	95	83	.534	8	0	8	.000		
8	Tony Barone*	2006–2007	52	16	36	.308	0	0	0	–		
9	Marc Iavaroni*	2007–2009	123	33	90	.268	0	0	0	–		
10	Johnny Davis	2009	2	0	2	.000	0	0	0	–		
—	Lionel Hollins	2009–2013	351	196	155	.558	35	18	17	.514		
11	Dave Joerger	2013–2016	246	147	99	.598	22	9	13	.409		
12	David Fizdale	2016–2017	101	50	51	.495	6	2	4	.333		
13	J. B. Bickerstaff	2017–2019	145	48	97	.331	—	—	—	–		
14	Taylor Jenkins	2019–2025	464	250	214	.539	23	9	14	.391		
15	Tuomas Iisalo*	2025–present	90	29	61	.322	4	0	4	.000		

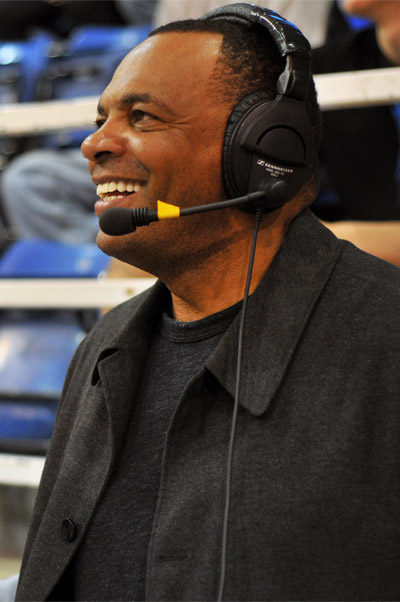
Lionel Hollins was the coach for the Grizzlies in 1999–2000 and 2004, and from 2009 to 2013.

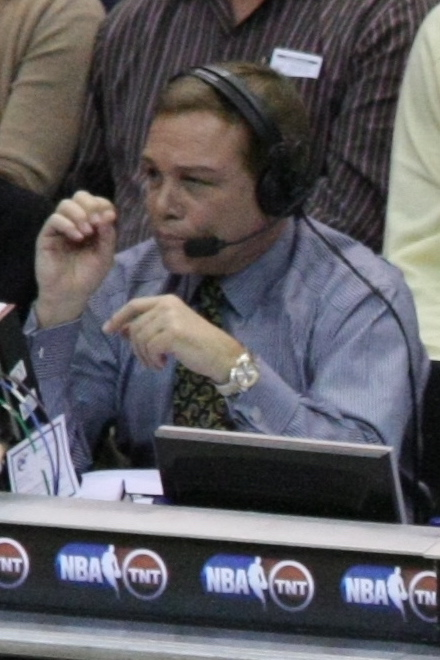
Mike Fratello was the coach for the Grizzlies from 2004 to 2006.

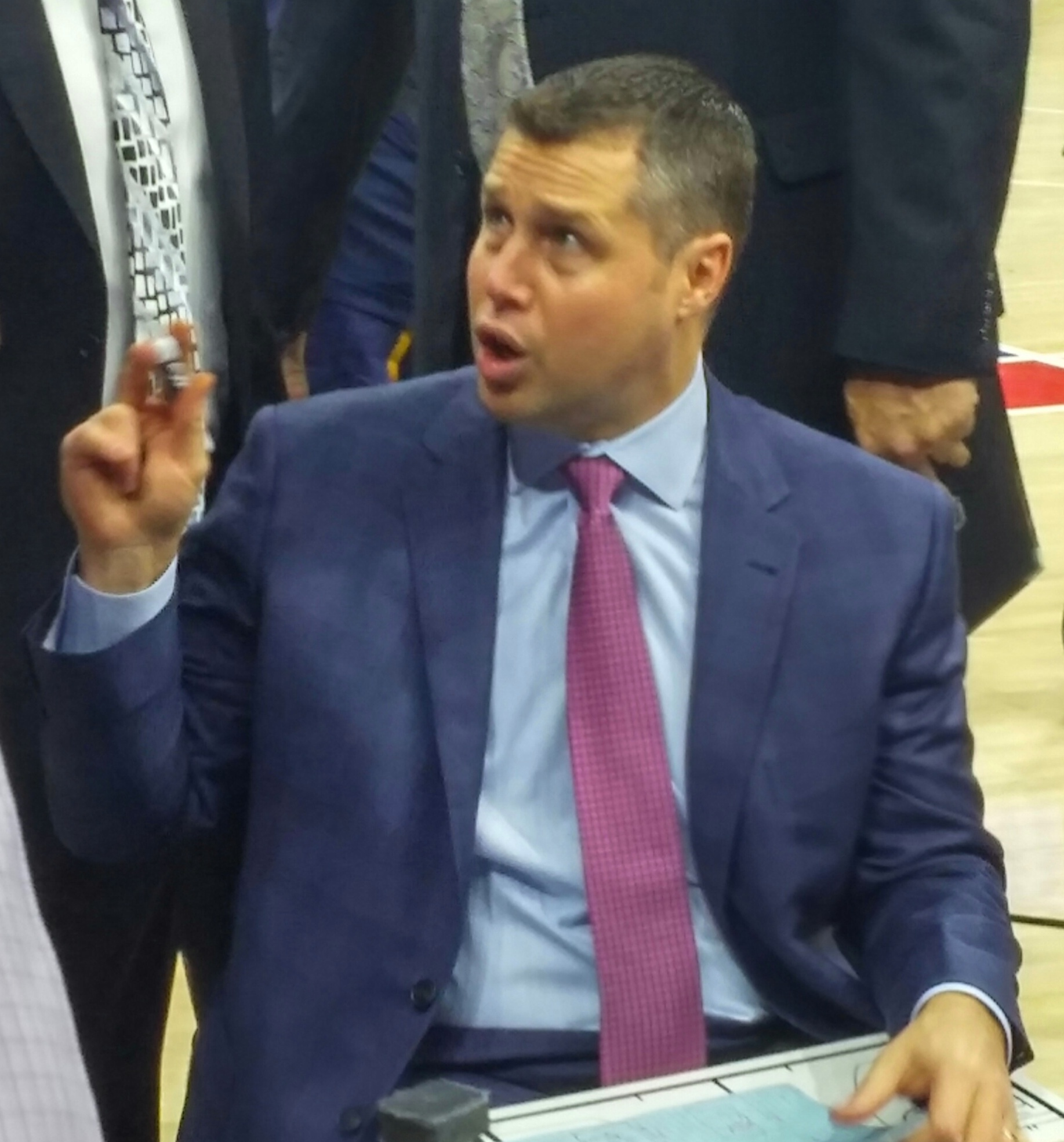
Dave Joerger was the coach for the Grizzlies from 2013 to 2016.

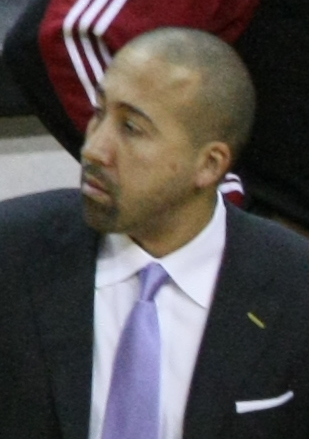
David Fizdale was the coach for the Grizzlies from 2016 to 2017.

== Notes ==
- ^{a} A person who has made a significant contribution to the game of basketball.
- ^{b} A running total of the number of coaches of the Grizzlies. Thus, any coach who has two or more separate terms as head coach is only counted once.
- ^{c} Each year is linked to an article about that particular NBA season.
