= List of Orlando Magic head coaches =

The Orlando Magic are an American professional basketball team based in Orlando, Florida. They play in the Southeast Division of the Eastern Conference in the National Basketball Association (NBA). The franchise was founded in 1989 as an expansion team, and plays at the Kia Center. The team is owned by Orlando Magic, Ltd., a subsidiary of RDV Sports, Inc. The team has won eight division titles (1995, 1996, 2008, 2009, 2010, 2019, 2024, 2025), two conference titles (1995, 2009), but no league championships.

There have been thirteen head coaches for the Magic franchise. The team's first head coach was Matt Guokas, who coached the team for 328 games over four seasons. Brian Hill is the team's all-time leader in regular-season games coached (459). Hill is also the team's all-time leader in regular-season games won (267), and he is the team's only coach to have coached during two non-consecutive periods. Stan Van Gundy was the team's coach from the beginning of the 2007–08 season until the end of the 2011–12 season. He is the team's all-time leader in playoff games coached (59), playoff games won (31), regular-season winning percentage (.657), and playoff winning percentage (.523). Doc Rivers is the team's only coach to have won the NBA Coach of the Year award, winning it after the 1999–2000 season. Chris Jent is the team's only head coach to have spent his entire career with the Magic.

On July 28, 2012, Jacque Vaughn was named the new head coach. He was the assistant coach for the San Antonio Spurs in the two seasons prior to his hiring.

On May 29, 2015, the Magic hired their former point guard Scott Skiles as the franchise's 12th head coach.

When Skiles resigned after one season, the Magic hired Frank Vogel as his successor. Vogel was fired following the end of the 2017–18 season. Steve Clifford succeeded Vogel, coaching until the end of the 2020-21 season. Jamahl Mosley took over the team after that, where he won two division championships and made three playoff appearances in five seasons. After the Magic were eliminated from the 2025-26 playoffs, Mosley was fired.

== Key ==
GC	Games coached
W	Wins
L	Losses
Win%	Winning percentage
#	Number of coaches^{[a]}
*	Spent entire NBA head coaching career with the Magic
†	Inducted into the Basketball Hall of Fame as a coach

== Coaches ==
Note: Statistics are correct through the end of the 2025–26 season.

#	Name	Term^{[b]}	GC	W	L	Win%	GC	W	L	Win%	Achievements	Reference
#	Name	Term^{[b]}	Regular season				Playoffs				Achievements	Reference
1	Matt Guokas	1989–1993	328	111	217	.338	—	—	—	—		
2	Brian Hill	1993–1997	295	191	104	.647	36	18	18	.500	Eastern Conference Championship (1995)	
3	Richie Adubato	1997	33	21	12	.636	5	2	3	.400		
4	Chuck Daly†	1997–1999	132	74	58	.561	4	1	3	.250		
5	Doc Rivers	1999–2003	339	171	168	.504	15	5	10	.333	1999–2000 NBA Coach of the Year	
6	Johnny Davis	2003–2005	135	51	84	.378	—	—	—	—		
7	Chris Jent*	2005	18	5	13	.278	—	—	—	—		
—	Brian Hill	2005–2007	164	76	88	.463	4	0	4	.000		
8	Stan Van Gundy	2007–2012	394	259	135	.657	59	31	28	.525	Eastern Conference Championship (2009)	
9	Jacque Vaughn	2012–2015	216	58	158	.269	—	—	—	—		
10	James Borrego	2015	30	10	20	.333	—	—	—	—		
11	Scott Skiles	2015–2016	82	35	47	.427	—	—	—	—		
12	Frank Vogel	2016–2018	164	54	110	.329	—	—	—	—		
13	Steve Clifford	2018–2021	227	96	131	.423	10	2	8	.200		
14	Jamahl Mosley*	2021–2026	410	189	221	.461	19	7	12	.368		
15	Sean Sweeney*	2026–present	—	—	—	–	—	—	—	–		

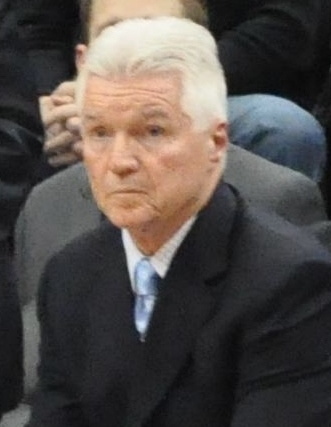
Brian Hill coached the Magic to their first NBA Finals appearance in franchise history in 1995.

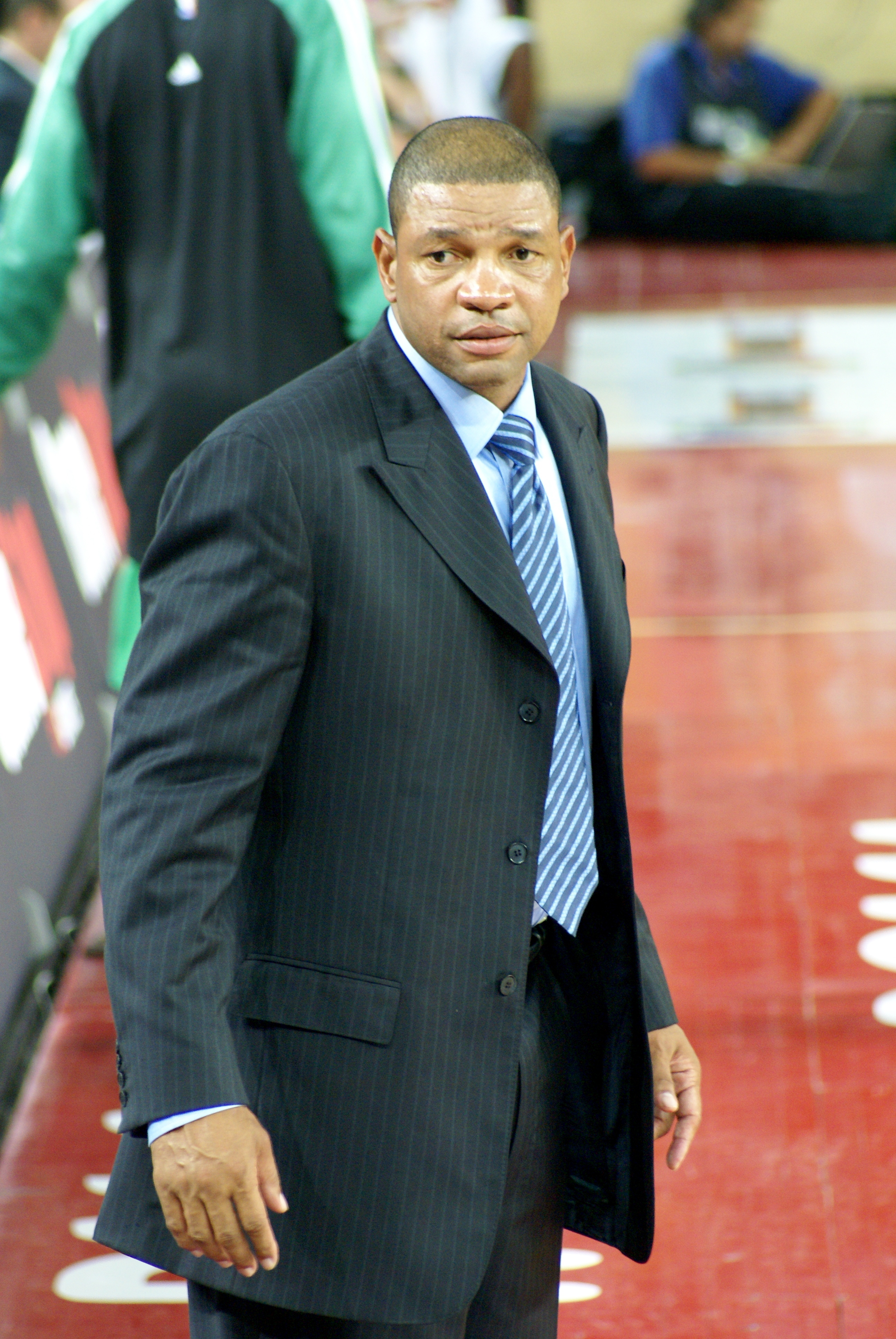
Doc Rivers is the Orlando Magic's only coach to have won Coach of the Year.

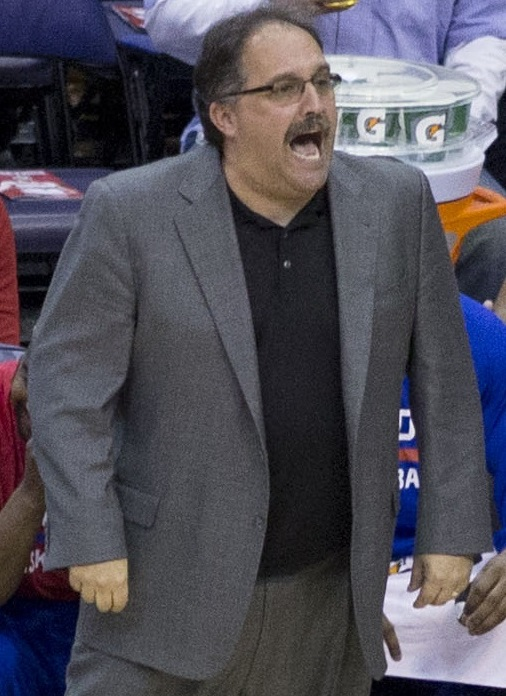
Stan Van Gundy coached the Magic to their second NBA Finals appearance in franchise history in 2009.

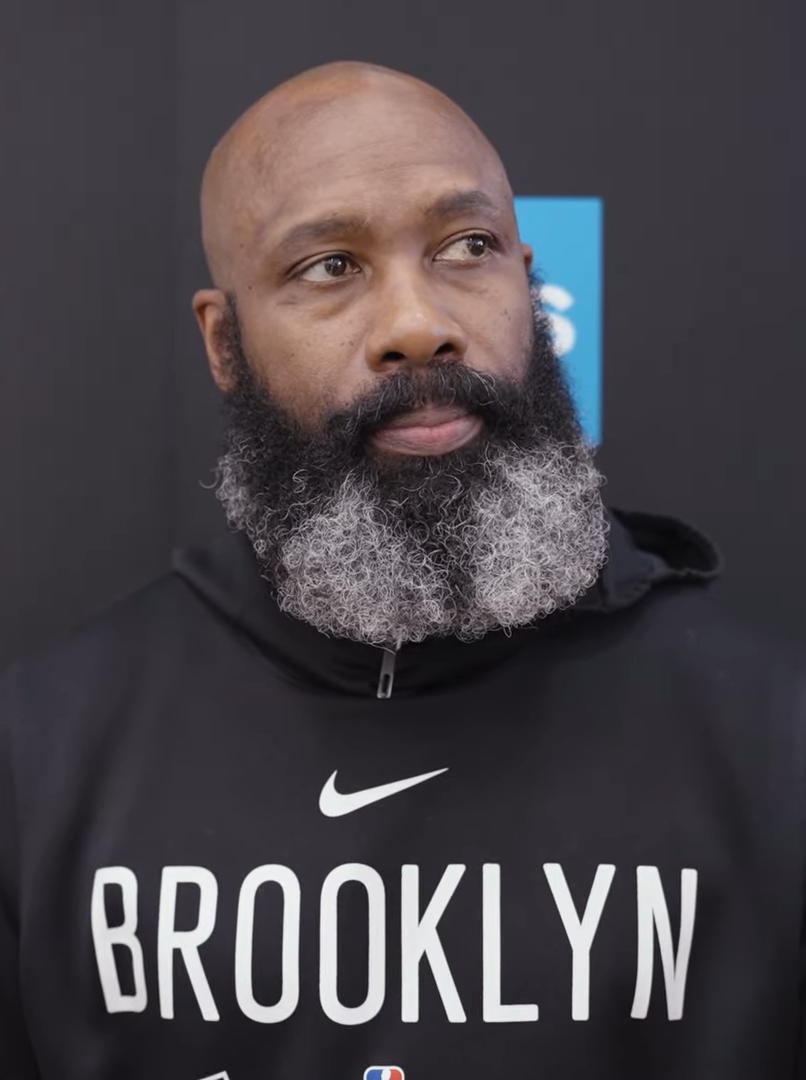
Jacque Vaughn was the head coach of the Magic from 2012–2015.

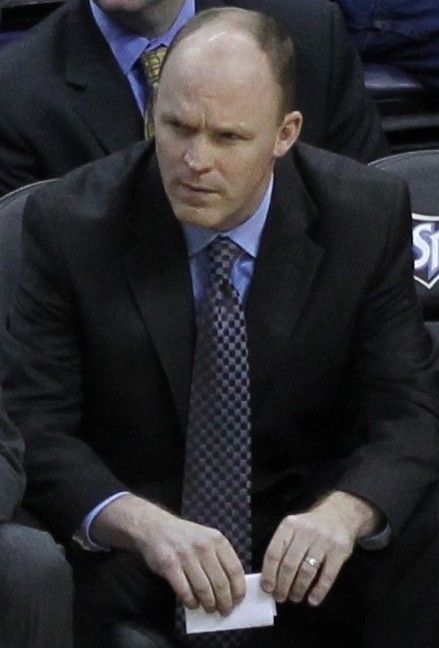
Scott Skiles was the head coach of the Magic from 2015–2016.

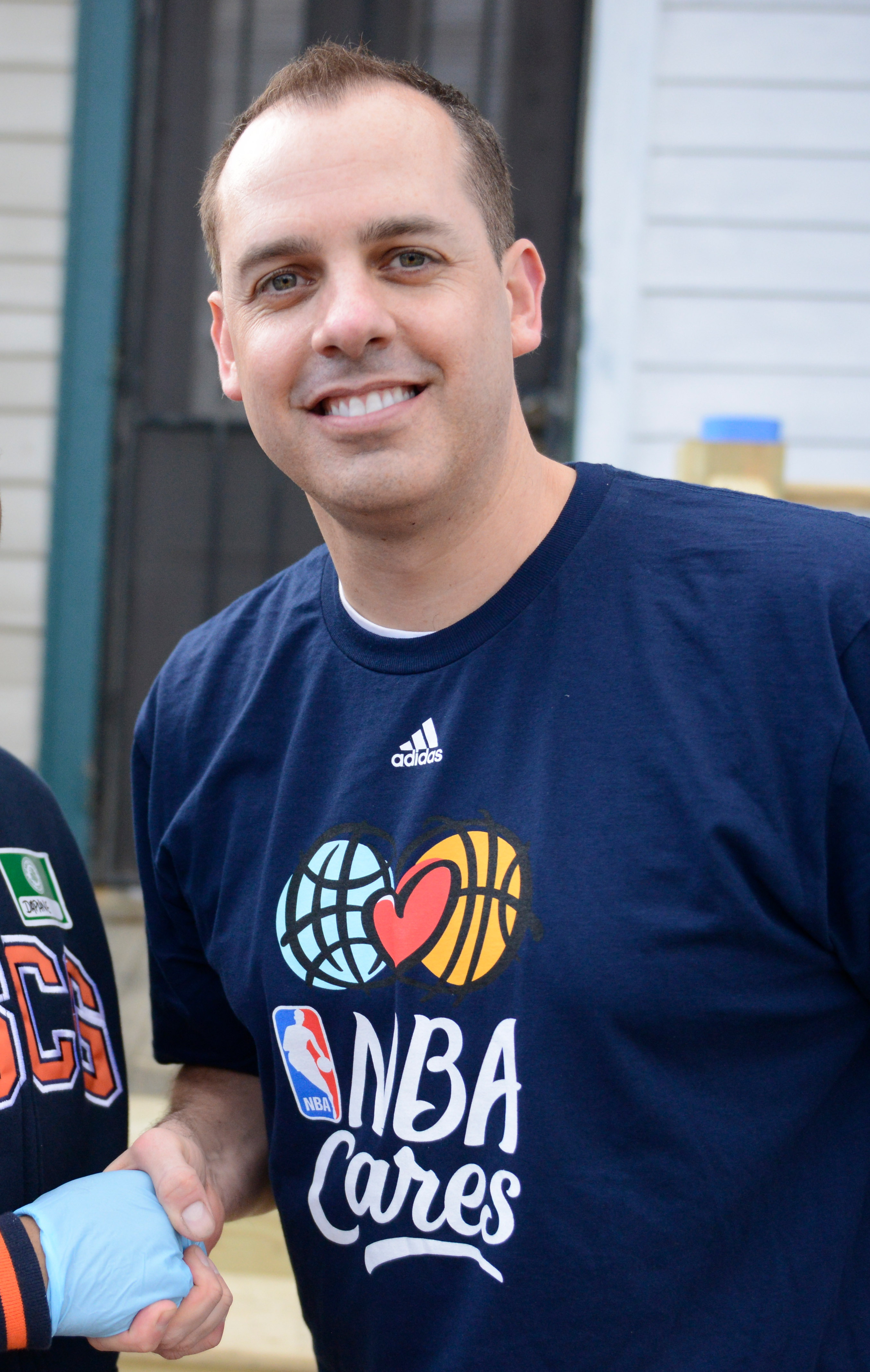
Frank Vogel coached the Orlando Magic from 2016–2018.

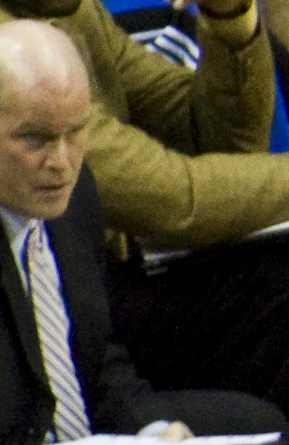
Steve Clifford served as the Magic's head coach from 2018–2021.

== Notes ==
- ^{a} A running total of the number of coaches of the Magic. Thus any coach who has two or more separate terms as head coach is only counted once.
- ^{b} Each year is linked to an article about that particular NBA season.
