= List of Detroit Pistons head coaches =

The Detroit Pistons are an American professional basketball team based in Detroit, Michigan. The Pistons, currently owned by Tom Gores, are in the Central Division of the Eastern Conference of the National Basketball Association (NBA), playing their home games at Little Caesars Arena.

The franchise was founded in 1937 by Fred Zollner as the Fort Wayne Zollner Pistons, a semi-professional company basketball team based in Fort Wayne, Indiana. They would turn professional in 1941 when they joined the National Basketball League (NBL). In 1948, the team was renamed the Fort Wayne Pistons and joined the Basketball Association of America (BAA), merging with the NBL to form the NBA one year later. After nine seasons in Fort Wayne, Zollner moved the team to Detroit in 1957 to compete financially with other big city teams. In the 1980s, general manager Jack McCloskey drafted Isiah Thomas, acquired Joe Dumars and Dennis Rodman, and hired head coach Chuck Daly. The 1980s team, known as "the Bad Boys" due to their physical playing style, won both the 1989 and 1990 NBA Finals under Daly. The Pistons won their third and most recent title in the 2004 NBA Finals under Larry Brown.

Since joining the NBA, the Pistons have had 37 head coaches. Carl Bennett was the franchise's first head coach, leading the team for six games, all of which were losses. Daly is the franchise's all-time leader in regular-season games coached (738), regular-season games won (467), playoff games coached (113), and playoff games won (71). Flip Saunders is the franchise's all-time leader in regular season win percentage (.715). Daly and Brown are the only members of the franchise to be inducted to the Basketball Hall of Fame as coaches, with Daly also being selected as one of the top 10 coaches in NBA history. Ray Scott and Rick Carlisle won the NBA Coach of the Year Award for the 1973–74 and 2001–02 season, respectively. Dick Vitale was named to the Basketball Hall of Fame to recognize the work he did as a broadcaster after leaving the franchise. Sixteen head coaches have spent their entire NBA coaching careers with the Pistons. Notable players and coaches who spent time with the Pistons include Curly Armstrong, Red Rocha, Dick McGuire, Dave DeBusschere, Donnis Butcher, Terry Dischinger, Earl Lloyd, Ray Scott, and Michael Curry.

The current head coach of the Pistons is J. B. Bickerstaff.

== Key ==
GC	Games coached
W	Wins
L	Losses
Win%	Winning percentage
#	Number of coaches^{[a]}
*	Spent entire NBA head coaching career with the Pistons
‡	Elected into the Basketball Hall of Fame as a coach

== Coaches ==
Note: Statistics are correct through the end of the 2025–26 season. The list does not include NBL seasons.

#	Name	Term^{[b]}	GC	W	L	Win%	GC	W	L	Win%	Achievements	Reference
#	Name	Term^{[b]}	Regular season				Playoffs				Achievements	Reference
Fort Wayne Pistons
1	Carl Bennett*	1948	6	0	6	.000	—	—	—	—		
2	Curly Armstrong*	1948–1949 (as player-coach)	54	22	32	.407	—	—	—	—		
3	Murray Mendenhall*	1949–1951	136	72	64	.529	7	3	4	.429		
4	Paul Birch	1951–1954	207	105	102	.507	14	4	10	.286		
5	Charley Eckman*	1954–1957	216	114	102	.528	24	10	14	.417		
Detroit Pistons
—	Charley Eckman*	1957	25	9	16	.360	0	0	0	–		
6	Red Rocha*	1957–1960	153	65	88	.425	10	4	6	.400		
7	Dick McGuire	1959–1960 (as player-coach); 1960–1963	280	122	158	.436	21	8	13	.381		
8	Charles Wolf	1963–1964	91	25	66	.433	—	—	—	—		
9	Dave DeBusschere*	1964–1967 (as player-coach)	222	79	143	.356	—	—	—	—		
10	Donnis Butcher*	1967–1968	112	52	60	.464	6	2	4	.333		
11	Paul Seymour	1968–1969	60	22	38	.367	—	—	—	—		
12	Butch van Breda Kolff	1969–1971	174	82	92	.471	—	—	—	—		
13	Terry Dischinger*	1971 (as player-coach)	2	0	2	.000	—	—	—	—		
14	Earl Lloyd*	1971–1972	77	22	55	.286	—	—	—	—		
15	Ray Scott*	1972–1976	281	147	134	.523	10	4	6	.400	1973–74 NBA Coach of the Year	
16	Herb Brown*	1976–1977	146	72	74	.493	12	5	7	.417		
17	Bob Kauffman*	1977–1978	58	29	29	.500	—	—	—	—		
18	Dick Vitale*	1978–1979	94	34	60	.362	—	—	—	—		
19	Richie Adubato	1979–1980	70	12	58	.171	—	—	—	—		
20	Scotty Robertson	1980–1983	246	97	149	.394	—	—	—	—		
21	Chuck Daly‡	1983–1992	738	467	271	.633	113	71	42	.628	2 NBA championships (1989, 1990); One of the top 10 coaches in NBA history	
22	Ron Rothstein	1992–1993	82	40	42	.488	—	—	—	—		
23	Don Chaney	1993–1995	164	48	116	.293	—	—	—	—		
24	Doug Collins	1995–1998	209	121	88	.579	8	2	6	.250		
25	Alvin Gentry	1998–2000	145	73	72	.503	5	2	3	.400		
26	George Irvine	2000–2001	106	46	60	.434	3	0	3	.000		
27	Rick Carlisle	2001–2003	164	100	64	.610	27	12	15	.444	2001–02 NBA Coach of the Year	
28	Larry Brown‡	2003–2005	164	108	56	.659	48	31	17	.646	NBA championship (2004)	
29	Flip Saunders	2005–2008	246	176	70	.715	51	30	21	.588		
30	Michael Curry*	2008–2009	82	39	43	.476	4	0	4	.000		
31	John Kuester*	2009–2011	164	57	107	.348	—	—	—	—		
32	Lawrence Frank	2011–2013	148	54	94	.365	—	—	—	—		
33	Maurice Cheeks	2013–2014	50	21	29	.420	—	—	—	—		
34	John Loyer*	2014	32	8	24	.250	—	—	—	—		
35	Stan Van Gundy	2014–2018	328	152	176	.463	4	0	4	.000		
36	Dwane Casey	2018–2023	384	121	263	.315	4	0	4	.000		
37	Monty Williams	2023–2024	82	14	68	.171	—	—	—	–		
38	J. B. Bickerstaff	2024–present	164	104	60	.634	20	9	11	.450		

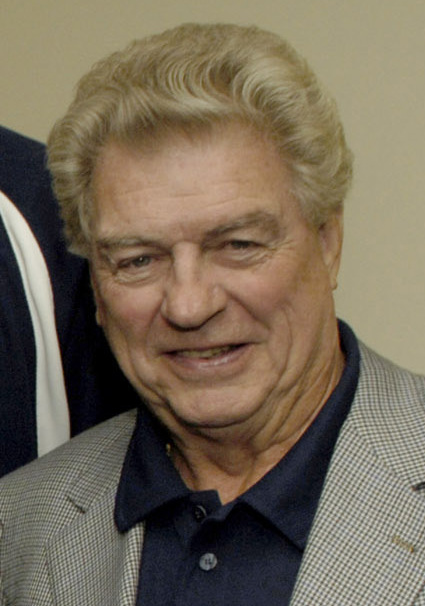
Chuck Daly led the Pistons to two consecutive championships in the 1980s. He was inducted into the Basketball Hall of Fame in 1994.

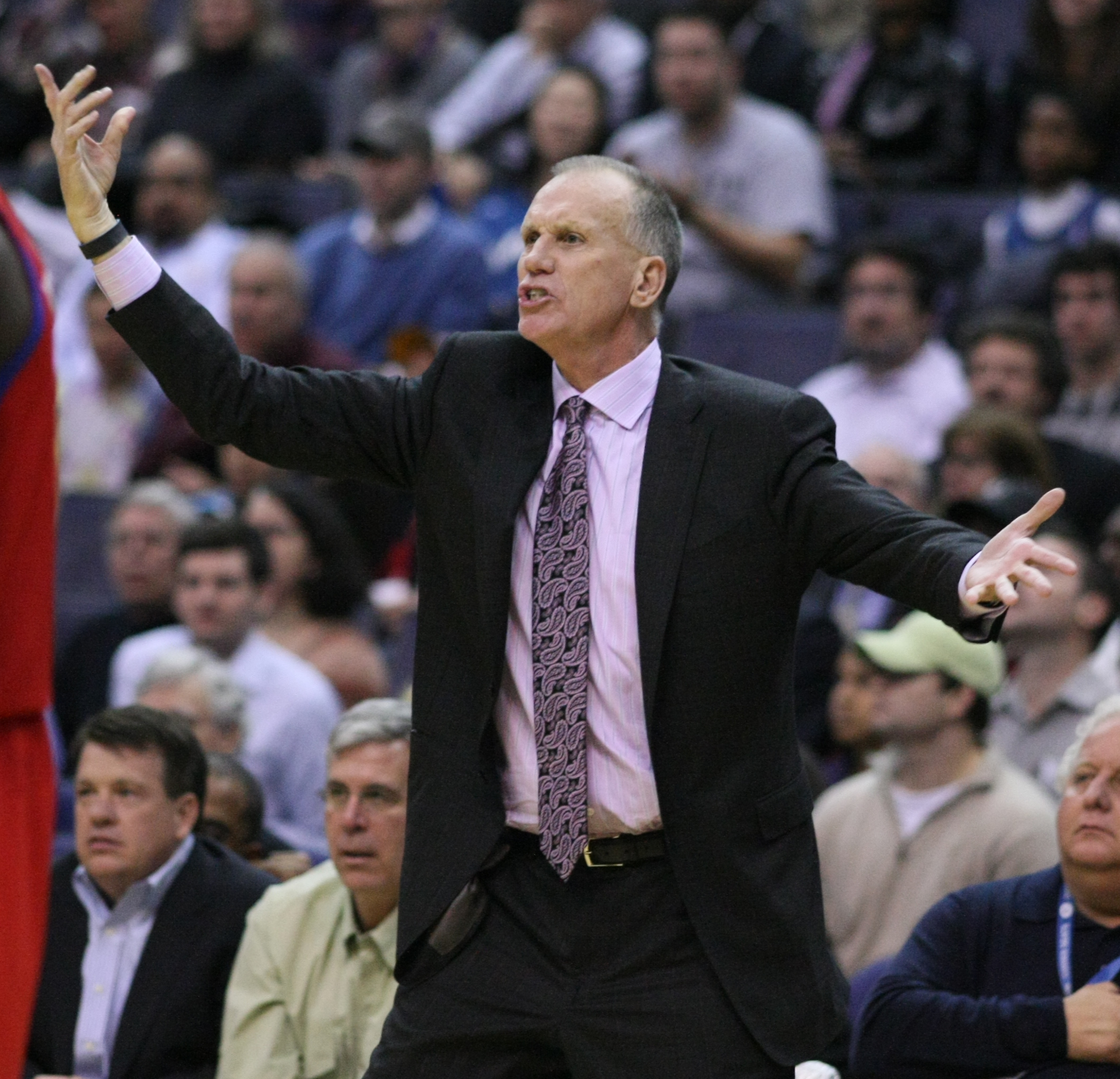
Doug Collins was the head coach for the Pistons from 1995 to 1998.

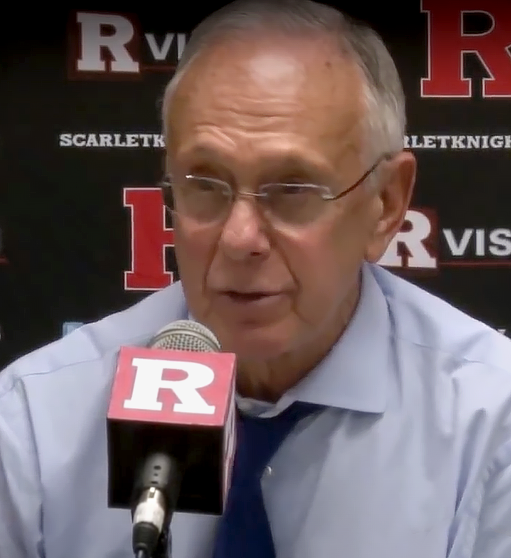
Larry Brown was the Detroit Pistons head coach from 2003 to 2005 and led the team to the NBA championship in 2004.

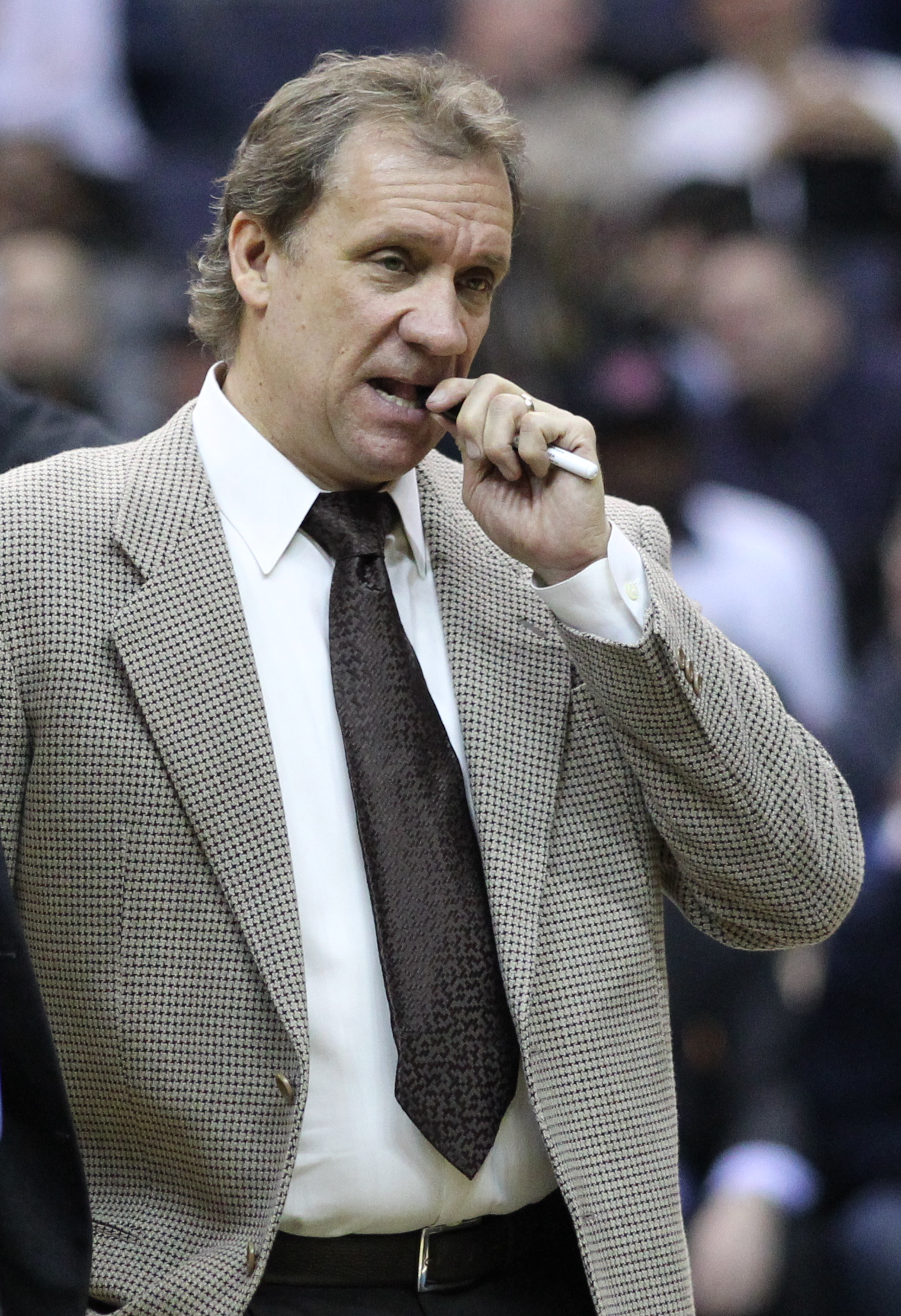
Flip Saunders was the coach for the Pistons from 2005 to 2008.

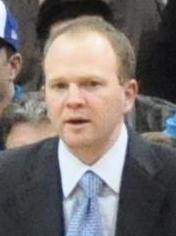
Lawrence Frank was the coach for the Pistons from 2011 to 2013.

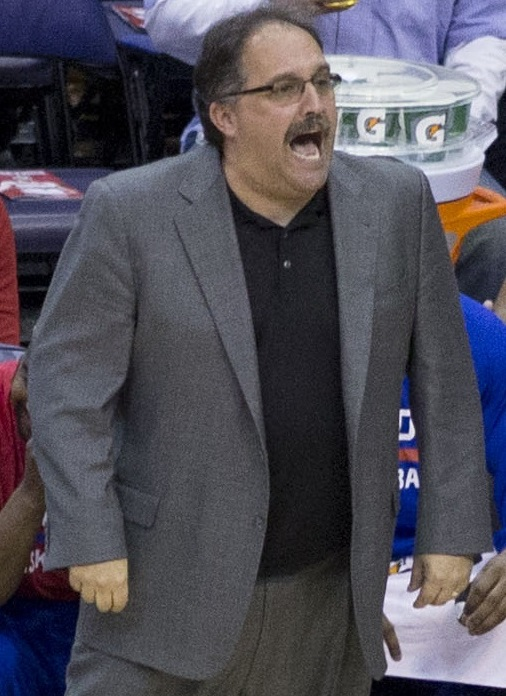
Stan Van Gundy was the coach for the Pistons from 2014 to 2018.

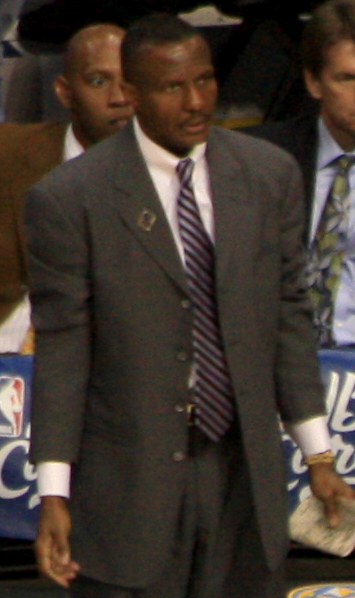
Dwane Casey was the coach for the Pistons from 2018 to 2023.

== Notes ==
- ^{a} A running total of the number of coaches of the Pistons. Thus, any coach who has two or more separate terms as head coach is only counted once.
- ^{b} Each year is linked to an article about that particular NBA season.
