= List of Minnesota Timberwolves head coaches =

The Minnesota Timberwolves are an American professional basketball team based in Minneapolis, Minnesota. They play in the Northwest Division of the Western Conference in the National Basketball Association (NBA). There have been 14 head coaches for the Timberwolves.

The franchise's first head coach was Bill Musselman, who coached for two complete seasons. Musselman, along with Kurt Rambis and Rick Adelman, are the only Timberwolves head coaches to have not been involved in a mid-season replacement. In the 2003–04 season, Flip Saunders became the first and to date only Timberwolves head coach to have led the team to a division championship. Saunders, along with current head coach Chris Finch, are the only two to have led the team to the Western Conference Finals. With a playoffs record of 17 wins and 30 losses, 819 regular season games coached, 427 regular season wins, and 392 regular season losses, Saunders leads all Timberwolves head coaches and is second to Finch's regular season winning percentage of .557. Saunders, Adelman, Tom Thibodeau, and Finch are the only four who have been head coach of the Timberwolves for more than two complete seasons. Saunders returned to the Timberwolves in 2013 as President of Basketball Operations and part-owner, and became head coach once again in 2014.

Though none of the Timberwolves coaches have been elected into the Basketball Hall of Fame as a coach, Kevin McHale has been elected into the Hall of Fame as a player in 1999. McHale coached the Timberwolves in two separate stints, and was the Timberwolves Vice President of Basketball Operations from 1995 to 2009. Sidney Lowe and Sam Mitchell are the only persons to have been both a player and a head coach for the Timberwolves.

== Key ==
Key of abbreviations
Abbreviation	Definition
GC	Games coached
W	Wins
L	Losses
Win%	Winning percentage
#	Number of coaches^{[a]}
—	Does not apply

== Head coaches ==
Note: Statistics are current through April 13, 2026.

Minnesota Timberwolves head coaches
	Name	Term^{[b]}	GC	W	L	Win%	GC	W	L	Win%	Achievements	Reference
	Name	Term^{[b]}	Regular season				Playoffs				Achievements	Reference
1	Bill Musselman	1989–1991	164	51	113	.311	—	—	—	—		
2	Jimmy Rodgers	1991–1993	111	21	90	.189	—	—	—	—		
3	Sidney Lowe	1993–1994	135	33	102	.244	—	—	—	—		
4	Bill Blair	1994–1995	102	27	75	.265	—	—	—	—		
5	Flip Saunders	1995–2005	737	411	326	.558	47	17	30	.362	2003–04 Midwest Division championship	
6	Kevin McHale	2005	31	19	12	.613	—	—	—	—		
7	Dwane Casey	2005–2007	122	53	69	.434	—	—	—	—		
8	Randy Wittman	2007–2008	143	38	105	.266	—	—	—	—		
—	Kevin McHale	2008–2009	63	20	43	.317	—	—	—	—		
9	Kurt Rambis	2009–2011	164	32	132	.195	—	—	—	—		
10	Rick Adelman	2011–2014	230	97	133	.422	—	—	—	—		
—	Flip Saunders	2014–2015	82	16	66	.195	—	—	—	—		
11	Sam Mitchell	2015–2016	82	29	53	.354	—	—	—	—		
12	Tom Thibodeau	2016–2019	204	97	107	.475	5	1	4	.200		
13	Ryan Saunders	2019–2021	137	43	94	.314	—	—	—	—		
14	Chris Finch	2021–present	451	258	193	.572	54	27	27	.500		

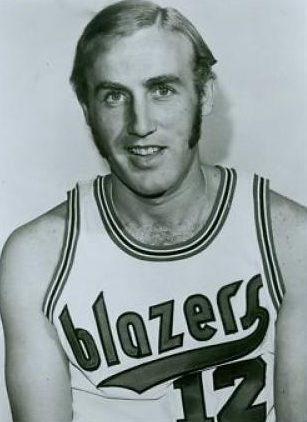
Rick Adelman coached the team for three seasons.

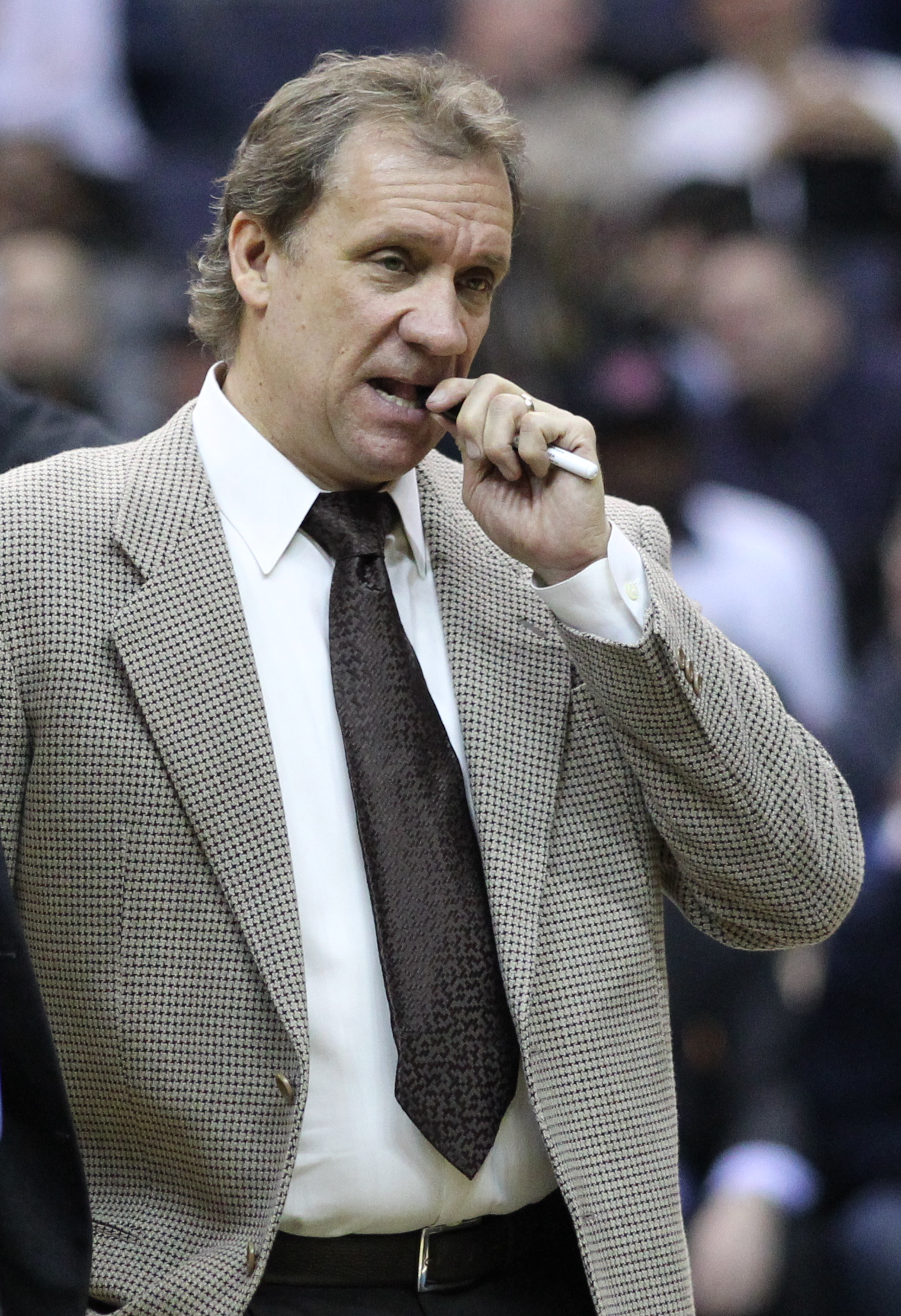
Flip Saunders was the head coach of the Timberwolves for 10 seasons.

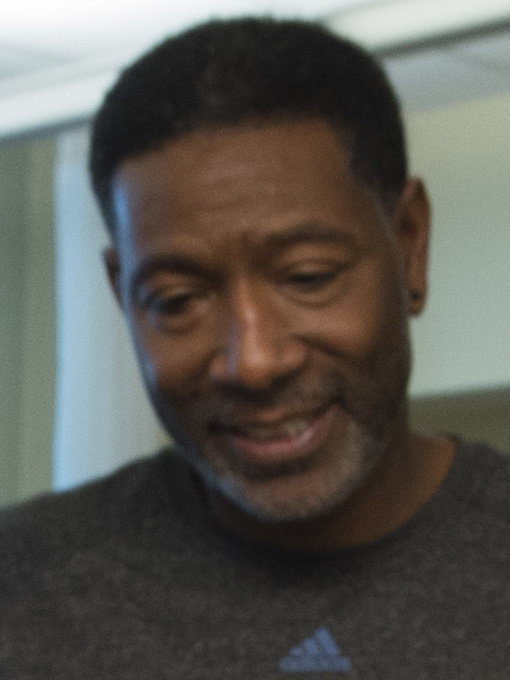
On October 25, 2015, Saunders died and Mitchell took head coaching duties.

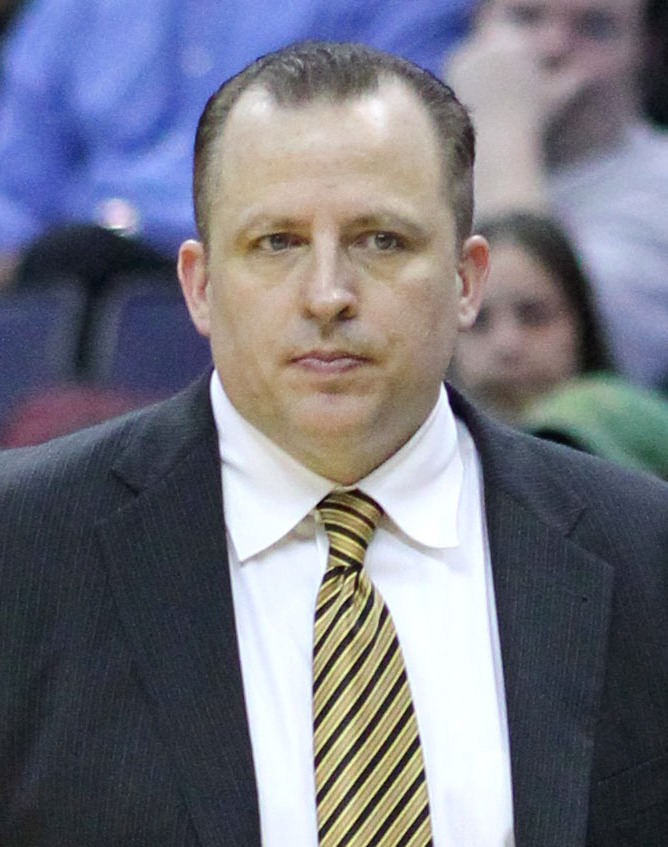
Tom Thibodeau coached the team for three seasons.

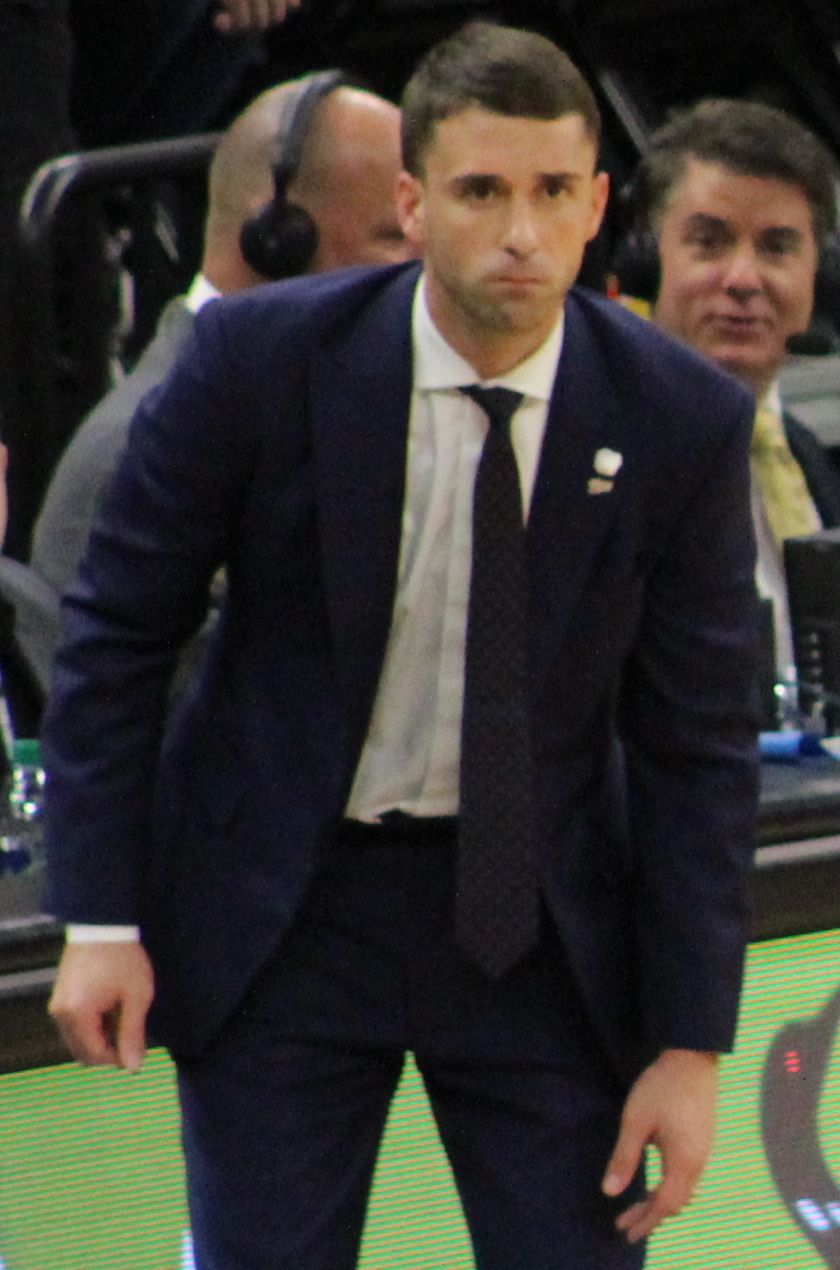
Ryan Saunders was the head coach of the team for two seasons.

== Head coaches with multiple tenures ==
Minnesota Timberwolves head coaches with multiple tenures
Name	Term^{[b]}	GC	W	L	Win%	Reference
Name	Term^{[b]}	Regular season				Reference
Kevin McHale	2005; 2008–2009	94	39	55	.415	
Flip Saunders	1995–2005; 2014–2015	819	427	392	.521	

== Notes ==
- ^{a} A running total of the number of coaches of the Timberwolves. Thus, any coach who has two or more separate terms as head coach is only counted once.
- ^{b 1} ^{2} Each year is linked to an article about that particular NBA season.
