= List of Milwaukee Bucks head coaches =

The Milwaukee Bucks are an American professional basketball franchise based in Milwaukee, Wisconsin. They are a member of the Central Division of the Eastern Conference in the National Basketball Association (NBA). The team plays their home games at the Fiserv Forum. The Bucks are owned by Wes Edens and Marc Lasry, with Jon Horst as their general manager.

Since the team was formed in 1968, there have been 15 head coaches for the Bucks franchise. The franchise won its first NBA championship in the 1971 NBA Finals under the leadership of its first coach, Larry Costello, and another in the 2021 NBA Finals under Coach Mike Budenholzer (the only other Bucks' coach other than Don Nelson to have won coach of the year). Don Nelson is the franchise's all-time leader for the most regular season games coached (884), most regular season games won (540), most playoff games coached (88), and most playoff games won (42). Nelson is also the only Bucks coach to win an NBA Coach of the Year Award while also being one of the top 10 coaches in NBA history. Larry Krystkowiak and Joe Prunty are the only people to have spent their entire head coaching career with the Bucks. Mike Dunleavy, Krystkowiak, and Scott Skiles have played and coached for the Bucks. Skiles was the head coach of the Bucks from 2008 until he and the team mutually agreed to part ways in 2013.

== Key ==
GC	Games coached
W	Wins
L	Losses
Win%	Winning percentage
#	Number of coaches^{[a]}
*	Spent entire NBA head coaching career with the Bucks
†	Elected into the Basketball Hall of Fame as a coach

== Coaches ==
Note: Statistics are correct through the end of the 2025–26 season.

#	Name	Term^{[b]}	GC	W	L	Win%	GC	W	L	Win%	Achievements	Reference
#	Name	Term^{[b]}	Regular season				Playoffs				Achievements	Reference
1	Larry Costello	1968–1976	674	410	264	.608	60	37	23	.617	1 Championship (1971)	
2	Don Nelson†	1976–1987	884	540	344	.611	88	42	46	.477	NBA Coach of the Year (1983, 1985); One of the top 10 coaches in NBA history	
3	Del Harris	1987–1991	345	191	154	.554	21	6	15	.286		
4	Frank Hamblen	1991–1992	65	23	42	.354	—	—	—	—		
5	Mike Dunleavy	1992–1996	328	107	221	.326	—	—	—	—		
6	Chris Ford	1996–1998	164	69	95	.421	—	—	—	—		
7	George Karl†	1998–2003	378	205	173	.542	32	14	18	.438		
8	Terry Porter	2003–2005	164	71	93	.433	5	1	4	.200		
9	Terry Stotts	2005–2007	146	63	83	.432	5	1	4	.200		
10	Larry Krystkowiak*	2007–2008	100	31	69	.310	—	—	—	—		
11	Scott Skiles	2008–2013	344	162	182	.471	7	3	4	.429		
12	Jim Boylan	2013	50	22	28	.444	4	0	4	.000		
13	Larry Drew	2013–2014	82	15	67	.183	－	－	－	.---		
14	Jason Kidd	2014–2018	291	139	152	.478	12	4	8	.333		
15	Joe Prunty	2018	37	21	16	.568	7	3	4	.429		
16	Mike Budenholzer	2018–2023	391	271	120	.693	65	39	26	.600	NBA Coach of the Year (2019); 1 Championship (2021)	
17	Adrian Griffin*	2023–2024	43	30	13	.698	—	—	—	–		
—	Joe Prunty	2024	3	2	1	.667	—	—	—	–		
18	Doc Rivers	2024–2026	200	97	103	.485	5	1	4	.200		
19	Taylor Jenkins	2026–present	—	—	—	–	—	—	—	–		

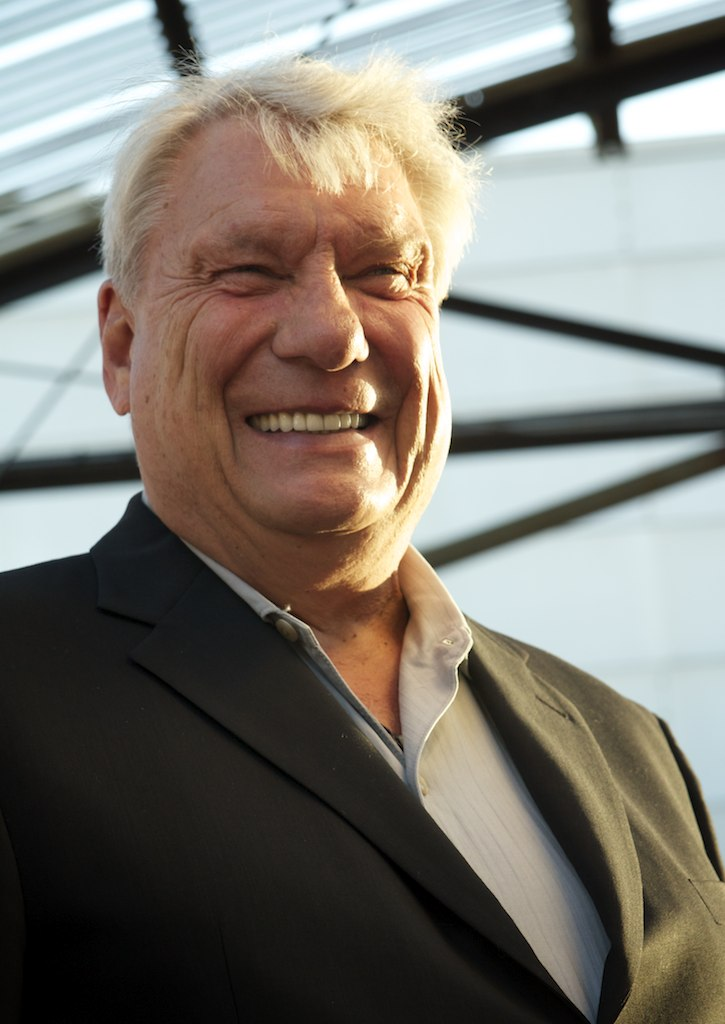
Don Nelson was the head coach for the Bucks from 1976 to 1987.

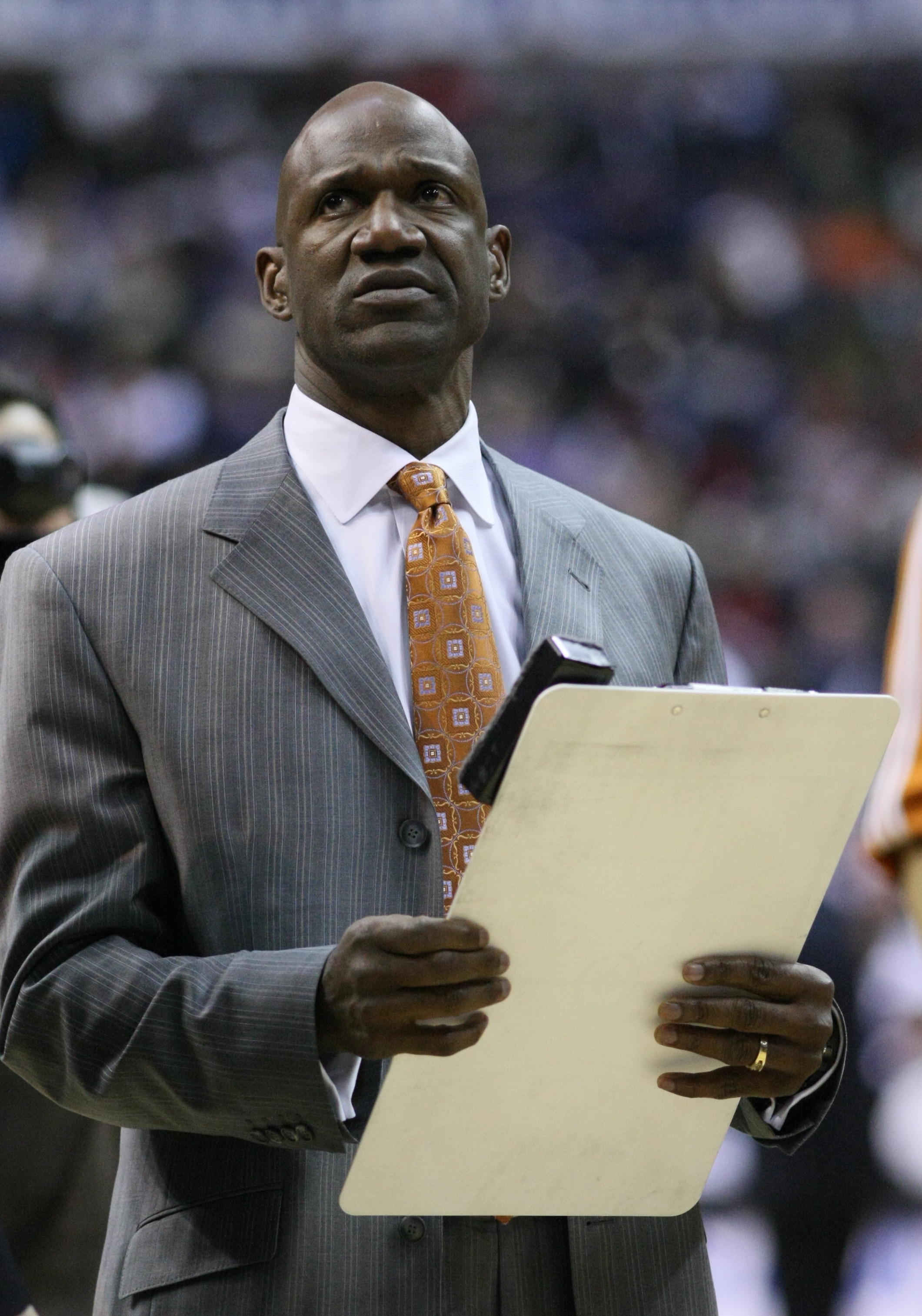
Terry Porter was the head coach of the Bucks for two seasons.

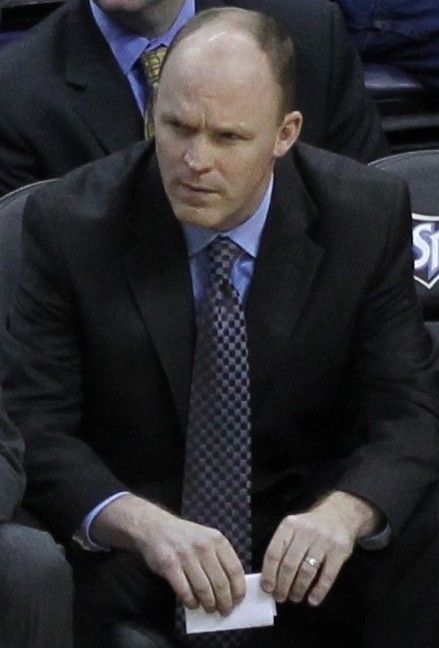
Scott Skiles was the head coach for the Bucks from 2008 to 2013.

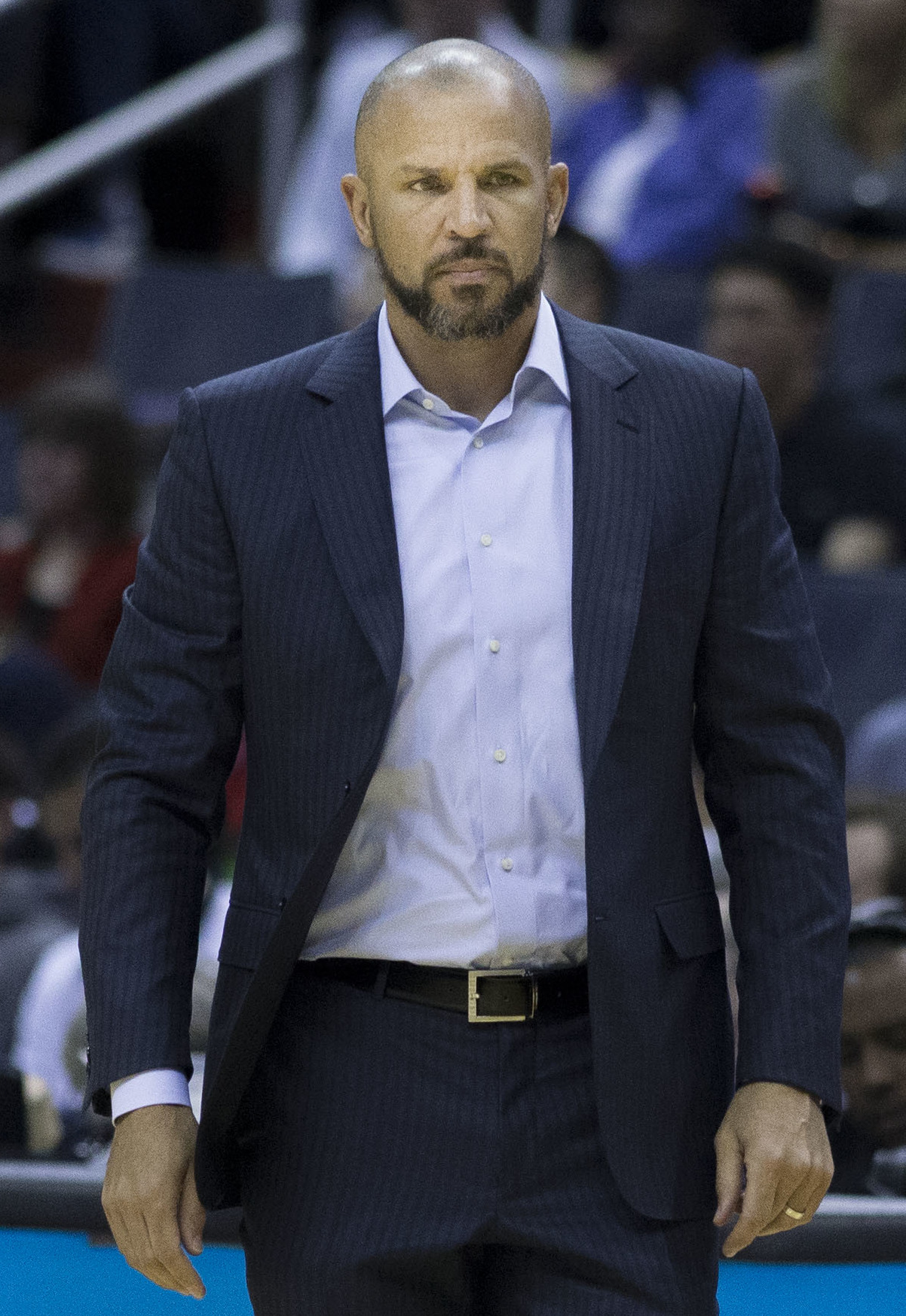
Jason Kidd was the head coach for the Bucks from 2014 to 2018.

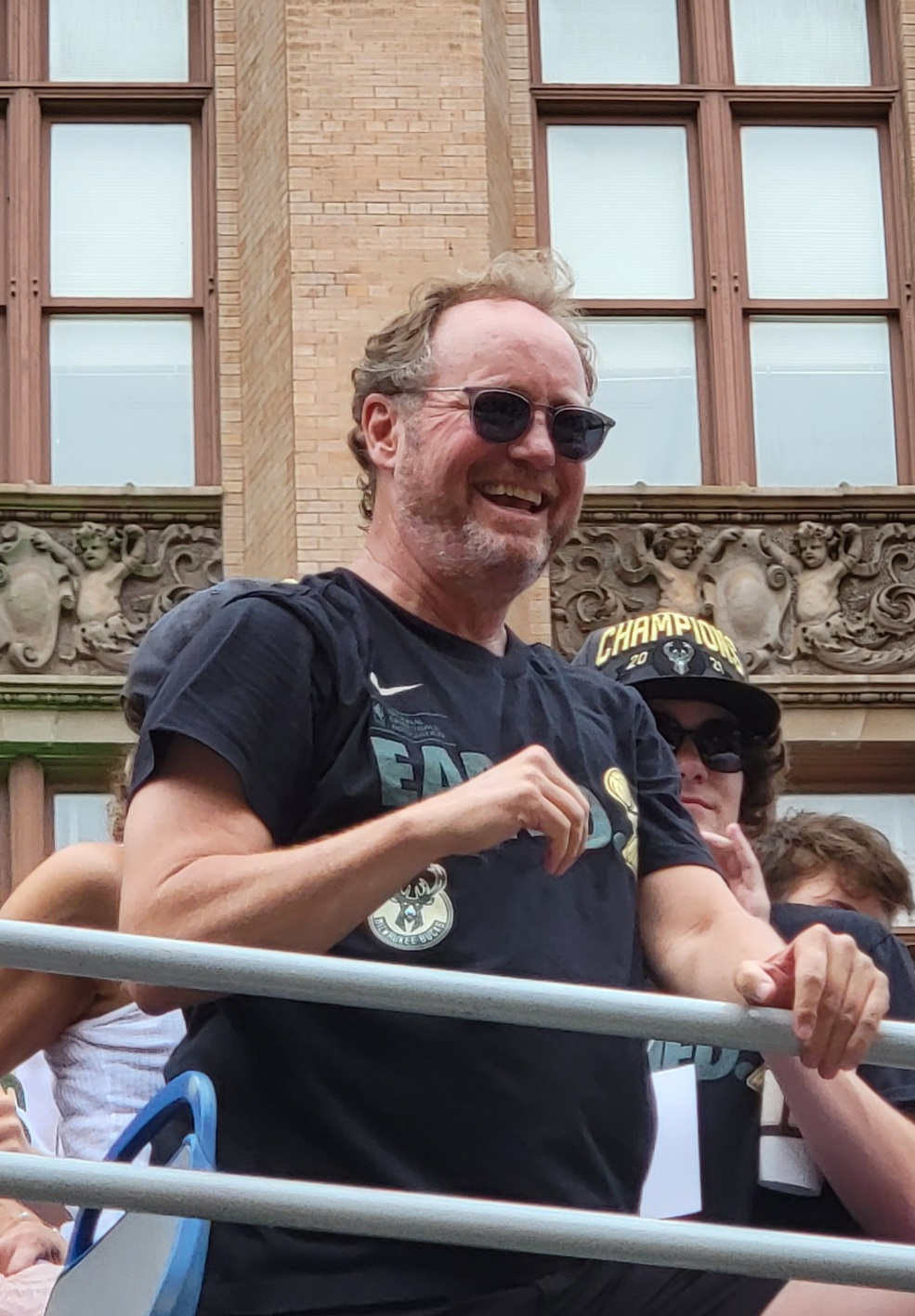
Mike Budenholzer was the head coach for the Bucks from 2018 to 2023.

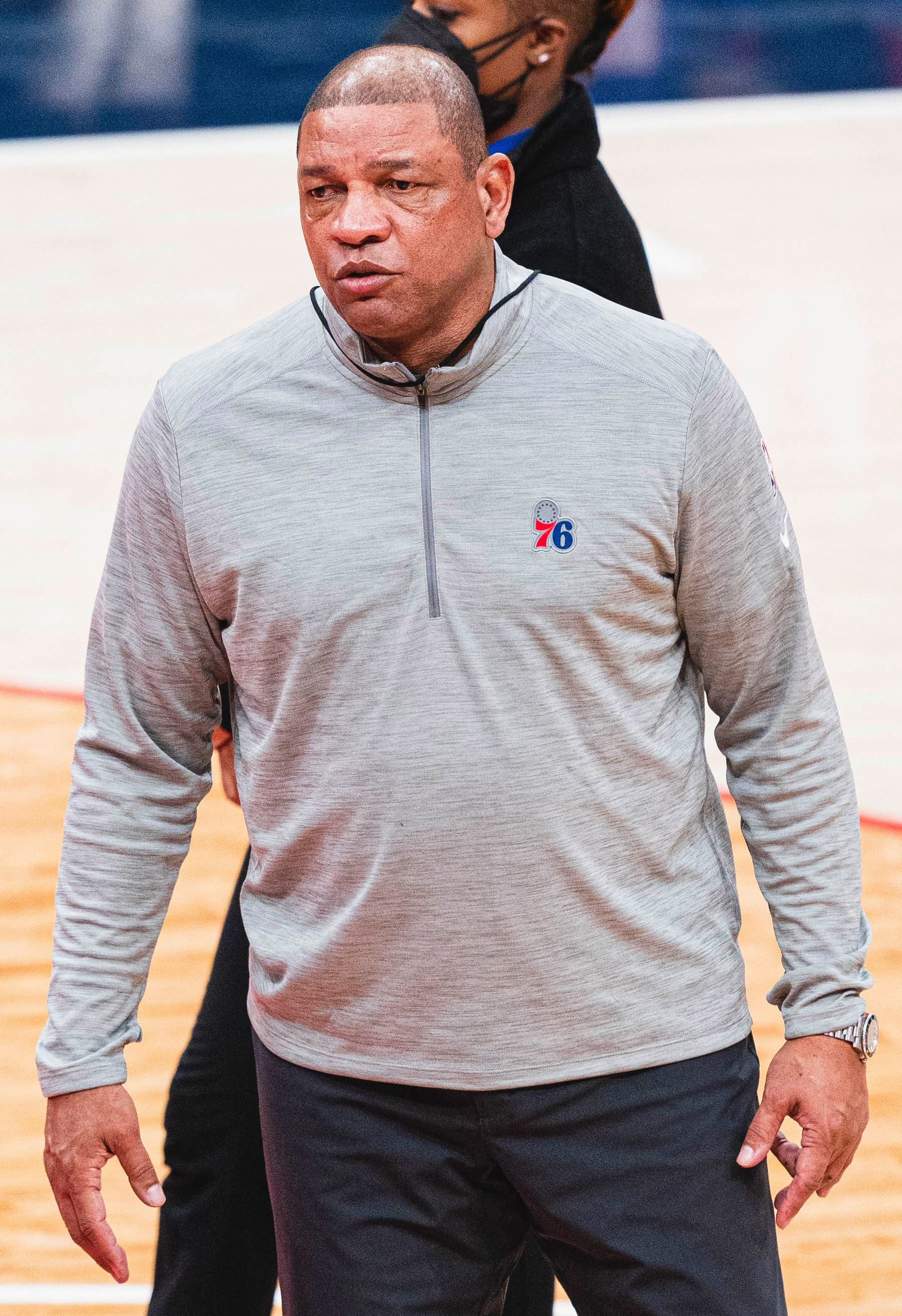
Doc Rivers was the head coach for the Bucks from 2024 to 2026.

== Notes ==
- ^{a} A running total of the number of coaches of the Milwaukee Bucks. Thus, any coach who has two or more separate terms as head coach is only counted once.
- ^{b} Each year is linked to an article about that particular NBA season.
