= List of FIBA Asia Cup winning head coaches =

The list of FIBA Asia Cup-winning head coaches shows all of the head coaches that have won the FIBA Asia Cup (formerly FIBA Asia Championship), which is the main international competition for senior men's basketball national teams that is governed by FIBA Asia, the Asian zone within the International Basketball Federation.

== Key ==
(2)	Number of titles
†	Elected into the Naismith Memorial Basketball Hall of Fame as a coach
*	Elected into the FIBA Hall of Fame
† *	Member of both the FIBA Hall of Fame and the Naismith Memorial Basketball Hall of Fame.

== List ==
Year	Head coach	National team	Ref.
1960	(Philippines) Arturo Ruis	Philippines	
1963	(Philippines) Felicisimo Fajardo	Philippines	
1965	(Japan) Tadashi Miura	Japan	
1967	(Philippines) Carlos Loyzaga	Philippines	
1969	(South Korea) Park Sang-yeong	South Korea	
1971	(Japan) Kuninaka Taketomi	Japan	
1973	(Philippines) Valentin Eduque	Philippines	
1975	(China) Qian Chenghai	China	
1977	(China) Qian Chenghai	China	
1979	(China) Ma Qingsheng	China	
1981	(China) Qian Chenghai	China	
1983	(China) Qian Chenghai	China	
1985	(United States) Ron Jacobs	Philippines	
1987	(China) Qian Chenghai	China	
1989	(China) Sun Bang	China	
1991	(China) Jiang Xingquan	China	
1993	(China) Jiang Xingquan	China	
1995	(China) Jiang Xingquan	China	
1997	(South Korea) Jeong Gwang-seok	South Korea	
1999	(China) Jiang Xingquan	China	
2001	(China) Jiang Xingquan	China	
2003	(China) Jiang Xingquan	China	
2005	(Lithuania) Jonas Kazlauskas	China	
2007	(Serbia) Rajko Toroman	Iran	
2009	(Serbia) Veselin Matić	Iran	
2011	(United States) Bob Donewald Jr.	China	
2013	(Slovenia) Memi Bečirovič	Iran	
2015	(China) Gong Luming	China	
2017	(Australia) Andrej Lemanis	Australia	
2022	(Australia) Michael Clancy	Australia	

== See also ==
- FIBA Basketball World Cup winning head coaches
- List of FIBA AfroBasket winning head coaches
- List of FIBA AmeriCup winning head coaches
- List of FIBA EuroBasket winning head coaches
