= List of FIBA EuroBasket winning head coaches =

The list of FIBA EuroBasket-winning head coaches shows all of the head coaches that have won the FIBA EuroBasket, which is the main international competition for senior men's basketball national teams that is governed by FIBA Europe, the European zone within the International Basketball Federation (FIBA).

== Key ==
(2)	Number of titles
†	Elected into the Naismith Memorial Basketball Hall of Fame as a coach
*	Elected into the FIBA Hall of Fame
† *	Member of both the FIBA Hall of Fame and the Naismith Memorial Basketball Hall of Fame.

== List ==
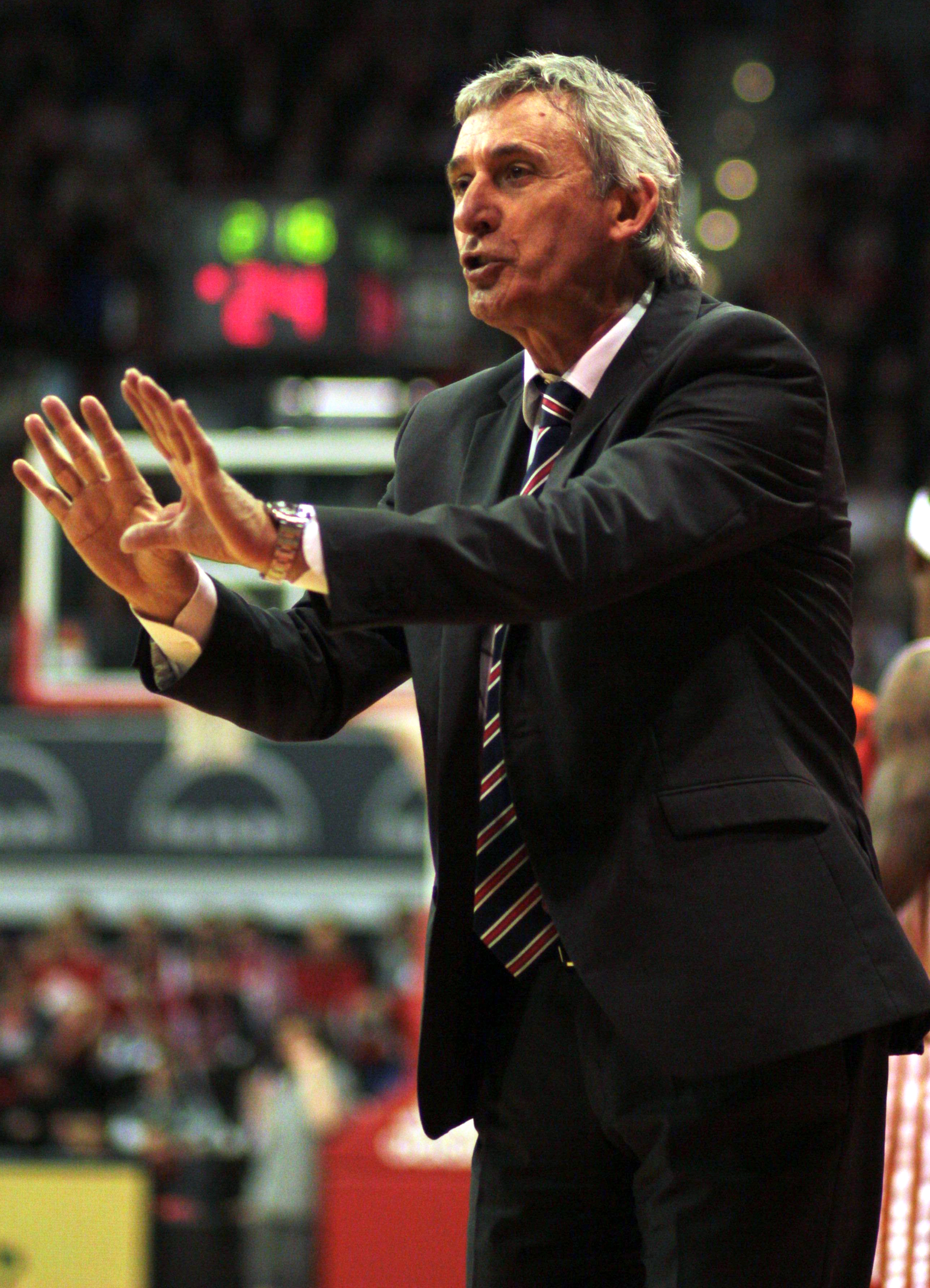
Svetislav Pešić is the only head coach to win titles with two different national teams.

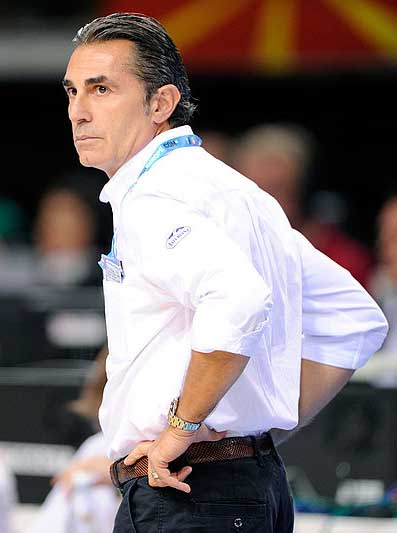
Italian coach Sergio Scariolo won four titles with the Spain national team.

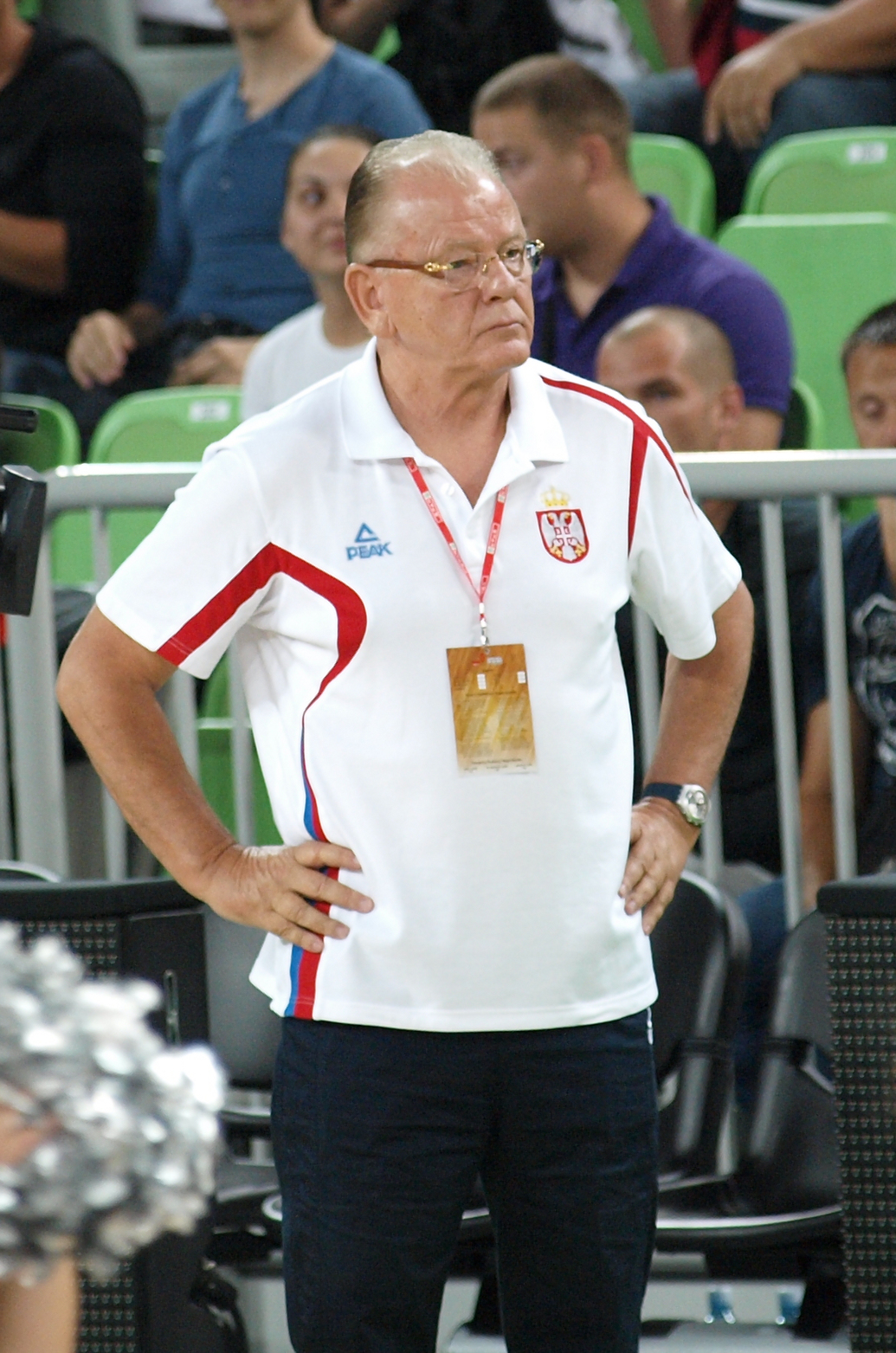
Dušan Ivković won the title three times in his career.

Year	Head coach	National team	Ref.
1935	(Latvia) Valdemārs Baumanis	Latvia	
1937	(United States) (Lithuania) Feliksas Kriaučiūnas	Lithuania	
1939	(United States) (Lithuania) Pranas Lubinas	Lithuania	
1946	(Czechoslovakia) František Hajek	Czechoslovakia	
1947	(Soviet Union) Pavel Tsetlin	Soviet Union	
1949	(Italy) Nello Paratore	Egypt	
1951	(Soviet Union) Stepan Spandaryan	Soviet Union	
1953	(Soviet Union) Konstantin Travin	Soviet Union	
1955	(Hungary) János Páder	Hungary	
1957	(Soviet Union) Stepan Spandaryan (2)	Soviet Union	
1959	(Soviet Union) Stepan Spandaryan (3)	Soviet Union	
1961	(Soviet Union) Stepan Spandaryan (4)	Soviet Union	
1963	(Soviet Union) Alexander Gomelsky† *	Soviet Union	
1965	(Soviet Union) Alexander Gomelsky† * (2)	Soviet Union	
1967	(Soviet Union) Alexander Gomelsky† * (3)	Soviet Union	
1969	(Soviet Union) Alexander Gomelsky† * (4)	Soviet Union	
1971	(Soviet Union) Vladimir Kondrashin *	Soviet Union	
1973	(Socialist Federal Republic of Yugoslavia) Mirko Novosel† *	Yugoslavia	
1975	(Socialist Federal Republic of Yugoslavia) Mirko Novosel† * (2)	Yugoslavia	
1977	(Socialist Federal Republic of Yugoslavia) Aleksandar Nikolić† *	Yugoslavia	
1979	(Soviet Union) Alexander Gomelsky† * (5)	Soviet Union	
1981	(Soviet Union) Alexander Gomelsky† * (6)	Soviet Union	
1983	(Italy) Sandro Gamba†	Italy	
1985	(Soviet Union) Vladimir Obukhov	Soviet Union	
1987	(Greece) Kostas Politis	Greece	
1989	(Socialist Federal Republic of Yugoslavia) Dušan Ivković*	Yugoslavia	
1991	(Socialist Federal Republic of Yugoslavia) Dušan Ivković* (2)	Yugoslavia	
1993	(Federal Republic of Yugoslavia) Svetislav Pešić*	Germany	
1995	(Federal Republic of Yugoslavia) Dušan Ivković* (3)	(Federal Republic of Yugoslavia) FR Yugoslavia	
1997	(Federal Republic of Yugoslavia) Željko Obradović	(Federal Republic of Yugoslavia) FR Yugoslavia	
1999	(Federal Republic of Yugoslavia) Bogdan Tanjević*	Italy	
2001	(Federal Republic of Yugoslavia) Svetislav Pešić* (2)	(Federal Republic of Yugoslavia) FR Yugoslavia	
2003	(Lithuania) Antanas Sireika	Lithuania	
2005	(Greece) Panagiotis Giannakis	Greece	
2007	(United States) (Israel) David Blatt	Russia	
2009	(Italy) Sergio Scariolo	Spain	
2011	(Italy) Sergio Scariolo (2)	Spain	
2013	(France) Vincent Collet	France	
2015	(Italy) Sergio Scariolo (3)	Spain	
2017	(Serbia) Igor Kokoškov	Slovenia	
2022	(Italy) Sergio Scariolo (4)	Spain	
2025	(Australia) (Bosnia and Herzegovina) Alan Ibrahimagić	Germany	

== Multiple winners ==
Number	Head coach	National team(s)	First	Last
6	(Soviet Union) Alexander Gomelsky	Soviet Union	1963	1981
4	(Soviet Union) Stepan Spandaryan	Soviet Union	1951	1961
4	(Italy) Sergio Scariolo	Spain	2009	2022
3	(Socialist Federal Republic of Yugoslavia) / (Federal Republic of Yugoslavia) Dušan Ivković	Yugoslavia (2), FR Yugoslavia	1989	1995
2	(Socialist Federal Republic of Yugoslavia) Mirko Novosel	Yugoslavia	1973	1975
2	(Federal Republic of Yugoslavia) Svetislav Pešić	Germany, FR Yugoslavia	1993	2001

== See also ==
- FIBA Basketball World Cup winning head coaches
- List of FIBA AfroBasket winning head coaches
- List of FIBA AmeriCup winning head coaches
- List of FIBA Asia Cup winning head coaches
