= List of FIBA AfroBasket winning head coaches =

The list of FIBA AfroBasket-winning head coaches shows all of the head coaches that have won the AfroBasket (formerly FIBA Africa Championship), which is the main international competition for senior men's basketball national teams that is governed by FIBA Africa, the African zone within the International Basketball Federation.

== Key ==
(2)	Number of titles
†	Elected into the Naismith Memorial Basketball Hall of Fame as a coach
*	Elected into the FIBA Hall of Fame
† *	Member of both the FIBA Hall of Fame and the Naismith Memorial Basketball Hall of Fame.

== List ==
Year	Head coach	National team	Ref.
1962		United Arab Republic	
1964		United Arab Republic	
1965		Morocco	
1968	(Senegal) Alioune Diop	Senegal	
1970		United Arab Republic	
1972	(Senegal) Amadou Diaw	Senegal	
1974	(Central African Republic) Laverne Grussing	Central African Republic	
1975		Egypt	
1978	(Senegal) Ibrahima Diagne	Senegal	
1980	(Senegal) Ibrahima Diagne (2)	Senegal	
1981	(Socialist Federal Republic of Yugoslavia) Vladislav Lučić	Ivory Coast	
1983	(Egypt) Fouad Abdel El-Kheir	Egypt	
1985	(Ivory Coast) Alphonse Bilé	Ivory Coast	
1987	(Central African Republic) Marcel Bimalé	Central African Republic	
1989	(Angola) Paulo Macedo	Angola	
1992	(Angola) Paulo Macedo (2)	Angola	
1993	(Angola) Paulo Macedo (3)	Angola	
1995	(Angola) Wlademiro Romero	Angola	
1997	(Senegal) Ousseynou N'Diaga Diop	Senegal	
1999	(Portugal) Mário Palma	Angola	
2001	(Portugal) Mário Palma (2)	Angola	
2003	(Portugal) Mário Palma (3)	Angola	
2005	(Portugal) Mário Palma (4)	Angola	
2007	(Angola) (Portugal) Alberto de Carvalho	Angola	
2009	(Portugal) Luís Magalhães	Angola	
2011	(Tunisia) Adel Tlatli	Tunisia	
2013	(Angola) Paulo Macedo (4)	Angola	
2015	(United States) Will Voigt	Nigeria	
2017	(Portugal) Mário Palma (5)	Tunisia	
2021	(Germany) Dirk Bauermann	Tunisia	
2025	(Portugal) Josep Clarós	Angola	

== Multiple winners ==
Number	Head coach	National team(s)	First	Last
5	(Portugal) Mário Palma	Angola, Tunisia	1999	2017
4	(Angola) Paulo Macedo	Angola	1989	2013
2	(Senegal) Ibrahima Diagne	Senegal	1978	1980

== See also ==
- FIBA Basketball World Cup winning head coaches
- List of FIBA AmeriCup winning head coaches
- List of FIBA Asia Cup winning head coaches
- List of FIBA EuroBasket winning head coaches
