= List of FIBA AmeriCup winning head coaches =

The list of FIBA AmeriCup-winning head coaches shows all of the head coaches that have won the FIBA AmeriCup, which is the main international competition for senior men's basketball national teams that is governed by FIBA Americas, the American zone within the International Basketball Federation.

== Key ==
| (2) | Number of titles |
| † | Elected into the Naismith Memorial Basketball Hall of Fame as a coach |
| * | Elected into the FIBA Hall of Fame |
| † * | Member of both the FIBA Hall of Fame and the Naismith Memorial Basketball Hall of Fame. |

== List ==
| Year | Head coach | National team | Ref. |
|---|---|---|---|
| 1980 | (Puerto Rico) Flor Meléndez | Puerto Rico | |
| 1984 | (Brazil) Renato Brito Cunha | Brazil | |
| 1988 | (Brazil) Ary Ventura Vidal | Brazil | |
| 1989 | (Puerto Rico) Armando Torres Ortiz | Puerto Rico | |
| 1992 | (United States) Chuck Daly† | United States | |
| 1993 | (United States) Mike Thibault | United States | |
| 1995 | (Puerto Rico) Carlos Morales | Puerto Rico | |
| 1997 | (United States) Morris McHone | United States | |
| 1999 | (United States) Larry Brown† | United States | |
| 2001 | (Argentina) Rubén Magnano | Argentina | |
| 2003 | (United States) Larry Brown† (2) | United States | |
| 2005 | (Brazil) Lula Ferreira | Brazil | |
| 2007 | (United States) Mike Krzyzewski† | United States | |
| 2009 | (Spain) Moncho Monsalve | Brazil | |
| 2011 | (Argentina) Julio Lamas | Argentina | |
| 2013 | (Spain) Sergio Valdeolmillos | Mexico | |
| 2015 | (Argentina) Néstor García | Venezuela | |
| 2017 | (United States) Jeff Van Gundy | United States | |
| 2022 | (Argentina) Pablo Prigioni | Argentina | |
| 2025 | (Croatia) Aleksandar Petrović | Brazil | |

== See also ==
- FIBA Basketball World Cup winning head coaches
- List of FIBA AfroBasket winning head coaches
- List of FIBA Asia Cup winning head coaches
- List of FIBA EuroBasket winning head coaches
