= FIBA Basketball World Cup winning head coaches =

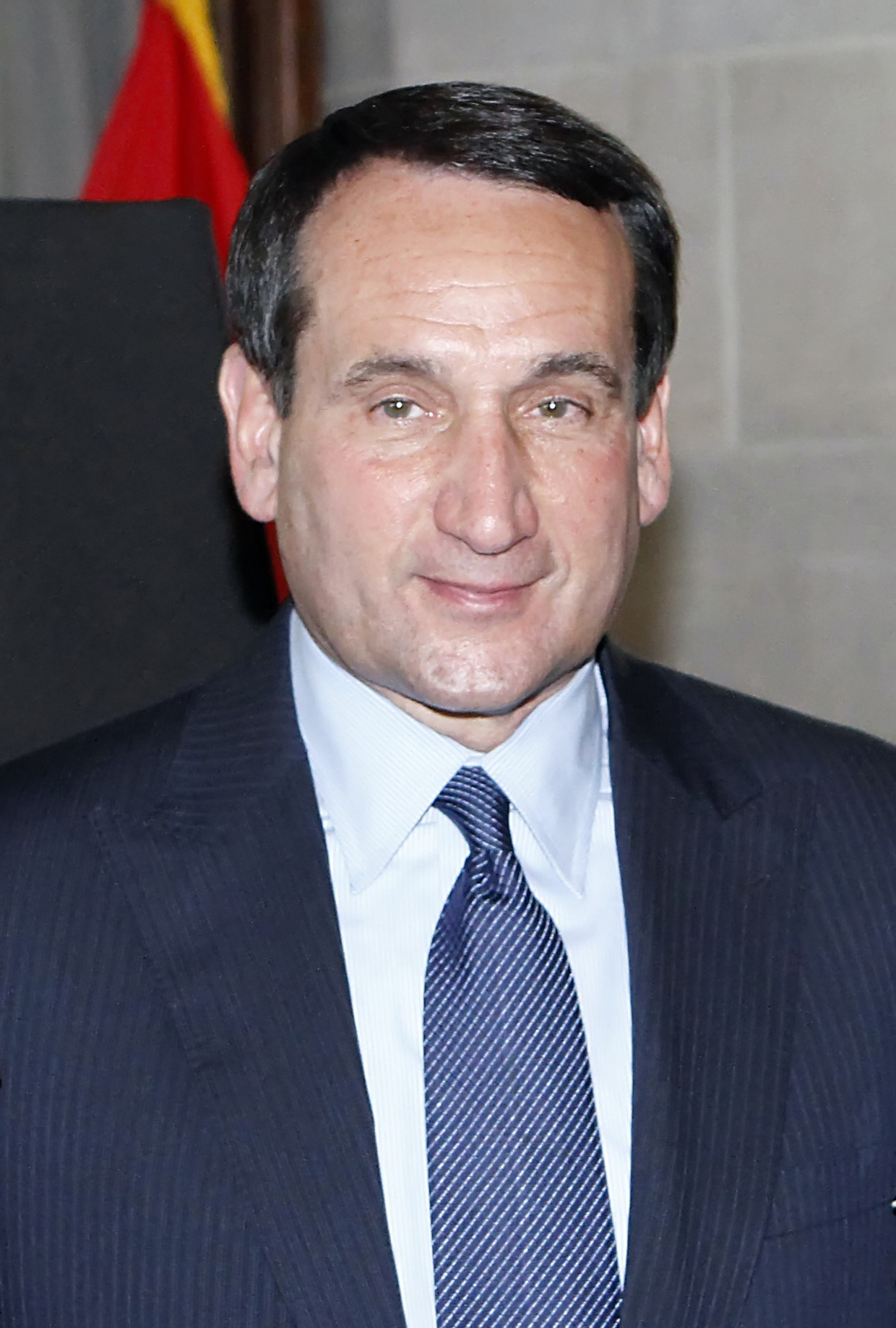
Mike Krzyzewski won the title two times in his career.

The list of FIBA Basketball World Cup winning head coaches shows all of the head coaches that have won the FIBA Basketball World Cup, which is the main international competition for senior men's basketball national teams, and that is governed by the International Basketball Federation (FIBA).

== Key ==
†	Elected into the Naismith Memorial Basketball Hall of Fame as a coach
*	Elected into the FIBA Hall of Fame
†*	Member of both the FIBA Hall of Fame and the Naismith Memorial Basketball Hall of Fame.

== List ==
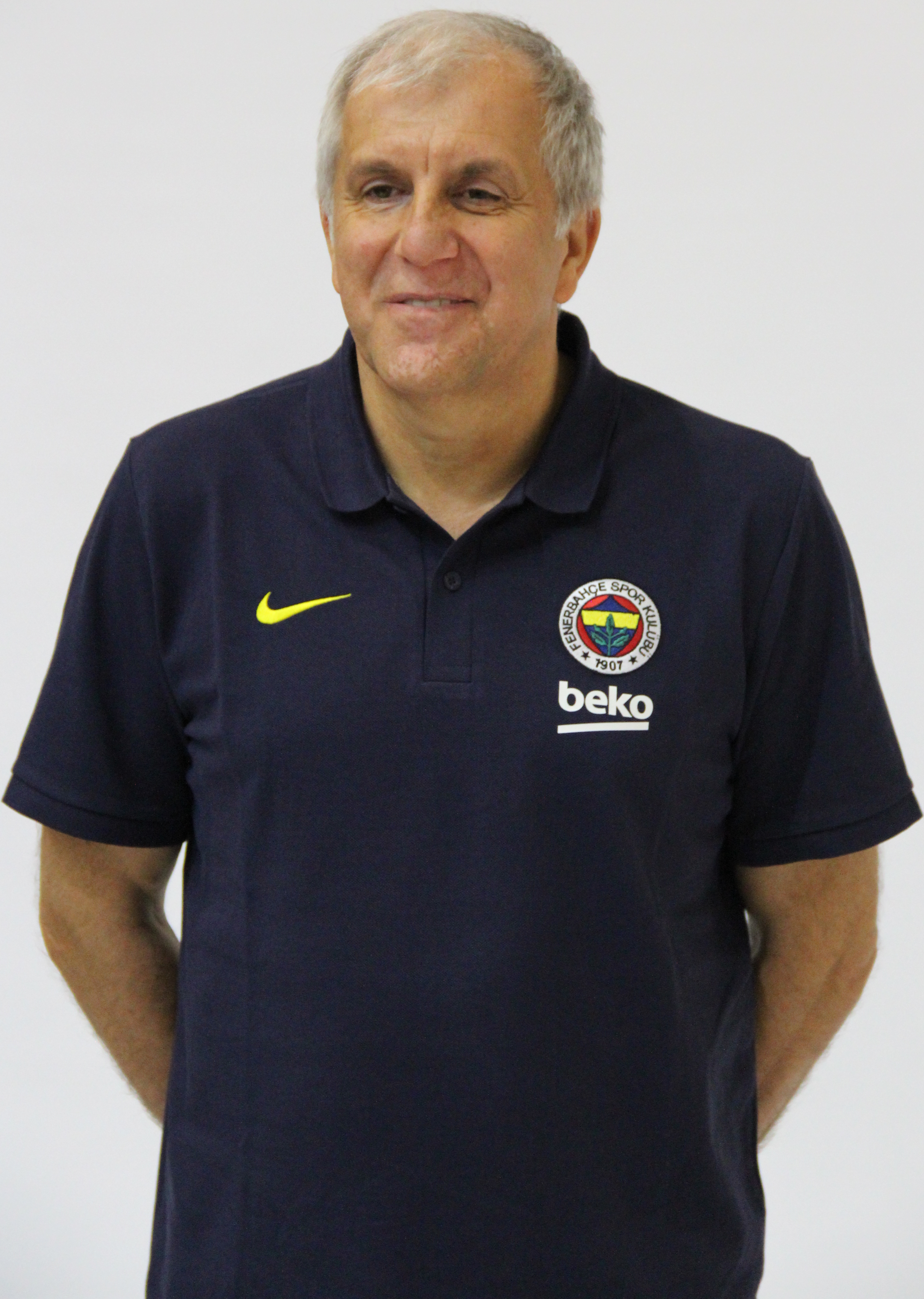
Željko Obradović won the title, both as a coach (1998) and a player (1990).

Year	Head coach	National team	Ref.
1950	(Argentina) Jorge Canavesi*	Argentina	
1954	(United States) Warren Womble	United States	
1959	(Brazil) Togo Renan Soares*	Brazil	
1963	(Brazil) Togo Renan Soares*	Brazil	
1967	(Soviet Union) Alexander Gomelsky†*	Soviet Union	
1970	(Socialist Federal Republic of Yugoslavia) Ranko Žeravica*	Yugoslavia	
1974	(Soviet Union) Vladimir Kondrashin*	Soviet Union	
1978	(Socialist Federal Republic of Yugoslavia) Aleksandar Nikolić†*	Yugoslavia	
1982	(Soviet Union) Alexander Gomelsky†*	Soviet Union	
1986	(United States) Lute Olson†	United States	
1990	(Socialist Federal Republic of Yugoslavia) Dušan Ivković*	Yugoslavia	
1994	(United States) Don Nelson†	United States	
1998	(Serbia and Montenegro) Željko Obradović	(Serbia and Montenegro) FR Yugoslavia	
2002	(Serbia and Montenegro) Svetislav Pešić*	(Serbia and Montenegro) FR Yugoslavia	
2006	(Spain) Pepu Hernández	Spain	
2010	(United States) Mike Krzyzewski†	United States	
2014	(United States) Mike Krzyzewski†	United States	
2019	(Italy) Sergio Scariolo	Spain	
2023	(Canada) (Finland) Gordon Herbert	Germany	

== Multiple winners ==
Number	Head coach	National team	First	Last
2	(Soviet Union) Alexander Gomelsky	Soviet Union	1967	1982
2	(United States) Mike Krzyzewski	United States	2010	2014
2	(Brazil) Togo Renan Soares	Brazil	1959	1963

== See also ==
- List of FIBA AfroBasket winning head coaches
- List of FIBA AmeriCup winning head coaches
- List of FIBA Asia Cup winning head coaches
- List of FIBA EuroBasket winning head coaches
