= 1967 NBA expansion draft =

Player selection draft

General information
- Sport: Basketball
- Date: May 1, 1967

Overview
- League: NBA
- Expansion teams: San Diego Rockets; Seattle SuperSonics

The 1967 NBA expansion draft was the third expansion draft of the National Basketball Association (NBA). The draft was held on May 1, 1967, so that the newly founded San Diego Rockets and Seattle SuperSonics could acquire players for the upcoming 1967–68 season. Seattle and San Diego had been awarded the expansion teams on December 20, 1966, and January 11, 1967, respectively. The Rockets moved to Houston, Texas, in 1971 and are currently known as the Houston Rockets. The SuperSonics moved to Oklahoma City, in 2008 and are currently known as the Oklahoma City Thunder. In an NBA expansion draft, new NBA teams are allowed to acquire players from the previously established teams in the league. Not all players on a given team are available during an expansion draft, since each team can protect a certain number of players from being selected. The Rockets and the Sonics selected fifteen unprotected players each, while the ten other NBA teams lost three players each.

The Rockets, the 12th franchise in the NBA, were founded by Robert Breitbard. The Rockets name was chosen because it reflects the growth of the space-age industries in the city as well as the city's theme of "a city in motion". Former Cincinnati Royals and Chicago Zephyrs head coach Jack McMahon was named as the franchise's first head coach and general manager. The Rockets' selections included three-time All-Star Johnny Green. Ten players from the expansion draft joined the Rockets for their inaugural season, but only five played more than one season for the team. Don Kojis, who played three seasons with the Rockets, was named to the 1968 All-Star Game, becoming the franchise's first All-Star.

The SuperSonics, the 11th franchise in the NBA, were founded by a group of investors led by Sam Schulman and Eugene Klein. Schulman then served as president of the team and head of operations. He hired former Chicago Bulls assistant coach Al Bianchi to become the franchise's first head coach. The Sonics' selections included six-time All-Star Richie Guerin and one-time All-Star Tom Meschery. Guerin, who was serving as the St. Louis Hawks' player-coach when the Sonics selected him, decided to retire from playing and became a full-time head coach for the Hawks. He never played for the Sonics, even though he later came back from retirement to play with the Hawks. Nine players from the expansion draft joined the Sonics for their inaugural season, but only four played more than one season for the team. Walt Hazzard, who only played one season with the Sonics, was named to the 1968 All-Star Game, becoming the franchise's first All-Star.

== Key ==
Pos.	G	F	C
Position	Guard	Forward	Center

*	Denotes player who has been selected for at least one All-Star Game and All-NBA Team
^{+}	Denotes player who has been selected for at least one All-Star Game

== Selections ==
Player	Pos.	Nationality	Team	Previous team	Years of NBA experience^{[a]}	Career with the franchise^{[b]}	Ref.
Jim Barnett	G/F	United States	San Diego Rockets	Boston Celtics	1	1967–1970	
John Barnhill	G	United States	San Diego Rockets	Baltimore Bullets	5	1967–1968	
John Block^{+}	F/C	United States	San Diego Rockets	Los Angeles Lakers	1	1967–1971	
Hank Finkel	C	United States	San Diego Rockets	Los Angeles Lakers	1	1967–1969	
Dave Gambee	F	United States	San Diego Rockets	Philadelphia 76ers	9	1967–1968	
Johnny Green^{+}	F/C	United States	San Diego Rockets	Baltimore Bullets	8	1967–1968	
Toby Kimball	F/C	United States	San Diego Rockets	Boston Celtics	1	1967–1971	
Don Kojis^{+}	F	United States	San Diego Rockets	Chicago Bulls	4	1967–1970	
Freddie Lewis	G	United States	San Diego Rockets	Cincinnati Royals	1	—^{[c]}	
Jon McGlocklin^{+}	G/F	United States	San Diego Rockets	Cincinnati Royals	2	1967–1968	
Wayne Molis	F	United States	San Diego Rockets	New York Knicks	1	—^{[c]}	
Paul Neumann	G	United States	San Diego Rockets	San Francisco Warriors	6	—^{[c]}	
Chico Vaughn	G	United States	San Diego Rockets	Detroit Pistons	5	—^{[c]}	
Gerry Ward	G	United States	San Diego Rockets	Chicago Bulls	4	—^{[c]}	
Jim Ware	F	United States	San Diego Rockets	Cincinnati Royals	1	1967–1968	
Henry Akin	F/C	United States	Seattle SuperSonics	New York Knicks	1	1967–1968	
Nate Bowman	C	United States	Seattle SuperSonics	Philadelphia 76ers	1	—^{[c]}	
Dave Deutsch	G	United States	Seattle SuperSonics	New York Knicks	1	—^{[c]}	
Richie Guerin*	G	United States	Seattle SuperSonics	St. Louis Hawks	11	—^{[c]}	
Walt Hazzard^{+}	G	United States	Seattle SuperSonics	Los Angeles Lakers	3	1967–1968	
Tommy Kron	G	United States	Seattle SuperSonics	St. Louis Hawks	1	1967–1969	
Tom Meschery^{+}	F	United States^{[d]}	Seattle SuperSonics	San Francisco Warriors	6	1967–1971	
Dorie Murrey	F/C	United States	Seattle SuperSonics	Detroit Pistons	1	1967–1970	
Bud Olsen	F/C	United States	Seattle SuperSonics	San Francisco Warriors	1	1967–1968	
Ron Reed	F	United States	Seattle SuperSonics	Detroit Pistons	2	—^{[c]}	
Rod Thorn	G	United States	Seattle SuperSonics	St. Louis Hawks	4	1967–1971	
Ben Warley	G/F	United States	Seattle SuperSonics	Baltimore Bullets	5	—^{[c]}	
Ron Watts	F	United States	Seattle SuperSonics	Boston Celtics	2	—^{[c]}	
Bob Weiss	G	United States	Seattle SuperSonics	Philadelphia 76ers	2	1967–1968	
George Wilson	C	United States	Seattle SuperSonics	Chicago Bulls	3	1967–1968	

== Notes ==
- ^{a} Number of years played in the NBA prior to the draft
- ^{b} Career with the expansion franchise that drafted the player
- ^{c} Never played a game for the franchise
- ^{d} Tom Meschery (formerly Tomislav Mescheryakov) was born in Harbin, Manchuria (now part of China) to Russian parents. He moved to the United States at the age of 8 and became a naturalized U.S. citizen.
