= Fouad Abdel Meguid El-Kheir =

Egyptian basketball player (1921–2003)

Personal information
- Nationality: Egyptian
- Born: 18 November 1921 Alexandria, Egypt
- Died: 8 January 2003 (aged 81)
- Relative: Sherif Fouad Aboulkheir (son)

Sport
- Sport: Basketball
Medal record
Men's basketball
Representing Egypt
EuroBasket
Bronze medal – third place	1947 Prague
Gold medal – first place	1949 Egypt
Mediterranean Games
Gold medal – first place	1951 Egypt

Fouad Abdel Meguid El-Kheir (Arabic: فؤاد عبد المجيد أبو الخير; 18 November 1921 – 8 January 2003) was an Egyptian basketball player. He competed in the men's tournament at the 1948 Summer Olympics and the 1952 Summer Olympics.

== See also ==
- List of FIBA AfroBasket winning head coaches
