= Sherif Fouad Aboulkheir =

Egyptian basketball player (1947–2021)

Personal information
- Full name: Ahmed Sherif Fouad Aboulkheir
- Nationality: Egyptian
- Born: 22 June 1947; Alexandria, Egypt
- Died: 27 July 2021 (aged 74); Alexandria, Egypt
- Relative: Fouad Abdel Meguid El-Kheir (father)

Sport
- Sport: Basketball
- Club: Alexandria Sporting Club

Ahmed Sherif Fouad Aboulkheir (22 June 1947 – 27 July 2021) was an Egyptian basketball player. He competed in the men's tournament at the 1972 Summer Olympics.
