= Stepan Spandaryan =

Armenian basketball player (1906–1987)

- Ստեփան Սուրենի Սպանդարյան
- Born: 2 April 1906; Tbilisi, Russian Empire
- Died: 1987 (aged 80–81); Moscow, Soviet Union
- Occupations: Basketball player, basketball coach

Stepan Surenovich Spandaryan (Armenian: Ստեփան Սուրենի Սպանդարյան, Russian: Степан Суренович Спандарян; April 2, 1906 – 1987) was a Soviet and Armenian basketball player, coach, one of the founders of the Soviet basketball. Honored Master of Sports of the USSR (1943), and Honored Coach of the USSR (1957).

== Biography ==
He was born in Tbilisi; his father, Suren Spandaryan, was a major revolutionary figure.

Since 1947, Stepan Spandaryan on coaching. In 1947 he was the assistant coach of the men's team of the USSR, won on his debut continental championship title in Europe.

In 1951–1952 and 1956–1962, he headed the coaching staff of the men's team of the USSR. During these years, the USSR national team won four times at the European Championships (1951, 1957, 1959, 1961) and three times became silver medalist of the Olympic Games (1952, 1956, 1960). In 1959, the USSR national team was close to winning the world title, but for political reasons refused to go to the match against a team from Taiwan and was disqualified.

In the 1965–1966 year, Stepan Spandaryan coached the men's team in Chile. Later he worked in the department of the Sports Committee of the USSR basketball. Over the years, he was a member and Chairman of the Presidium of the Basketball Federation of the USSR, the chairman of the All-Union Council of coaching.

He died in Moscow at the age of 81, and was buried in the Novodevichy Cemetery.

== Personal life ==
Wife - Ella Mitsis, sportswoman.

== See also ==
- List of FIBA EuroBasket winning head coaches
