= List of Oklahoma City Thunder head coaches =

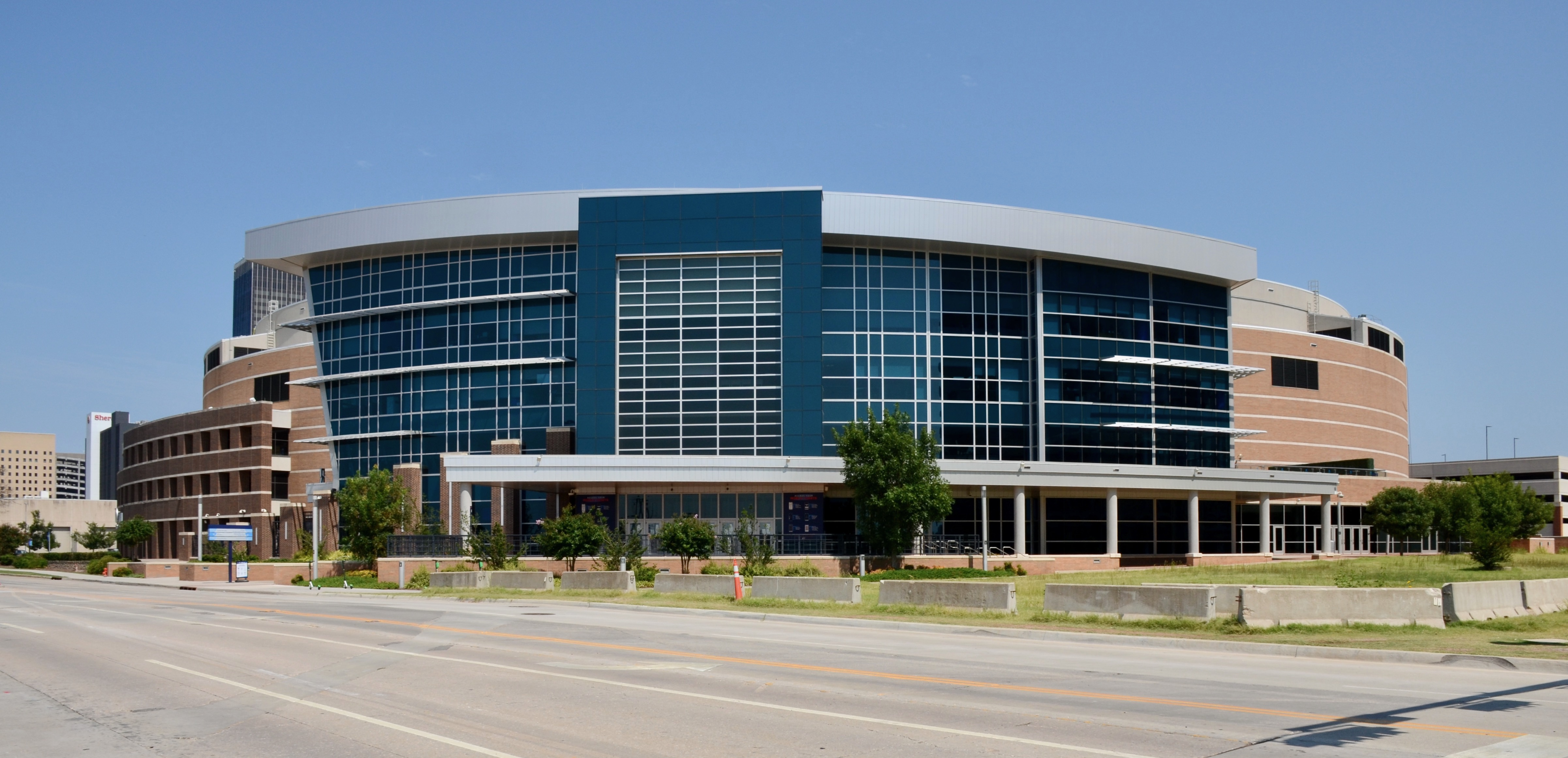
The Thunder play at the Paycom Center since the 2008–09 season.

The Oklahoma City Thunder are an American professional basketball team based in Oklahoma City. The Thunder compete in the National Basketball Association (NBA) as a member of the Northwest Division of the Western Conference. The team plays its home games at the Paycom Center. The Thunder is owned by Professional Basketball Club LLC with Sam Presti as its general manager. The team was formed in 1967 as the Seattle SuperSonics. After spending 41 seasons in Seattle, the SuperSonics moved to Oklahoma City. Owner Clay Bennett, who purchased the team in 2006, sought to get public funding for a new arena in Seattle, or a major renovation of the KeyArena in 2007. After failing to do so, he decided to move the team to Oklahoma City. Seattle sued Bennett's group to enforce the lease that required the team to stay until 2010. The two sides reached a $45 million settlement to pay off the team's lease with KeyArena in July 2008.

There have been 18 head coaches for the Thunder franchise. The franchise won its only NBA championship in the 1979 NBA Finals while coached by Hall of Famer Lenny Wilkens. Wilkens is the only member of the franchise to have been inducted into the Basketball Hall of Fame as a coach. He is also the franchise's all-time leader in regular season games coached and won, playoff games coached and won. Wilkens, Paul Westphal, Nate McMillan and Bob Weiss formerly played for the team in Seattle. Scott Brooks in 2009–10, and Mark Daigneault in 2023–24, are the only coaches to have won the NBA Coach of the Year Award with the franchise.

== Key ==
GC	Games coached
W	Wins
L	Losses
Win%	Winning percentage
#	Number of coaches
*	Spent entire NBA head coaching career with the SuperSonics/Thunder
†	Elected into the Basketball Hall of Fame as a coach

== Coaches ==
Note: Statistics are correct through the end of the 2025–26 season.

#	Name	Term	GC	W	L	Win%	GC	W	L	Win%	Achievements	Reference
#	Name	Term	Regular season				Playoffs				Achievements	Reference
Seattle SuperSonics
1	Al Bianchi	1967–1969	164	53	111	.323	0	0	0	–		
2	Lenny Wilkens†	1969–1972 (as player-coach)	246	121	125	.492	0	0	0	–	One of the top 10 coaches in NBA history	
3	Tom Nissalke	1972–1973	45	13	32	.289	0	0	0	–		
4	Bucky Buckwalter	1973	37	13	24	.351	0	0	0	–		
5	Bill Russell†	1973–1977	328	162	166	.494	15	6	9	.400		
6	Bob Hopkins*	1977	22	5	17	.227	0	0	0	–		
—	Lenny Wilkens†	1977–1985	634	357	277	.563	69	37	32	.536	NBA championship (1979)	
7	Bernie Bickerstaff	1985–1990	410	202	208	.493	27	12	15	.444		
8	K. C. Jones	1990–1992	118	59	59	.500	5	2	3	.400		
9	Bob Kloppenburg	1992	4	2	2	.500	0	0	0	–		
10	George Karl†	1992–1998	534	384	150	.719	80	40	40	.500		
11	Paul Westphal	1998–2000	147	76	71	.517	5	2	3	.400		
12	Nate McMillan	2000–2005	395	212	183	.537	16	8	8	.500		
13	Bob Weiss	2005–2006	30	13	17	.433	0	0	0	–		
14	Bob Hill	2006–2007	134	53	81	.396	0	0	0	–		
15	P. J. Carlesimo	2007–2008	82	20	62	.244	0	0	0	–		
Oklahoma City Thunder
—	P. J. Carlesimo	2008	13	1	12	.077	0	0	0	–		
16	Scott Brooks	2008–2015	545	338	207	.620	73	39	34	.534	NBA Coach of the Year (2009–10)	
17	Billy Donovan	2015–2020	400	243	157	.608	41	18	23	.439		
18	Mark Daigneault	2020–present	482	275	207	.571	58	33	15	.688	NBA Coach of the Year (2023–24); NBA championship (2025)	

== Gallery ==
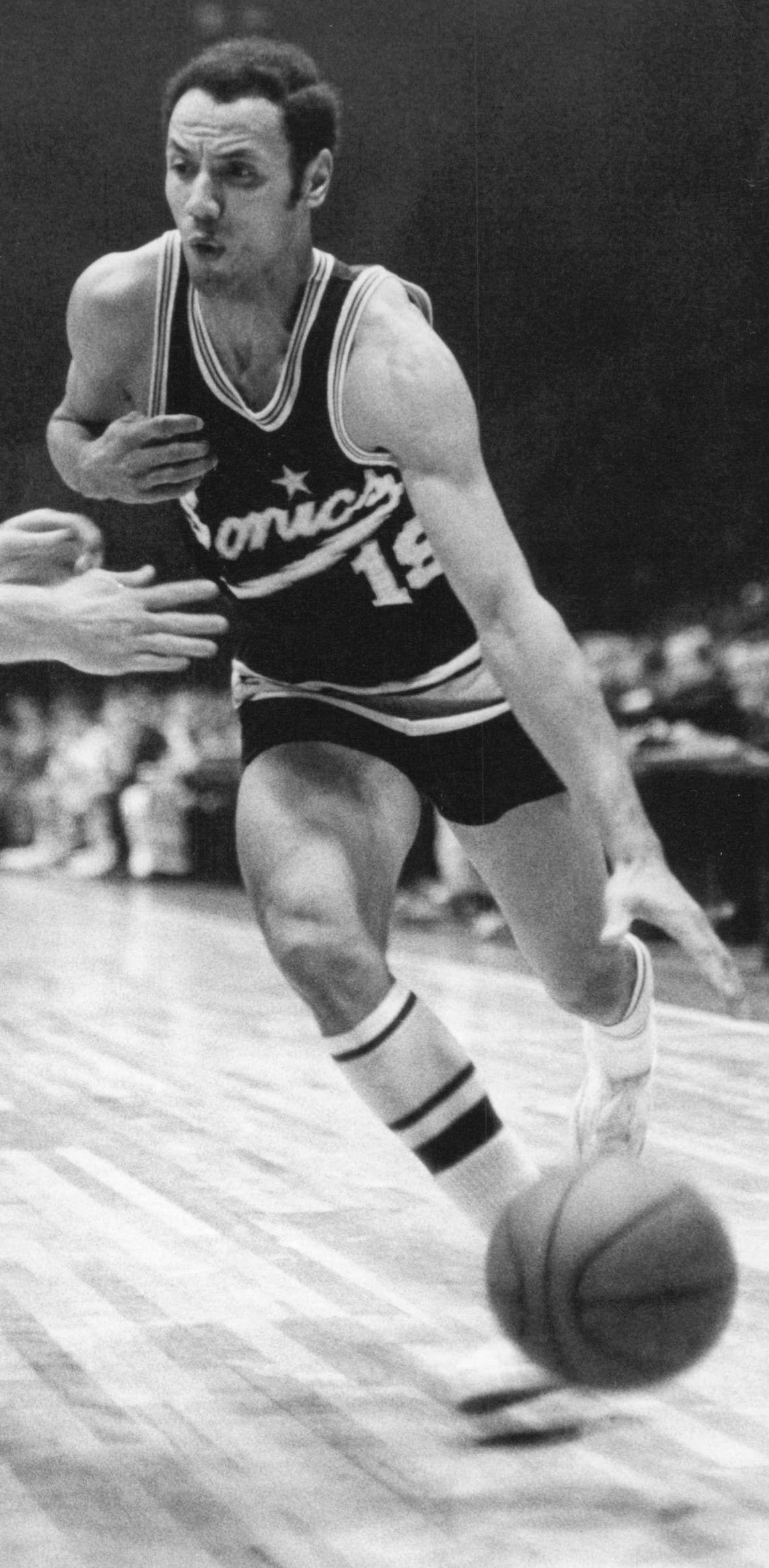
Lenny Wilkens was the head coach of the Seattle SuperSonics from 1969 to 1972 while as a player and from 1977 to 1985, and won an NBA championship in 1979.

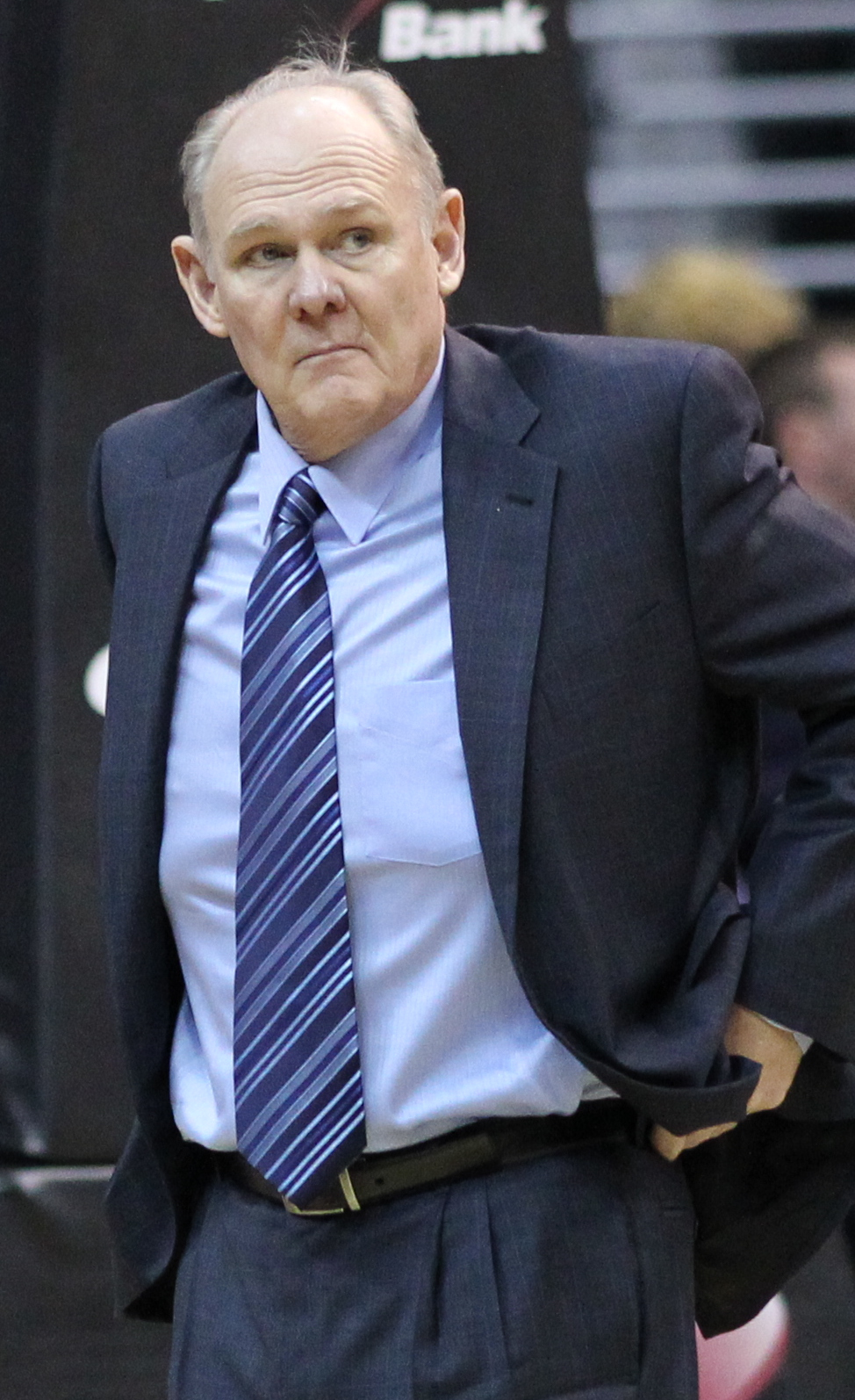
George Karl was the head coach of the Seattle SuperSonics from 1991 to 1998, and led them to their third NBA Finals in 1996.

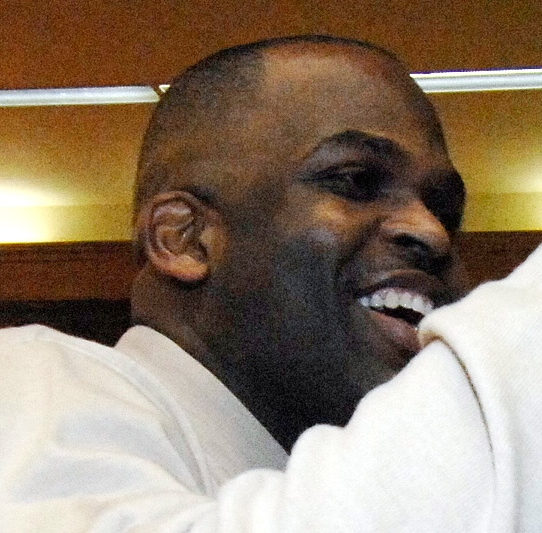
Nate McMillan was the head coach of the Seattle SuperSonics from 2000 to 2005.

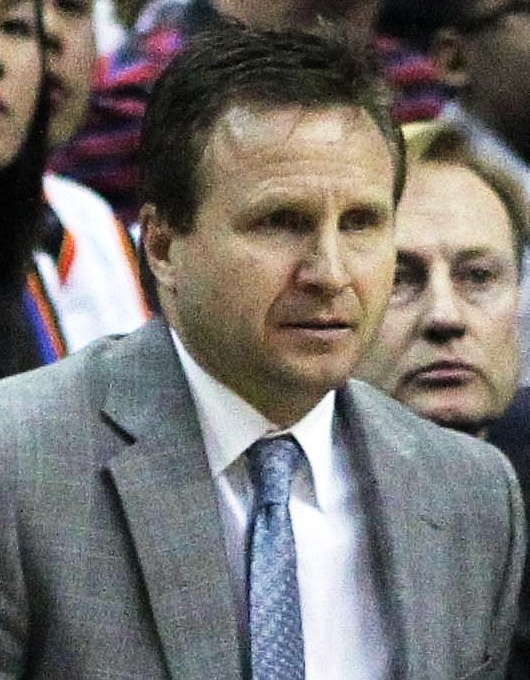
Scott Brooks was the head coach of the Oklahoma City Thunder from 2008 to 2015, and led them to their first NBA Finals in 2012.

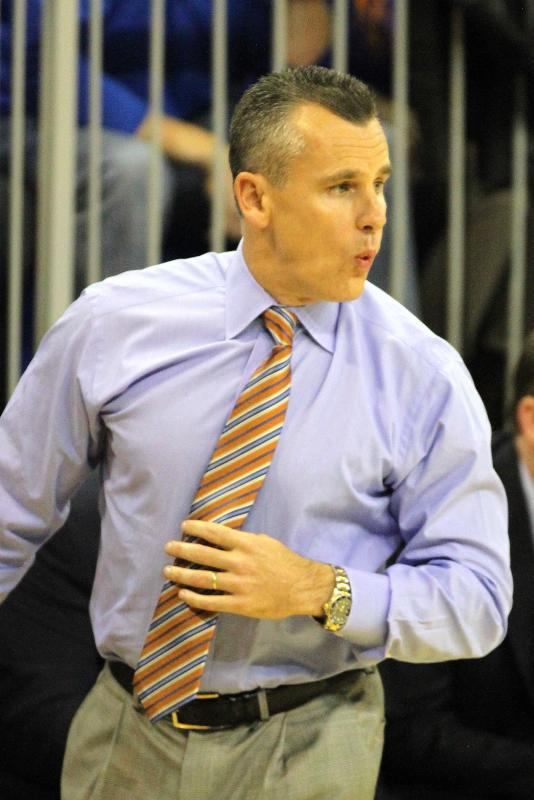
Billy Donovan was the head coach of the Oklahoma City Thunder from 2015 to 2020.
