= List of Houston Rockets head coaches =

The Houston Rockets are an American professional basketball team based in Houston. They are a member of the Southwest Division of the Western Conference in the National Basketball Association (NBA). They have played their home games at Toyota Center since 2003. Founded by Robert Breitbard in San Diego, the team first joined the NBA in 1967 as an expansion team. After four losing seasons, however, the team was sold to a group of investors based in Houston. The group subsequently relocated the team to Houston, where the Rockets have remained for 37 seasons. The franchise won its only two NBA titles in 1994 and 1995.

There have been 15 head coaches for the Houston Rockets franchise. Jack McMahon, the team's first head coach, compiled a 61–129 record during his tenure. Rudy Tomjanovich, who led the Rockets to their two championships, is the franchise's all-time leader in both regular-season and playoff games coached and wins. Alex Hannum, Tex Winter, Kevin McHale, Bill Fitch, Rudy Tomjanovich and Rick Adelman have been enshrined in the Naismith Memorial Basketball Hall of Fame. Tom Nissalke, Don Chaney and Mike D'Antoni were named Coach of the Year during their tenures as head coaches. Both Tex Winter and Johnny Egan have spent their entire NBA head coaching careers with the Rockets. Egan, Tomjanovich, and Rick Adelman formerly played for the Rockets.

== Key ==
GC	Games coached
W	Wins
L	Losses
Win%	Winning percentage
#	Number of coaches^{[a]}
*	Spent entire NBA head coaching career with the Rockets
†	Elected into the Basketball Hall of Fame as a coach

== Coaches ==
Note: Statistics are correct through the end of the 2025–26 season.

#	Name	Term^{[b]}	GC	W	L	Win%	GC	W	L	Win%	Achievements	Reference
#	Name	Term^{[b]}	Regular season				Playoffs				Achievements	Reference
San Diego Rockets
1	Jack McMahon	1967–1969	190	61	129	.321	6	2	4	.333		
2	Alex Hannum†	1969–1971	138	58	80	.420	—	—	—	—		
Houston Rockets
3	Tex Winter†*	1971–1973	129	51	78	.395	—	—	—	—		
4	Johnny Egan*	1973–1976	281	129	152	.459	8	3	5	.375		
5	Tom Nissalke	1976–1979	246	124	122	.504	14	6	8	.429	1976–77 NBA Coach of the Year	
6	Del Harris	1979–1983	328	141	187	.430	31	15	16	.484		
7	Bill Fitch†	1983–1988	410	216	194	.527	39	21	18	.538	One of the top 10 coaches in NBA history	
8	Don Chaney	1988–1992	298	164	134	.550	11	2	9	.182	1990–91 NBA Coach of the Year	
9	Rudy Tomjanovich†	1992–2003	900	503	397	.559	90	51	39	.567	2 NBA championships (1994, 1995)	
10	Jeff Van Gundy	2003–2007	328	182	146	.555	19	7	12	.368		
11	Rick Adelman†	2007–2011	328	193	135	.588	19	9	10	.474	4th longest winning streak in NBA history	
12	Kevin McHale	2011–2015	323	193	130	.598	29	13	16	.448		
13	J. B. Bickerstaff	2015–2016	71	37	34	.521	5	1	4	.200		
14	Mike D'Antoni	2016–2020	318	217	101	.682	51	28	23	.549	2016–17 NBA Coach of the Year	
15	Stephen Silas*	2020–2023	236	59	177	.250	—	—	—	—		
16	Ime Udoka	2023–present	246	145	101	.589	13	5	8	.385		

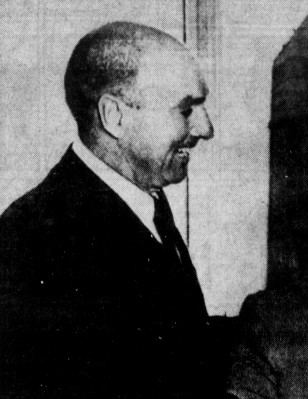
Alex Hannum was the coach for the Rockets from 1969 to 1971.

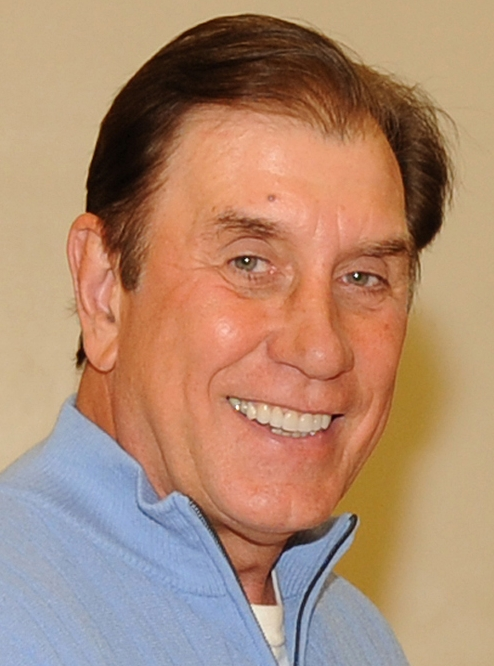
Rudy Tomjanovich led the Rockets to back-to-back NBA championships in 1994 and 1995.

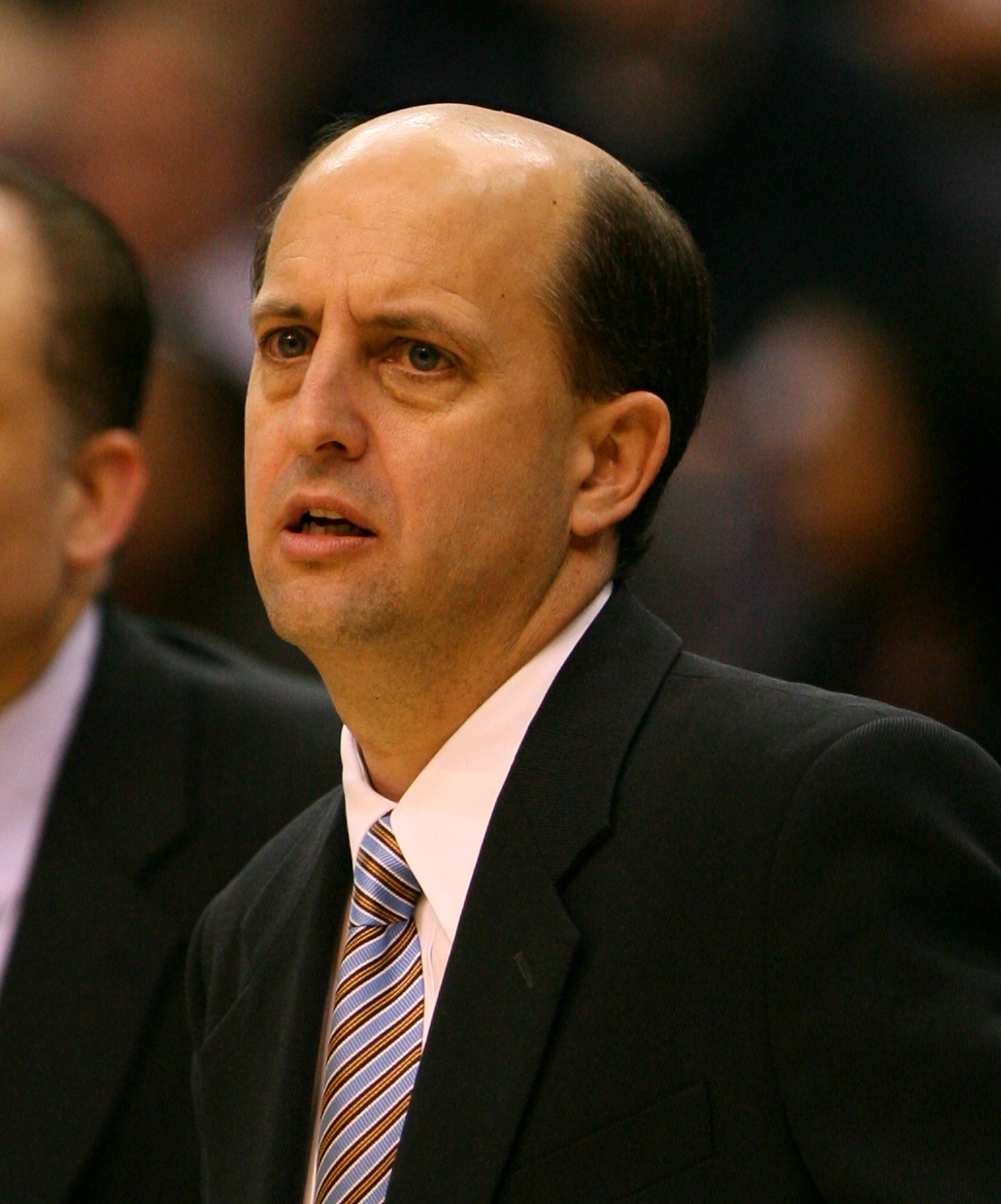
Jeff Van Gundy was the coach for the Rockets from 2003 to 2007.

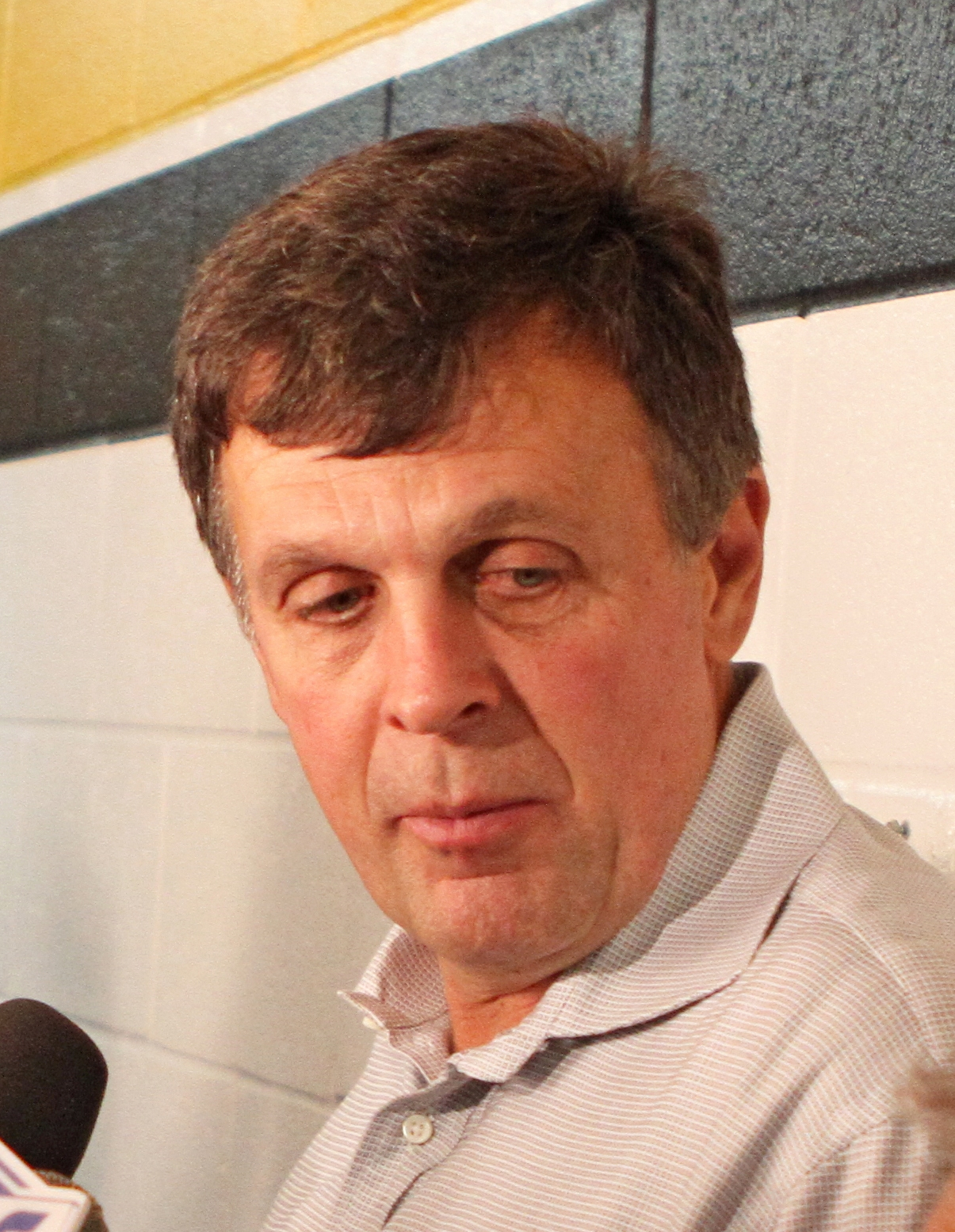
Kevin McHale was the head coach of the Rockets from 2011 to 2015.

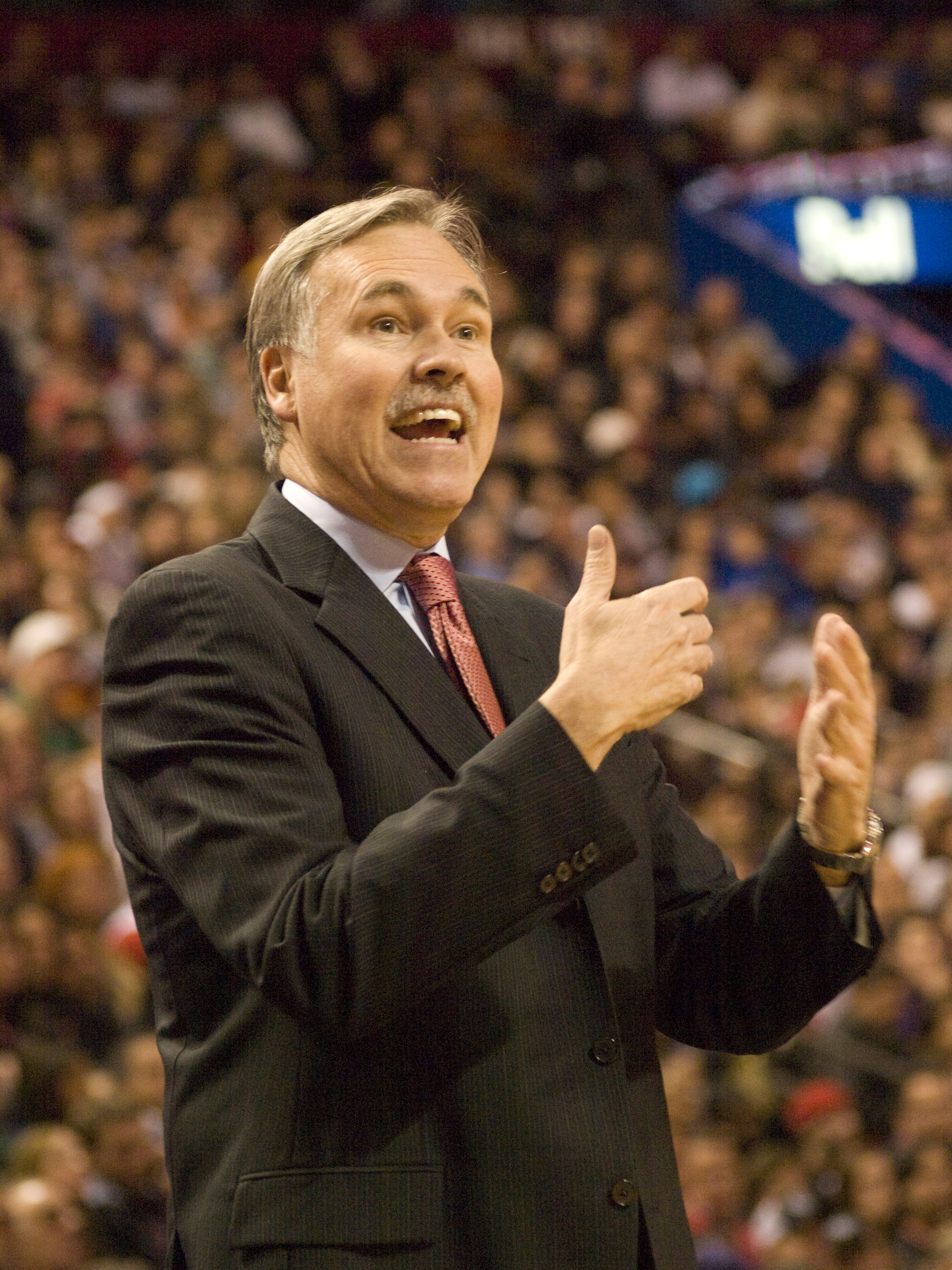
Mike D'Antoni was the head coach of the Rockets from 2016 to 2020.

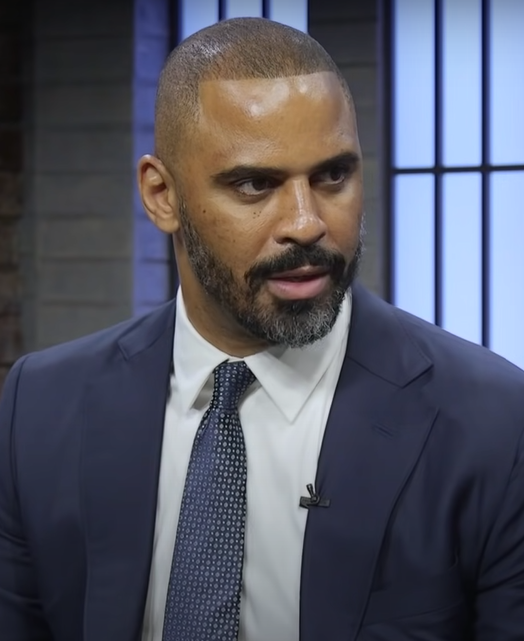
Ime Udoka is the current head coach of the Rockets since 2023.

== Notes ==
- ^{a} A running total of the number of coaches of the Rockets. Thus, any coach who has two or more separate terms as head coach is only counted once.
- ^{b} Each year is linked to an article about that particular NBA season.
