= Jiang Xingquan =

Chinese basketball player and coach

Jiang Xingquan 蒋兴权
Personal information
- Born: June 5, 1940 (age 86) Xingcheng, Liaoning, China
- Listed height: 6 ft 2 in (1.88 m)
- Coaching career: 1970–2022

Career history

Playing
- 1960–1970: Liaoning

Coaching
- 1970–1990: Liaoning
- 1991–1995: China
- 1999–2000: China
- 2002–2004: Xinjiang Flying Tigers
- 2003: China
- 2004–2006: Liaoning Panpan
- 2006–2007: Zhejiang Wanma Cyclone
- 2008–2011: Xinjiang Flying Tigers
- 2013–2015: Foshan Dralions
Medals
Head coach for China
men's national basketball team
FIBA Asia Championship
Gold medal – first place	1991 Kobe
Gold medal – first place	1993 Jakarta
Gold medal – first place	1995 Seoul
Gold medal – first place	1999 Fukuoka
Gold medal – first place	2003 Harbin
Asian Games
Gold medal – first place	1994 Hiroshima

Jiang Xingquan (Chinese: 蒋兴权; pinyin: Jiǎng Xīngquán; born 5 June 1940) is a retired Chinese professional basketball player and coach. He is the current consultant to head coach of Liaoning Flying Leopards in the Chinese Basketball Association (CBA). He is considered one of the most famous Chinese basketball coach, and is known for his strict rules and ability to promote young players.

== Playing career ==
Jiang graduated in 1958 from Shenyang Sport University. Between 1960 and 1970, he played for the Liaoning basketball team, and stepped up as the team's head coach in 1970.

== Coaching career ==
=== Clubs ===
Jiang was appointed by the Xinjiang Flying Tigers in 2002 in the second tier league. He led the team to promote into the Chinese Basketball Association. The team ranked fifth both in 2002−03 and 2003−04 seasons as rookie team.

He moved to side with his hometown team Liaoning Panpan in 2004, and managed for two seasons. For the 2004−05 season, Liaoning ranked top in the north division.

In 2006, he joined Zhejiang Wanma Cyclones, and helped the team entering the playoffs.

In 2007, Jiang returned to Xinjiang. This time the team made impressive progress, entering CBA finals for 3 consecutive seasons since 2008. He was sacked in 2011, but re-appeared shortly as the interim coach later that year.

In 2013, Jiang moved to Guangdong to join Foshan Dralions until 2015.

In 2017, he was appointed as the consultant of Zhejiang Golden Bulls.

In 2020, he returned to Liaoning as consultant.

=== National team ===
In 1990, Jiang became the head coach of China men's national basketball team. From 1991 through 1995, the team won 3 ABC Championships, and had impressive performance in the 1994 FIBA World Championship, entering quarter-finals, which was the best result among China national team's history, and was considered the best achievement in his national team coaching career. In 1999, Jiang returned to Chinese men's basketball team, and won his fourth FIBA Asian Cup as the head coach. However, the team did not perform well in the 2000 Sydney Olympics, which led to his resignation. He returned shortly in 2003, and again won his fifth Asian title.
