= FIBA Hall of Fame =

Hall of fame in Switzerland

Coordinates: 40.5361°N 3.6352°W

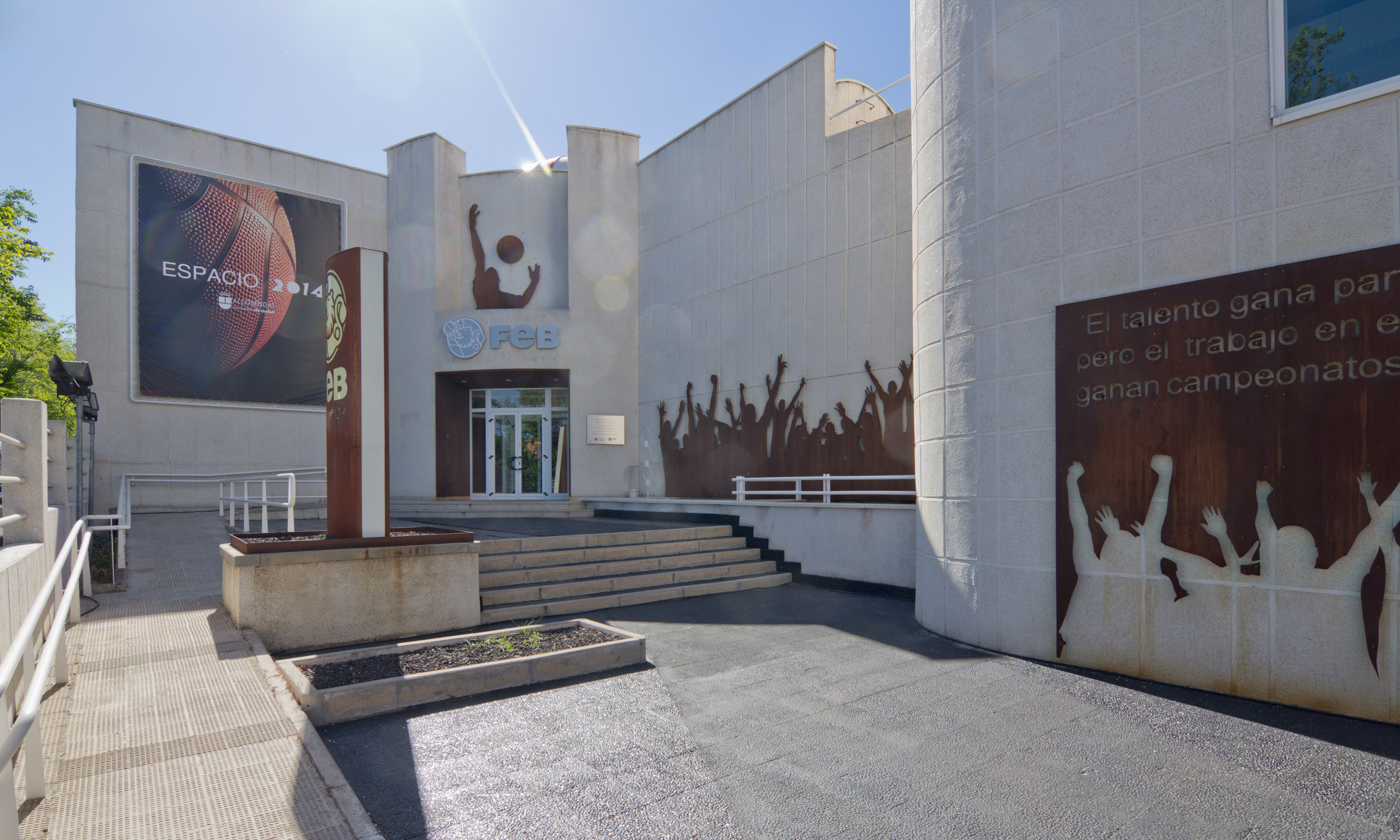
- The exterior of the former FIBA Hall of Fame location.
- Established: 1991
- Location: Mies, Nyon District, Switzerland
- Type: Hall of Fame
- President: Sheikh Saud Ali al Thani
- Website: Official website

The FIBA Hall of Fame, or FIBA Basketball Hall of Fame, honors players, coaches, teams, referees, and administrators who have greatly contributed to international competitive basketball. It was established by FIBA in 1991 and is currently located in Mies, Switzerland. Originally built in Alcobendas, Community of Madrid, Spain, by the Pedro Ferrándiz Foundation, it included the "Samaranch Library", the largest basketball library in the world with an estimated 10,000 basketball books and 950 magazines from over 65 countries. After ratification from the Central Board, it moved to the new FIBA headquarters as part of The Patrick Baumann House of Basketball after its construction was completed in 2013.

Initially, induction ceremonies occurred every two years, with the first one taking place in 2007. The pattern was interrupted in 2010, when a class was inducted on the day of the 2010 FIBA World Championship's Final in Istanbul. After that, no induction took place until 2013, with a class announced in May of that year, with induction taking place on 19 June. The next induction class was in 2015, and after that, more classes were inducted in 2016, 2017, and 2019.

== See also ==
- FIBA Order of Merit
- FIBA's 50 Greatest Players (1991)
- Naismith Memorial Basketball Hall of Fame
  - List of members of the Naismith Memorial Basketball Hall of Fame
  - List of players in the Naismith Memorial Basketball Hall of Fame
  - List of coaches in the Naismith Memorial Basketball Hall of Fame
- College Basketball Hall of Fame
- Women's Basketball Hall of Fame
- EuroLeague Hall of Fame
- Italian Basketball Hall of Fame
- Greek Basketball League Hall of Fame
- VTB United League Hall of Fame
- French Basketball Hall of Fame
- Australian Basketball Hall of Fame
- Finnish Basketball Hall of Fame
- Philippine Basketball Association Hall of Fame
