= List of coaches in the Naismith Memorial Basketball Hall of Fame =

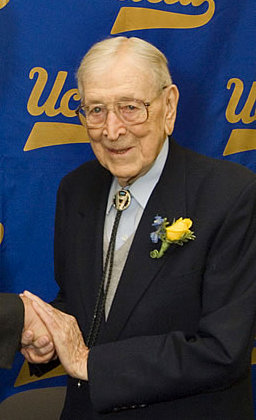
John Wooden, inducted as player in 1960 and as a coach in 1973, the FIRST person so inducted.

The Naismith Memorial Basketball Hall of Fame honors players who have shown exceptional skill at basketball, all-time great coaches, referees, and other major contributors to the sport. Located in Springfield, Massachusetts, the Basketball Hall of Fame is named after James Naismith, who invented the sport in 1891; he was inducted into the Hall as a contributor in 1959. The Coach category has existed since the beginning of the Hall of Fame. For a person to be inducted to the Basketball Hall of Fame as a coach, they must either be "fully retired for five years" or, if they are still active, "have coached as either a fulltime assistant or head coach on the high school and/or college and/or professional level" for 25 years.

As part of the inaugural class of 1959, three coaches were inducted (Forrest C. "Phog" Allen, Henry Clifford Carlson and Walter E. Meanwell); in total, 100 individuals have been inducted into the Hall of Fame as coaches.

Seven coaching inductees were associated with teams that were inducted to the Hall of Fame as units. Don Haskins, inducted in 1997, was the coach of the 1966 Texas Western basketball team, which was inducted in 2007. Dutch Lonborg, inducted in 1973, was manager of the 1960 U.S. Olympic team that was inducted in 2010. Three coaching inductees were members of the staff for the 1992 U.S. Olympic team that was also inducted in 2010—head coach Chuck Daly (1994) and assistants Lenny Wilkens (1998) and Mike Krzyzewski (2001). Head coach Krzyzewski and assistant Jim Boeheim (2005) were also inducted as part of the 2008 U.S. Olympic team in 2025. Cathy Rush (2008) was the head coach of the Immaculata College women's team of 1972–1974 that was inducted in 2014.

Ten of the inducted coaches were born outside the United States: Cesare Rubini, Aleksandr J. Gomelsky, Antonio Díaz-Miguel, Aleksandar "Aza" Nikolić, Geno Auriemma, Alessandro "Sandro" Gamba, Mirko Novosel, Pedro Ferrándiz, Lidia Alexeeva, and Lindsay Gaze. Ten of the inducted coaches are women: L. Margaret Wade, Jody Conradt, Pat Head Summitt, Sandra Kay Yow, Sue Gunter, Rush, C. Vivian Stringer, Tara VanDerveer, Alexeeva, and Sylvia Hatchell. Five coaches have also been inducted as players: John Wooden, Bill Sharman, Wilkens, Tom Heinsohn, and Bill Russell. One of the more recent inductees in this category was John McLendon, who was inducted as a head coach in 2016. McLendon had also been inducted as a contributor in 1979, making him the first individual ever to be inducted as both a coach and contributor.

Unlike recent years (such as 2015), in which individuals directly elected by special Hall committees were announced separately from the rest of the class, all 2016 inductees were announced at the same event. Specifically, the announcement of the class of 2016 was made on April 4 during the festivities surrounding the 2016 NCAA Men's Final Four in Houston.

== Coaches ==
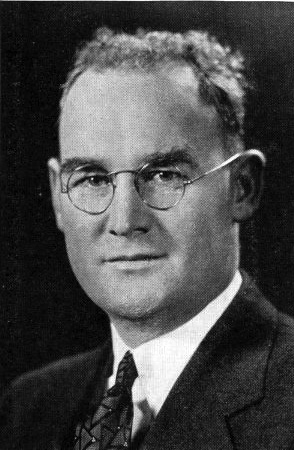
Clifford Carlson, inducted in 1959

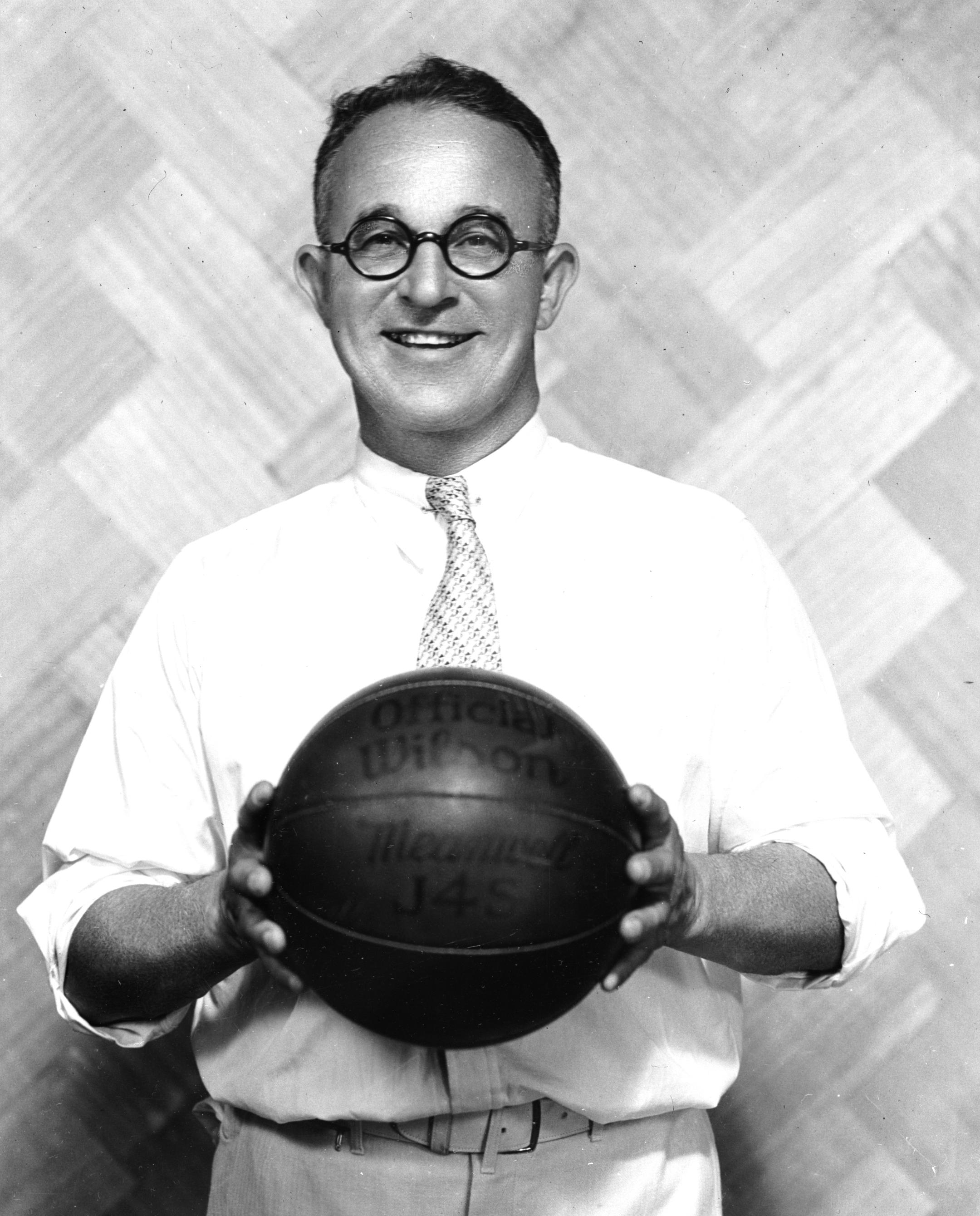
Walter Meanwell, inducted in 1959

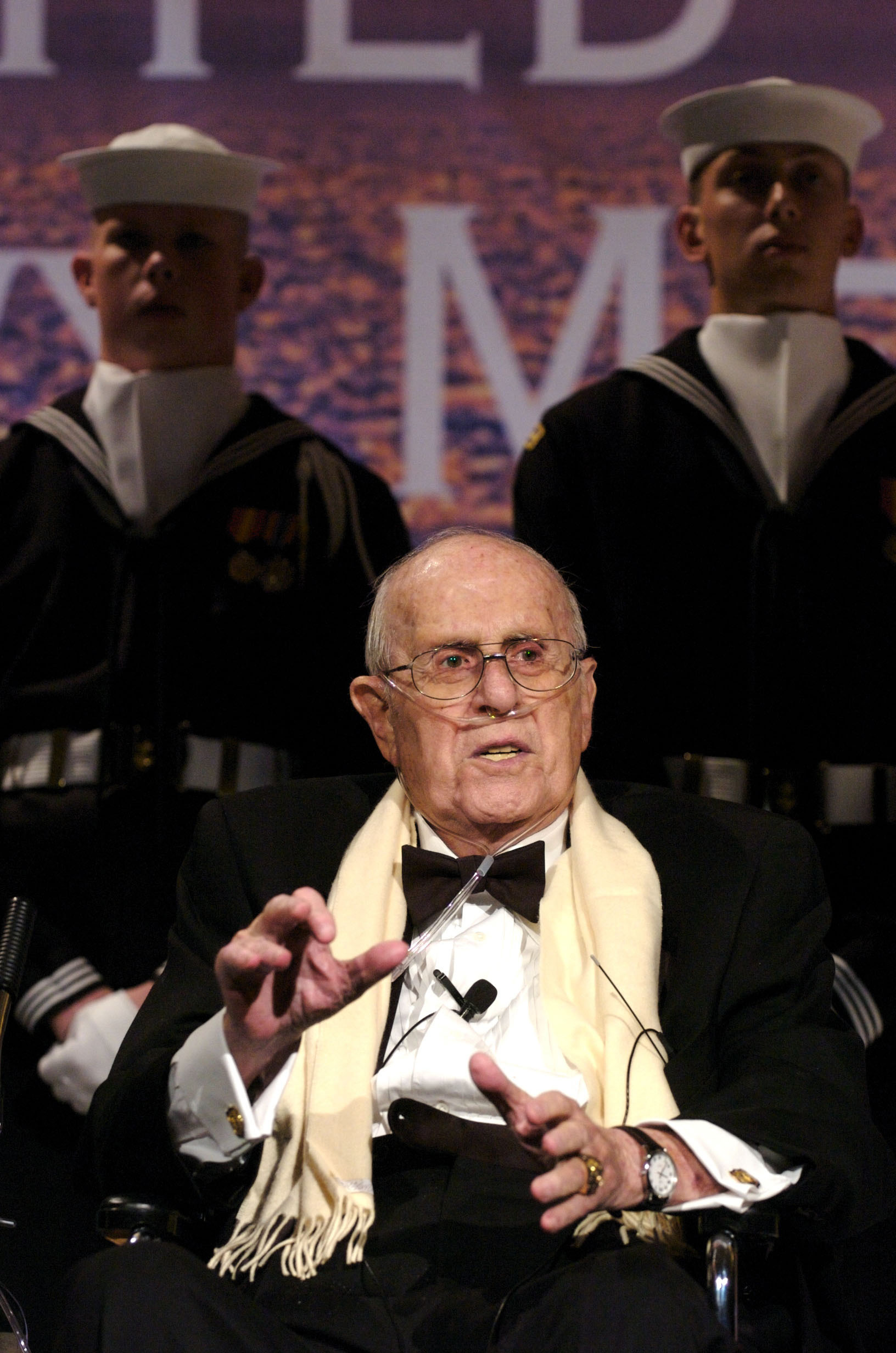
Red Auerbach, inducted in 1969

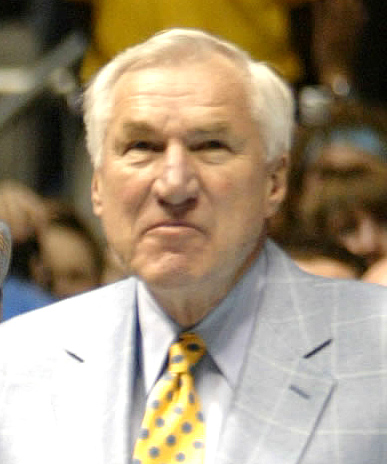
Dean Smith, inducted in 1983

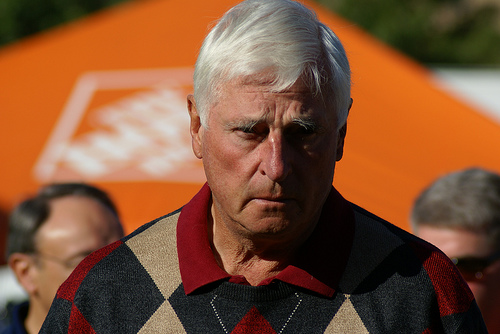
Bob Knight, inducted in 1991

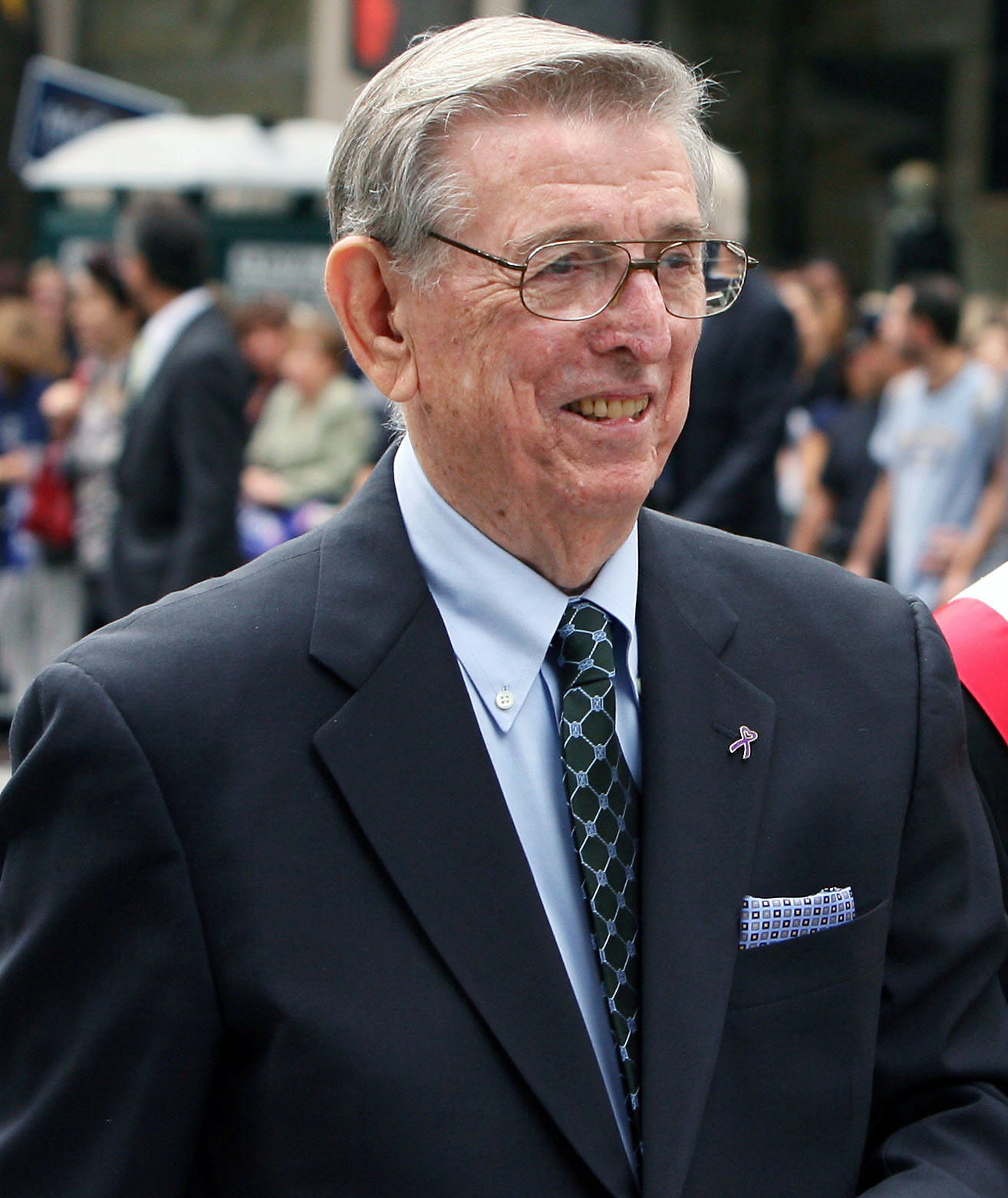
Lou Carnesecca, inducted in 1992

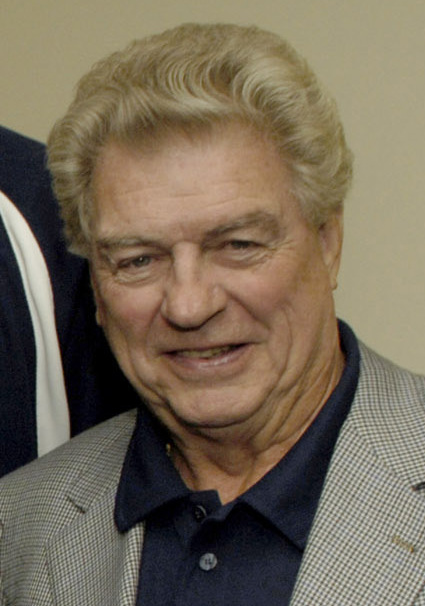
Chuck Daly, inducted in 1994

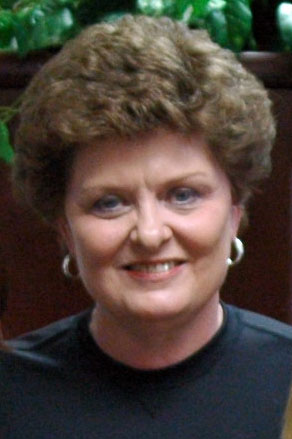
Jody Conradt, inducted in 1998

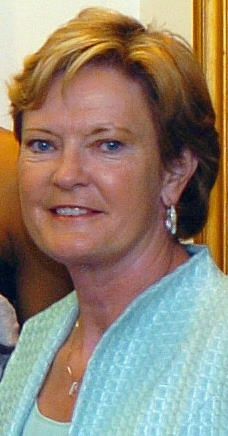
Pat Summitt, inducted in 2000

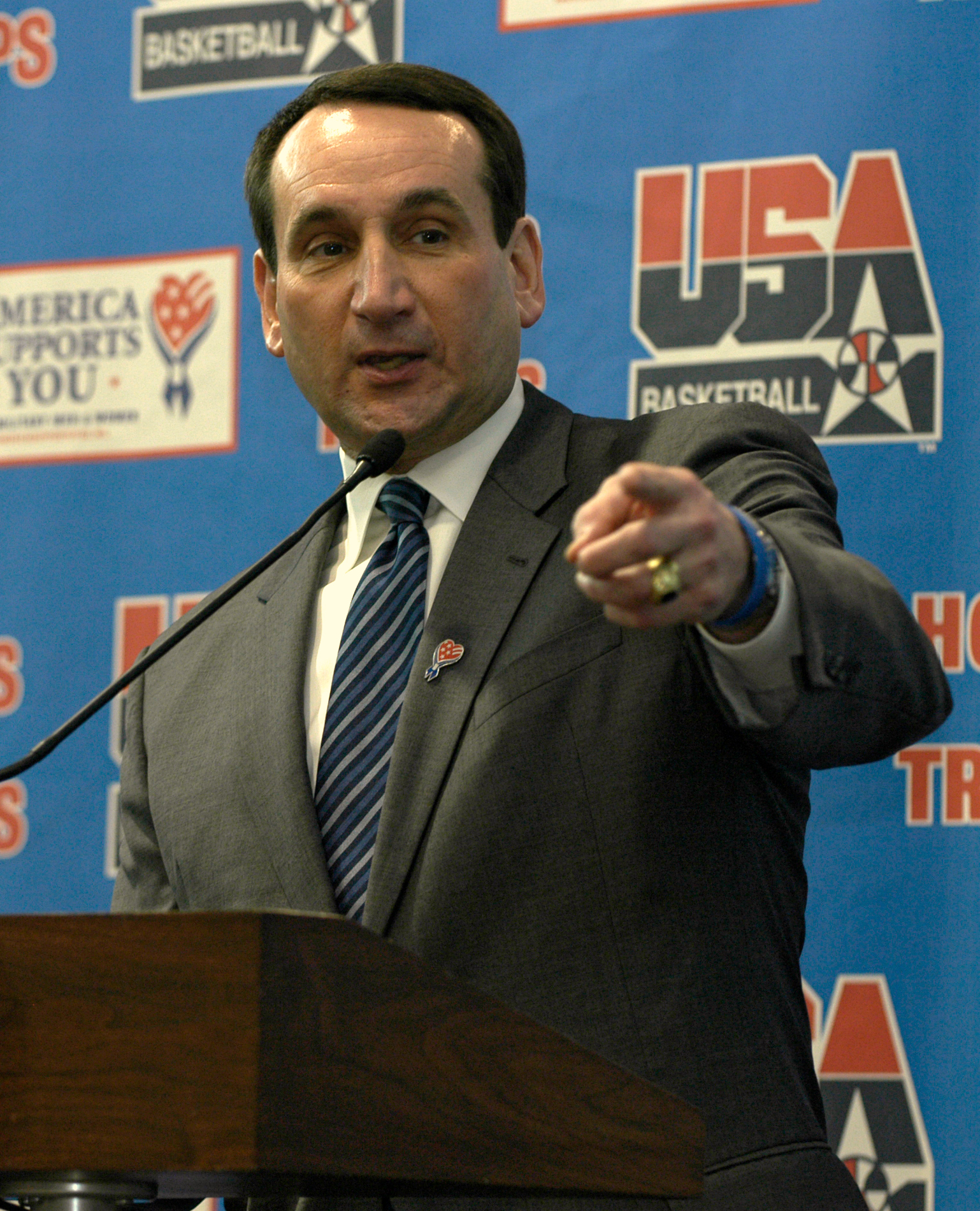
Mike Krzyzewski, inducted in 2001

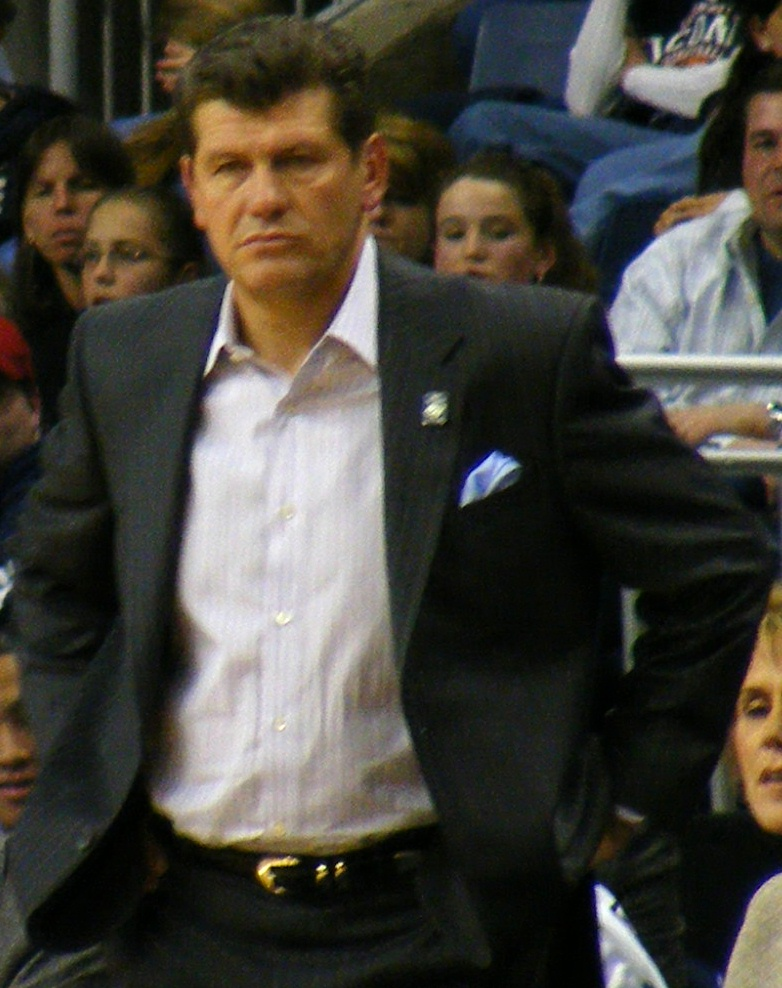
Geno Auriemma, inducted in 2006

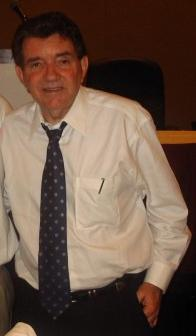
Van Chancellor, inducted in 2007

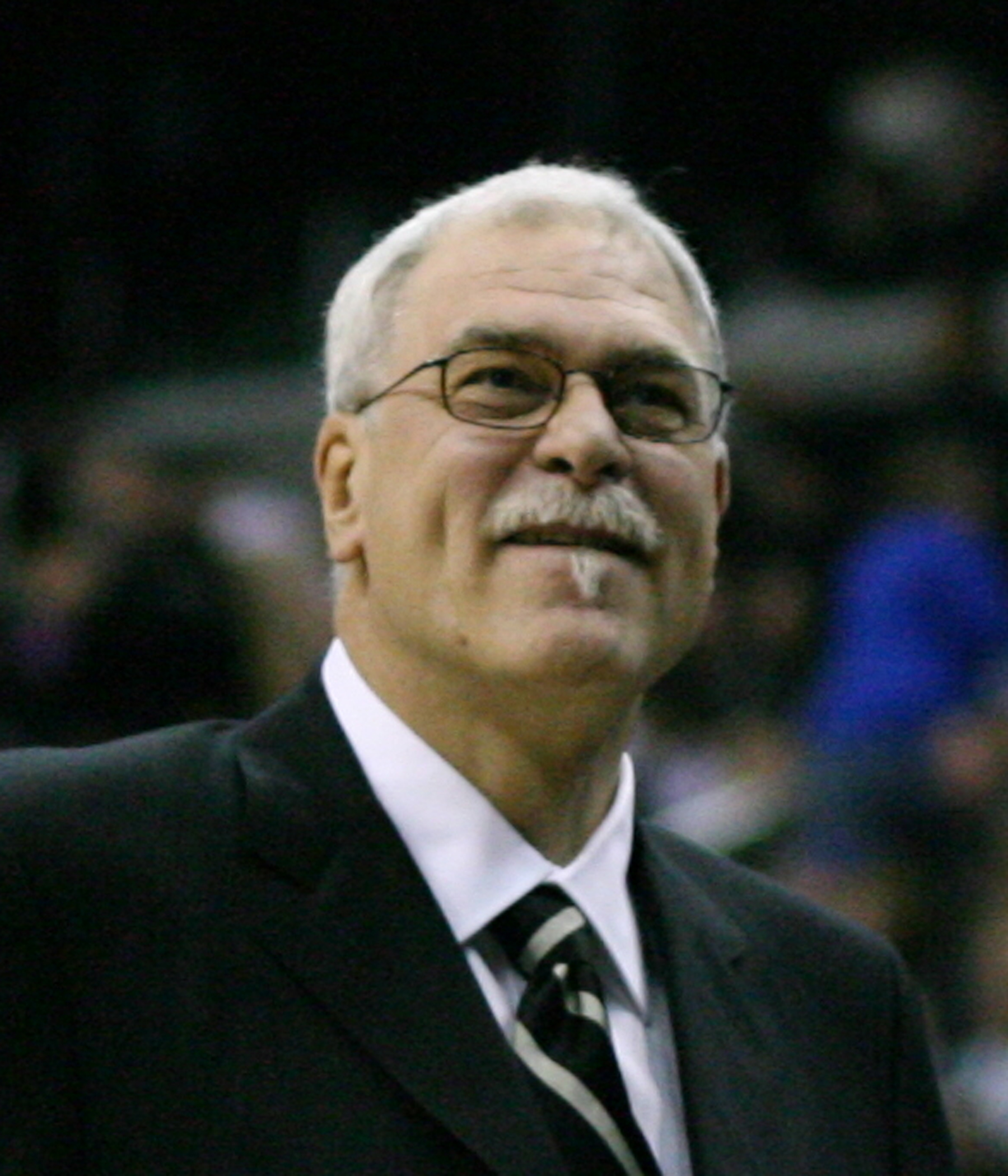
Phil Jackson, inducted in 2007

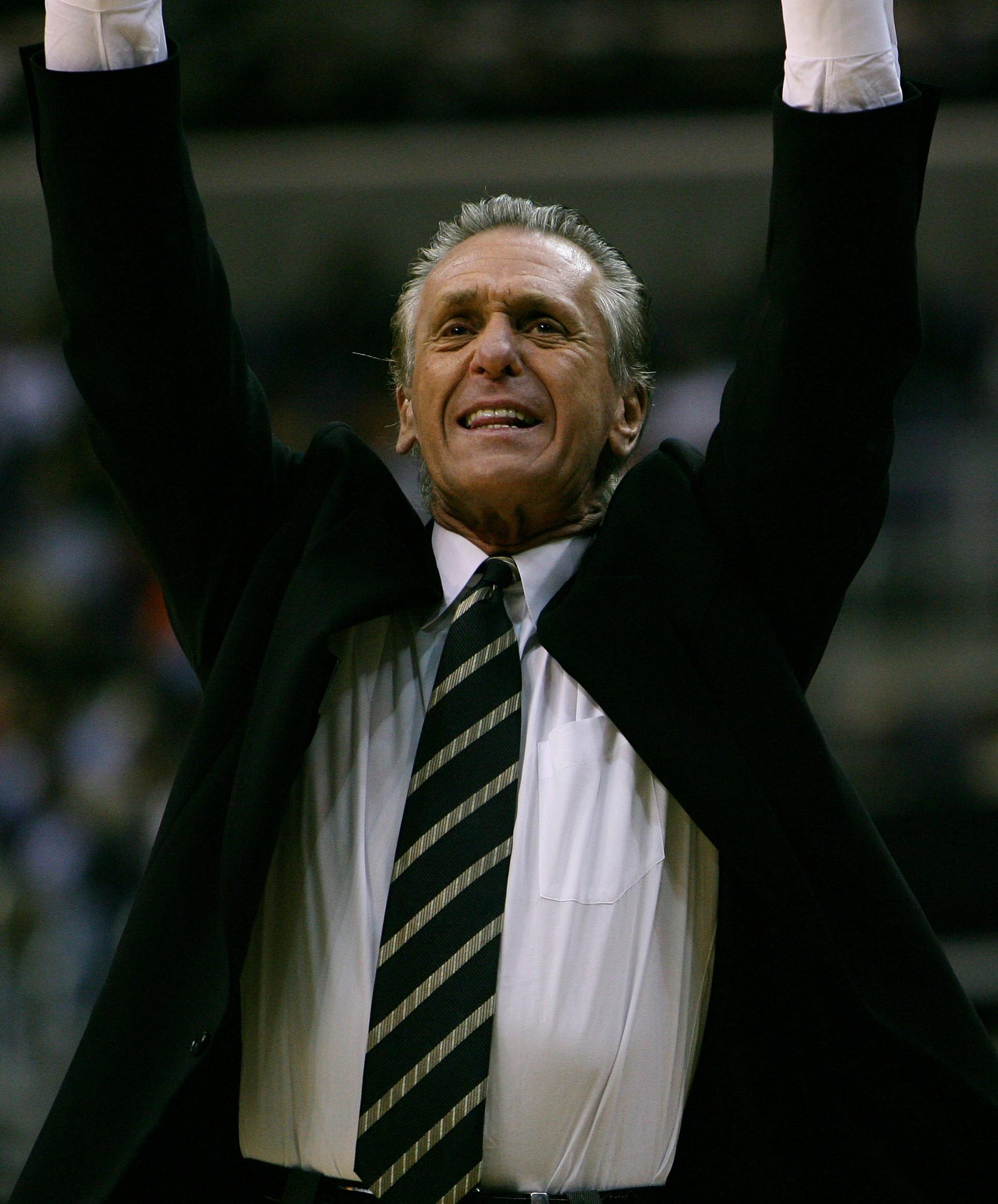
Pat Riley, inducted in 2008

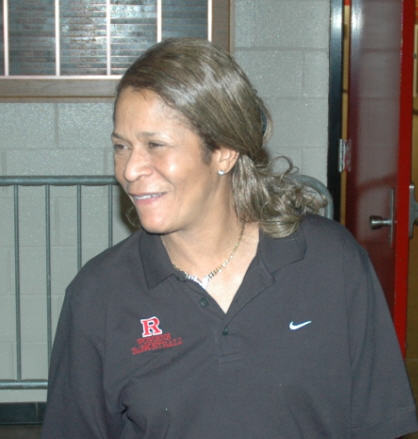
C. Vivian Stringer, inducted in 2009

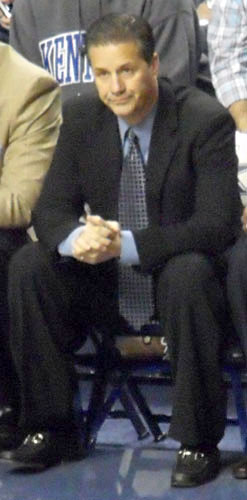
John Calipari, inducted in 2015

Year	Inductees^{[a]}	Achievements^{[b]}	Ref.
1959	(United States) Phog Allen	Two Helms Foundation championships (Kansas, 1922, 1923); Founder of the National Association of Basketball Coaches (NABC) and the National Collegiate Athletic Association (NCAA) championship. National Association of Basketball Coaches (NABC) National Coach of the Year (1950); NCAA Tournament Champion (Kansas, 1952); 26 regular season conference championships. Responsible for basketball being accepted as an Olympic sport (1936). Olympic gold medal winner (Helsinki, 1952). 746 career wins. Known as "The Father of Basketball Coaching."	
1959	(United States) Doc Carlson	Created Figure 8 offense in 1922; Helms Foundation championship (Pittsburgh; 1928, 1930)	
1959	(United States) Walter Meanwell	Three Helms Foundation championships (Wisconsin, 1912, 1914, 1916); Eight Big Ten Conference championships (Wisconsin; 1912–14, 1916, 1921, 1923–24, 1929); charter member of National Basketball Coaches Association	
1960	(United States) Ernest Blood	Coached Passaic High School to a high school record 159-game winning streak and seven high school state championships; five prep-school state championships (St. Benedict's)	
1960	(United States) Frank Keaney	Led University of Rhode Island to four National Invitation Tournament (NIT) berths; University of Rhode Island Gymnasium dedicated in his honor in 1953; first coach to be signed by the Boston Celtics	
1960	(United States) Ward Lambert	11 Big Ten Conference championships (Purdue); Helms Foundation championship (Purdue, 1932); inducted into Helms Foundation Hall of Fame; Most Outstanding Coach by Esquire (1945)	
1961	(United States) George Keogan	Two Helms Foundation championships (Notre Dame; 1927, 1936)	
1961	(United States) Lenny Sachs	Amateur Athletic Union (AAU) championship (Illinois Athletic Club, 1917)	
1964	(United States) Ken Loeffler	Basketball Association of America (BAA) Western Division championship (St. Louis, 1948); National Invitation Tournament (NIT) championship (La Salle, 1952); NCAA championship (La Salle, 1954); East All-Star coach in College All-Star Game (1955)	
1965	(United States) Howard Hobson	NCAA championship (Oregon, 1939); member and treasurer of National Basketball Rules Committee; member of U.S. Olympic Basketball Olympic Committee	
1966	(United States) Everett Dean	Three Big Ten Conference championships (Indiana; 1926, 1928, 1936); NCAA championship (Stanford, 1942)	
1968	(United States) Howard Cann	National Coach of the Year (1947); NIT championship (NYU, 1948)	
1968	(United States) Slats Gill	Five Pacific Coast Conference championships (Oregon State; 1933, 1947, 1949, 1955, 1958); eight Far West Conference championships; coached 1964 NABC All-Star Game	
1968	(United States) Doggie Julian	NCAA championship (Holy Cross, 1947); three Ivy League championships (Dartmouth; 1956, 1958–59)	
1969	(United States) Red Auerbach	Nine National Basketball Association (NBA) championships (Boston Celtics; 1957, 1959–66); coached NBA All-Star Game (1957–67); NBA Coach of the Year (1965); NBA Executive of the Year (1980); one of the Top 10 Coaches in NBA History (1996)	
1969	(United States) Henry Iba	Two-time National Coach of the Year (Oklahoma A&M; 1945–46); 14 Missouri Valley Conference championships (Oklahoma A&M); Big Eight championship (Oklahoma State, 1965); first of only two coaches in history to win two Olympic gold medals, FIBA Hall of Fame (2007)	
1969	(United States) Adolph Rupp	NIT championship (Kentucky, 1946); four NCAA championships (Kentucky; 1948, 1949, 1951, 1958); four-time National and Southeastern Conference Coach of the Year; co-coached U.S. Olympic team (London, 1948); 27 Southeastern Conference championships (Kentucky)	
1970	(United States) Ben Carnevale	Southern Conference championship (North Carolina, 1945); NCAA championship (North Carolina, 1946); College Coach of the Year, 1947; five NCAA and two NIT tournament appearances (Navy)	
1972	(United States) Edgar Diddle	First coach in NCAA history to coach 1,000 games at one school; three NCAA and eight NIT tournament appearances (Western Kentucky); won 32 conference titles in 3 conferences; pioneer of fast break basketball	
1973	(United States) Bruce Drake	Three NCAA tournament appearances and six conference championships (Oklahoma; 1939, 1943, 1947); Chairman of NCAA Rules Committee (1951–55); co-coached U.S. Olympic team (Melbourne, 1956)	
1973	(United States) Dutch Lonborg	AAU championship (Washburn, 1925); Big Ten Conference championship (Northwestern, 1931); chaired the NCAA Tournament Committee (1947–60); manager of U.S. Olympic team (Rome, 1960)	
1973	(United States) John Wooden	Ten NCAA championships in 12 years (UCLA; 1964–65, 1967–73, 1975); NCAA College Basketball Coach of the Year (UCLA; 1964, 1967, 1969–70, 1972–73); NCAA Division I record winning streak of 88 games; The Sporting News Sportsman of the Year (1970); Sports Illustrated Sportsman of the Year (1973); compiled an 885–203 (.813) record during his 40-year coaching career	
1976	(United States) Harry Litwack	NCAA Final Four (Temple; 1956, 1958)	
1977	(United States) Frank McGuire	NCAA runner-up (St. John's, 1952); NCAA championship (North Carolina, 1957); National Coach of the Year (St. Johns, 1952; North Carolina, 1957; South Carolina, 1970); ACC Coach of the Year (North Carolina, 1957; South Carolina, 1971)	
1979	(United States) Sam Barry	Illinois Intercollegiate Athletic Conference championships (Knox College; 1919–20); Big Ten Conference championship (Iowa, 1923); Pacific Coast Conference championships (USC; 1930, 1935, 1940); NCAA third-place finish (USC, 1940)	
1979	(United States) Eddie Hickey	4 Missouri Valley Conference championships (Creighton); NIT championship (St. Louis, 1948); Cotton Bowl (1949) and Sugar Bowl (1950, 1952) championships (St. Louis); United States Basketball Writers Association (USBWA) Coach of the Year (1959)	
1979	(United States) Ray Meyer	NCAA Final Four (DePaul, 1943, 1979); NIT championship (DePaul, 1945); USBWA Coach of the Year (DePaul, 1978); NABC Coach of the Year (DePaul, 1979)	
1980	(United States) Everett Shelton	Developed five-man weave offense; AAU national championship (Denver Safeways, 1937); NCAA championship (Wyoming, 1943)	
1981	(United States) Arad McCutchan	Five NCAA College Division championships (Evansville; 1959–60, 1964–65, 1971); NCAA College Division Coach of the Year (1964–65); coached the Olympic Trials teams (1960, 1968)	
1982	(United States) Everett Case	4 state championships (Frankfort High School; 1925, 1929, 1936, 1939); six Southern Conference titles (NC State; 1947–52); 4 Atlantic Coast Conference titles (NC State; 1954–56, 1959); ACC Coach of the Year (NC State; 1954–55, 1958)	
1982	(United States) Clarence Gaines	12 Central Intercollegiate Athletic Association (CIAA) championships; CIAA Coach of the Year (1961, 1963, 1970, 1975, 1980); NCAA College Division championship (Winston-Salem State, 1967); NCAA College Division Coach of the Year (1967)	
1983	(United States) Dean Smith	NIT championship (North Carolina, 1971); 3 NCAA championships (As player with Kansas; 1952 and as coach of North Carolina; 1982, 1993); Olympic gold medal (Montreal, 1976); Sports Illustrated Sportsman of the Year (1997), FIBA Hall of Fame (2007)	
1984	(United States) Jack Gardner	National Coach of the Year (1970); three Big Seven titles (Kansas State); five Skyline Conference titles (Utah); coached NABC East-West All-Star (1953, 1960, 1964)	
1985	(United States) Harold Anderson	NIT third-place finish (Toledo, 1942); six NIT and three NCAA tournament berths (Bowling Green); first coach to take two different schools to the NIT; President of NABC (1962–63)	
1985	(United States) Marv Harshman	National Association of Intercollegiate Athletics (NAIA) championship game (Pacific Lutheran, 1959); coached U.S. Pan American gold medal (1975); seven-time NAIA District I Coach of the Year; NABC Coach of the Year NCAA Division I (Washington, 1984)	
1985	(United States) Margaret Wade	All-Conference (Delta State; 1930–32); Association for Intercollegiate Athletics for Women (AIAW) National Championships (Delta State; 1975–77); later a member of the inaugural class of the Women's Basketball Hall of Fame (1999)	
1986	(United States) Red Holzman	National Basketball League (NBL) All-Star First-Team (1946, 1948); NBA Coach of the Year (1970); three NBA championships (Rochester Royals, 1951; New York Knicks, 1970, 1973); one of the Top 10 Coaches in NBA History (1996)	
1986	(United States) Fred Taylor	NCAA championship (Ohio State, 1960); NCAA Final Four (1960–62, 1968); won or shared seven Big Ten Conference titles (1960–62, 1963–64, 1968, 1971); Coach of the Year by USBWA and United Press International (1961–62)	
1986	(United States) Stan Watts	Two NIT championships (BYU; 1951, 1966); eight conference titles: Mountain State Athletic Conference (1950–51), Skyline Conference (1957), Western Athletic Conference (1965, 1967, 1969, 1971–72); 11 postseason tournaments (4 NITs, seven NCAAs)	
1988	(United States) Ralph Miller	Associated Press National Coach of the Year (Oregon State, 1981–82); conference championships (Wichita, 1964; Iowa, 1968, 1970; Oregon State, 1980–82); Pac-10 Coach of the Year (Oregon State, 1975, 1981)	
1991	(United States) Bob Knight	Four NCAA championships (Ohio State as a player, 1960 and Indiana as a coach; 1976, 1981, 1987); Big Ten Conference Coach of the Year (1973, 1975–76, 1980–81); National Coach of the Year (1975–87, 1989); Olympic gold medal (Los Angeles, 1984)	
1992	(United States) Lou Carnesecca	Big East Conference Coach of the Year (St. John's, 1983, 1985–86); National Coach of the Year by USBWA (1983, 1985) and NABC (1985); NCAA Final Four (St. John's, 1985); NIT championship (St. John's, 1989)	
1992	(United States) Al McGuire	NIT championship (Marquette, 1970); National Coach of the Year (1971); NABC Coach of the Year (1974); NCAA championship (1977)	
1992	(United States) Jack Ramsay	NCAA Final Four (St. Joseph's College, 1965); NBA championship (Portland Trail Blazers, 1977); led Portland to playoffs 9 times in 10 seasons; retired as the NBA's second-winningest coach; one of the Top 10 Coaches in NBA History (1996)	
1992	(United States) Phil Woolpert	NCAA championship (San Francisco; 1955–56); Coach of the Year (1955–56); NCAA third-place finish (San Francisco, 1957); Pacific Coach of the Year (1957–58)	
1994	(United States) Denny Crum	USA World University Games gold medal (1977); two NCAA Championships (Louisville; 1980, 1986); National Coach of the Year (Louisville; 1980, 1983, 1986); three NIT tournaments and the 1985 NIT Semifinals (all Louisville); 3 Missouri Valley Conference titles, 12 regular season Metro Conference titles and 11 Metro Conference championships (all Louisville)	
1994	(United States) Chuck Daly	Ivy League championship (Pennsylvania; 1972–75); NBA championships (Detroit Pistons, 1989–90); three Eastern and Central Division titles (Detroit Pistons; 1988–90); Olympic gold medal (Barcelona, 1992); one of the Top 10 Coaches in NBA History (1996)	
1994	(Italy) Cesare Rubini	Olympics silver medal (Moscow, 1980); EuroBasket gold medal (1983); EuroBasket 1985 bronze medal; 9 Italian League championships (1958–60, 1962–63, 1965–67, 1972), FIBA Hall of Fame (2013)	
1995	(Soviet Union) (Russia) Alexander Gomelsky	Six EuroBasket Championships (1963, 1965, 1967, 1969, 1979, 1981); 2 World Cups (1967, 1982); Olympics gold medal (Seoul, 1988); three-time European Coach of the Year; Olympic Order from International Olympic Committee; FIBA Hall of Fame (2007), one of the 10 Greatest Coaches in EuroLeague History (2008)	
1995	(United States) John Kundla	NBL championship (Minneapolis Lakers, 1948); BAA championship (Minneapolis Lakers, 1949); NBA championship (Minneapolis Lakers, 1950, 1952–54); coached 4 NBA All-Star Games (1951–54); one of the Top 10 Coaches in NBA History (1996)	
1997	(United States) Pete Carril	13 Ivy League championships (Princeton); NIT championship (Princeton, 1975); 13 postseason tournaments (Princeton; 11 NCAA, 2 NIT); led nation in defensive points allowed (14 times)	
1997	(Spain) Antonio Díaz-Miguel	EuroBasket silver medal (1973, 1983); Spain's Coach of the Year (1980–81, 1982–83); Olympics silver medal (Los Angeles, 1984); Spanish national team Coach from 1965 to 1992, FIBA Hall of Fame (2007)	
1997	(United States) Don Haskins	NCAA championship (Texas Western, 1966); had the fourth-most wins in NCAA history (1999)	
1998	(United States) Jody Conradt	National Coach of the Year (1980, 1984, 1986, 1997); NCAA championship (Texas, 1986); Southwest Conference Coach of the Year (1984–85, 1987–88, 1996); member of the inaugural class of the Women's Basketball Hall of Fame (1999)	
1998	(United States) Alex Hannum	2X NBA championships (1958 St. Louis Hawks and 1967 Philadelphia 76ers); AAU championship (Wichita Vickers, 1959); NBA Coach of the Year (1964); American Basketball Association (ABA) Coach of the Year (1969); ABA championship with 1969 Oakland Oaks	
1998	(Socialist Federal Republic of Yugoslavia) (Serbia) Aleksandar Nikolić	European Coach of the Year (1966, 1976); EuroBasket gold medal (1977 EuroBasket); FIBA World Cup gold medal (1978); FIBA Hall of Fame (2007), one of the 10 Greatest Coaches in EuroLeague History (2008)	
1998	(United States) Lenny Wilkens	NBA championship (Seattle SuperSonics, 1979); assistant coach of U.S. gold medal basketball team (Barcelona, 1992); NBA Coach of the Year (1994); Olympic gold medal (Atlanta, 1996); one of the Top 10 Coaches in NBA History (1996)	
1999	(United States) Billie Moore	AIAW championship (Cal State Fullerton, 1970); AIAW Final Four (1970, 1972, 1975, 1978–79); Olympic silver medal (Montreal, 1976); AIAW Championship (UCLA, 1978)	
1999	(United States) John Thompson	NCAA championship (Georgetown, 1984); NCAA Final Fours (1982, 1984–85); National Coach of the Year (1984, 1985–87); Big East Coach of the Year (1980, 1987, 1992)	
2000	(United States) Pat Summitt	Olympic gold medal, (Los Angeles, 1984); eight NCAA championships (Tennessee; 1987, 1989, 1991, 1996–98, 2007–08); Naismith College Coach of the Year (1987, 1989, 1994, 1998); Naismith Coach of the Century (2000); member of the inaugural class of the Women's Basketball Hall of Fame (1999), FIBA Hall of Fame (2013)	
2000	(United States) Morgan Wootten	Five high school national championships (DeMatha High School; 1962, 1965, 1968, 1978, 1984); USA Today National Coach of the Year (1984); Walt Disney Award (1991); Naismith Scholastic Coach of the Century (2000)	
2001	(United States) John Chaney	NCAA Division II championship (Cheyney State, 1978); Division II National Coach of the Year (1978); USBWA National Coach of the Year (Temple, 1987–88); Atlantic 10 Conference Coach of the Year (Temple, 1984–85, 1987–88, 2000)	
2001	(United States) Mike Krzyzewski	At time of induction: Three national championships (Duke; 1991–92, 2001); Nine NCAA Final Fours (Duke; 1986, 1988–92, 1994, 1999, 2001); Since induction: Two National Championships (Duke, 2010, 2015); Four NCAA Final Fours (Duke; 2004, 2010, 2015, 2022); Winningest coach in the NCAA tournament; Winningest coach in NCAA Division I men's history; First coach to lead a team to three Olympic gold medals in basketball (2008, 2012, 2016); FIBA World Championship, 2010, 2014	
2002	(United States) Larry Brown	NCAA championship (Kansas, 1988); USA Basketball National Coach of the Year (1999); NBA Coach of the Year (2001); later won the NBA championship with the Detroit Pistons (2004)	
2002	(United States) Lute Olson	NCAA championship (Arizona, 1997); National Coach of the Year (1988, 1990); gold medal coach at Jones Cup (1984) and World Championships (1986)	
2002	(United States) Kay Yow	NCAA Final Four (N.C. State, 1998); Olympic gold medal (Seoul, 1988); enshrined in the Women's Basketball Hall of Fame (2000), FIBA Hall of Fame (2009)	
2003	(United States) Leon Barmore	Naismith National Coach of the Year (Louisiana Tech, 1982); nine NCAA Final Fours (all with Louisiana Tech) and two national titles (1982 and 1988); reached 500 wins faster than any other coach in women's basketball history; enshrined in the Women's Basketball Hall of Fame (2003)	
2004	(United States) Bill Sharman	Only coach to win professional championships and Coach of the Year honors the same season in three different leagues (American Basketball League, Cleveland Pipers, 1962; ABA, Utah Stars, 1971; NBA, Los Angeles Lakers, 1972); coached the Los Angeles Lakers to an NBA-record 33 consecutive victories (1971–72)	
2005	(United States) Jim Boeheim	National championship (Syracuse, 2003); Big East Conference Coach of the Year (Syracuse, 1984, 1991, 2000, 2010); four NCAA Final Fours (Syracuse, 1987, 1996, 2003, 2013, 2016); USA Basketball National Coach of the Year (2001); AP National Coach of the Year (2010).	
2005	(United States) Jim Calhoun	National championships (Connecticut; 1999, 2004, 2011); NIT Championship (Connecticut, 1988); National Coach of the Year (1990); Big East Conference Coach of the Year (1990, 1994, 1996, 1998)	
2005	(United States) Sue Gunter	Retired as the third-winningest coach in Division I women's basketball history; National Coach of the Year (LSU, 1983); enshrined in the Women's Basketball Hall of Fame (2001)	
2006	(United States) Geno Auriemma	At time of induction: Five National Championships (Connecticut; 1995, 2000, 2002–04); Two unbeaten seasons (1995, 2002); NCAA Division I record winning streak of 70 games; 5× National Coach of the Year (1995, 1997, 2000, 2002–03); Enshrined in the Women's Basketball Hall of Fame (2006); Since induction: Seven National Championships (2009–10, 2013–16, 2025); Four unbeaten seasons (2009–10, 2014, 2016); Separate Division I record winning streaks of 90 and 111 games; 5× National Coach of the Year (2008–09, 2011, 2016–17); Coached USA to Olympic gold medals in 2012 and 2016	
2006	(Italy) Sandro Gamba	Olympics silver medal (Moscow, 1980); EuroBasket gold medal (1983); EuroBasket silver medal (1991); EuroBasaket bronze medal (1985)	
2007	(United States) Van Chancellor	At time of induction: 3× Southeastern Conference Coach of the Year (Mississippi, 1987, 1990, 1992); 4× WNBA titles (Houston Comets, 1997–2000); 3× coach of the WNBA Western Conference All-Stars (1999, 2000, 2001); Coach of the WNBA's All-Decade Team (2006); Retired from the WNBA as the league's winningest coach; 2× USA Basketball National Coach of the Year (2002, 2004); World Championship gold medal (2002); Olympic gold (2004); Since induction: Southeastern Conference Coach of the Year (LSU, 2008)	
2007	(Spain) Pedro Ferrándiz	4 EuroLeague championships (Real Madrid; 1965, 1967, 1968, 1974); co-founder of the World Association of Basketball Coaches (1976); Olympic Order from International Olympic Committee; FIBA Order of Merit (2000); one of the 10 Greatest Coaches in EuroLeague History (2008), FIBA Hall of Fame (2009)	
2007	(United States) Phil Jackson	First coach in NBA history to lead a team to three consecutive championships in three separate stretches (Chicago Bulls, 1991–93, 1996–98; Los Angeles Lakers, 2000–02, and also led Lakers to championships in 2009 and 2010); coached the Chicago Bulls to NBA-record 72–10 season (1995–96); led his teams to NBA-record 25 consecutive postseason series victories (1996–2003); winner of NBA-record 11 championships; one of the Top 10 Coaches in NBA History (1996)	
2007	(Socialist Federal Republic of Yugoslavia) (Croatia) Mirko Novosel	Olympics silver medal (1976), bronze medal (1984) with Yugoslavia; FIBA World Cup silver medal with Yugoslavia (1974); seven Yugoslav Cups (KK Cibona; 1969, 1980–83, 1985, 1988), FIBA Hall of Fame (2010)	
2007	(United States) Roy Williams	3 NCAA Titles (2005, 2009, 2017); 9 NCAA Final Four (Kansas, 1991, 1993, 2002, 2003; North Carolina, 2005, 2008, 2009, 2016, 2017); took less time than any other men's basketball coach to win 500 games; six-time National Coach of the Year	
2008	(United States) Pat Riley	NBA Coach of the Year (Los Angeles Lakers, 1990; New York Knicks, 1993; Miami Heat, 1997); five NBA championships (1982, 1985, 1987–1988 with the Lakers, 2006 with the Heat); one of the Top 10 Coaches in NBA History (1996); a record 11-time NBA Coach of the Month	
2008	(United States) Cathy Rush	Three consecutive AIAW national titles (Immaculata, 1972–74, a team inducted as a unit in 2014); Pan American Games gold medal (1975); USBWA Pioneer Award (1994); founder of Women's Athletic Service, Inc.; enshrined in Women's Basketball Hall of Fame (2000)	
2009	(United States) Jerry Sloan	First NBA coach to win 1,000 games with a single franchise (Utah Jazz); Sporting News NBA Coach of the Year (2004); two NBA Finals appearances (1997–98); nine-time NBA Coach of the Month; tied for third for winningest coach in NBA history	
2009	(United States) C. Vivian Stringer	National Coach of the Year (Cheyney State, 1982; Iowa, 1988, 1993); first coach to lead 3 different schools to the NCAA Final Four (Cheyney, Iowa, Rutgers); led teams to 29 20-win seasons in her first 38 years; enshrined in Women's Basketball Hall of Fame (2001)	
2010	(United States) Bob Hurley	Three USA Today national high school championships (1989, 1996, 2008); three-time USA Today National Coach of the Year (1989, 1996, 2008); 25 New Jersey state parochial school championships; five undefeated seasons (1974, 1989, 1996, 2003, 2008)	
2011	(United States) Herb Magee	Head coach at Philadelphia University (1967–present); most wins by an NCAA men's head coach in any division; NCAA College Division (now Division II) championship (1970); Division II Coach of the Year (1976); NABC Guardians of the Game award (2005); Philadelphia Sports Hall of Fame (2008); also a renowned shooting instructor	
2011	(United States) Tara VanDerveer	Head coach at Stanford University (1985–95, 1996–2024); three NCAA championships (1990, 1992, 2021) and eleven other Final Four appearances (1991, 1995, 1997, 2008–2012, 2014, 2017, 2022); Naismith National Coach of the Year (1990, 2002); Olympic gold medal (USA, 1996); Women's Basketball Hall of Fame (2002); Winningest coach in NCAA Division I women's history	
2012	(Soviet Union) (Russia) Lidiya Alekseyeva	Two Olympic gold medals (1976, 1980) and 11 European championships as head coach of the Soviet Union women's team; Women's Basketball Hall of Fame (1999); FIBA Hall of Fame (2007)	
2012	(United States) Don Nelson	Winningest coach in NBA history (1,335 wins) at time of induction; three-time NBA Coach of the Year (1983, 1985, 1992); 18 consecutive postseason appearances; one of the Top 10 Coaches in NBA History (1996); also coached USA men to World Championship gold in 1994	
2013	(United States) Sylvia Hatchell	One of only six college women's basketball coaches with more than 1000 wins at the time of induction; only college women's coach to win national championships at three different levels (AIAW Division II, Francis Marion, 1982; NAIA Division I, Francis Marion, 1986; NCAA Division I, North Carolina, 1994); AP Coach of the Year (2006), Women's Basketball Hall of Fame (2004)	
2013	(United States) Guy Lewis	Won nearly 600 games in a 30-year career at the University of Houston; responsible for the integration of the Houston program; five Final Four appearances, including the Phi Slama Jama teams (1967, 1968, 1982, 1983, 1984); twice AP Coach of the Year (1968, 1983); architect of the 1968 "Game of the Century" against UCLA, the first nationally televised regular-season college game	
2013	(United States) Rick Pitino	Only NCAA Division I men's coach to win national championships at two different schools (Kentucky, 1996; Louisville, 2013 - vacated); first coach to take three different schools to the men's Final Four (Providence, Kentucky, Louisville); four-time conference Coach of the Year (Southeastern Conference three times, Conference USA once)	
2013	(United States) Jerry Tarkanian	Took three different programs to the NCAA men's tournament (Long Beach State, UNLV, Fresno State); one national championship (1990) and three other Final Fours at UNLV (1977, 1987, 1991); four-time national Coach of the Year (1977, 1983, 1984, 1990)	
2014	(United States) Bobby "Slick" Leonard	Three ABA championships (Indiana Pacers, 1970, 1972, 1973); winningest coach in Pacers history (529 wins), winningest coach in ABA history (387 wins), and winningest playoff coach in ABA history (69 wins)	
2014	(United States) Nolan Richardson	Only coach to win NJCAA, NIT, and NCAA Division I titles (respectively Western Texas, 1980; Tulsa, 1981; and Arkansas, 1994); two other Final Fours at Arkansas (1990 & 1995); nine conference championships at Arkansas (both SWC and SEC); Naismith Coach of the Year, 1994; also coached Panama and Mexico national teams	
2014	(United States) Gary Williams	Over 600 career college coaching wins (American, Boston College, Ohio State, Maryland); one national championship (2002), one other Final Four (2001), and three ACC regular-season titles (1995, 2002, 2010) at Maryland; twice ACC Coach of the Year (2002, 2010)	
2015	(United States) John Calipari	The only coach to coach a men's college basketball team to 38 wins in a season. He has done it three times – in 2008 (Memphis Tigers – vacated), 2012 (Kentucky Wildcats), 2015 (Kentucky Wildcats). He has won one National Championship (2012), two runner-up finishes (2008 – vacated), (2014), and three other Final Fours (1996 – vacated), (2011), (2015). He's won one NIT championship (2002), twelve conference tournament championships (5 Atlantic-10, 4 Conference USA, 3 SEC), and twelve conference regular season championships (5 Atlantic-10, 4 Conference USA, 3 SEC). He's been named three times the Naismith Coach of the Year (1996, 2008, 2015), once the Associated Press Coach of the Year (2015), 3 NABC Coach of the Year awards (1996, 2009, 2015), as well as a multitude of other awards including conference coach of the year seven times (1 Atlantic-10, 3 Conference USA, 3 SEC).	
2015	(Australia) Lindsay Gaze	Coached Australian national team in four Olympic Games (1972, 1976, 1980, 1984); 3x NBL Coach of the Year; Author, Better Basketball and Winning Basketball; Enshrinee, FIBA Hall of Fame, 2010	
2015	(United States) Tom Heinsohn	NBA Coach of the Year, 1973; 2 NBA Championships with the Boston Celtics (1974, 1976); Led Boston Celtics to five consecutive first-place finishes in the Atlantic Division, 1972–77; Led Boston Celtics to franchise record 68 wins, 1973	
2016	(United States) Tom Izzo	Over 600 college career wins, 1 NCAA Championship (2000), 8x NCAA Final Fours, AP College Coach of the Year (1998), 9x Big Ten Regular Season Championships, 6x Big Ten Tournament Championships, 3x Big Ten Coach of the Year	
2016	(United States) John McLendon	Over 400 college career wins, 3x NAIA Coach of the Year award, 3x NAIA championships with Tennessee State A&I University, 8 CIAA Championships (1941, 1943–44, 1946–47, 1949–50, 1952) with North Carolina College for Negroes; Previously inducted in 1979 as a contributor	
2017	(United States) Robert Hughes	Winningest coach in High School Boys Basketball History, 5x Texas State Championships, 1x National High School Coach of the Year (2003), Recipient of the Morgan Wootten Lifetime Achievement Award (2010)	
2017	(United States) Muffet McGraw	2 NCAA Championships (2001, 2018), 9x NCAA Final Fours, 3x AP Coach of the Year (2001, 2013, 2014), 1 of 6 Coaches (Male or Female) with 800 wins, 9 Final Fours, and 7 Championship Game Appearances	
2017	(United States) Bill Self	Over 700 college career wins, 2 NCAA Championships (2008, 2022), 4x NCAA Final Fours (2008, 2012, 2018 (vacated), 2022), 2x AP National Coach of the Year (2009, 2016), 6x Big 12 Conference Coach of the Year (2006, 2009, 2011, 2012, 2016, 2018), 1x Western Athletic Conference Coach of the Year (2000), NCAA Record 14 consecutive regular season conference titles (2005–2018)	
2018	(United States) Lefty Driesell	Won nearly 800 games, 1972 NIT Championship, 16 Conference Championships (2 ACC, 5 SoCon, 5 CAA, 4 Atlantic Sun), & 6 Conference Tournament Championships (1 ACC, 3 SoCon, 1 CAA, 1 Atlantic Sun). Inventor of “Midnight Madness”, first coach to win 100 games at four different schools (Davidson, Maryland, James Madison, & Georgia State), first coach to be named Conference Coach of the Year in four different conferences, one of 11 coaches to lead four schools to the NCAA Tournament.	
2019	(United States) Bill Fitch	Over 900 NBA wins, 1981 NBA champion, 2x NBA Coach of the Year, took 5 different teams to the NBA Playoffs, one of the Top 10 Coaches in NBA History (1996), Chuck Daly Lifetime Achievement Award (2013)	
2020	(United States) Kim Mulkey	4 NCAA Championships (2005, 2012 and 2019 with Baylor, 2023 with LSU), 5x NCAA Final Fours	
2020	(United States) Barbara Stevens	NCAA Division II National (2014)	
2020	(United States) Eddie Sutton	Over 800 wins, 3x NCAA Final Fours (Arkansas 1978, Oklahoma State 1995 & 2004).	
2020	(United States) Rudy Tomjanovich	2 NBA Championships with the Houston Rockets (1994 & 1995), 2000 Olympic Gold Medalist.	
2021	(United States) Rick Adelman	1 of 9 NBA Head Coaches with over 1000 wins.	
2021	(United States) Cotton Fitzsimmons	2x NBA Coach of the Year, 2x NJCAA National Championships	
2021	(United States) Bill Russell	First black head coach in NBA history, and the first to win an NBA title. 2 NBA Championships with the Boston Celtics (1968, 1969).	
2021	(United States) Jay Wright	2 NCAA Championships (2016, 2018), 3x NCAA Final Fours, 2x Naismith National Coach of the Year (2006, 2016), 6x Big East Conference Coach of the Year (2006, 2009, 2014–16, 2019)	
2022	(United States) Theresa Grentz	1 AIAW Championship (1982), 1992 Olympic Bronze Medalist	
2022	(United States) Bob Huggins	2x NCAA Final Fours (Cincinnati 1992, West Virginia 2010), 11x Conference Regular Season Titles (1x OVC, 2x Great Midwest, 8x C-USA), 10x Conference Tournament Titles (1x OVC, 4x Great Midwest, 4x C-USA, 1x Big East)	
2022	(United States) George Karl	2013 NBA Coach of the Year; reached the NBA Playoffs 22 times with 5 different teams	
2022	(United States) Marianne Stanley	1 NCAA Championship (1985), 2002 WNBA Coach of the Year	
2023	(United States) Gene Bess	1,300 wins, 2X NJCAA National Championships, 2X NJCAA National Coach of the Year	
2023	(United States) Gary Blair	2011 NCAA Women's National Championship, 2x Final Four appearances, 852 career wins	
2023	(United States) David Hixon	2x NCAA DIII National Championships, 7x NCAA DIII Final Four Appearances, 2x NABC DIII Coach of the Year	
2023	(United States) Gene Keady	7x Big Ten Coach of the Year, 6X Big Ten championships, 4X National Coach of the Year	
2023	(United States) Gregg Popovich	5x NBA championships (1999, 2003, 2005, 2007, 2014), 3x Coach of the Year, Winningest coach in NBA history	
2024	(United States) Harley Redin	6x AAU national championships, 76 game winning streak from 1955-1958, 2018 John Bunn Lifetime Achievement Award	
2024	(United States) Bo Ryan	4x DIII national championships, 2x NCAA Final Four appearances (2014, 2015), 6x WIAC coach of the year	
2024	(United States) Charles Smith	1,152 career wins, 9X state championships with Peabody High School, winningest coach in the state of Louisiana	
2025	(United States) Billy Donovan	2x NCAA championships (2006–2007), 4x NCAA Final Four appearances (2000, 2006, 2007, 2014)	
2026	(United States) Mark Few	Gonzaga head coach since 1999, Guided Bulldogs to NCAA title game appearances in 2017 and 2021, Assistant coach on gold-medal-winning 2024 U.S. men's Olympic team	
2026	(United States) Doc Rivers	1x NBA champion (2008), 1x NBA Cup champion (2024), 1x NBA Coach of the Year (1999), 4x NBA All-Star Game head coach (2008, 2011, 2021, 2024), Top 15 Coaches in NBA History	

== Notes ==
- ^{a} Nationality based on coach career
- ^{b} According to individuals' pages on the official website
