= List of NBA retired numbers =

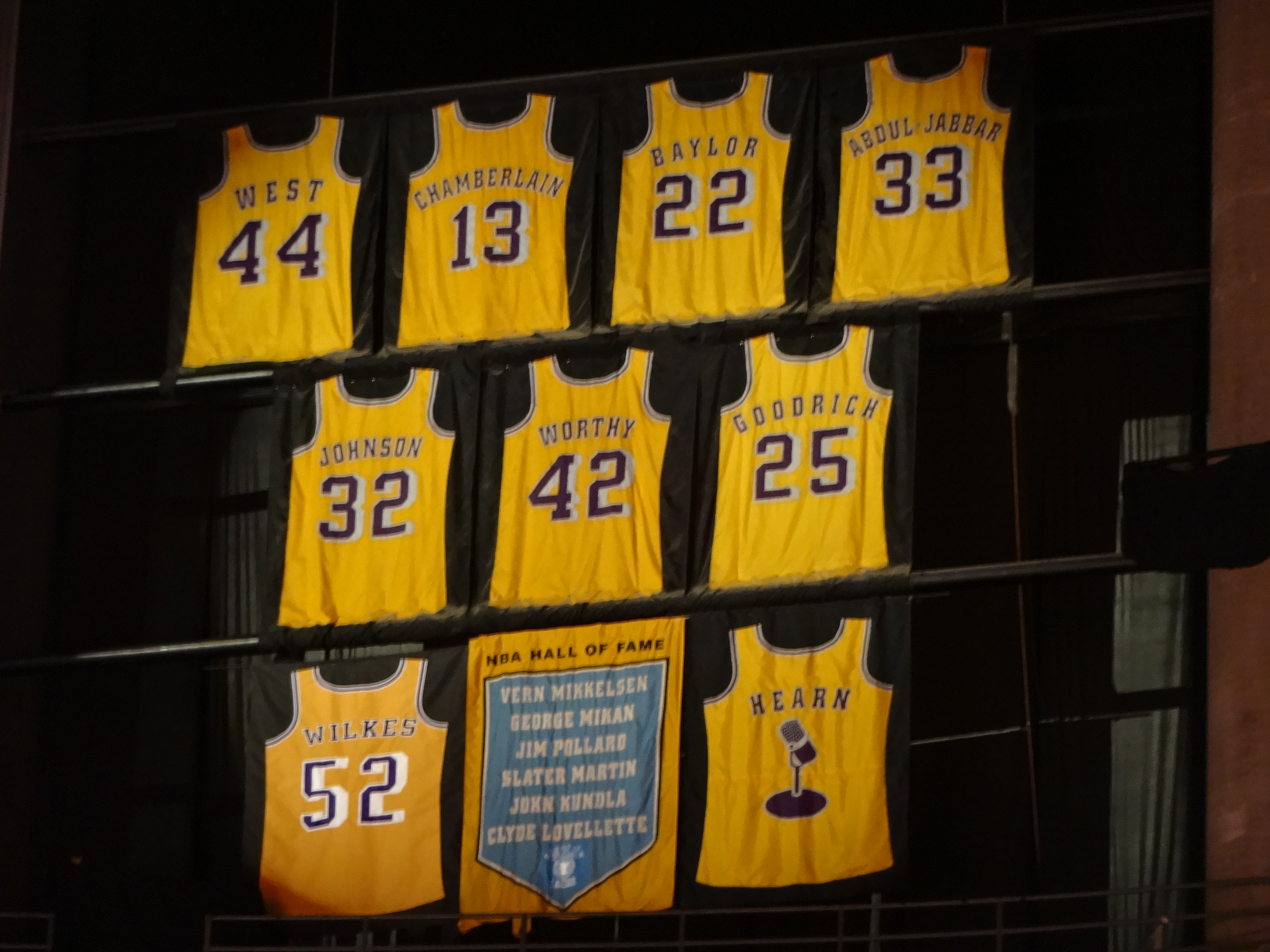
Los Angeles Lakers retired jerseys hanging inside the Staples Center, January 2013

As a way to honor key contributors including players, coaches, fans, broadcasters and announcers, National Basketball Association (NBA) teams often retire their jersey numbers, win totals, or microphones. In the case of jersey numbers, they are usually no longer available for future players to wear, although they can ask for permission from players whose jerseys are retired. Teams usually display these numbers by hanging banners on the rafters inside their home arena. As of 2026, only the Los Angeles Clippers do not have any retired numbers. Two players have had their numbers retired by teams they did not play for, and only one player (Bill Russell) had his number retired league wide.

== List ==
Key:

†
Inducted to the Basketball Hall of Fame
‡
Number retired league-wide
*
Number to be retired in the future

Retired NBA numbers
| No. | Name | Team | Pos. | Years with franchise | Note | Refs |
|---|---|---|---|---|---|---|
| 9 | Bob Pettit† | Atlanta Hawks | F | 1954–1965 | Did not play for franchise in Atlanta. Played in Milwaukee during rookie season of 1954–55, then remainder of career in St. Louis. | |
| 21 | Dominique Wilkins† | Atlanta Hawks | F | 1982–1994 | Currently team vice president and television color analyst. | |
| 23 | Lou Hudson† | Atlanta Hawks | F | 1966–1977 | The team was in St. Louis in his first two seasons (1966–1968). | |
| 44 | Pete Maravich† | Atlanta Hawks | G | 1970–1974 | One of three players to have his jersey retired by three different teams (Atlanta, New Orleans, Utah) | |
| 55 | Dikembe Mutombo† | Atlanta Hawks | C | 1996–2001 | | |
| 59 | Kasim Reed | Atlanta Hawks | — | 2010–2018 | As mayor of Atlanta. Number represents his status as the 59th mayor of the city. | |
| — | Ted Turner | Atlanta Hawks | — | 1977–2001 | As team owner. While the team presented Turner a framed Hawks jersey with No. 17, the banner raised to the rafters carried an old Hawks logo with Turner's name instead of a number. | |
| 00 | Robert Parish† | Boston Celtics | C | 1980–1994 | | |
| 1 | Walter A. Brown† | Boston Celtics | — | 1946–1964 | As team founder–owner. | |
| 2 | Red Auerbach† | Boston Celtics | — | 1950–2006 | As head coach (1950–1966) and executive (1950–2006). | |
| 3 | Dennis Johnson† | Boston Celtics | G | 1983–1990 | Served as assistant coach from 1993 to 1997. | |
| 5 | Kevin Garnett† | Boston Celtics | F | 2007–2013 | | |
| 6‡ | Bill Russell† | Boston Celtics | C | 1956–1969 | Russell's #6 was first retired in the Boston Garden on March 12, 1972, but due to Russell's tense relationship with the media and fans at the time, the ceremony was closed to the public. On May 26, 1999, Russell's number was re-retired in a public ceremony at the FleetCenter. Also served as head coach (1966–1969). Number retired league-wide in 2022. | |
| 10 | Jo Jo White† | Boston Celtics | G | 1969–1979 | | |
| 14 | Bob Cousy† | Boston Celtics | G | 1950–1963 | Later served as team ambassador and color analyst. | |
| 15 | Tom Heinsohn† | Boston Celtics | F | 1956–1965 | Also served as head coach (1969–1978); as broadcaster (1980–2020). | |
| 16 | Satch Sanders† | Boston Celtics | F | 1960–1973 | Also served as head coach (1978). | |
| 17 | John Havlicek† | Boston Celtics | F | 1962–1978 | | |
| 18 | Dave Cowens† | Boston Celtics | C | 1970–1980 | Also served as head coach (1978–1979). | |
| 19 | Don Nelson† | Boston Celtics | F | 1965–1976 | | |
| 21 | Bill Sharman† | Boston Celtics | G | 1951–1961 | | |
| 22 | Ed Macauley† | Boston Celtics | C | 1950–1956 | | |
| 23 | Frank Ramsey† | Boston Celtics | F | 1954–1964 | Did not play in the 1955–56 season due to military service. | |
| 24 | Sam Jones† | Boston Celtics | G | 1957–1969 | | |
| 25 | K. C. Jones† | Boston Celtics | G | 1958–1967 | Also served as head coach (1983–1988). | |
| 31 | Cedric Maxwell | Boston Celtics | F | 1977–1985 | Also served as broadcaster (2001–present); briefly wore no. 30 in 1977–78. | |
| 32 | Kevin McHale† | Boston Celtics | F | 1980–1993 | | |
| 33 | Larry Bird† | Boston Celtics | F | 1979–1992 | | |
| 34 | Paul Pierce† | Boston Celtics | F | 1998–2013 | | |
| 35 | Reggie Lewis | Boston Celtics | G | 1987–1993 | Died of a heart attack while still playing for the team; number retired posthumously. | |
| LOSCY (Note: Loscutoff asked that his number (No. 18) not be retired to allow future Celtics to wear it. His number is represented by "LOSCY." His number 18 was later retired in honor of Cowens.) | Jim Loscutoff | Boston Celtics | F | 1955–1964 | Wore no. 18 but decided to keep it active; number ultimately retired for Dave Cowens. | |
| 🎤 | Johnny Most | Boston Celtics | — | 1953–1990 | As broadcaster. | |
| 3 | Dražen Petrović† | Brooklyn Nets | G | 1991–1993 | Died in a car crash while playing for the team; with the team when it was known as the New Jersey Nets. His jersey was retired posthumously. | |
| 5 | Jason Kidd† | Brooklyn Nets | G | 2001–2008 | The team was then the New Jersey Nets. Also served as head coach (2013–2014). | |
| 15 | Vince Carter† | Brooklyn Nets | G/F | 2004–2009 | The team was then the New Jersey Nets. | |
| 23 | John Williamson | Brooklyn Nets | G | 1973–1980 | During his first four seasons (1973–1977), the team was on Long Island and known as the New York Nets; for the rest of his career with the team, it was the New Jersey Nets. | |
| 25 | Bill Melchionni | Brooklyn Nets | G | 1969–1976 | The team was then on Long Island as the New York Nets. | |
| 32 | Julius Erving† | Brooklyn Nets | F | 1973–1976 | The team was then on Long Island as the New York Nets. Erving's number was retired by the Nets on April 3, 1987, during his final NBA season as a player with the Philadelphia 76ers. | |
| 52 | Buck Williams | Brooklyn Nets | F | 1981–1989 | The team was then the New Jersey Nets. | |
| 1* | Muggsy Bogues | Charlotte Hornets | G | 1988–1997 | To be retired February 11, 2027. | |
| 13 | Bobby Phills | Charlotte Hornets | G | 1997–2000 | Died in a car crash while playing for the original incarnation of the team. His jersey was retired posthumously. The number was formerly retired by the New Orleans Hornets/Pelicans from 2002 to 2014, after which it was returned and re-retired in Charlotte following the revived Hornets' (originally Bobcats) acquisition of franchise records and history of the original team from 1988 to 2002. | |
| 30 | Dell Curry | Charlotte Hornets | G | 1988–1998 | Also served as broadcaster (2009–present), initially joining the franchise during its second iteration as the Charlotte Bobcats. Jersey retired on March 19, 2026. | |
| 1 | Derrick Rose | Chicago Bulls | G | 2008–2016 | Mascot Benny the Bull wore #1 since debuting in 1969, but remained in circulation for Bulls players to wear, including Rose. Following the retirement of Rose's #1, Benny's jersey was changed to #99. | |
| 4 | Jerry Sloan† | Chicago Bulls | G | 1966–1976 | Also served as head coach (1979–1982). | |
| 10 | Bob Love | Chicago Bulls | F | 1968–1976 | Was Bulls Director of Community Affairs from 1993 until his death in 2024; B. J. Armstrong continued to wear #10 after it was retired for Love on January 14, 1994, doing so until his departure in 1995. | |
| 23 | Michael Jordan† | Chicago Bulls | G | 1984–1993; 1995–1998 | Briefly wore no. 45 in 1995 & 12 for one game in 1990 (due to his jersey being stolen). | |
| 33 | Scottie Pippen† | Chicago Bulls | F | 1987–1998; 2003–2004 | | |
| — | Phil Jackson† (Note: Jackson and Krause do not have actual numbers retired in their honor.) | Chicago Bulls | — | 1989–1998 | As head coach (1989–1998). | |
| — | Jerry Krause† | Chicago Bulls | — | 1985–2003 | As general manager (1985–2003). | |
| — | Johnny Kerr | Chicago Bulls | — | 1966–2009 | As head coach (1966–1968), business manager (1973–1975) and broadcaster (1977–2009). | |
| 0* | Kevin Love | Cleveland Cavaliers | F/C | 2014–2023 | The Cavaliers have announced that Kevin Love's No. 0 jersey will be retired by the organization. | |
| 7 | Bingo Smith | Cleveland Cavaliers | F | 1970–1979 | | |
| 11 | Zydrunas Ilgauskas | Cleveland Cavaliers | C | 1996–2010 | Did not play in 1996–97 and 1999–2000 seasons due to injury. | |
| 22 | Larry Nance | Cleveland Cavaliers | F | 1988–1994 | Briefly wore no. 6 in 1988. Number unretired for his son Larry Nance Jr. from 2018 to 2021, and in the 2025–26 season. | |
| 25 | Mark Price | Cleveland Cavaliers | G | 1986–1995 | | |
| 34 | Austin Carr | Cleveland Cavaliers | G | 1971–1980 | | |
| 42 | Nate Thurmond† | Cleveland Cavaliers | C | 1975–1977 | | |
| 43 | Brad Daugherty | Cleveland Cavaliers | C | 1986–1996 | Did not play in 1994–95 and 1995–96 seasons due to injury. | |
| 🎤 | Joe Tait | Cleveland Cavaliers | — | 1970–1981; 1983–2011 | As broadcaster. | |
| — | Nick Gilbert | Cleveland Cavaliers | — | | Late son of Cavs owner Dan Gilbert | |
| 12 | Derek Harper | Dallas Mavericks | G | 1983–1994; 1996–1997 | | |
| 15 | Brad Davis | Dallas Mavericks | G | 1980–1992 | | |
| 22 | Rolando Blackman | Dallas Mavericks | G | 1981–1992 | | |
| 24 | Mark Aguirre | Dallas Mavericks | F | 1981–1989 | | |
| 41 | Dirk Nowitzki† | Dallas Mavericks | F/C | 1998–2019 | | |
| 2 | Alex English† | Denver Nuggets | F | 1980–1990 | | |
| 12 | Fat Lever | Denver Nuggets | G | 1984–1990 | | |
| 33 | David Thompson† | Denver Nuggets | F | 1975–1982 | | |
| 40 | Byron Beck | Denver Nuggets | C | 1967–1977 | | |
| 44 | Dan Issel† | Denver Nuggets | C | 1975–1985 | Worked a variety roles in the Nuggets organization after retirement, including broadcaster (1988–1992), head coach (1992–1995, 1999–2001), and president/general manager (1998–1999) | |
| 55 | Dikembe Mutombo† | Denver Nuggets | C | 1991–1996 | | |
| 432 | Doug Moe | Denver Nuggets | — | 1980–1990 | As head coach; the number represents his 432 victories coaching the Nuggets. | |
| 1 | Chauncey Billups† | Detroit Pistons | G | 2002–2008; 2013–2014 | Number worn by Reggie Jackson at the time of the announcement, and was allowed to keep it until his departure in 2020. | |
| 2 | Chuck Daly† | Detroit Pistons | — | 1983–1992 | As head coach; the number represents the two NBA championship teams he coached. Number unretired for Cade Cunningham since 2021, with permission from the Daly family. | |
| 3 | Ben Wallace† | Detroit Pistons | C | 2000–2006; 2009–2012 | Number worn by Stanley Johnson at the time of the announcement; switched to No. 7 before the 2016–17 season out of respect to Wallace. Also wore no. 6 from 2009 to 2012. | |
| 4 | Joe Dumars† | Detroit Pistons | G | 1985–1999 | Also served as team president (2000–2014). | |
| 10 | Dennis Rodman† | Detroit Pistons | F | 1986–1993 | Greg Monroe wore the number at the time of the announcement, and was allowed to wear it until his departure in 2015. | |
| 11 | Isiah Thomas† | Detroit Pistons | G | 1981–1994 | Wore no. 42 for one playoff game in 1985 (due to his jersey stolen). | |
| 15 | Vinnie Johnson | Detroit Pistons | G | 1981–1991 | Served as a color analyst on Pistons radio broadcasts (1990–2001) | |
| 16 | Bob Lanier† | Detroit Pistons | C | 1970–1980 | | |
| 21 | Dave Bing† | Detroit Pistons | G | 1966–1975 | Served as the 74th mayor of Detroit (2009–2013) | |
| 32 | Richard Hamilton | Detroit Pistons | G/F | 2002–2011 | | |
| 40 | Bill Laimbeer | Detroit Pistons | C | 1982–1993 | | |
| — | William Davidson† | Detroit Pistons | — | 1974–2009 | As team owner. | |
| — | Jack McCloskey | Detroit Pistons | — | 1979–1992 | As general manager. | |
| 9 | Andre Iguodala | Golden State Warriors | F | 2013–2019; 2021–2023 | Number retired on February 23, 2025. | |
| 11* | Klay Thompson | Golden State Warriors | G | 2011–2024 | The team announced that they will retire Klay Thompson's No. 11 jersey. | |
| 13 | Wilt Chamberlain† | Golden State Warriors | C | 1959–1965 | Team was in Philadelphia (1959–1962) and in San Francisco (1962–1965). Only player to have the same number retired by three different teams (Golden State, L.A. Lakers and Philadelphia) | |
| 14 | Tom Meschery | Golden State Warriors | F | 1961–1967 | Team was in Philadelphia (1961–1962) and San Francisco (1962–1967). | |
| 16 | Al Attles† | Golden State Warriors | G | 1960–1971 | Also served as head coach (1969–1983). | |
| 17 | Chris Mullin† | Golden State Warriors | SG/SF | 1985–1997; 2000–2001 | Also served as Executive Vice President of Basketball Operations (2004–2009). | |
| 24 | Rick Barry† | Golden State Warriors | F | 1965–1967; 1972–1978 | | |
| 42 | Nate Thurmond† | Golden State Warriors | C | 1963–1974 | Team bore the San Francisco name 1963–1971 before adopting the Golden State name starting with the 1971–72 season. | |
| 11 | Yao Ming† | Houston Rockets | C | 2002–2011 | Did not play in 2009–10 season due to injury. | |
| 22 | Clyde Drexler† | Houston Rockets | G | 1995–1998 | Also served as broadcaster (2005–2020). | |
| 23 | Calvin Murphy† | Houston Rockets | G | 1970–1983 | Team was in San Diego (1970–1971). Also served as broadcaster (1985–2004). | |
| 24 | Moses Malone† | Houston Rockets | C | 1976–1982 | Wore no. 21 during the 1976–77 season. | |
| 34 | Hakeem Olajuwon† | Houston Rockets | C | 1984–2001 | | |
| 44 | Elvin Hayes† | Houston Rockets | F | 1968–1972; 1981–1984 | Wore no. 11 from 1968 to 1971; team was in San Diego during that span. | |
| 45 | Rudy Tomjanovich† | Houston Rockets | F | 1970–1981 | Team was in San Diego (1970–1971). Also served as head coach (1991–2003). | |
| CD | Carroll Dawson (Note: Dawson does not have an actual number retired in his honor; rather, a banner with his initials is hanging from the rafters to pay tribute to his 27 years of service to the team.) | Houston Rockets | — | 1980–2007 | As assistant coach (1980–1995) and general manager (1995–2007). | |
| 30 | George McGinnis† | Indiana Pacers | F | 1971–1975; 1980–1982 | | |
| 31 | Reggie Miller† | Indiana Pacers | G | 1987–2005 | | |
| 34 | Mel Daniels† | Indiana Pacers | C | 1967–1974 | Also served as head coach (1988). | |
| 35 | Roger Brown† | Indiana Pacers | F | 1967–1974 | Coming from ABA Pacers. He did not play a match in the NBA. | |
| 529 | Bobby Leonard† | Indiana Pacers | — | 1968–1980 | As head coach; the number represents his 529 victories coaching the Pacers. | |
| 8 | Kobe Bryant† | Los Angeles Lakers | G | 1996–2016 | Only player to have two numbers retired by the same team. | |
| 13 | Wilt Chamberlain† | Los Angeles Lakers | C | 1968–1973 | Only player to have the same number retired by three different teams (Golden State, L.A. Lakers and Philadelphia) | |
| 16 | Pau Gasol† | Los Angeles Lakers | C | 2008–2014 | First pair of siblings, with brother Marc Gasol to have jerseys retired by NBA teams. | |
| 21 | Michael Cooper† | Los Angeles Lakers | G | 1978–1990 | | |
| 22 | Elgin Baylor† | Los Angeles Lakers | F | 1958–1971 | The team was in Minneapolis in his first two seasons (1958–1960). | |
| 24 | Kobe Bryant† | Los Angeles Lakers | G | 2006–2016 | Only player to have two numbers retired by the same team. | |
| 25 | Gail Goodrich† | Los Angeles Lakers | G | 1965–1968; 1970–1976 | Wore no. 11 from 1965 to 1968. Eddie Jones, the last Lakers player to wear no. 25, switched to no. 6 shortly before Goodrich's number was retired. | |
| 32 | Earvin "Magic" Johnson† | Los Angeles Lakers | G | 1979–1991; 1996 | Also served as head coach in 1994, and President of Basketball Operations (2017–2019). | |
| 33 | Kareem Abdul-Jabbar† | Los Angeles Lakers | C | 1975–1989 | | |
| 34 | Shaquille O'Neal† | Los Angeles Lakers | C | 1996–2004 | One of three players to have his jersey retired by three different teams (L.A. Lakers, Miami and Orlando). | |
| 42 | James Worthy† | Los Angeles Lakers | F | 1982–1994 | | |
| 44 | Jerry West† | Los Angeles Lakers | G | 1960–1974 | Also served as head coach (1976–1979) and general manager (1981–2002). | |
| 52 | Jamaal Wilkes† | Los Angeles Lakers | F | 1977–1985 | Born Jackson Keith Wilkes, changed his name to Jamaal Abdul-Lateef in 1975, maintaining his original surname for purposes of public recognition. | |
| 99 | George Mikan† | Los Angeles Lakers | C | 1947–1954; 1956 | Also served as head coach (1957–1958); the team was in Minneapolis throughout his tenure in both roles; team played in both the NBL and BAA before merger into the NBA. | |
| 🎤 | Chick Hearn† | Los Angeles Lakers | — | 1961–2002 | As broadcaster. | |
| 9 | Tony Allen | Memphis Grizzlies | G/F | 2010–2017 | | |
| 11* | Mike Conley | Memphis Grizzlies | G | 2007–2019 | After trading Mike Conley Jr., the team announced they would retire Mike Conley Jr.'s no. 11 jersey | |
| 33 | Marc Gasol | Memphis Grizzlies | F | 2008–2019 | First pair of siblings, with brother Pau Gasol to have jerseys retired by NBA teams. | |
| 50 | Zach Randolph | Memphis Grizzlies | F | 2009–2017 | | |
| 🎤 | Don Poier | Memphis Grizzlies | — | 1995–2005 | As broadcaster | |
| 1 | Chris Bosh† | Miami Heat | F/C | 2010–2017 | Did not play in 2016–17 season due to injury. | |
| 3 | Dwyane Wade† | Miami Heat | G | 2003–2016; 2018–2019 | | |
| 10 | Tim Hardaway† | Miami Heat | G | 1996–2001 | Number unretired for his son Tim Hardaway Jr. in 2026. | |
| 32 | Shaquille O'Neal† | Miami Heat | C | 2004–2008 | One of three players to have his jersey retired by three different teams (L.A. Lakers, Miami and Orlando). | |
| 33 | Alonzo Mourning† | Miami Heat | C | 1995–2003; 2005–2008 | Did not play in 2002–03 season due to injury. Since 2009, Vice President of Player Programs and Development | |
| 40 | Udonis Haslem | Miami Heat | F/C | 2003–2023 | Named Vice President of Basketball Development shortly after retiring from play. | |
| 1 | Oscar Robertson† | Milwaukee Bucks | G | 1970–1974 | Retired October 18, 1974 | |
| 2 | Junior Bridgeman | Milwaukee Bucks | F | 1975–1984; 1986–1987 | | |
| 4 | Sidney Moncrief† | Milwaukee Bucks | G | 1979–1989 | | |
| 8 | Marques Johnson | Milwaukee Bucks | F | 1977–1984 | Television color analyst since 2015. | |
| 10 | Bob Dandridge† | Milwaukee Bucks | F | 1969–1977; 1981 | | |
| 14 | Jon McGlocklin | Milwaukee Bucks | G | 1968–1976 | Also served as broadcaster (1985–2018). | |
| 16 | Bob Lanier† | Milwaukee Bucks | C | 1980–1984 | | |
| 32 | Brian Winters | Milwaukee Bucks | G | 1975–1983 | | |
| 33 | Kareem Abdul-Jabbar† | Milwaukee Bucks | C | 1969–1975 | Served under the name of Lew Alcindor for two seasons before becoming Kareem Abdul-Jabbar. | |
| 34* | Giannis Antetokounmpo | Milwaukee Bucks | F/C | 2013-2026 | The team announced that Giannis Antetokounmpo's No. 34 will be retired by the organization. | |
| 2 | Malik Sealy | Minnesota Timberwolves | F | 1997–2000 | Died in a car crash while playing for the team. His jersey was retired posthumously. | |
| 21* | Kevin Garnett† | Minnesota Timberwolves | F | 1995–2007, 2015-2016 | The Timberwolves will retire Kevin Garnett's No. 21 jersey on February 28, 2027. | |
| Flip | Flip Saunders | Minnesota Timberwolves | — | 1995–2005; 2014–2015 | As Head coach. | |
| 7 | Pete Maravich† | New Orleans Pelicans | G | — | Never played for the franchise, jersey retired for his contributions to basketball of Louisiana. He played for the New Orleans Jazz (now the Utah Jazz) 1974–1979 in NBA and for LSU Tigers 1967–1970 in NCAA. One of three players to have his jersey retired by three different teams (Atlanta, New Orleans, Utah) | |
| 10 | Walt Frazier† | New York Knicks | G | 1967–1977 | Also served as a broadcaster. | |
| 12 | Dick Barnett† | New York Knicks | G | 1965–1973 | | |
| 15 | Earl Monroe† | New York Knicks | G | 1971–1980 | Wore no. 33 for a few games in the 1971–72 season. | |
| 15 | Dick McGuire† | New York Knicks | G | 1949–1957 | Also served as head coach (1965–1968) and scouting director. | |
| 19 | Willis Reed† | New York Knicks | C | 1964–1974 | Also served as head coach (1977–1978). | |
| 22 | Dave DeBusschere† | New York Knicks | F | 1968–1974 | Also served as general manager (1982–1986). | |
| 24 | Bill Bradley† | New York Knicks | F | 1967–1977 | From 1979 to 1997, US Senator (D) from New Jersey | |
| 33 | Patrick Ewing† | New York Knicks | C | 1985–2000 | | |
| 613 | Red Holzman† | New York Knicks | — | 1967–1977; 1978–1982 | As head coach; the number represents his 613 victories coaching the Knicks. | |
| 0* | Russell Westbrook | Oklahoma City Thunder | G | 2008–2019 | Originally drafted by the Seattle SuperSonics shortly before the franchise relocated to Oklahoma City. To be retired on February 7, 2027 | |
| 4 | Nick Collison | Oklahoma City Thunder | F/C | 2003–2018 | Did not play in 2003–04 season due to injury. The team was in Seattle (Seattle SuperSonics) in his first five seasons (2003–2008). | |
| 6 | Sixth man | Orlando Magic | — | — | Temporarily unretired for Patrick Ewing during the 2001–02 season, as his customary no. 33 was worn by Grant Hill. | |
| 32 | Shaquille O'Neal† | Orlando Magic | C | 1992–1996 | One of three players to have his jersey retired by three different teams (L.A. Lakers, Miami and Orlando). | |
| 2 | Moses Malone† | Philadelphia 76ers | C | 1982–1986; 1993–1994 | | |
| 3 | Allen Iverson† | Philadelphia 76ers | G | 1996–2006; 2009–2010 | | |
| 4 | Dolph Schayes† | Philadelphia 76ers | F/C | 1949–1964 | Team was known as the Syracuse Nationals (1948–1963). Also served as player-coach (1963–66). Number retired posthumously. Nerlens Noel wore the number at the time of the announcement, and was allowed to wear it until his departure in 2017. Wore No. 55 for part of the 1949–50 season. | |
| 6 | Julius Erving† | Philadelphia 76ers | F | 1976–1987 | | |
| 10 | Maurice Cheeks† | Philadelphia 76ers | G | 1978–1989 | Also served as head coach (2005–2008). | |
| 13 | Wilt Chamberlain† | Philadelphia 76ers | C | 1965–1968 | Only player to have the same number retired by three different teams (Golden State, L.A. Lakers and Philadelphia). | |
| 15 | Hal Greer† | Philadelphia 76ers | G | 1958–1973 | During his first five seasons (1958–1963), the team was known as the Syracuse Nationals. | |
| 24 | Bobby Jones† | Philadelphia 76ers | F | 1978–1986 | On January 28, 2020, jersey was temporarily, with Jones' permission, issued to Joel Embiid as a tribute to Kobe Bryant. | |
| 32 | Billy Cunningham | Philadelphia 76ers | F | 1965–1972; 1974–1975 | Also served as head coach (1977–1985); briefly un-retired for Charles Barkley in the 1991–92 season. | |
| 34 | Charles Barkley† | Philadelphia 76ers | F | 1984–1992 | Also wore #32 during the 1991–92 season as a tribute to Magic Johnson (see Billy Cunningham). | |
| 🎤 | Dave Zinkoff | Philadelphia 76ers | — | 1963–1981; 1983–1985 | As P.A. announcer. | |
| 5 | Dick Van Arsdale | Phoenix Suns | G | 1968–1977 | Also served as head coach (1987). | |
| 6 | Walter Davis† | Phoenix Suns | G | 1977–1988 | | |
| 7 | Kevin Johnson | Phoenix Suns | G | 1987–1998; 2000 | Retired in 1998, but came back before the end of the 1999–2000 season before retiring again; Served as the 55th mayor of Sacramento (2008–2016). | |
| 9 | Dan Majerle | Phoenix Suns | G/F | 1988–1995; 2001–2002 | Number was previously only considered "honored" by the Suns on March 9, 2003, before considered properly retired by the franchise on October 28, 2023. | |
| 13 | Steve Nash† | Phoenix Suns | G | 1996–1998; 2004–2012 | Number was previously only considered "honored" by the Suns on October 30, 2015, before considered properly retired by the franchise on October 28, 2023. | |
| 24 | Tom Chambers | Phoenix Suns | F | 1988–1993 | Number was previously only considered "honored" by the Suns on April 18, 1999 (as noted with Tom Gugliotta wearing Chambers' number while with the Suns from 1999 until 2004) before considered properly retired by the franchise on October 28, 2023. | |
| 31 | Shawn Marion | Phoenix Suns | F | 1999–2008 | | |
| 32 | Amar'e Stoudemire† | Phoenix Suns | F | 2002–2010 | Wore no. 1 from 2006 to 2010. | |
| 33 (Note: Although No. 33 is retired, Grant Hill received permission from Adams to wear it during his time with the Suns.) | Alvan Adams | Phoenix Suns | C | 1975–1988 | Number unretired for Grant Hill from 2007 to 2013. | |
| 34 | Charles Barkley† | Phoenix Suns | F | 1992–1996 | Number was previously only considered "honored" by the Suns on March 20, 2004, before considered properly retired by the franchise on October 28, 2023. | |
| 42 | Connie Hawkins† | Phoenix Suns | F | 1968–1974 | | |
| 44 | Paul Westphal† | Phoenix Suns | G | 1975–1980; 1983–1984 | Also served as head coach (1992–1996). | |
| — | Jerry Colangelo† | Phoenix Suns | — | 1968–2005 | As owner, executive, and head coach (1970; 1972–73). | |
| — | Cotton Fitzsimmons† | Phoenix Suns | — | 1970–1972; 1988–1992; 1996 | As head coach; inducted in the Suns' Ring of Honor posthumously. | |
| — | John MacLeod | Phoenix Suns | — | 1973–1987 | As head coach. Also served as assistant head coach in the 1999–2000 NBA season. | |
| — | Joe Proski | Phoenix Suns | — | 1968–2000 | As athletic trainer. | |
| 🎤 | Al McCoy | Phoenix Suns | — | 1972–2023 | As broadcaster | |
| 1 | Larry Weinberg | Portland Trail Blazers | — | 1970–1988 | As team founder and owner; number still available (most notably worn by Rod Strickland, Derek Anderson, Jarrett Jack, Evan Turner and Anfernee Simons). | |
| 13 | Dave Twardzik | Portland Trail Blazers | G | 1976–1981 | | |
| 14 | Lionel Hollins | Portland Trail Blazers | G | 1975–1981 | | |
| 15 | Larry Steele | Portland Trail Blazers | G | 1971–1981 | | |
| 20 | Maurice Lucas | Portland Trail Blazers | F | 1976–1981; 1987–1988 | | |
| 22 | Clyde Drexler† | Portland Trail Blazers | G | 1983–1995 | | |
| 30 | Terry Porter | Portland Trail Blazers | G | 1985–1995 | | |
| 30 | Bob Gross | Portland Trail Blazers | F | 1975–1982 | | |
| 32 | Bill Walton† | Portland Trail Blazers | C | 1974–1979 | Did not play in 1978–79 season due to injury. | |
| 36 | Lloyd Neal | Portland Trail Blazers | C | 1972–1979 | | |
| 45 | Geoff Petrie | Portland Trail Blazers | G | 1970–1976 | | |
| 77 | Jack Ramsay† | Portland Trail Blazers | — | 1976–1986 | As head coach; the number represents the 1977 NBA Championship he won while coaching the Blazers. | |
| 🎤 | Bill Schonely | Portland Trail Blazers | — | 1970–1998 | As Broadcaster | |
| 1 | Nate Archibald† | Sacramento Kings | G | 1970–1976 | During his career with the team, it was known first as the Cincinnati Royals (1970–1972), then the Kansas City–Omaha Kings (1972–1975), and finally as the Kansas City Kings (1975–1976). He wore no. 10 from 1970 to 1974. | |
| 2 | Mitch Richmond† | Sacramento Kings | G | 1991–1998 | | |
| 4 | Chris Webber† | Sacramento Kings | F | 1998–2005 | | |
| 6 | Sixth man | Sacramento Kings | | | | |
| 11 | Bob Davies† | Sacramento Kings | G | 1948–1955 | Also played for the NBL and BAA before merger into the NBA. The team was then known as the Rochester Royals. Unretired for Domantas Sabonis starting with the 2024–25 season, with blessing from the Davies family. | |
| 12 | Maurice Stokes† | Sacramento Kings | F | 1955–1958 | The team was known as the Rochester Royals (1955–1957) and moved to Cincinnati starting with the 1957–58 season in which his career was ended by a crippling head injury. | |
| 14 | Oscar Robertson† | Sacramento Kings | G | 1960–1970 | The team was then known as the Cincinnati Royals. | |
| 16 | Peja Stojakovic | Sacramento Kings | F | 1999–2006 | Director of player personnel and development (2015), assistant General Manager (2018) | |
| 21 | Vlade Divac† | Sacramento Kings | C | 1999–2004 | Vice president and general manager of basketball operations (2015–2020) | |
| 27 | Jack Twyman† | Sacramento Kings | F | 1955–1966 | The team was known as the Rochester Royals (1955–1957) and then as the Cincinnati Royals for the remainder of his career. | |
| 44 | Sam Lacey | Sacramento Kings | C | 1970–1981 | During his career with the team, it was known first as the Cincinnati Royals (1970–1972), then the Kansas City–Omaha Kings (1972–1975), and finally as the Kansas City Kings (1975–1981). | |
| 00 | Johnny Moore | San Antonio Spurs | G | 1980–1987; 1989–1990 | | |
| 6 | Avery Johnson | San Antonio Spurs | G | 1991; 1992–1993; 1994–2001 | Wore no. 15 during his first stint with the Spurs (1991). | |
| 9 | Tony Parker† | San Antonio Spurs | G | 2001–2018 | | |
| 12 | Bruce Bowen | San Antonio Spurs | F | 2001–2009 | Unretired for LaMarcus Aldridge from 2015 to 2021. | |
| 13 | James Silas | San Antonio Spurs | G | 1973–1981 | | |
| 20 | Manu Ginobili† | San Antonio Spurs | G | 2002–2018 | | |
| 21 | Tim Duncan† | San Antonio Spurs | F/C | 1997–2016 | Assistant coach from 2019 to 2020. | |
| 32 | Sean Elliott | San Antonio Spurs | F | 1989–1993; 1994–2001 | Currently serves as a Spurs' TV color analyst (2004–present) | |
| 44 | George Gervin† | San Antonio Spurs | G | 1974–1985 | | |
| 50 | David Robinson† | San Antonio Spurs | C | 1989–2003 | | |
| 1,390 | Gregg Popovich† | San Antonio Spurs | | 1996–2025 | As head coach; the number represents his 1390 victories coaching the Spurs. | |
| 1 (Note: As a result of the Seattle SuperSonics relocation to Oklahoma City in 2008, the SuperSonics' history (including retired numbers) is shared with the Oklahoma City Thunder, although the team colors, uniforms and logos remain available for use by a future NBA team in Seattle.) | Gus Williams | Seattle SuperSonics | G | 1976–1985 | | |
| 10 | Nate McMillan | Seattle SuperSonics | G | 1985–1998 | Played for the Seattle SuperSonics and served as their head coach (2000–2005). | |
| 19 | Lenny Wilkens† | Seattle SuperSonics | G | 1968–1972 | Played for the Seattle SuperSonics and served as their head coach (1969–1972; 1977–1985), and as a broadcaster (2006–2008). | |
| 24 | Spencer Haywood† | Seattle SuperSonics | F | 1971–1975 | | |
| 32 | Fred Brown | Seattle SuperSonics | G | 1971–1984 | | |
| 43 | Jack Sikma† | Seattle SuperSonics | C | 1977–1986 | Also served as assistant coach (2003–2007). | |
| 🎤 | Bob Blackburn | Seattle SuperSonics | — | 1967–1992 | Announcer for the Seattle SuperSonics. | |
| 7* | Kyle Lowry | Toronto Raptors | G | 2012-2021 | The Raptors will retire Kyle Lowry’s No. 7 jersey on January 10th, 2027. | |
| 15 | Vince Carter† | Toronto Raptors | G/F | 1998–2004 | His number was retired on November 2, 2024, during halftime when the team played the Sacramento Kings | |
| 1 | Frank Layden | Utah Jazz | — | 1981–1988 | As head coach; also served as team president (1988–1998). | |
| 4 | Adrian Dantley† | Utah Jazz | F | 1979–1986 | | |
| 7 | Pete Maravich† | Utah Jazz | G | 1974–1980 | The team was in New Orleans 1974–1979. He also played 17 games of the 1979–80 season after the team moved to Salt Lake City. Wore no. 44 in the 1974–75 season. One of three players to have his jersey retired by three different teams (Atlanta, New Orleans, Utah) | |
| 9 | Larry Miller | Utah Jazz | — | 1985–2009 | As owner. | |
| 12 | John Stockton† | Utah Jazz | G | 1984–2003 | | |
| 14 | Jeff Hornacek | Utah Jazz | G | 1994–2000 | Also served as assistant coach (2011–2013). | |
| 32 | Karl Malone† | Utah Jazz | F | 1985–2003 | | |
| 35 | Darrell Griffith | Utah Jazz | G | 1980–1991 | | |
| 53 | Mark Eaton | Utah Jazz | C | 1982–1993 | | |
| 1,223 | Jerry Sloan† | Utah Jazz | — | 1988–2011 | As head coach; the number represents his 1223 victories coaching the Jazz. | |
| 🎤 | Hot Rod Hundley | Utah Jazz | — | 1974–2009 | As broadcaster. | |
| 10 | Earl Monroe† | Washington Wizards | G | 1967–1971 | The team was then known as the Baltimore Bullets. Wore no. 33 during the 1967–68 season. | |
| 11 | Elvin Hayes† | Washington Wizards | F | 1972–1981 | When he joined the team, it was known as the Baltimore Bullets. After one season, the team moved to Landover, Maryland, adopting the name of Capital Bullets for the 1973–74 season before being known as the Washington Bullets. | |
| 25 | Gus Johnson† | Washington Wizards | F | 1963–1972 | The team was then known as the Baltimore Bullets. | |
| 41 | Wes Unseld† | Washington Wizards | C | 1968–1981 | When he started his career with the team, it was known as the Baltimore Bullets. In 1973, the team moved to Landover, Maryland, adopting the name of Capital Bullets for the 1973–74 season before being known as the Washington Bullets. Also served as head coach (1987–1994), as well as three stints in the team's front office (vice president, 1981–1987; general manager, 1996–1999, 2003); the team did not adopt the Wizards nickname until the 1997–98 season. | |
| 45 | Phil Chenier | Washington Wizards | G | 1971–1979 | When he joined the team, it was known as the Baltimore Bullets. After two seasons, the team moved to Landover, Maryland, adopting the name of Capital Bullets for the 1973–74 season before being known as the Washington Bullets. Also served as broadcaster (1984–2017). | |
| 23 | micheal jordan | | sg | 2002-2003 | | |

=== Honored numbers ===
Cleveland has introduced in 2019 a Wall of Honor, which honors former players and other personnel.

Phoenix also previously honored numbers from 1999 until 2023 during their Ring of Honor ceremonies.

Chicago has introduced a Ring of Honor in January 2024, with all of the previously retired numbers and banners, plus other significant personnel in Bulls' history, as well as one full team.

The Lakers have also honored their most notable players during the stint of the franchise in Minneapolis. Although their numbers are displayed on the banners, only the No. 22 and No. 34 are officially retired, since they were retired for Elgin Baylor and Shaquille O'Neal respectively. George Mikan was also promoted from being an honored number for his time with the Minneapolis Lakers to being retired by the Los Angeles Lakers properly on October 30, 2022.

NBA honored numbers
| No. | Name | Team | Pos. | Years with franchise | Note | Refs |
|---|---|---|---|---|---|---|
| 2 | Norm Van Lier | Chicago Bulls | G | 1971–1978 | Class of 2025. Other roles in the Bulls organization: Radio Analyst: 1981-82 / TV Analyst: 1992-2009 | |
| 5 | John Paxson | Chicago Bulls | G | 1985–1994 | Class of 2025. Other roles in the Bulls organization: Assistant Coach: 1995-96 / Broadcaster: 1996-2003 / General Manager: 2003-2020 / Senior Advisor: 2020-Present | |
| 7 | Toni Kukoč† | Chicago Bulls | F | 1993–2000 | Class of 2024 | |
| 24 | Bill Cartwright | Chicago Bulls | C | 1988–1994 | Class of 2025. Other roles in the Bulls organization: Assistant Coach: 1996-2001 / Head Coach: 2001-03 | |
| 25 | Chet Walker† | Chicago Bulls | F | 1969–1975 | Class of 2024 | |
| 53 | Artis Gilmore† | Chicago Bulls | C | 1976–1982; 1987 | Class of 2024 | |
| 54 | Horace Grant | Chicago Bulls | F | 1987–1994 | Class of 2025 | |
| 91 | Dennis Rodman† | Chicago Bulls | F | 1995–1998 | Class of 2024 | |
| — | Dick Klein | Chicago Bulls | — | 1967-1972 | Class of 2024. As owner | |
| — | Tex Winter† | Chicago Bulls | — | 1985-1999 | Class of 2024. As Assistant Coach | |
| — | Johnny Bach | Chicago Bulls | — | 1988-1994, 2003-2004 | Class of 2025. As Assistant Coach | |
| — | Neil Funk | Chicago Bulls | — | 1991-2020 | Class of 2025. As broadcaster | |
| 1, 11 | Terrell Brandon | Cleveland Cavaliers | PG | 1991–1997 | Class of 2024 | |
| 18 | John "Hot Rod" Williams | Cleveland Cavaliers | F/C | 1986–1995 | Class of 2019 | |
| 20, 4 | Campy Russell | Cleveland Cavaliers | F | 1974–1980, 1984 | Class of 2022. Broadcaster. Cavalier's Director of Alumni Relations | |
| 21 | World B. Free | Cleveland Cavaliers | G | 1982–1986 | Class of 2022 | |
| 22 | Jim Chones | Cleveland Cavaliers | C | 1974–1979 | Class of 2024. Television color analyst for the Cavs, 1983-1994. Radio post-game analyst since 2007. | |
| 30 | Mike Mitchell | Cleveland Cavaliers | SF | 1978–1981 | Class of 2024 | |
| 32 | John Johnson | Cleveland Cavaliers | F | 1970–1973 | Class of 2019 | |
| — | Wayne Embry† | Cleveland Cavaliers | — | 1986–1999 | Class of 2019. As General manager; first African-American sports team general manager | |
| — | Bill Fitch† | Cleveland Cavaliers | — | 1970–1979 | Class of 2019. Original general manager and coach | |
| — | Lenny Wilkens† | Cleveland Cavaliers | — | 1986–1993 | Class of 2022. As head Coach | |
| — | Nick Mileti | Cleveland Cavaliers | — | 1970–1980 | Class of 2019. Original owner of the team | |
| — | Gordon Gund | Cleveland Cavaliers | — | 1983–2005 | Class of 2022. As owner | |
| — | Chuck Broski | Cleveland Cavaliers | — | 1970–present | Class of 2024. As stats crew chief | |
| 17 | Jim Pollard† (Note: Numbers hang to the rafters as honored Minneapolis Lakers. These five Hall-of-Famers were instrumental to the franchise's success during its days in Minneapolis. Except for 22, which was retired for Baylor, and 34, which was retired for O'Neal, these "honored numbers" are still available.) | Los Angeles Lakers | F | 1948–1955 | Also served as head coach (1960); the team was in Minneapolis throughout his tenure in both roles. | |
| 19 | Vern Mikkelsen† | Los Angeles Lakers | F | 1949–1959 | Team was then in Minneapolis. | |
| 22 | Slater Martin† | Los Angeles Lakers | G | 1949–1956 | Team was then in Minneapolis. | |
| 34 | Clyde Lovellette† | Los Angeles Lakers | F/C | 1953–1957 | Team was then in Minneapolis. | |
| — | John Kundla† | Los Angeles Lakers | — | 1948–1959 | As head coach (1948–1957, 1958–1959); the team was in Minneapolis. | |

== One player, multiple teams ==
A handful of players who had notable careers for multiple teams have had their numbers retired by each team. Bill Russell (whose number was retired league-wide), Michael Jordan, and Pete Maravich had their numbers retired by teams they never played for.

- Kareem Abdul-Jabbar had his no. 33 retired by both the Bucks and Lakers.
- Charles Barkley had his no. 34 retired by both the 76ers and Suns.
- Vince Carter had his no. 15 jersey retired by the Raptors and the Nets.
- Wilt Chamberlain had his no. 13 retired by the Warriors, 76ers, and Lakers. To date, he is one of only three players to have his jersey retired by 3 different teams, alongside Pete Maravich and Shaquille O'Neal.
- Clyde Drexler had his no. 22 retired by both the Trail Blazers and Rockets.
- Kevin Garnett had his no. 5 retired by the Celtics, and his no. 21 is scheduled to be retired by the Timberwolves.
- Julius Erving had his no. 32 retired by the Nets, and his no. 6 retired by the 76ers.
- Elvin Hayes had his no. 11 retired by the Wizards, and his no. 44 by the Rockets.
- Michael Jordan had his no. 23 retired by both the Bulls and Heat. Jordan is one of three players to have his jersey retired by a team he never played for.
- Bob Lanier had his no. 16 retired by both the Pistons and Bucks.
- Moses Malone has his no. 24 retired by the Rockets, while his no. 2 is retired by the 76ers.
- Pete Maravich had his no. 44 retired by the Hawks, while his no. 7 is retired by both the Jazz and Pelicans. Maravich is one of three players to have his jersey retired by three different teams, alongside Wilt Chamberlain and Shaquille O'Neal.
- Earl Monroe had his no. 15 retired by the Knicks, and his no. 10 by the Wizards.
- Dikembe Mutombo had his no. 55 retired by both the Nuggets and Hawks.
- Shaquille O'Neal had his no. 34 retired by the Lakers, and his no. 32 by both the Heat and the Magic. O'Neal is one of three players to have his jersey retired by three different teams, alongside Wilt Chamberlain and Pete Maravich.
- Oscar Robertson had his no. 14 retired by the Kings, and his no. 1 by the Bucks.
- Dennis Rodman had his no. 10 retired by the Pistons, and his no. 91 appears in the Bulls' Ring of Honor .
- On August 11, 2022, 12 days after his death, Bill Russell had his no. 6 retired league-wide, the first and thus far only NBA player to receive the honor. Russell had previously had his number retired by the Celtics on March 12, 1972.
- Jerry Sloan had his no. 4 retired by the Bulls, and no. 1,223 by the Jazz, signifying his total victories as their coach.
- Nate Thurmond had his no. 42 retired by both the Warriors and Cavaliers.
- Lenny Wilkens had his no. 19 retired by the Sonics, and his name appears in the Cavaliers' Wall of Honor.

== One team, multiple players ==
The following numbers have been retired by a single team in honor of multiple players:

- New York Knicks' no. 15 retired for Earl Monroe in 1986 and Dick McGuire in 1992.
- Portland Trail Blazers' no. 30 retired for Bob Gross and Terry Porter in 2008.
- Before the league-wide retirement of Bill Russell’s no. 6 in 2022, several teams have already retired the number for different players and honors:
  - The Kings in 1985 and Magic in 1989 retired the number in honor of the Sixth Man/the fans
  - The 76ers retired the number for Julius Erving in 1987.
  - The Suns retired the number for Walter Davis in 1994.
  - The Spurs retired the number for Avery Johnson in 2007.

== One player, one team, multiple numbers ==
The following numbers have been retired by a single team in honor of one player:

- Los Angeles Lakers' nos. 8 and 24 retired for Kobe Bryant in 2017.

== See also ==
- NBA anniversary teams
- List of NCAA men's basketball retired numbers
