= List of Denver Nuggets head coaches =

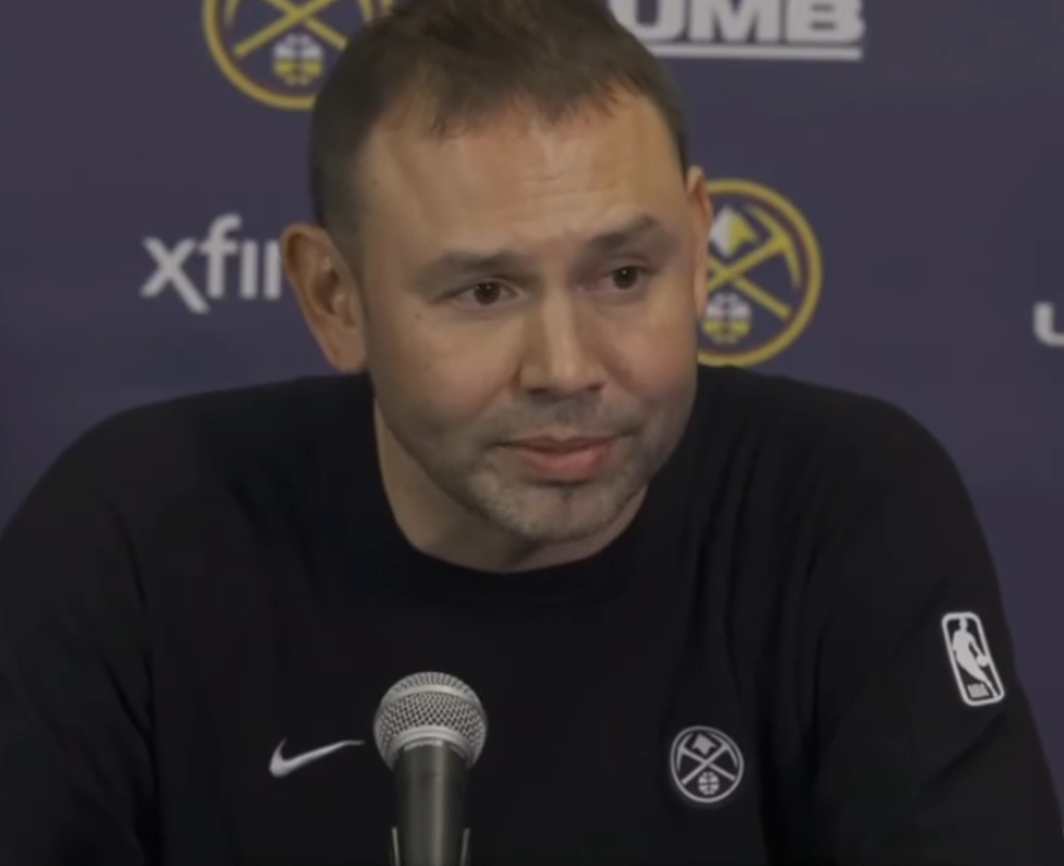
David Adelman is the current head coach of the Denver Nuggets

The Denver Nuggets are an American professional basketball team based in Denver, Colorado. They play in the Northwest Division of the Western Conference in the National Basketball Association (NBA). The Nuggets were founded as the Denver Rockets of the American Basketball Association (ABA) in 1967. In 1974, in anticipation of moving to the NBA, the franchise held a contest to choose a new trademarked name for the team, as Rockets was already in use by the Houston Rockets and the name Nuggets won. In 1976, the ABA folded, and the NBA decided to admit four ABA teams into the league, including the Nuggets, the San Antonio Spurs, the Indiana Pacers, and the New York Nets.

There have been 22 head coaches for the Nuggets franchise. The franchise's first head coach was Bob Bass, who led the team to the division semifinals, losing to the New Orleans Buccaneers. Doug Moe (1988) and George Karl (2013) are the only Nuggets coaches to win the NBA Coach of the Year Award. Michael Malone is the franchise's all-time leader in both regular season and playoff wins. Larry Brown & George Karl are the only Nuggets coaches to be inducted into the Basketball Hall of Fame, although John McLendon was inducted as a contributor, but not a coach. In 1976, Brown coached the Nuggets to the team's only ABA championship game. John McLendon, Joe Belmont, Donnie Walsh, Dan Issel, Bill Hanzlik, Mike Evans, Jeff Bzdelik, Michael Cooper, and Brian Shaw spent their entire NBA coaching careers with the Nuggets.

== Key ==
GC	Games coached
W	Wins
L	Losses
Win%	Winning percentage
#	Number of coaches^{[a]}
*	Spent entire NBA head coaching career with the Nuggets
†	Elected to the Basketball Hall of Fame as a coach

== Coaches ==
Note: Statistics are correct of the 2025–26 season.

#	Name	Term^{[b]}	GC	W	L	Win%	GC	W	L	Win%	Achievements	Reference
#	Name	Term^{[b]}	Regular season				Playoffs				Achievements	Reference
Denver Rockets
1	Bob Bass	1967–1969	156	89	67	.571	12	5	7	.417		
2	John McLendon*	1969	28	9	19	.321	—	—	—	—		
3	Joe Belmont*	1969–1970	69	45	24	.652	12	5	7	.417		
4	Stan Albeck	1970–1971	71	27	44	.380	—	—	—	—		
5	Alex Hannum	1971–1974	252	118	134	.468	12	4	8	.333		
Denver Nuggets
6	Larry Brown†	1974–1979	385	251	134	.652	45	21	24	.467	Led team to and lost 1975–76 ABA Finals	
7	Donnie Walsh*	1979–1980	142	60	82	.423	3	1	2	.333		
8	Doug Moe	1980–1990	789	432	357	.548	61	24	37	.393	1987–88 NBA Coach of the Year	
9	Paul Westhead	1990–1992	164	44	120	.268	—	—	—	—		
10	Dan Issel*	1992–1995	198	96	102	.485	12	6	6	.500		
11	Gene Littles	1995	16	3	13	.188	—	—	—	—		
12	Bernie Bickerstaff	1995–1996	127	59	68	.465	3	0	3	.000		
13	Dick Motta	1996–1997	69	17	52	.246	—	—	—	—		
14	Bill Hanzlik*	1997–1998	82	11	71	.134	—	—	—	—		
15	Mike D'Antoni	1998–1999	50	14	36	.280	—	—	—	—		
—	Dan Issel*	1999–2001	190	84	106	.442	—	—	—	—		
16	Mike Evans*	2001–2002	56	18	38	.321	—	—	—	—		
17	Jeff Bzdelik*	2002–2004	192	73	119	.380	5	1	4	.200		
18	Michael Cooper*	2004	14	4	10	.286	—	—	—	—		
19	George Karl†	2004–2013	680	423	257	.622	59	21	38	.356	2012–13 NBA Coach of the Year	
20	Brian Shaw*	2013–2015	141	56	85	.397	—	—	—	—		
21	Melvin Hunt*	2015	23	10	13	.435	—	—	—	—		
22	Michael Malone	2015–2025	798	471	327	.590	80	44	36	.550	NBA championship (2023)	
23	David Adelman*	2025–present	85	57	28	.671	14	7	7	.500		

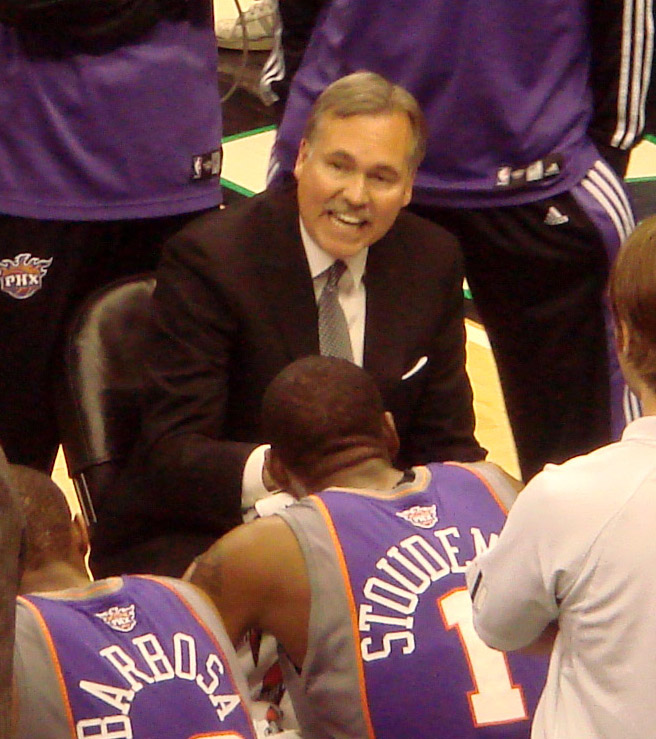
Mike D'Antoni coached the Denver Nuggets for 50 games during the 1998–99 NBA season.

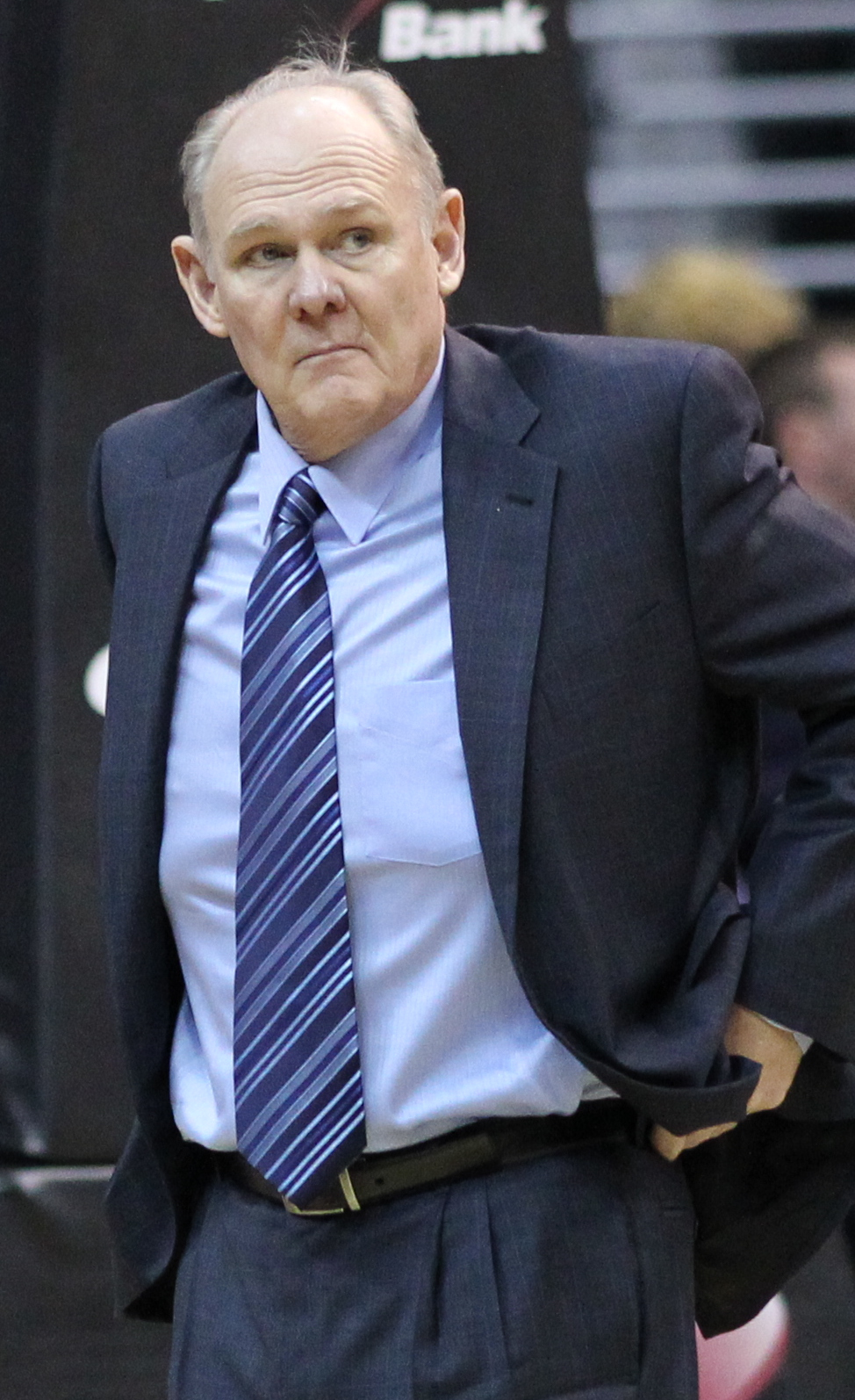
George Karl was the 2004–2013 Denver Nuggets head coach.

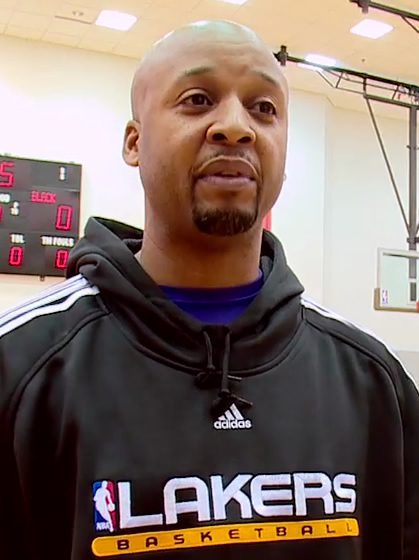
Brian Shaw was the 2013–2015 Denver Nuggets head coach.

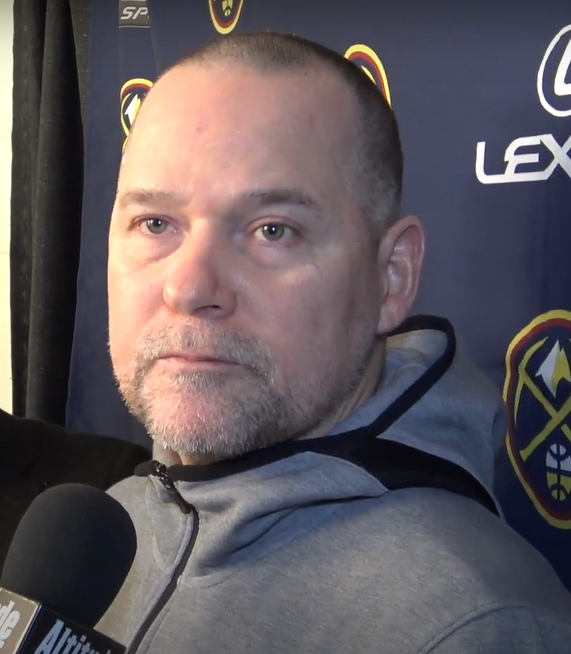
Michael Malone was the 2015–2025 Denver Nuggets head coach.

== Notes ==
- ^{a} A running total of the number of coaches of the Nuggets. Thus any coach who has two or more separate terms as head coach is only counted once.
- ^{b} Each year is linked to an article about that particular NBA season, except for the seasons spent in the ABA.
