= Sixth man (fans) =

Basketball team supporters

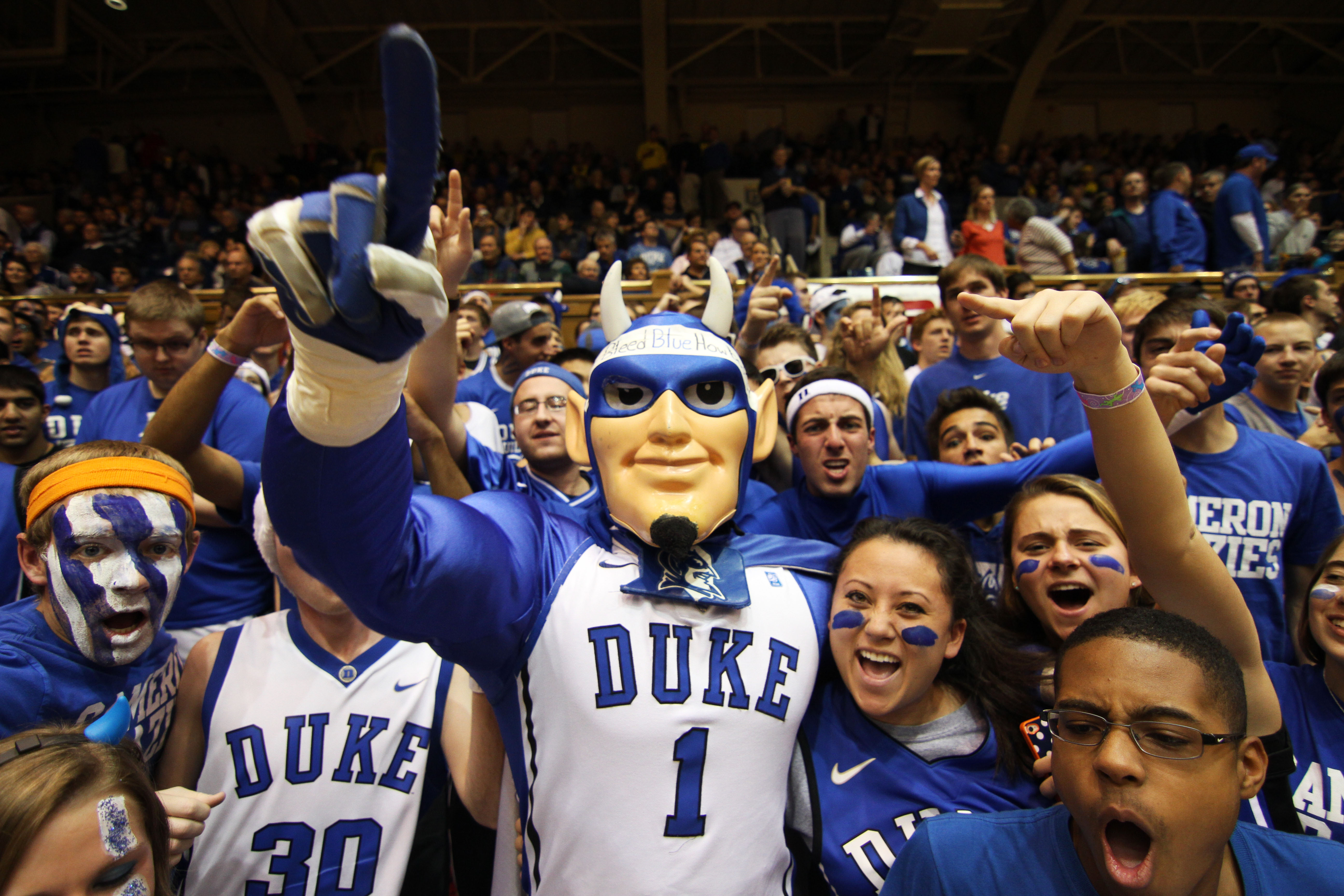
The Cameron Crazies of Duke University

In college, high school and NBA basketball, the sixth man is the fans attempting to influence the game by cheering and chanting for their team of choice. The fan section is referred to as the "sixth man", because they are considered the sixth "player" of their basketball team. High school and college student sections are numerous across the United States, and many share the same characteristics.

== College basketball ==
Sixth man clubs originated in college basketball, where deep crowds of students assemble to chant for their team. Quality sixth man squads attend home and away games to support their team. These student sections are strong parts of the game experience, and run the gamut from the Duke's infamous Cameron Crazies to the University of Illinois' altruistic Orange Krush. Many create identical shirts to appear unified and even more numerous. Sixth man clubs name themselves based on their school mascot or color. These student sections are known for their creativity in chants, intimidation tactics to distract the opposing team, and their creativity in raiding away games.

== High school basketball ==
Sixth man squads assemble themselves together across the United States. Like their collegiate counterparts, high school squads wear matching shirts and name themselves based on their mascot. High school sixth man clubs are able to have the largest impact on the games because the size of the gymnasium is much smaller than its college counterpart. Sixth man squads organize themselves sometimes inches away from the court and work to intimidate their opponents personally. Player-fan interactions occur a lot because of this. This can sometimes backfire, as was the case with former Wisconsin high school player and future NBA player Tyler Herro. Herro, born and raised in Wisconsin, originally committed to play for the University of Wisconsin but later changed his mind and committed to the University of Kentucky. Knowing this, a home crowd's sixth man chanted "Traitor" at him during a road game and Herro responded with a 45 point game and led his team to a road victory.

== Goals and rituals ==
The "sixth man" has taken the role of cheering to a higher and more intense level. The main goal is to be so loud that their team gets pumped up, and the opposing team gets intimidated. Most squads choose to stand up during the whole game. Many squads put their hands in the air whenever their team is shooting a free throw for good luck.

== See also ==
- 12th man (football)
