= List of Chicago Bulls head coaches =

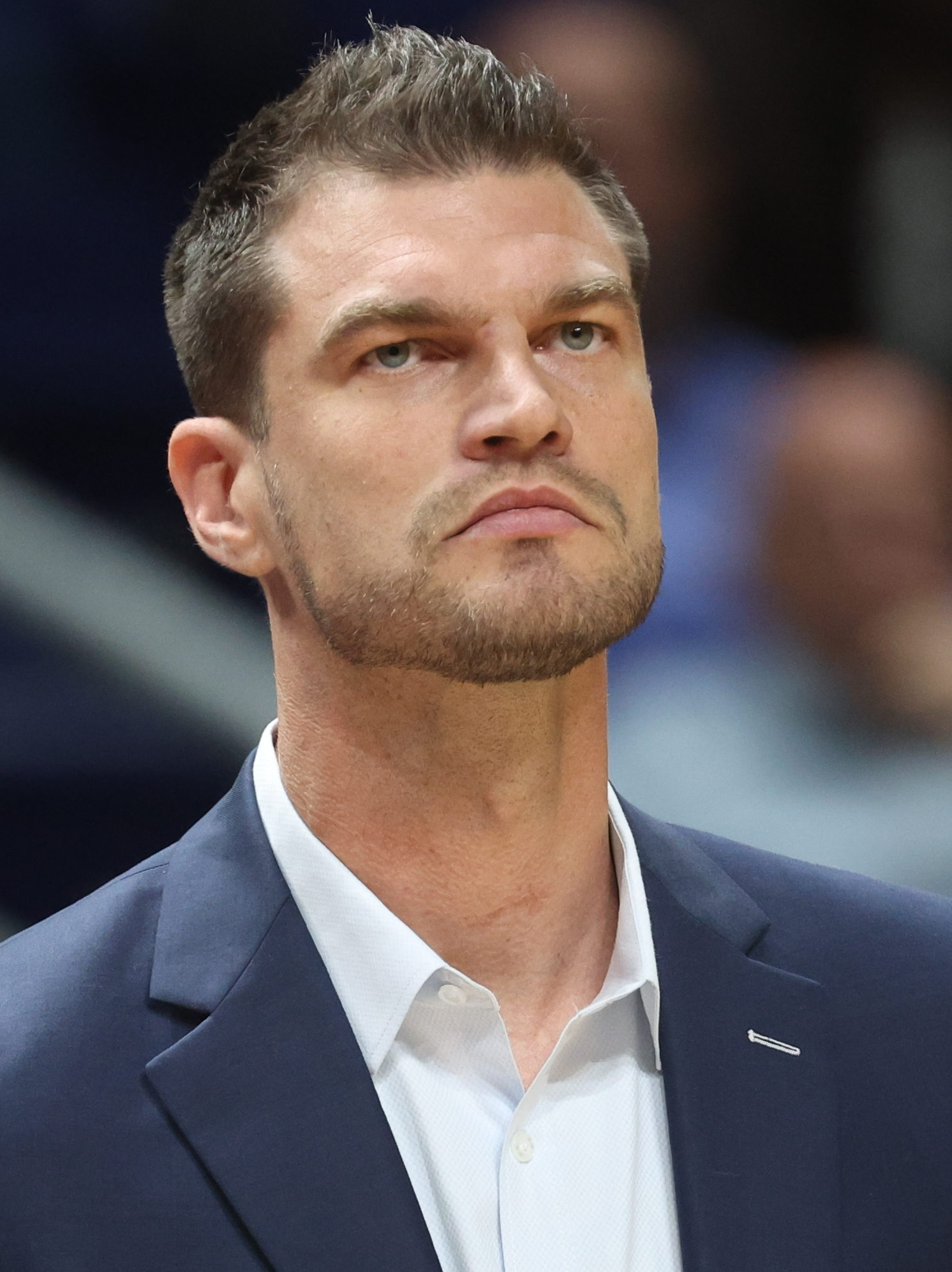
Tiago Splitter is the current head coach of the Chicago Bulls

The Chicago Bulls are an American professional basketball team based in Chicago, Illinois. They are a member of the Central Division of the Eastern Conference in the National Basketball Association (NBA). The team is owned by Jerry Reinsdorf and Tiago Splitter is the current head coach. They play their home games in the United Center. The Bulls first joined the NBA in the 1966–67 season as an expansion team. Coached by Johnny Kerr, the team finished its first season with a 33–48 record, the best record achieved by an expansion team in its first year of play, and secured a playoff berth. The Bulls won their first NBA championship in the 1991 NBA Finals while coached by Phil Jackson. They won five additional NBA championships in the 1990s under Jackson.

There have been 21 head coaches for the Bulls franchise. Phil Jackson is also the franchise's all-time leader in regular season games coached, regular season games won, playoff games coached, and playoff games won. Jackson and Jerry Sloan are the only Bulls coaches to have been inducted into the Basketball Hall of Fame as a coach. Kerr, Dick Motta, Jackson, and Thibodeau have won NBA Coach of the Year with the team. Ed Badger, Bill Berry, Bill Cartwright, Pete Myers and Jim Boylan have all spent their entire NBA head coaching careers with the Bulls. Sloan, Cartwright, and Myers formerly played for the Bulls.

== Key ==
GC	Games coached
W	Wins
L	Losses
Win%	Winning percentage
#	Number of coaches^{[a]}
*	Spent entire NBA head coaching career with the Bulls
†	Elected into the Basketball Hall of Fame as a coach

== Coaches ==
Note: Statistics are correct through April 13, 2026.

#	Name	Term^{[b]}	GC	W	L	Win%	GC	W	L	Win%	Achievements	Reference
#	Name	Term^{[b]}	Regular season				Playoffs				Achievements	Reference
1	Johnny Kerr	1966–1968	163	62	101	.380	8	1	7	.125	1966–67 NBA Coach of the Year	
2	Dick Motta	1968–1976	656	356	300	.543	47	18	29	.383	1970–71 NBA Coach of the Year	
3	Ed Badger*	1976–1978	164	84	80	.512	3	1	2	.333		
4	Larry Costello	1978–1979	56	20	36	.357	—	—	—	—		
5	Scotty Robertson	1979	26	11	15	.423	—	—	—	—		
6	Jerry Sloan†	1979–1982	215	94	121	.437	6	2	4	.333		
7	Phil Johnson	1982	1	0	1	.000	—	—	—	—		
8	Rod Thorn	1982	30	15	15	.500	—	—	—	—		
9	Paul Westhead	1982–1983	82	28	54	.341	—	—	—	—		
10	Kevin Loughery	1983–1985	164	65	99	.396	4	1	3	.250		
11	Stan Albeck	1985–1986	82	30	52	.366	3	0	3	.000		
12	Doug Collins	1986–1989	246	137	109	.557	30	13	17	.433		
13	Phil Jackson	1989–1998	738	545	193	.738	152	111	41	.730	1995–96 NBA Coach of the Year; 6 championships (1991, 1992, 1993, 1996, 1997, 1998); One of the top 10 coaches in NBA history	
14	Tim Floyd	1998–2001	239	49	190	.205	—	—	—	—		
15	Bill Berry*	2001	2	0	2	.000	—	—	—	—		
16	Bill Cartwright*	2001–2003	151	51	100	.336	—	—	—	—		
17	Pete Myers*	2003	2	0	2	.000	—	—	—	—		
18	Scott Skiles	2003–2007	337	165	172	.490	22	10	12	.455		
—	Pete Myers*	2007	1	0	1	.000	—	—	—	—		
19	Jim Boylan	2007–2008	56	24	32	.429	—	—	—	—		
20	Vinny Del Negro	2008–2010	164	82	82	.500	12	4	8	.333		
21	Tom Thibodeau	2010–2015	394	255	139	.647	51	23	28	.451	2010–11 NBA Coach of the Year	
22	Fred Hoiberg*	2015–2018	270	115	155	.426	6	2	4	.333		
23	Jim Boylen*	2018–2020	123	39	84	.317	—	—	—	–		
24	Billy Donovan	2020–2026	482	226	256	.469	5	1	4	.200		
25	Tiago Splitter	2026–present	—	—	—	–	—	—	—	–		

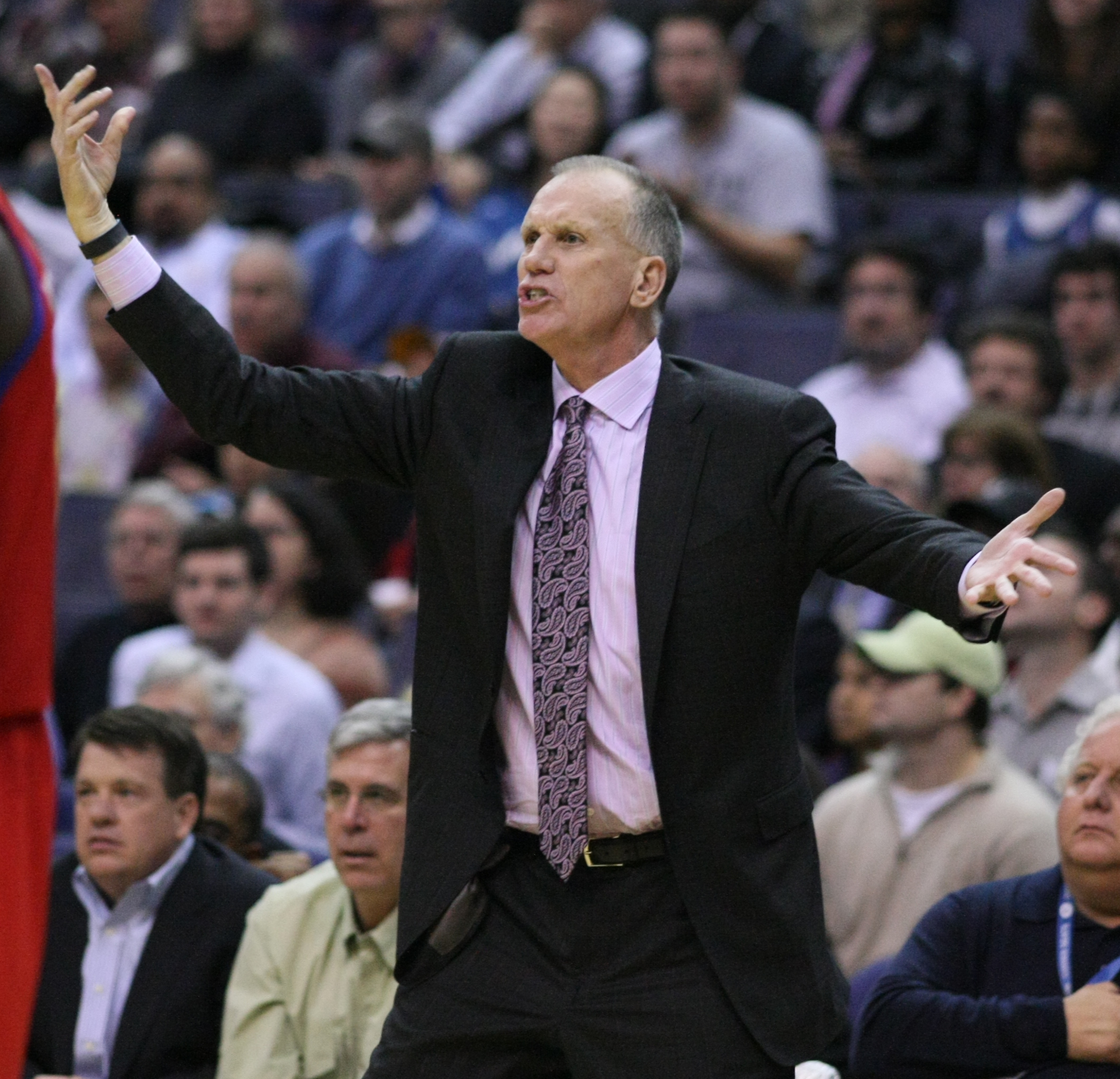
Doug Collins coached the Bulls from 1986 to 1989.

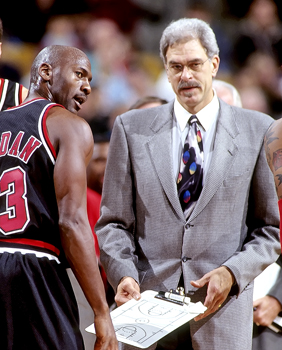
Phil Jackson won six championships with the Bulls from 1989–1998.

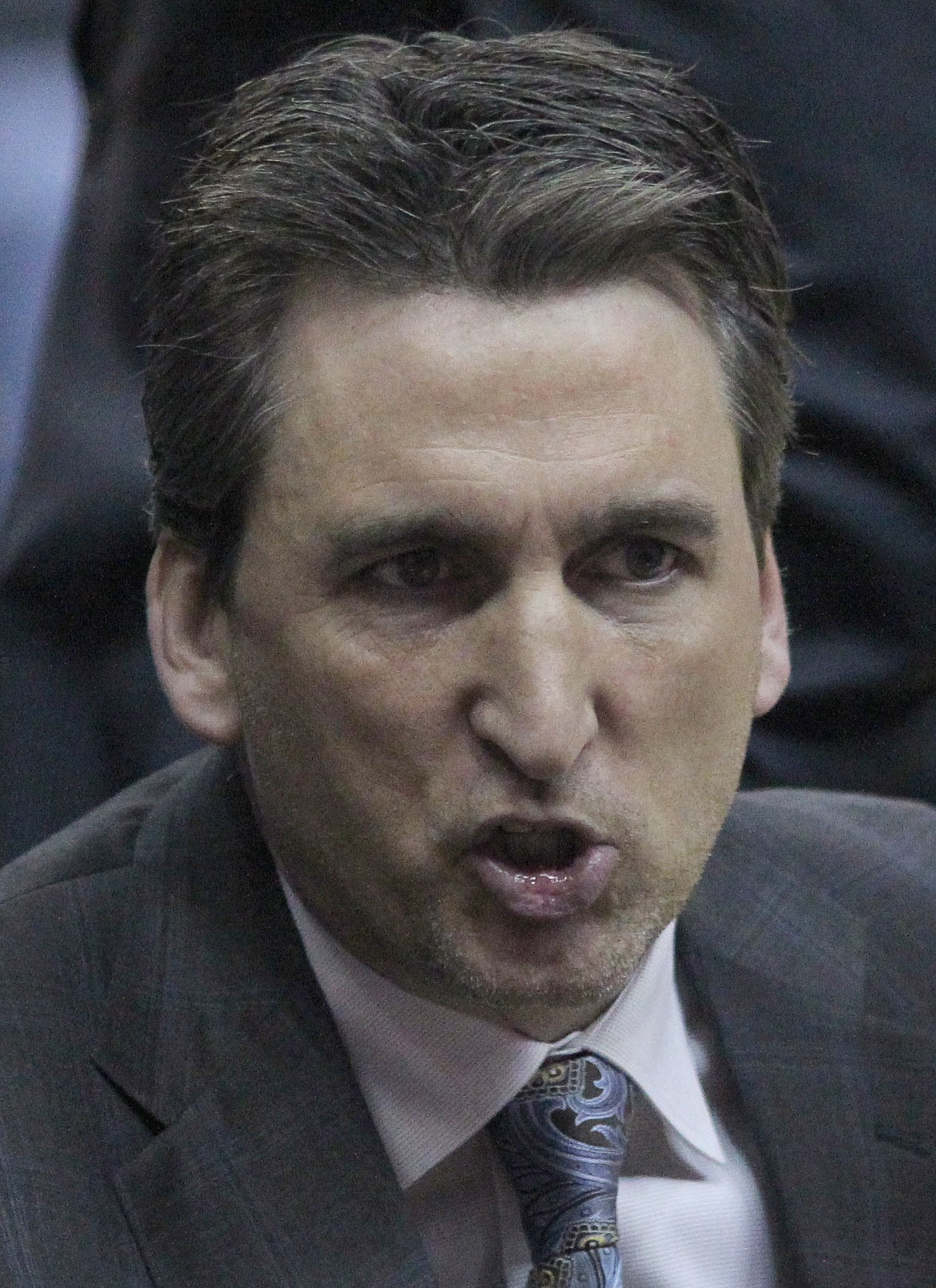
Vinny Del Negro coached the Bulls to back to back playoff appearances during his two-year tenure with the team.

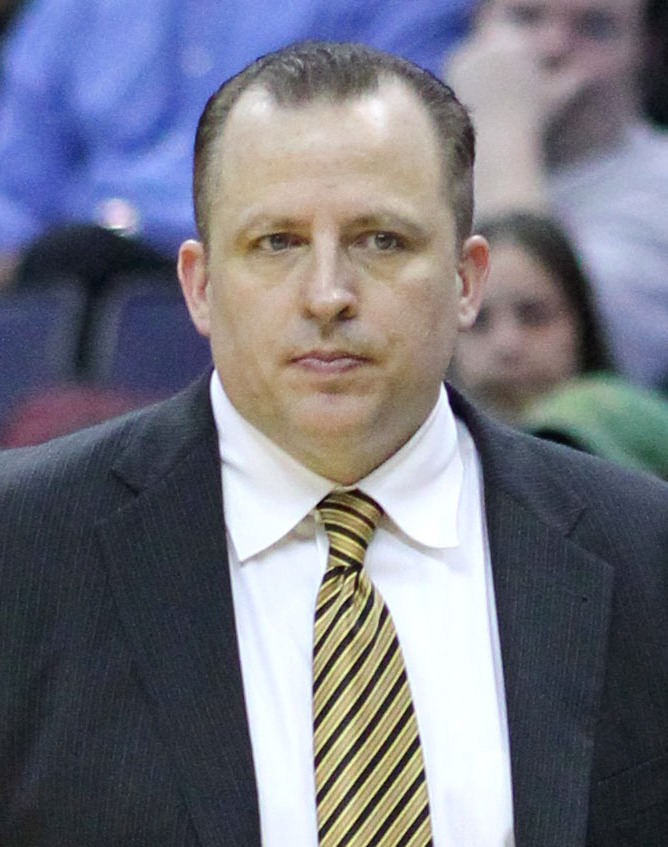
Tom Thibodeau coached the Bulls from 2010 to 2015

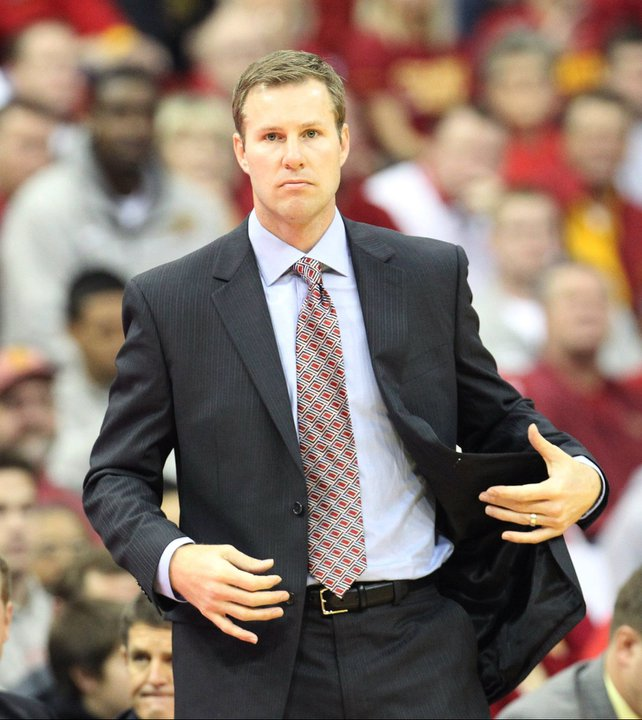
Fred Hoiberg coached the Bulls from 2015 to 2018

== Notes ==
- ^{a} A running total of the number of coaches of the Bulls. Thus any coach who has two or more separate terms as head coach is only counted once.
- ^{b} Each year is linked to an article about that particular NBA season.
