= List of Brooklyn Nets head coaches =

The Brooklyn Nets are an American professional basketball team based in the New York City borough of Brooklyn. They are a member of the Atlantic Division of the Eastern Conference in the National Basketball Association (NBA). The team plays its home games at the Barclays Center. The franchise was founded as the New Jersey Americans in 1967, and was one of the eleven original American Basketball Association (ABA) teams. In its second ABA season, Arthur Brown, the team owner, moved the team to Long Island and renamed it the New York Nets. The team won ABA championships in 1974 and 1976. When the ABA merged with the NBA in 1976, the Nets were one of four ABA teams admitted into the NBA. The team was moved to the Rutgers Athletic Center in New Jersey; after the 1976–77 NBA season, the team was renamed the New Jersey Nets. Since they joined the NBA, the Nets have won 4 divisional championships, 2 conference championships and appeared in the playoffs 16 times. The Nets moved to Brooklyn in 2012, and now play as the Brooklyn Nets.

There have been 25 head coaches for the Nets franchise. The franchise's first head coach was Max Zaslofsky, who led the team for two seasons. Kevin Loughery is the only Nets coach to have led the team to a championship; the Nets won ABA championships in 1974 and 1976 during his tenure. Loughery is the franchise's all-time leader in regular season games coached (615) and wins (297); P. J. Carlesimo is the franchise's all-time leader in regular season winning percentage (.648). Byron Scott is the franchise's all-time leader in playoff games coached (40) and wins (25), as well as playoff-game winning percentage (.625). Chuck Daly and Bill Fitch were selected as two of the top 10 coaches in NBA history. Daly, Brown and Lou Carnesecca are the only Nets coaches to have been inducted into the Basketball Hall of Fame as coaches. Zaslofsky, York Larese, Lou Carnesecca, Dave Wohl, Butch Beard, John Calipari, Tom Barrise, and Kiki Vandeweghe spent their entire coaching careers with the Nets/Americans.

== Key ==
GC	Games coached
W	Wins
L	Losses
Win%	Winning percentage
#	Number of coaches (Note: A running total of the number of coaches of the Americans/Nets. Thus, any coach who has two or more separate terms as head coach is only counted once.)
*	Spent entire ABA/NBA head coaching career with the Americans/Nets
†	Elected into the Basketball Hall of Fame as a coach
*†	Elected into the Basketball Hall of Fame as a coach and spent entire ABA/NBA head coaching career with the Americans/Nets

== Coaches ==
Note: Statistics are correct through the end of the 2025–26 season.

#	Name	Term (Note: Each year is linked to an article about that particular NBA season, except for the seasons spent in the ABA.)	GC	W	L	Win%	GC	W	L	Win%	Achievements	Reference
#	Name	Term	Regular season				Playoffs				Achievements	Reference
New Jersey Americans
1	Max Zaslofsky*	1967–1968	78	36	42	.462	—	—	—	—		
New York Nets
—	Max Zaslofsky*	1968–1969	78	17	61	.218	—	—	—	—		
2	York Larese*	1969–1970	84	39	45	.464	7	3	4	.429		
3	Lou Carnesecca*†	1970–1973	252	114	138	.452	30	13	17	.433		
4	Kevin Loughery	1973–1977	334	190	144	.569	32	21	11	.656	2 ABA championships (1974, 1976)	
New Jersey Nets
—	Kevin Loughery	1977–1980	281	107	174	.381	2	0	2	.000		
—	Bob MacKinnon	1980–1981	47	12	35	.255	—	—	—	—		
5	Larry Brown†	1981–1983	158	91	67	.576	2	0	2	.000		
6	Bill Blair	1983	6	2	4	.333	2	0	2	.000		
7	Stan Albeck	1983–1985	164	87	77	.530	14	5	9	.357		
8	Dave Wohl*	1985–1987	179	65	114	.363	3	0	3	.000		
9	Bob MacKinnon	1987–1988	39	10	29	.256	—	—	—	—		
10	Willis Reed	1988–1989	110	33	77	.300	—	—	—	—		
11	Bill Fitch†	1989–1992	246	83	163	.337	4	1	3	.250	One of the top 10 coaches in NBA history	
12	Chuck Daly†	1992–1994	164	88	76	.537	9	3	6	.333	One of the top 10 coaches in NBA history	
13	Butch Beard*	1994–1996	164	60	104	.366	—	—	—	—		
14	John Calipari*†	1996–1999	184	72	112	.391	3	0	3	.000		
15	Don Casey	1999–2000	112	44	68	.393	—	—	—	—		
16	Byron Scott	2000–2004	288	149	139	.517	40	25	15	.625	2 straight NBA Finals appearances	
17	Lawrence Frank	2004–2009	466	225	241	.483	38	18	20	.474		
—	Tom Barrise*	2009	2	0	2	.000	—	—	—	—		
18	Kiki Vandeweghe*	2009–2010	64	12	52	.188	—	—	—	—		
19	Avery Johnson	2010–2012	148	46	102	.311	—	—	—	—		
Brooklyn Nets
—	Avery Johnson	2012	28	14	14	.500	—	—	—	—		
—	P. J. Carlesimo	2012–2013	54	35	19	.648	7	3	4	.429		
20	Jason Kidd	2013–2014	82	44	38	.537	12	5	7	.417		
21	Lionel Hollins	2014–2016	119	48	71	.403	6	2	4	.333		
—	Tony Brown*	2016	45	11	34	.244	—	—	—	—		
22	Kenny Atkinson*	2016–2020	308	118	190	.383	5	1	4	.200		
—	Jacque Vaughn	2020	10	7	3	.700	4	0	4	.000		
23	Steve Nash*	2020–2022	161	94	67	.584	16	7	9	.438		
24	Jacque Vaughn	2022–2024	129	64	65	.496	4	0	4	.000		
—	Kevin Ollie*	2024	28	11	17	.393	—	—	—	—		
25	Jordi Fernández*	2024–present	164	46	118	.280	—	—	—	–		

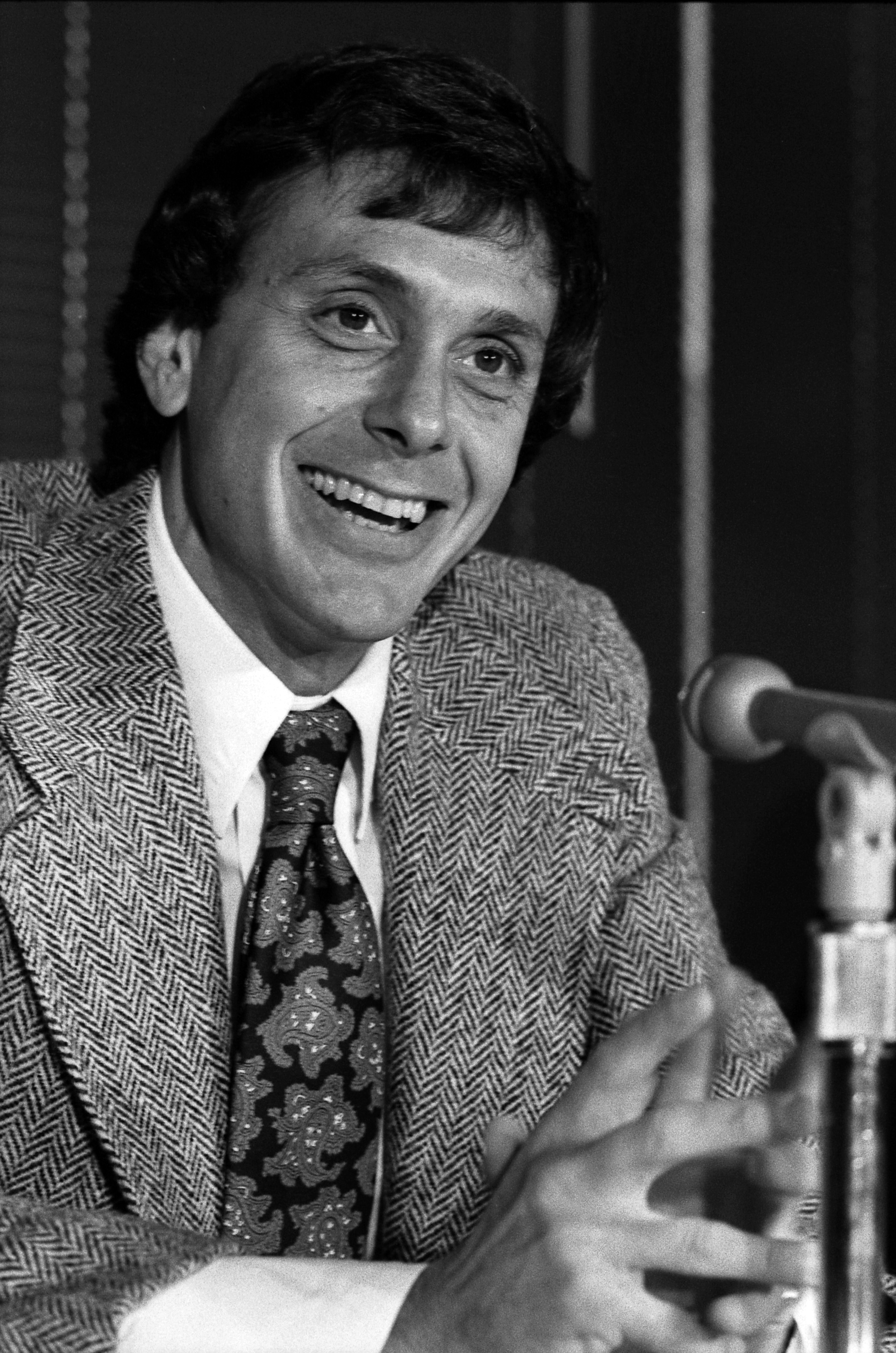
Larry Brown was the head coach for the Nets from 1981 to 1983.

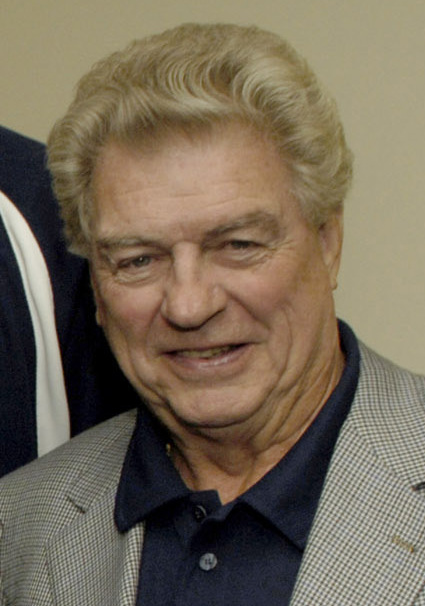
Chuck Daly coached the Nets for two seasons from 1992 to 1994.

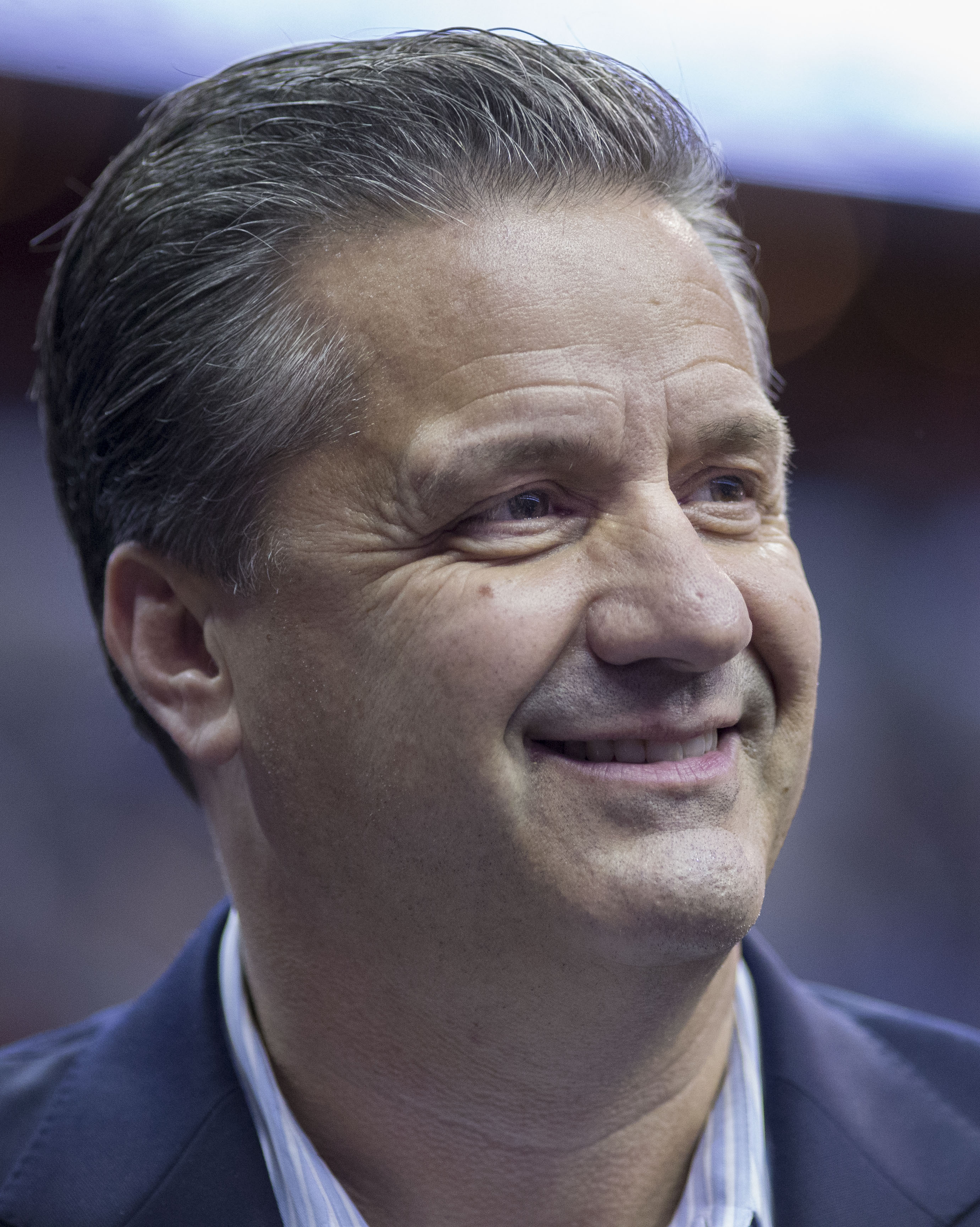
John Calipari was the head coach for Nets from 1996 to 1999.

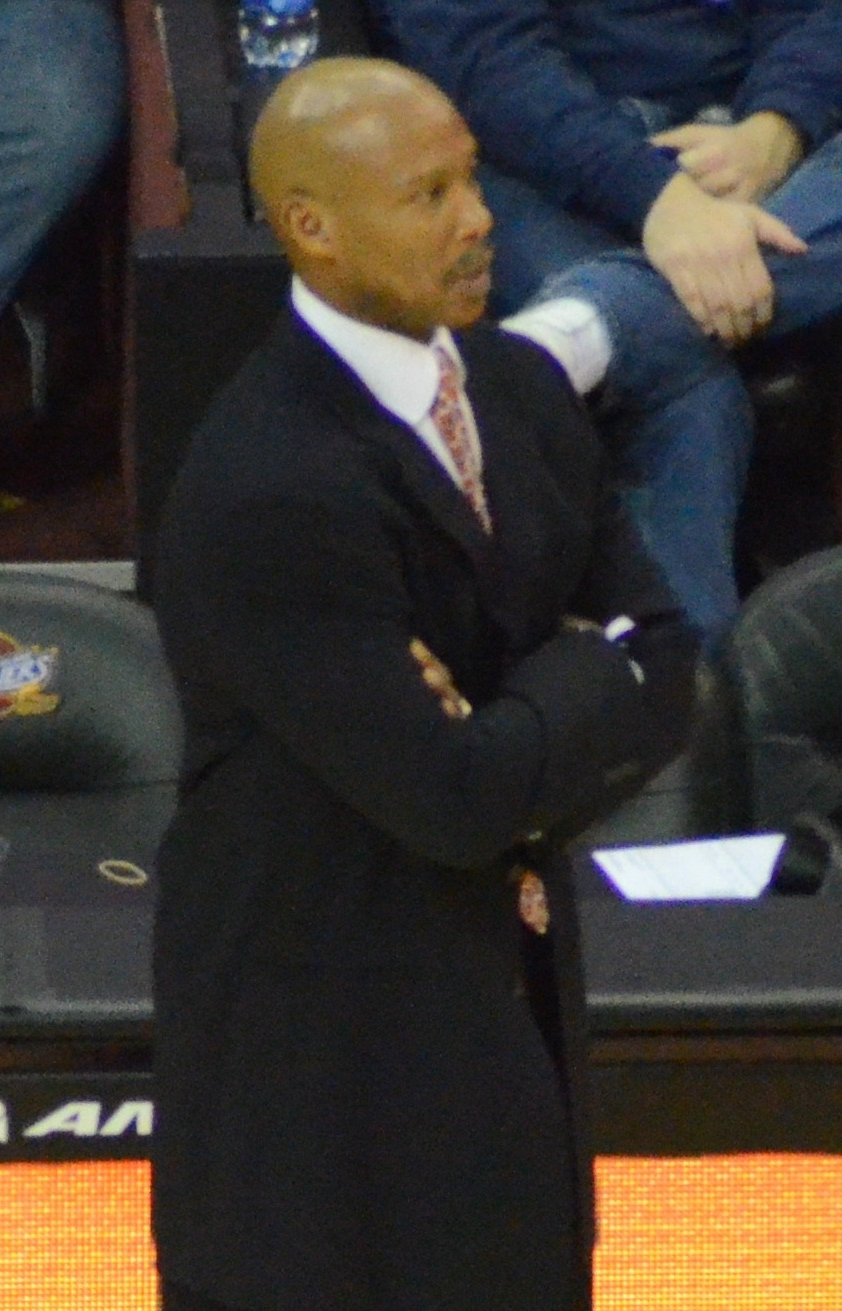
Byron Scott was the head coach from 2000 to 2004 and led the Nets to two NBA Finals in 2002 and 2003.

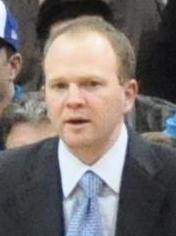
Lawrence Frank was the coach for the Nets from 2004 to 2009.

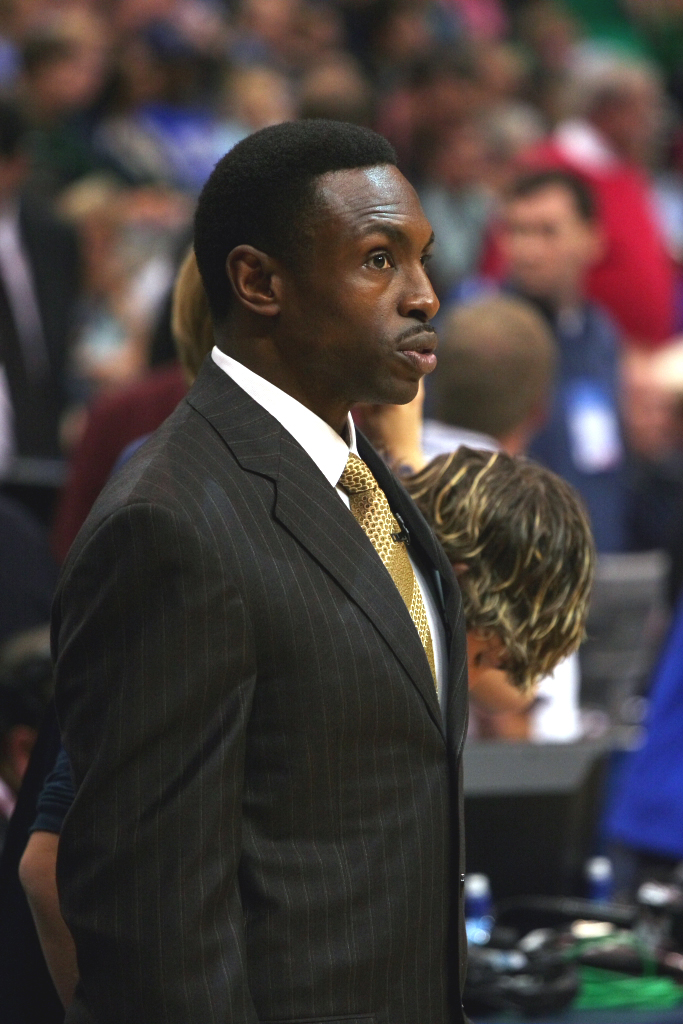
Avery Johnson was the head coach for the Nets from 2010 to 2012.
