= List of Indiana Pacers head coaches =

The Indiana Pacers are an American professional basketball team based in Indianapolis, Indiana. The Pacers play in the Central Division of the Eastern Conference in the National Basketball Association (NBA). The team began playing in 1967 as a charter member of the American Basketball Association (ABA), and joined the NBA as part of the ABA–NBA merger. The team has played their home games at the Gainbridge Fieldhouse since the 1999–2000 NBA season. The Pacers are owned by Herb Simon, and Chad Buchanan is their general manager. Nate Bjorkgren was the team's head coach in 2020–21 and was fired after one season. Rick Carlisle was hired to replaced Bjorkgren, becoming the coach of the Pacers for the second time.

There have been 14 head coaches for the Pacers franchise. The franchise's first head coach was Larry Staverman, who coached for two seasons. Bobby Leonard is the franchise's all-time leader for the most regular-season games coached (985), the most regular-season game wins (529), the most playoff games coached (116), and the most playoff game wins (69). Leonard is also the only coach to win an ABA championship with the Pacers, with 3 (1970, 1972, 1973). Larry Bird, who coached three seasons with the Pacers, is the Pacers' all-time leader for the highest winning percentage with .687. Bird is also the only coach to win an NBA Eastern Conference championship with the Pacers, but lost the 2000 NBA Finals against the Los Angeles Lakers. Mel Daniels is the only Pacers coach to have coached less than one season. Jack Ramsay, Larry Brown, and Bobby Leonard are the only Pacers' coaches to be elected into the Basketball Hall of Fame as a coach. Ramsay was also named one of the top 10 coaches in NBA history. Jack McKinney and Larry Bird have won the NBA Coach of the Year Award, in 1980–81 and 1997–98, respectively, with the Pacers. Dick Versace and Bird have spent their entire NBA coaching careers with the Pacers. Frank Vogel was named interim head coach after Jim O'Brien was fired midway through the 2010–11 season.

== Key ==
GC	Games coached
W	Wins
L	Losses
Win%	Winning percentage
#	Number of coaches^{[a]}
*	Spent entire NBA head coaching career with the Pacers
†	Elected into the Basketball Hall of Fame as a coach

== Coaches ==
Note: Statistics are correct through the end of the 2025–26 season.

#	Name	Term^{[b]}	GC	W	L	Win%	GC	W	L	Win%	Achievements	Reference
#	Name	Term^{[b]}	Regular season				Playoffs				Achievements	Reference
1	Larry Staverman	1967–1968	87	40	47	.460	3	0	3	.000		
2	Bobby Leonard†	1968–1980	985	529	456	.537	116	69	47	.595	3 ABA championships (1970, 1972, 1973)	
3	Jack McKinney	1980–1984	328	125	203	.381	2	0	2	.000	1980–81 NBA Coach of the Year	
4	George Irvine	1984–1986	164	48	116	.293	—	—	—	—		
5	Jack Ramsay†	1986–1988	171	79	92	.462	4	1	3	.250	One of the top 10 coaches in NBA history	
6	Mel Daniels	1988	2	0	2	.000	—	—	—	—		
—	George Irvine	1988–1989	20	6	14	.300	—	—	—	—		
7	Dick Versace*	1989–1990	160	73	87	.456	3	0	3	.000		
8	Bob Hill	1990–1993	221	113	108	.511	12	3	9	.250		
9	Larry Brown†	1993–1997	328	190	138	.579	38	22	16	.579		
10	Larry Bird*	1997–2000	214	147	67	.687	52	32	20	.615	1997–98 NBA Coach of the Year	
11	Isiah Thomas	2000–2003	246	131	115	.533	15	5	10	.333		
12	Rick Carlisle	2003–2007	328	181	147	.552	35	18	17	.514		
13	Jim O'Brien	2007–2010	290	121	169	.417	—	—	—	—		
14	Frank Vogel	2010–2016	431	250	181	.580	59	30	29	.508		
15	Nate McMillan	2016–2020	319	183	136	.574	19	3	16	.158		
16	Nate Bjorkgren*	2020–2021	72	34	38	.472	—	—	—	—		
—	Rick Carlisle	2021–present	410	176	234	.402	50	23	17	.575		

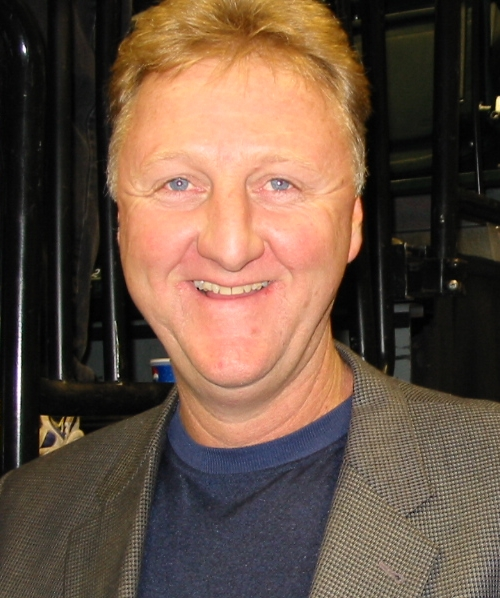
Larry Bird coached the Pacers to the NBA Finals during the 1999–2000 season.

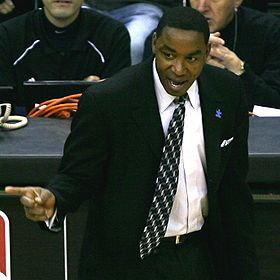
Isiah Thomas coached the Pacers from 2000–01 to 2002–03.

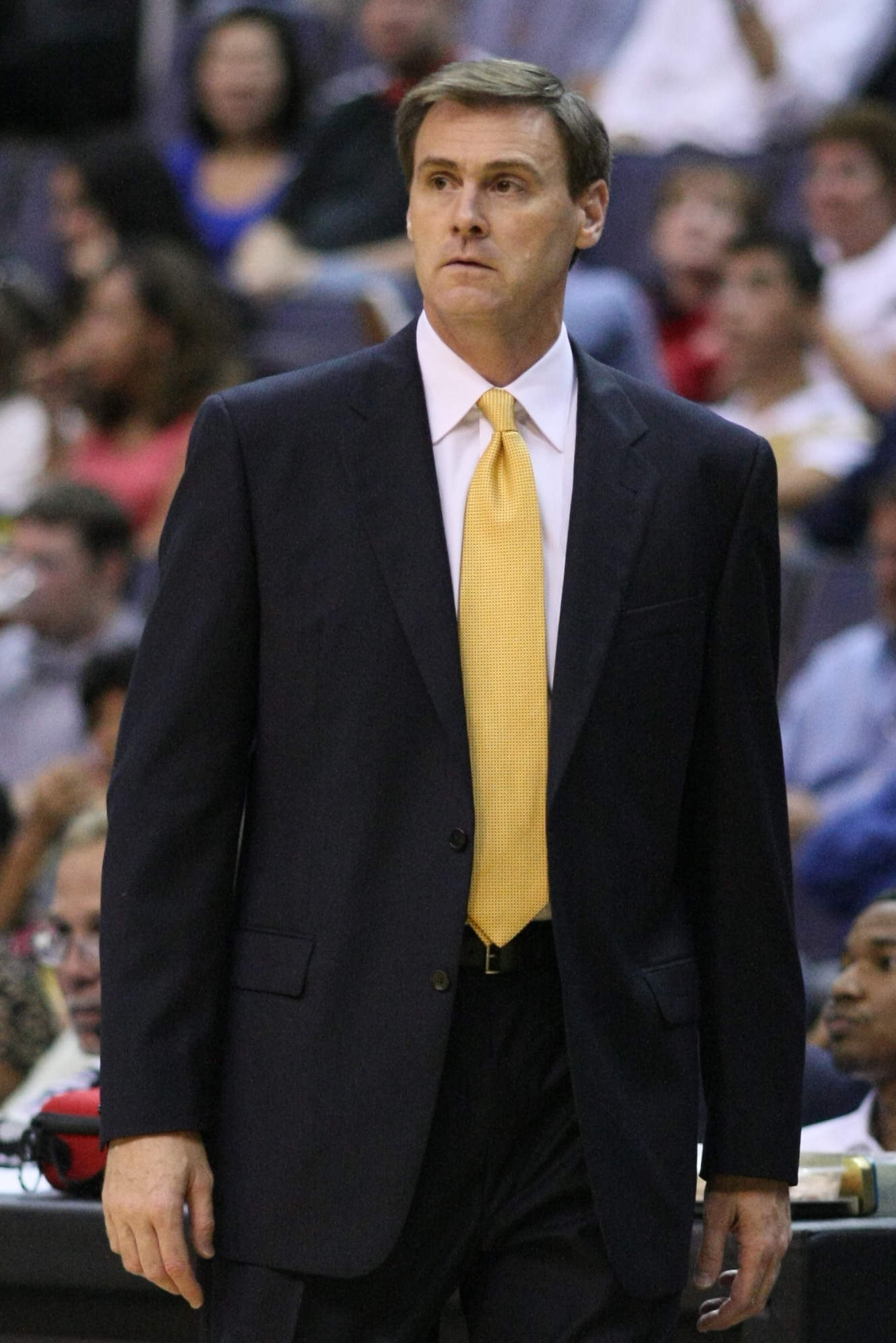
Rick Carlisle coached the Pacers from 2003–04 to 2006–07 and then returned to the team for a second stint starting with the 2021–22 season.

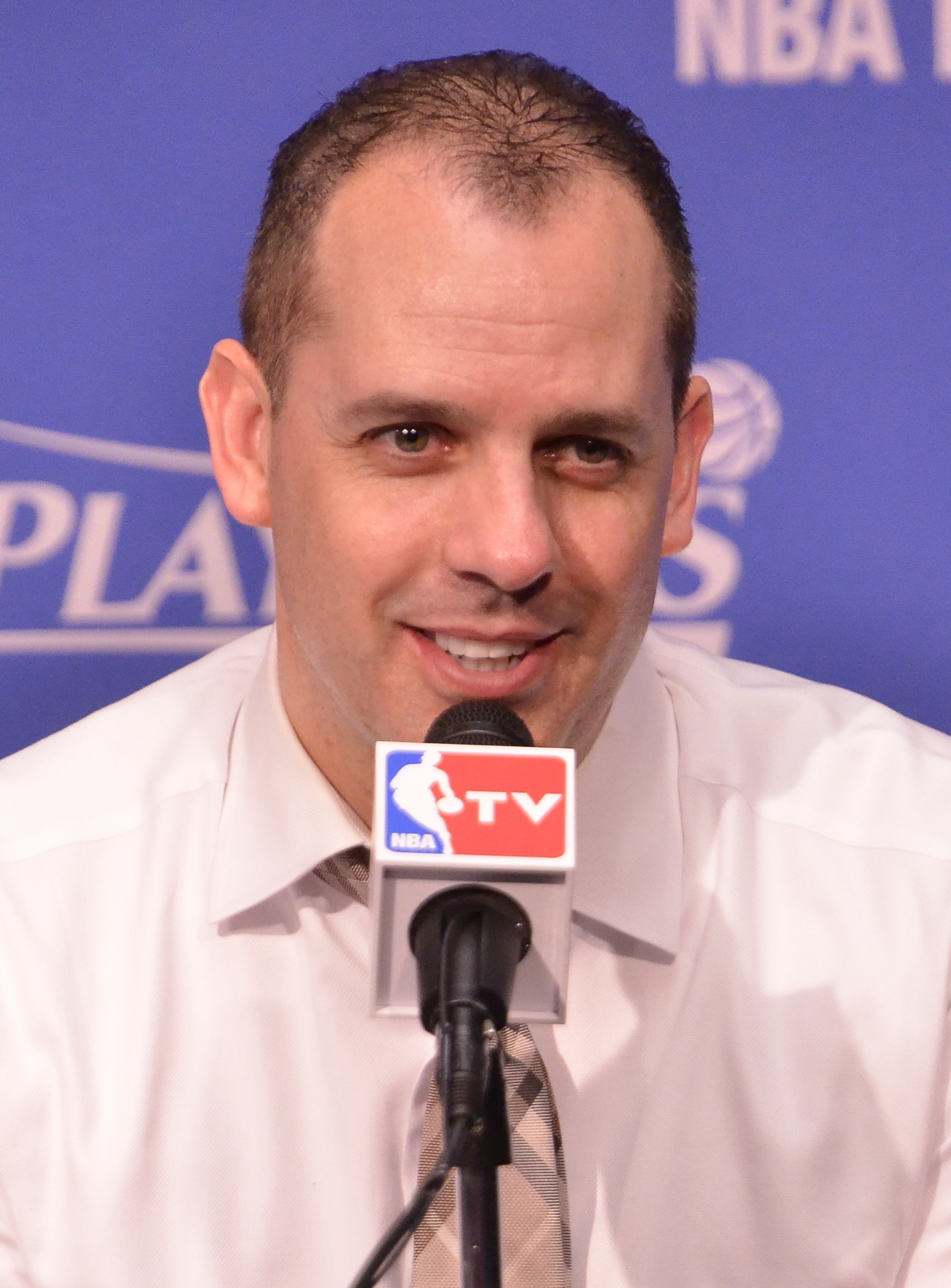
Frank Vogel, Pacers coach from 2010 to 2016

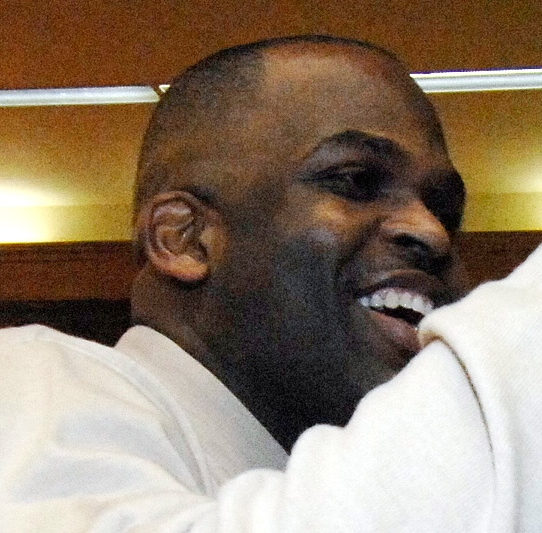
Nate McMillan, Pacers coach from 2016–17 to 2020

== Notes ==
- ^{a} A running total of the number of coaches of the Pacers. Thus, any coach who has two or more separate terms as head coach is only counted once.
- ^{b} Each year is linked to an article about that particular NBA season, except for the seasons spent in the ABA.
