= List of Phoenix Suns head coaches =

The Phoenix Suns are an American professional basketball team based in Phoenix, Arizona. They are members of the Pacific Division of the Western Conference in the National Basketball Association (NBA). Founded in 1968, the Suns are chronologically the second-oldest team in the Western Conference. The Suns are also chronologically the third-oldest team in the NBA to have never won an NBA Championship while having played in the NBA Finals at least once. The Suns play their home games at the Mortgage Matchup Center.

The Phoenix Suns franchise has had 23 head coaches. John MacLeod is the franchise's all-time leader in coaching years and games won, winning the most regular-season and playoff games. Cotton Fitzsimmons, Mike D'Antoni and Monty Williams are the only coaches to have won the NBA Coach of the Year Award with the Suns. The Suns never have been coached by a Basketball Hall of Fame inductee. Paul Westphal has the highest all-time winning percentage with the Suns with a .685 percentage. Alvin Gentry was named head coach after Terry Porter was dismissed by the Suns after 51 games in 2008. Gentry left the Phoenix Suns under mutual agreement to part ways on January 18, 2013. He was replaced by Lindsey Hunter halfway through the 2012–13 NBA season. He has since been replaced by former Suns player Jeff Hornacek. Hired in 2018, Serbian coach Igor Kokoškov became the first head coach born and raised outside of North America to be hired as a head coach in NBA history. Former Pelicans coach Monty Williams was hired as head coach on May 3, 2019, and served until May 13, 2023. On June 6, 2023, the Suns hired Frank Vogel as head coach.

== Key ==
GC	Games coached
W	Wins
L	Losses
Win%	Winning percentage
#	Number of coaches^{[a]}
*	Spent entire NBA head coaching career with the Suns

== Coaches ==
Note: Statistics are correct through the end of the 2025–26 season.

#	Name	Term^{[b]}	GC	W	L	Win%	GC	W	L	Win%	Achievements	Reference
#	Name	Term^{[b]}	Regular season				Playoffs				Achievements	Reference
1	Johnny Kerr	1968–1969	120	31	89	.258	—	—	—	—		
2	Jerry Colangelo*	1970	44	24	20	.545	7	3	4	.429		
3	Cotton Fitzsimmons	1970–1972	164	97	67	.591	—	—	—	—		
4	Butch van Breda Kolff	1972	7	3	4	.429	—	—	—	—		
—	Jerry Colangelo*	1972–1973	75	35	40	.467	—	—	—	—		
5	John MacLeod	1973–1987	1122	579	543	.516	81	37	44	.457		
6	Dick Van Arsdale*	1987	26	14	12	.538	—	—	—	—		
7	John Wetzel*	1987–1988	82	28	54	.341	—	—	—	—		
—	Cotton Fitzsimmons	1988–1992	328	217	111	.662	40	21	19	.525	NBA Coach of the Year (1988–89)	
8	Paul Westphal	1992–1996	279	191	88	.685	44	25	19	.568		
—	Cotton Fitzsimmons	1996	57	27	30	.474	4	1	3	.250		
9	Danny Ainge*	1996–1999	226	136	90	.602	12	3	9	.250		
10	Scott Skiles	1999–2002	195	116	79	.595	13	5	8	.385		
11	Frank Johnson*	2002–2003	134	63	71	.470	6	2	4	.333		
12	Mike D'Antoni	2003–2008	389	253	136	.650	51	26	25	.510	NBA Coach of the Year (2004–05)	
13	Terry Porter	2008–2009	51	28	23	.549	—	—	—	—		
14	Alvin Gentry	2009–2013	261	158	144	.523	16	10	6	.625		
15	Lindsey Hunter*	2013	41	12	29	.293	—	—	—	—		
16	Jeff Hornacek	2013–2016	213	101	112	.474	—	—	—	—		
17	Earl Watson*	2016–2017	118	33	85	.280	—	—	—	—		
18	Jay Triano	2017–2018	79	21	58	.266	—	—	—	—		
19	Igor Kokoškov*	2018–2019	82	19	63	.232	—	—	—	—		
20	Monty Williams	2019–2023	309	194	115	.628	46	27	19	.587	NBA Coach of the Year (2021–22)	
21	Frank Vogel	2023–2024	82	49	33	.598	4	0	4	.000		
22	Mike Budenholzer	2024–2025	82	36	46	.439	—	—	—	—		
23	Jordan Ott*	2025–present	82	45	37	.549	4	0	4	.000		

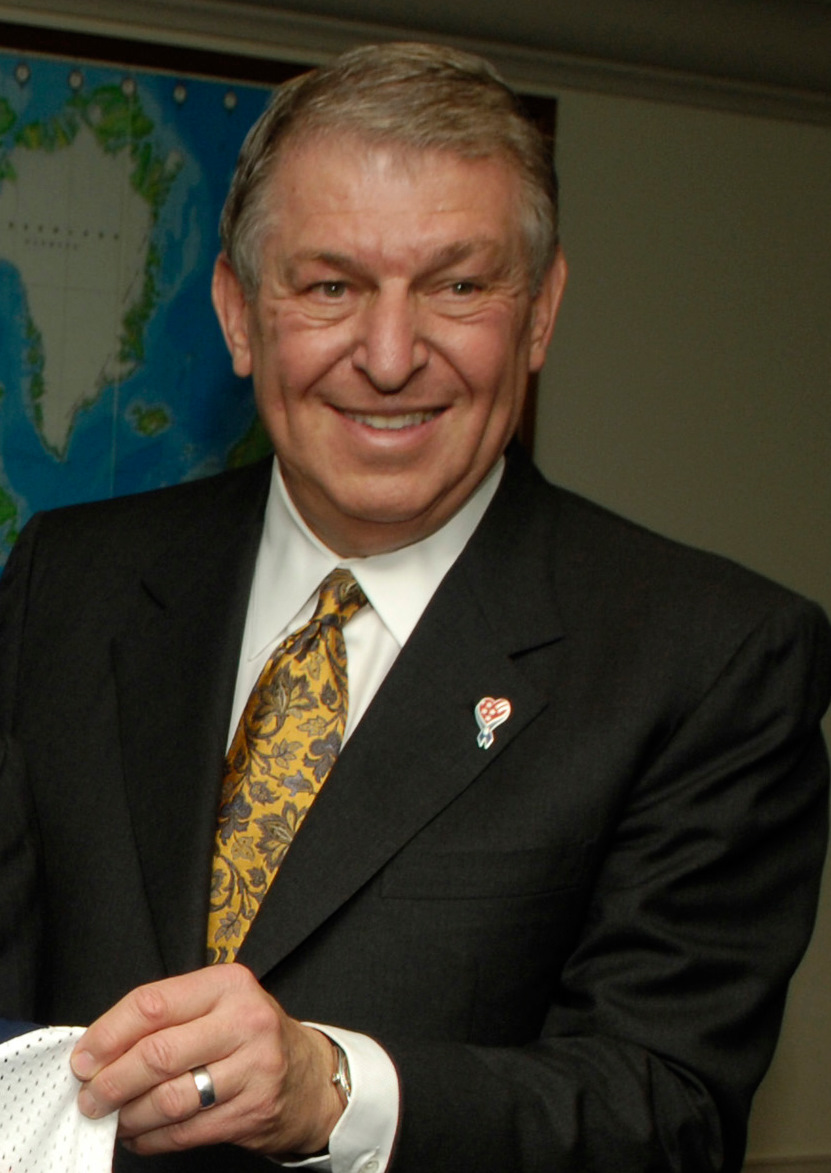
Jerry Colangelo coached the Suns in 1970 and in the 1972–1973 season.

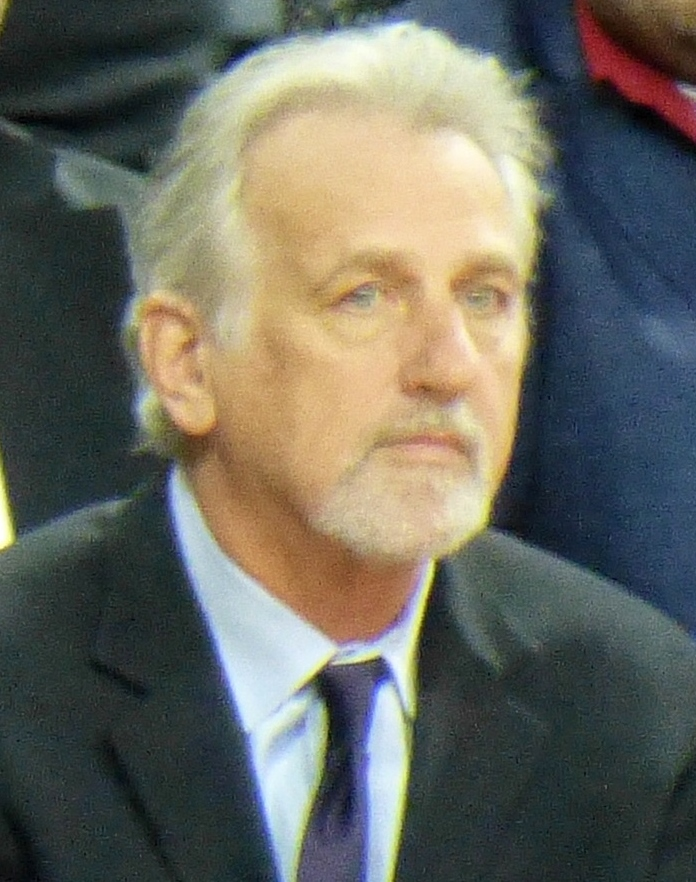
Paul Westphal coached the Suns from 1992 to 1996, leading the team to their second NBA Finals appearance in 1993.

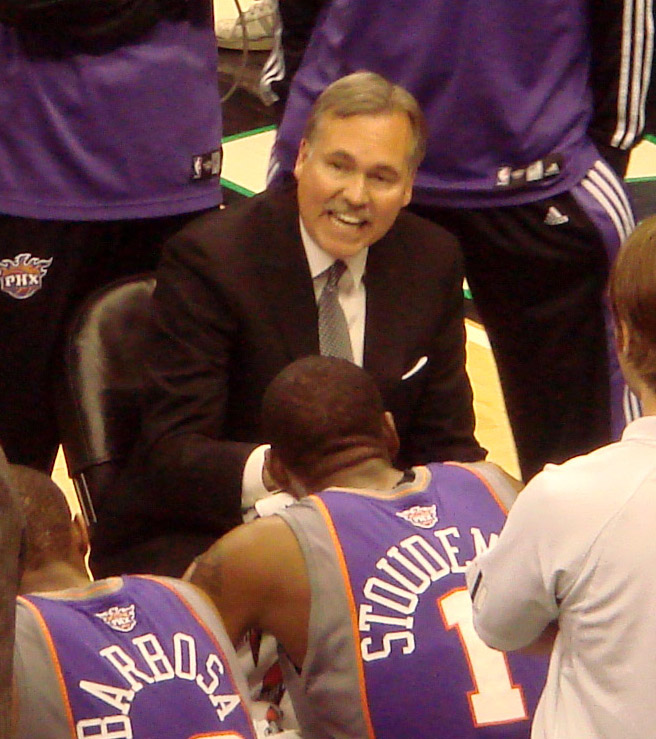
Mike D'Antoni coached the Suns from 2003 to 2008, with Western Conference Finals appearances in 2005 and 2006.

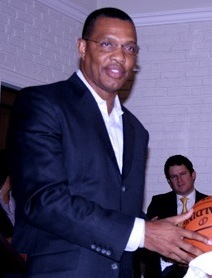
Alvin Gentry coached the Suns from 2009 to 2013, with a Western Conference Finals appearance in 2010.

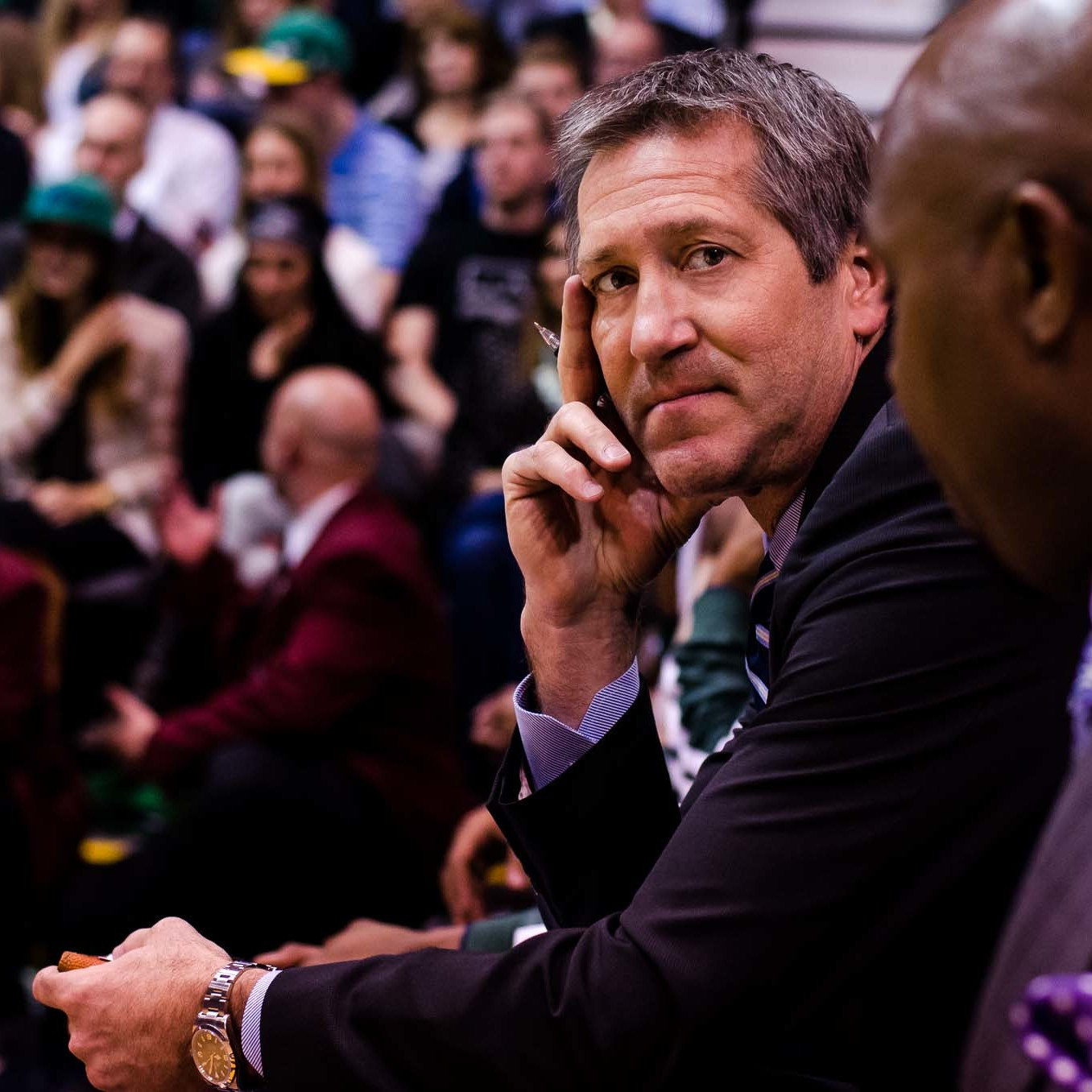
Jeff Hornacek coached the Suns from 2013–2016.

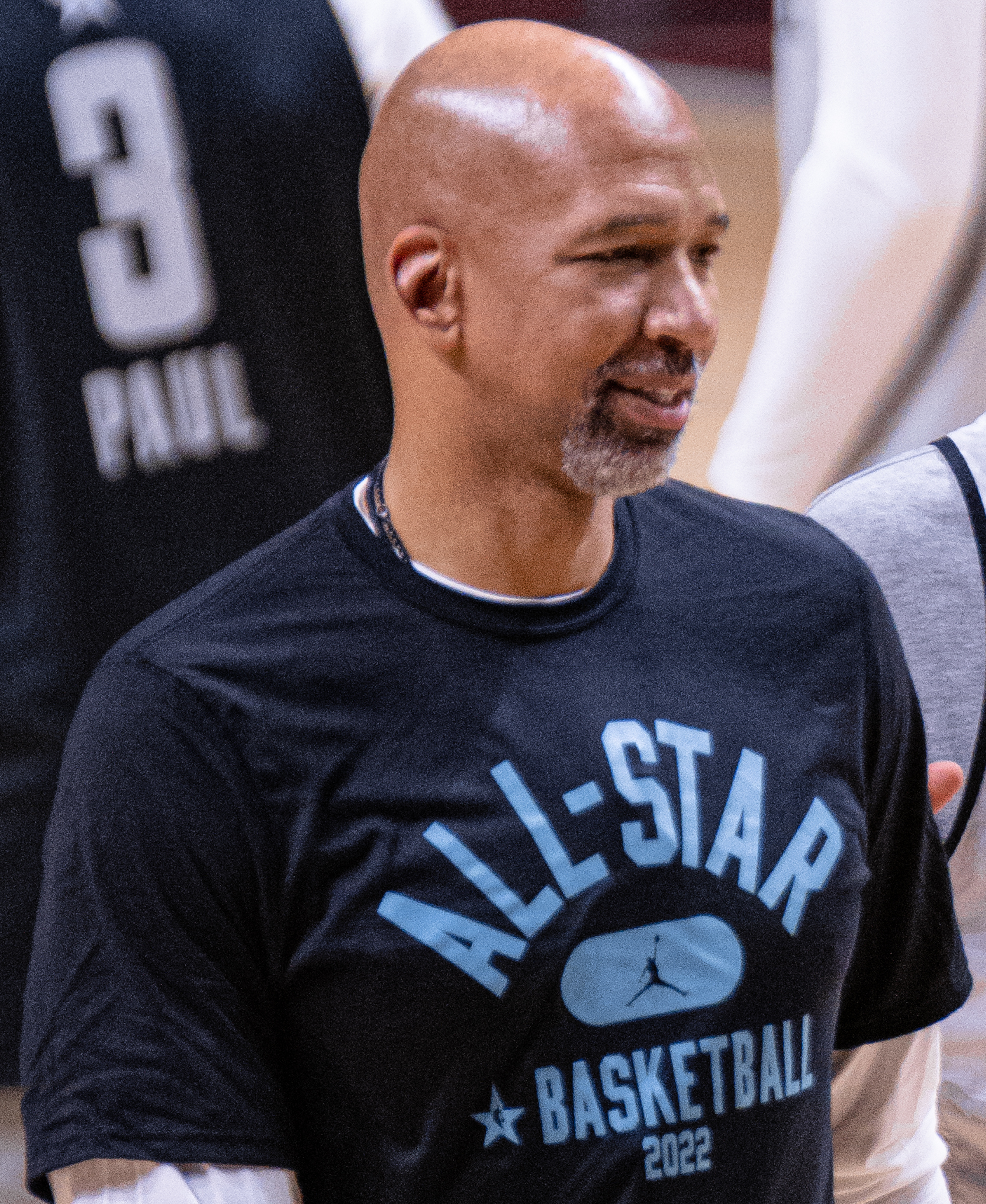
Monty Williams coached the Phoenix Suns from 2018 to 2023, leading the team to their third NBA Finals appearance in 2021.

== Notes ==
- ^{a} A running total of the number of coaches of the Suns. Thus, any coach who has two or more separate terms as head coach is only counted once.
- ^{b} Each year is linked to an article about that particular NBA season.
