= List of NBA All-Star Game records =

This article lists all-time leading figures achieved in the NBA All-Star Game in every major statistical category recognized by the league. This includes statistical records set by individuals in single All-Star games and over the course of their careers.

== Individual ==
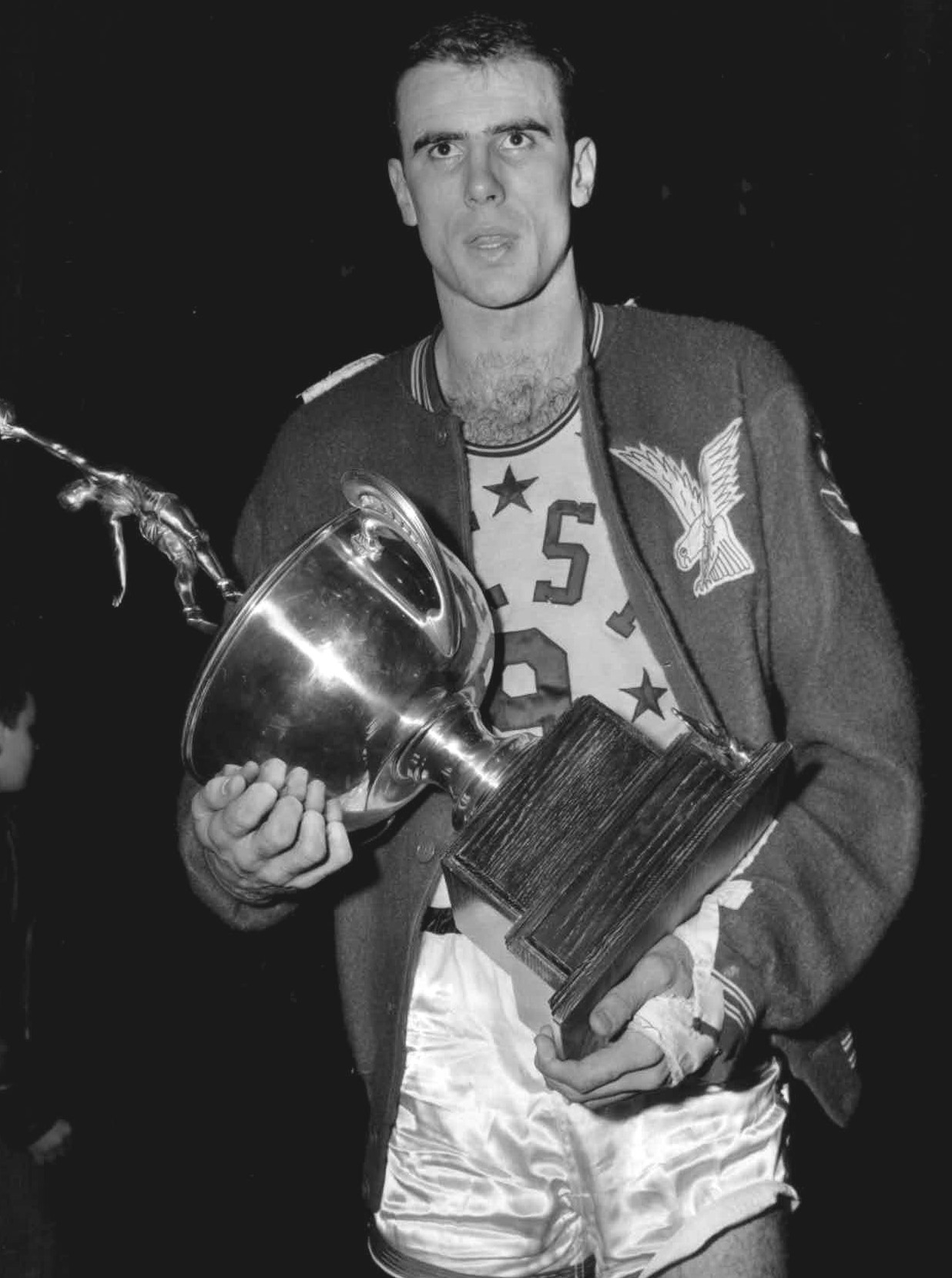
Bob Pettit was named MVP of the NBA All-Star Game four times and holds the All-Star single-game record for rebounds with 27.

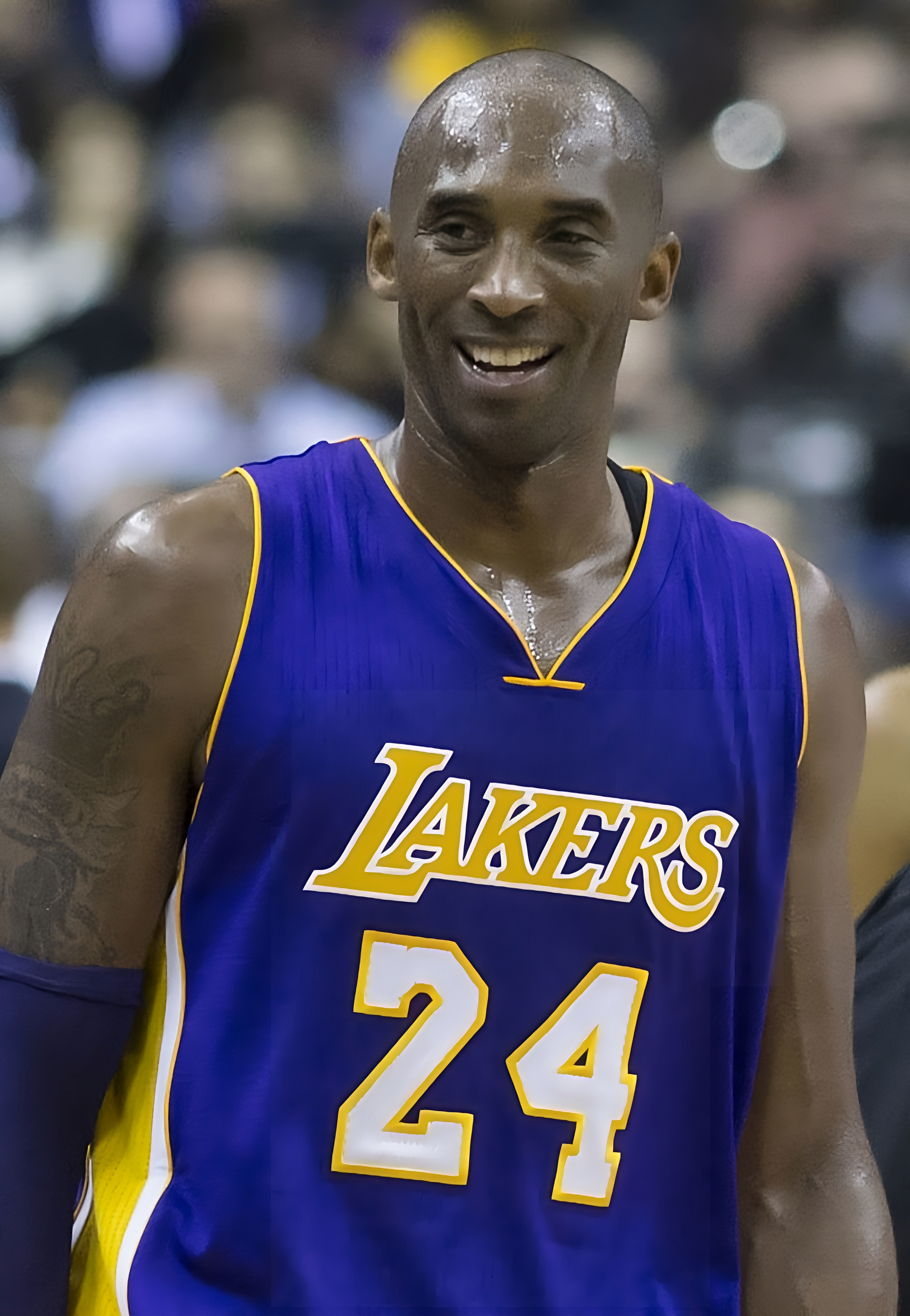
Kobe Bryant was named All-Star Game MVP four times and had the award named after him posthumously in 2020.

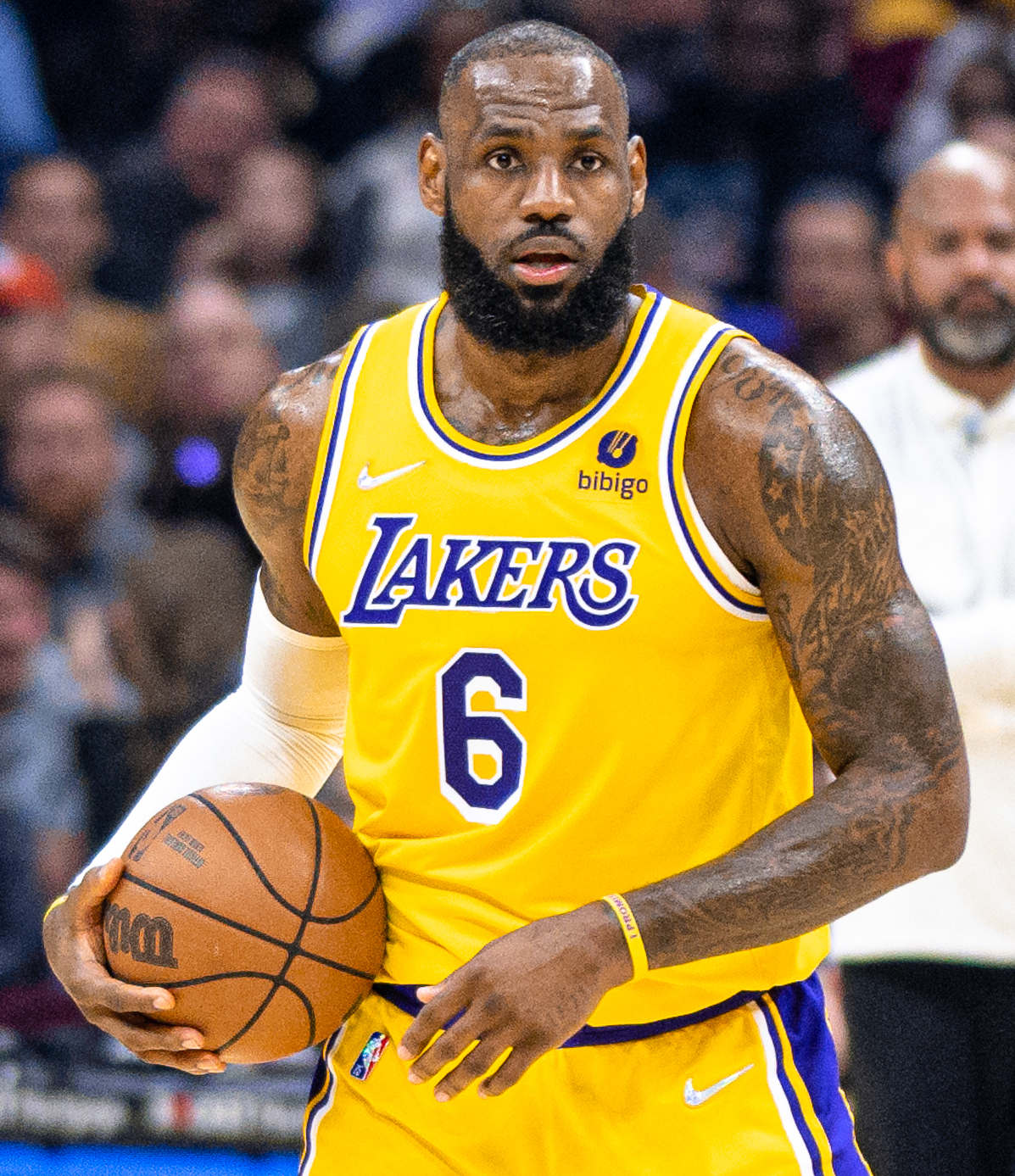
LeBron James holds the record for the most All-Star selections of all time with 22.

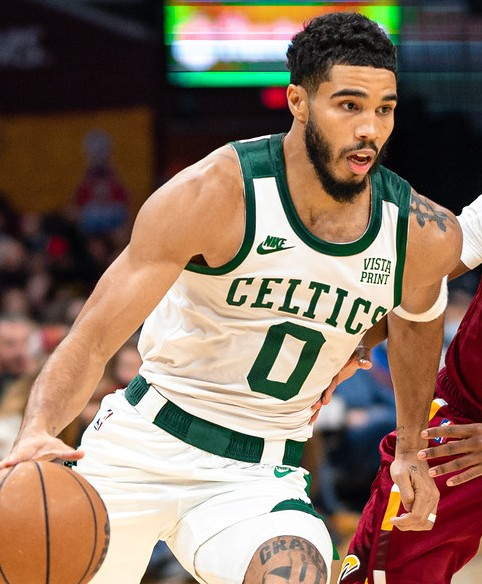
Jayson Tatum set the record for the most points scored in an All-Star Game in 2023, scoring 55.

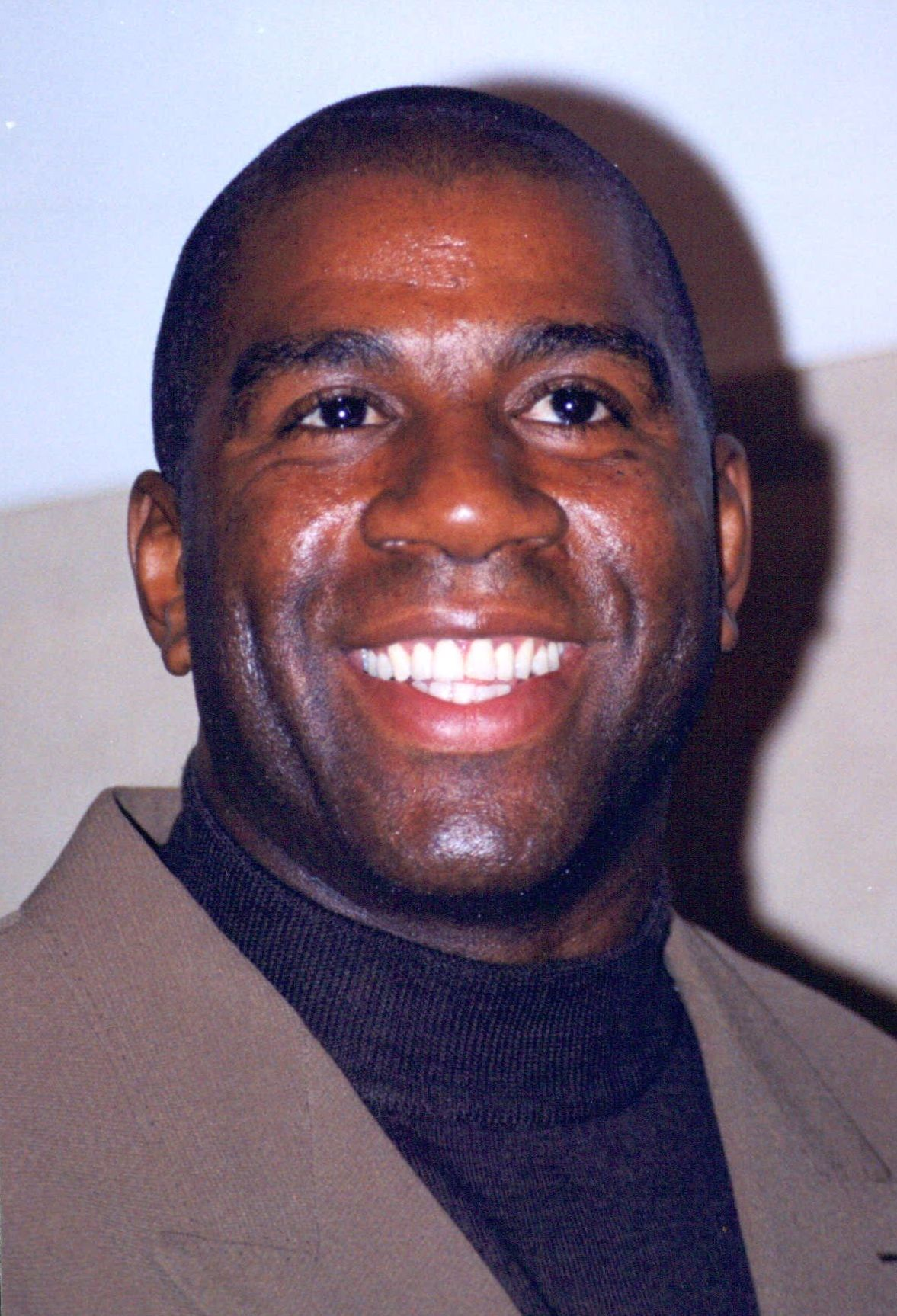
Magic Johnson set the record for the most assists in an All-Star Game in 1984 with 22.

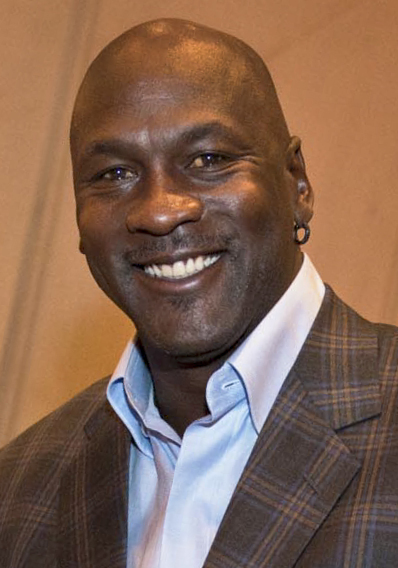
Michael Jordan was the first player to record a triple-double in an All-Star Game, doing so in 1997.

=== MVPs ===
- Most awards

- 4 by Bob Pettit (1 shared award) (1956, 1958, 1959, 1962)
- 4 by Kobe Bryant (1 shared award) (2002, 2007, 2009, 2011)

- Most consecutive awards

- 2 by Bob Pettit (1 shared award) (1958, 1959)
- 2 by Russell Westbrook (2015, 2016)

=== All-Star selections ===
- Most selections

- 22 by LeBron James

- Most consecutive selections

- 22 by LeBron James

- Most games played

- 21 by LeBron James

- Most games started

- 20 by LeBron James

=== Scoring ===
- Most points – career

- 434 by LeBron James

- Most points per game – career

- 31.0 by Jaylen Brown

- Most points – game

- 55 by Jayson Tatum (2023)

- Most points – half

- 40 by Karl-Anthony Towns (2024)

- Most points – quarter

- 31 by Karl-Anthony Towns (2024)
- 31 by Kawhi Leonard (2026)

=== Minutes ===
- Most minutes – career

- 536 by LeBron James

- Most minutes – game

- 42 by Oscar Robertson (1964)
- 42 by Bill Russell (1964)
- 42 by Jerry West (1964)
- 42 by Nate Thurmond (1967)

- Most minutes per game

- 33.3 by George Mikan

=== Rebounds ===
- Most rebounds – career

- 197 by Wilt Chamberlain

- Most offensive rebounds – career

- 44 by Moses Malone

- Most defensive rebounds – career

- 100 by LeBron James

- Most rebounds – game

- 27 by Bob Pettit (1962)

- Most rebounds per game

- 16.2 by Bob Pettit

- Most offensive rebounds – game

- 10 by Kobe Bryant (2011)

- Most offensive rebounds per game

- 4.3 by Shawn Marion

- Most defensive rebounds – game

- 19 by Dikembe Mutombo (2001)

- Most defensive rebounds per game

- 6.5 by Tim Duncan

- Most rebounds – half

- 16 by Bob Pettit (1962)
- 16 by Wilt Chamberlain (1960)

- Most rebounds – quarter

- 10 by Bob Pettit (1962)

=== Assists ===
- Most assists – career

- 128 by Chris Paul

- Most assists – game

- 22 by Magic Johnson (1984)

- Most assists per game

- 11.6 by Chris Paul

- Most assists – half

- 13 by Magic Johnson (1984)

- Most assists – quarter

- 9 by John Stockton (1989)

=== Field goals ===
- Highest field goal percentage – career

- .900 by Rudy Gobert

- Most field goals made – career

- 182 by LeBron James

- Most field goals made – game

- 26 by Anthony Davis (2017)

- Most field goals made – half

- 18 by Karl-Anthony Towns (2024)

- Most field goals made – quarter

- 14 by Karl-Anthony Towns (2024)

- Most field goals attempted – career

- 355 by LeBron James

- Most field goals attempted – game

- 39 by Anthony Davis (2017)

- Most field goals attempted – half

- 27 by Karl-Anthony Towns (2024)

- Most field goals attempted – quarter

- 19 by Karl-Anthony Towns (2024)

=== Free throws ===
- Highest free throw percentage – career

- 1.000 by Archie Clark
- 1.000 by Gary Payton
- 1.000 by Clyde Drexler

- Most free throws made – career

- 78 by Elgin Baylor

- Most free throws made – game

- 12 by Elgin Baylor (1962)
- 12 by Oscar Robertson (1965)

- Most free throws made – half

- 10 by Zelmo Beaty (1966)

- Most free throws made – quarter

- 9 by Zelmo Beaty (1966)
- 9 by Julius Erving (1978)

- Most free throws attempted – career

- 98 by Elgin Baylor
- 98 by Oscar Robertson

- Most free throws attempted – game

- 16 by Wilt Chamberlain (1962)

- Most free throws attempted – half

- 12 by Zelmo Beaty (1966)

- Most free throws attempted – quarter

- 11 by Julius Erving (1978)

=== Three-point shooting ===
- Highest three-point percentage – career

- .600 by Glen Rice

- Most three-point field goals made – career

- 51 by Stephen Curry

- Most three-point field goals made – game

- 16 by Stephen Curry (2022)

- Most three-point field goals made – half

- 9 by Jayson Tatum (2023)

- Most three-point field goals attempted – career

- 133 by LeBron James

- Most three-point field goals attempted – game

- 27 by Stephen Curry (2022)

- Most three-point field goals attempted – half

- 15 by Stephen Curry (2022)

=== Steals ===
- Most steals – career

- 38 by Kobe Bryant

- Most steals per game

- 3.2 by Rick Barry

- Most steals – game

- 8 by Rick Barry (1975)

- Most steals – half

- 5 by Larry Bird (1986)

- Most steals – quarter

- 4 by Fred Brown (1976)
- 4 by Larry Bird (1986)
- 4 by Isiah Thomas (1989)

=== Blocks ===
- Most blocks – career

- 31 by Kareem Abdul-Jabbar

- Most blocks per game

- 2.07 by Kareem Abdul-Jabbar

- Most blocks – game

- 6 by Kareem Abdul-Jabbar (1980)

- Most blocks – half

- 4 by Kareem Abdul-Jabbar (1980)
- 4 by Michael Jordan (1988)
- 4 by Hakeem Olajuwon (1994)

- Most blocks – quarter

- 4 by Kareem Abdul-Jabbar (1980)

=== Triple-doubles ===
- Michael Jordan – 14 points, 11 rebounds, 11 assists in 26 minutes (1997)
- LeBron James – 29 points, 12 rebounds, 10 assists in 32 minutes (2011)
- Dwyane Wade – 24 points, 10 rebounds, 10 assists in 33 minutes (2012)
- Kevin Durant – 21 points, 10 rebounds, 10 assists in 27 minutes (2017)

== Team ==
=== Scoring ===
- Most points – team
  - 211 by East All-Stars (2024)
- Most points – both teams
  - 397 (2024)
- Most points in a half – team
  - 107 by East All-Stars (2024)
- Most points in a half – both teams
  - 204 (2024)
- Most points in a quarter – team
  - 60 by Team LeBron (2021)
- Most points in a quarter – both teams
  - 103 (2024)
- Fewest points – team
  - 75 by East All-Stars (1953)
- Fewest points – both teams
  - 154 (1953)
- Largest margin of victory
  - 40 (153–113) by West All-Stars (1992)
- Smallest margin of victory
  - 1 (124–123) by East All-Stars (1965)
  - 1 (108–107) by West All-Stars (1971)
  - 1 (125–124) by West All-Stars (1977)
  - 1 (111–110) by East All-Stars (2001)

=== Field goals ===
- Highest field goal percentage – team
  - 0.653 (64/98) by West All-Stars (1992)
- Highest field goal percentage – both teams
  - 0.608 (155/255) (2023)
- Lowest field goal percentage – team
  - 0.292 (35/120) by West All-Stars (1966)
- Lowest field goal percentage – both teams
  - 0.362 (59/163) (1953)
- Most field goals made – team
  - 84 by West All-Stars (2017)
- Most field goals made – both teams
  - 163 (2024)
- Most field goals made in a half – team
  - 44 by Team Giannis (2023)
- Most field goals made in a half – both teams
  - 83 (2017)
- Most field goals made in a quarter – team
  - 22 by West All-Stars (2017)
- Most field goals made in a quarter – both teams
  - 42 (2017)
- Fewest field goals made – team
  - 25 by East All-Stars (1953)
- Fewest field goals made – both teams
  - 59 (1953)
- Most field goals attempted – team
  - 149 by West All-Stars (2016)
- Most field goals attempted – both teams
  - 289 (2024)
- Most field goals attempted in a half – team
  - 79 by West All-Stars (2016)
- Most field goals attempted in a half – both teams
  - 148 (2016)
- Most field goals attempted in a quarter – team
  - 41 by West All-Stars (2016)
- Most field goals attempted in a quarter – both teams
  - 77 (2016)
- Fewest field goals attempted – team
  - 66 by East All-Stars (1953)
- Fewest field goals attempted – both teams
  - 162 (1953)

=== Three-point field goals ===
- Most three-point field goals made – team
  - 42 by East All-Stars (2024)
- Most three-point field goals made – both teams
  - 67 (2024)
- Most three-point field goals attempted – team
  - 97 by East All-Stars (2024)
- Most three-point field goals attempted – both teams
  - 168 (2024)

=== Free throws ===
- Highest free throw percentage – team
  - 1.000 (18/18) by West All-Stars (1973)
  - 1.000 (9/9) by East All-Stars (2014)
  - 1.000 (4/4) by East All-Stars (2017)
  - 1.000 (1/1) by East All-Stars (2024)
- Highest free throw percentage – both teams
  - 0.875 (7/8) (2017)
- Lowest free throw percentage – team
  - 0.364 (4/11) by West All-Stars (2004)
- Lowest free throw percentage – both teams
  - 0.500 (16/32) (2004)
  - 0.500 (11/22) (2007)
  - 0.500 (14/28) (2008)
- Most free throws made – team
  - 40 by East All-Stars (1959)
- Most free throws made – both teams
  - 71 (OT) (1987)
  - 70 (1961)
- Most free throws made in a half – team
  - 26 by East All-Stars (1959)
- Most free throws made in a half – both teams
  - 36 (1961)
- Most free throws made in a quarter – team
  - 19 by East All-Stars (1986)
- Most free throws made in a quarter – both teams
  - 27 (1986)
- Fewest free throws made – team
  - 0 by Team LeBron (2023)
- Fewest free throws made – both teams
  - 3 (2023)
- Most free throws attempted – team
  - 57 by West All-Stars (1970)
- Most free throws attempted – both teams
  - 95 (1956)
- Most free throws attempted in a half – team
  - 31 by East All-Stars (1959)
- Most free throws attempted in a half – both teams
  - 57 (1962)
- Most free throws attempted in a quarter – team
  - 25 by West All-Stars (1970)
- Most free throws attempted in a quarter – both teams
  - 33 (1962)
  - 33 (OT) (1993)
- Fewest free throws attempted – team
  - 0 by Team LeBron (2023)
- Fewest free throws attempted – both teams
  - 4 (2023)

=== Rebounds ===
- Most rebounds recorded – team
  - 83 by East All-Stars (1966)
- Most rebounds recorded – both teams
  - 151 (1960)
- Most rebounds recorded in a half – team
  - 51 by East All-Stars (1966)
- Most rebounds recorded in a half – both teams
  - 98 (1962)
  - 98 (1966)
- Most rebounds recorded in a quarter – team
  - 30 by West All-Stars (1966)
- Most rebounds recorded in a quarter – both teams
  - 58 (1966)
- Fewest rebounds recorded – team
  - 37 by West All-Stars (1983)
- Fewest rebounds recorded – both teams
  - 89 (1983)

=== Assists ===
- Most assists – team
  - 60 by West All-Stars (2017)
  - 60 by West All-Stars (2024)
- Most assists – both teams
  - 106 (2024)
- Most assists in a half – team
  - 34 by West All-Stars (2017)
- Most assists in a half – both teams
  - 57 (2017)
- Most assists in a quarter – team
  - 20 by Team Giannis (2019)
- Most assists in a quarter – both teams
  - 30 (2019)
- Fewest assists – team
  - 15 by West All-Stars (1965)
- Fewest assists – both teams
  - 37 (1964)

=== Steals ===
- Most steals – team
  - 24 by East All-Stars (1989)
- Most steals – both teams
  - 40 (1989)

=== Blocks ===
- Most blocks – team
  - 16 (OT) by West All-Stars (1980)
  - 12 by West All-Stars (1994)
- Most blocks – both teams
  - 25 (OT) (1980)
  - 21 (1994)

== All-Star Weekend records ==
- Most Slam Dunk Contests won

- 3 by Nate Robinson (2006, 2009, 2010)
- 3 by Mac McClung (2023, 2024, 2025)

- Most consecutive Slam Dunk Contests won

- 3 by Mac McClung (2023, 2024, 2025)

- Most Three-Point Shootout Contests won

- 3 by Larry Bird (1986, 1987, 1988)
- 3 by Craig Hodges (1990, 1991, 1992)
- 3 by Damian Lillard (2023, 2024, 2026)

- Most consecutive Three-Point Shootout Contests won

- 3 by Larry Bird (1986, 1987, 1988)
- 3 by Craig Hodges (1990, 1991, 1992)

- Most Skills Challenge Contests won

- 2 by Dwyane Wade (2006, 2007)
- 2 by Steve Nash (2005, 2010)
- 2 by Damian Lillard (2013, 2014)
- 2 by Evan Mobley (2022, 2025)

- Most consecutive Skills Challenge Contests won

- 2 by Dwyane Wade (2006, 2007)
- 2 by Damian Lillard (2013, 2014)

- Youngest Slam Dunk Contest Champion

- Kobe Bryant (18 years, 169 days)

- Youngest Three-Point Shootout Contest Champion

- Kyrie Irving (20 years, 330 days)

- Youngest Skills Challenge Contest Champion

- Karl-Anthony Towns (20 years, 90 days)

- Oldest Slam Dunk Contest Champion

- Dominique Wilkins (30 years, 29 days)

- Oldest Three-Point Shootout Contest Champion

- Jeff Hornacek (36 years, 286 days)

- Oldest Skills Challenge Contest Champion

- Steve Nash (36 years, 6 days)

- Only player to win Slam Dunk Contest and All-Star Game MVP in the same year

- Michael Jordan (1988)

- Only player to win 3-point Contest and All-Star Game MVP in the same year

- Damian Lillard (2024)

== Other records ==
- Attendance

- 108,713 for the 2010 NBA All-Star Game which was held in Cowboys Stadium at Arlington, Texas — the largest attendance in history for any basketball game.

- Youngest All-Star Game MVP

- LeBron James (21 years, 51 days)

- Oldest All-Star Game MVP

- Shaquille O'Neal (36 years, 346 days)

- Youngest Rising Stars Challenge MVP

- Kyrie Irving (19 years, 338 days)

- Oldest Rising Stars Challenge MVP

- Bogdan Bogdanović (25 years, 182 days)

- Youngest player to start in an All-Star game

- Kobe Bryant (19 years, 170 days)

- Oldest player to start in an All-Star game

- Michael Jordan (39 years, 357 days)

== See also ==
- List of NBA regular season records
- List of NBA post-season records
