= List of NBA All-Star Game broadcasters =

The following is a list of American television and radio networks and announcers that have nationally broadcast the NBA All-Star Games throughout the years.

== Television ==
=== 2020s ===
Year	Network	Play-by-play	Color commentator(s)	Sideline reporter(s)	Studio host	Studio analyst(s)
2026	NBC/Peacock	Noah Eagle	Reggie Miller and Jamal Crawford	Zora Stephenson and Ashley ShahAhmadi	Ahmed Fareed	Carmelo Anthony, Vince Carter, and Tracy McGrady
2025	TNT/TBS/truTV/HBO Max	Brian Anderson	Reggie Miller, Kenny Smith, Charles Barkley, Shaquille O'Neal, and Candace Parker	Ernie Johnson and Kevin Hart	Adam Lefkoe	Draymond Green, Vince Carter, and Jalen Rose
2024	TNT/TBS/Max	Brian Anderson	Reggie Miller and Candace Parker	Allie LaForce	Ernie Johnson	Kenny Smith, Charles Barkley, Shaquille O'Neal, and Jamal Crawford
2024	truTV (All-Star Game Alt-Cast)/Max	Taylor Rooks	Charles Barkley and Draymond Green	Jamal Crawford	Ernie Johnson	Kenny Smith, Charles Barkley, Shaquille O'Neal, and Jamal Crawford
2023	TNT	Brian Anderson	Reggie Miller and Candace Parker	Dennis Scott	Ernie Johnson and Adam Lefkoe	Kenny Smith, Charles Barkley, Shaquille O'Neal, Grant Hill, and Jamal Crawford
2023	TBS (Inside the All-Star Game)	Ernie Johnson	Kenny Smith, Charles Barkley, and Shaquille O'Neal	Draymond Green	Ernie Johnson and Adam Lefkoe	Kenny Smith, Charles Barkley, Shaquille O'Neal, Grant Hill, and Jamal Crawford
2022	TNT	Kevin Harlan	Reggie Miller and Dwyane Wade	Allie LaForce	Ernie Johnson and Adam Lefkoe	Kenny Smith, Charles Barkley, Shaquille O'Neal, Grant Hill, and Isiah Thomas
2022	TBS (Inside the All-Star Game)	Ernie Johnson	Kenny Smith, Charles Barkley, and Shaquille O'Neal	Draymond Green	Ernie Johnson and Adam Lefkoe	Kenny Smith, Charles Barkley, Shaquille O'Neal, Grant Hill, and Isiah Thomas
2021	TNT/TBS	Marv Albert	Reggie Miller and Chris Webber	Allie LaForce	Ernie Johnson	Kenny Smith, Shaquille O'Neal, and Dwyane Wade
2020	TNT/TBS	Marv Albert	Reggie Miller and Grant Hill	Allie LaForce	Ernie Johnson	Kenny Smith, Charles Barkley, and Shaquille O'Neal

==== Notes ====
- The 2022 NBA All-Star Game was the first All-Star Game since 2000 (then aired on NBC) to not be called by Marv Albert, as he retired at the end of the 2020–21 NBA season. The game was televised nationally in the United States by TNT. Sister network TBS carried an alternate feed, Inside the All-Star Game, which featured a conversational presentation of the game featuring the Inside the NBA panel of Charles Barkley, Ernie Johnson, Shaquille O'Neal, and Kenny Smith, with guests such as Draymond Green. Coaches, referees, and selected players also wore microphones. In Canada, the game was televised nationally by Sportsnet.
- The 2021 NBA All-Star Game was broadcast by TNT for the 19th consecutive year. The game was seen by 5.94 million viewers, an 18% decrease over 2020 and the least-watched All-Star Game overall, but it beat CBS's Oprah with Meghan and Harry special in key demographic audience share. Additionally, this was the final NBA All-Star Game to ever be called by Marv Albert, as he announced his retirement from broadcasting following the 2021 Playoffs.
  - During the course of the 2021–22 NBA season, TNT anointed Kevin Harlan as its new lead play-by-play voice, assigning him to call the 2022 NBA All-Star Game and the Western Conference finals. Starting with the 2023 NBA All-Star Game, however, Brian Anderson took over play-by-play duties, but Harlan remains the play-by-play voice for TNT's conference finals coverage.
- The 2020 game was televised nationally by TNT for the 18th consecutive year, and simulcast by TBS for the 6th consecutive year. After airing a “Players Only” broadcast a year ago, TBS returned to simulcasting TNT's coverage, after the “Players Only” brand was canceled by the NBA and Turner Sports. Grant Hill also filled in for Chris Webber, as the latter was under the weather.
- Beginning with the 2026 game, NBC took over rights to the NBA All-Star Game. The 2026 game will mark the first time since 2002 (also previously aired on NBC) that the All-Star Game was broadcast on network television.
- The 2026 game started at 5pm ET rather than the customary 8pm ET in order to accommodate NBC's coverage of the 2026 Winter Olympics on primetime. Additionally, Noah Eagle and Ahmed Fareed were assigned to work the game due to Mike Tirico and Maria Taylor hosting primetime and late night coverage of the Winter Olympics.

=== 2010s ===
Year	Network	Play-by-play	Color commentator(s)	Sideline reporter(s)	Studio host	Studio analyst(s)
2019	TNT	Marv Albert	Reggie Miller and Chris Webber	Kristen Ledlow	Ernie Johnson	Kenny Smith, Shaquille O'Neal, and Candace Parker
2019	TBS (Players Only)	Greg Anthony	Charles Barkley and Kevin Garnett	Dennis Scott	Ernie Johnson	Kenny Smith, Shaquille O'Neal, and Candace Parker
2018	TNT/TBS	Marv Albert	Chris Webber and Reggie Miller	David Aldridge and Kristen Ledlow	Ernie Johnson	Kenny Smith, Charles Barkley, and Shaquille O'Neal
2017	TNT/TBS	Marv Albert	Chris Webber and Reggie Miller	David Aldridge and Kristen Ledlow	Ernie Johnson	Kenny Smith, Charles Barkley, and Shaquille O'Neal
2016	TNT/TBS	Marv Albert	Chris Webber and Reggie Miller	Craig Sager and David Aldridge	Ernie Johnson	Kenny Smith, Charles Barkley, and Shaquille O'Neal
2015	TNT/TBS	Marv Albert	Reggie Miller and Chris Webber	David Aldridge and Rachel Nichols	Ernie Johnson	Kenny Smith, Charles Barkley, and Shaquille O'Neal
2014	TNT	Marv Albert	Steve Kerr and Reggie Miller	Craig Sager, David Aldridge, Grant Hill, and Chris Webber	Ernie Johnson	Kenny Smith, Charles Barkley, and Shaquille O'Neal
2013	TNT	Marv Albert	Steve Kerr and Reggie Miller	Craig Sager and David Aldridge	Ernie Johnson	Kenny Smith, Charles Barkley, Chris Webber, and Shaquille O'Neal
2012	TNT	Marv Albert	Steve Kerr and Reggie Miller	Craig Sager and David Aldridge	Ernie Johnson	Kenny Smith, Charles Barkley, Chris Webber, and Shaquille O'Neal
2011	TNT	Marv Albert	Steve Kerr and Reggie Miller	Craig Sager and David Aldridge	Ernie Johnson	Kenny Smith, Charles Barkley, Chris Webber, and Kevin McHale
2010	TNT	Marv Albert	Doug Collins and Reggie Miller	Craig Sager and David Aldridge	Ernie Johnson	Kenny Smith and Charles Barkley

==== Notes ====
- The 2017 game was originally scheduled to be played at Spectrum Center in Charlotte, North Carolina, home of the Charlotte Hornets. However, because of a new anti-LGBT bill being passed in North Carolina, the NBA relocated the game, and all other All-Star festivities to New Orleans.

=== 2000s ===
Year	Network	Play-by-play	Color commentator(s)	Sideline reporter(s)	Studio host	Studio analyst(s)
2009	TNT	Marv Albert	Doug Collins and Reggie Miller	Craig Sager and David Aldridge	Ernie Johnson	Kenny Smith and Chris Webber
2008	TNT	Marv Albert	Doug Collins and Reggie Miller	Craig Sager and David Aldridge	Ernie Johnson	Kenny Smith, Charles Barkley, and Magic Johnson
2007	TNT	Marv Albert	Doug Collins and Steve Kerr	Craig Sager and David Aldridge	Ernie Johnson	Kenny Smith, Charles Barkley, and Magic Johnson
2006	TNT	Marv Albert	Doug Collins and Steve Kerr	Craig Sager and David Aldridge	Ernie Johnson	Kenny Smith, Charles Barkley, and Magic Johnson
2005	TNT	Marv Albert	Doug Collins and Steve Kerr	Craig Sager, Cheryl Miller, and David Aldridge	Ernie Johnson	Kenny Smith, Charles Barkley, and Magic Johnson
2004	TNT	Marv Albert	Mike Fratello and Doug Collins	Craig Sager and Cheryl Miller	Ernie Johnson	Kenny Smith, Charles Barkley, and Magic Johnson
2003	TNT	Marv Albert	Mike Fratello and Jeff Van Gundy	Craig Sager and Cheryl Miller	Ernie Johnson	Kenny Smith, Charles Barkley, and Magic Johnson
2002	NBC	Marv Albert	Bill Walton and Steve Jones	Jim Gray and Lewis Johnson	Ahmad Rashad	Jayson Williams, Pat Croce and Mike Fratello
2001	NBC	Marv Albert	Doug Collins	Jim Gray and Lewis Johnson	Ahmad Rashad	Kevin Johnson and P. J. Carlesimo
2000	NBC	Bob Costas (SD broadcast)	Doug Collins (SD broadcast)	Ahmad Rashad and Jim Gray (SD broadcast)	Hannah Storm	Isiah Thomas and Peter Vescey
2000	NBC	Mike Breen (HD broadcast)	Bill Walton and Steve Jones (HD broadcast)	Lisa Malosky (HD broadcast)	Hannah Storm	Isiah Thomas and Peter Vescey

==== Notes ====
- The 2003 NBA All-Star Game on TNT marked the first time that the game was broadcast by a cable television network.
- For the 2001–2002, NBC's studio team consisted of Ahmad Rashad and Hannah Storm with former Philadelphia 76ers owner Pat Croce, the returning Mike Fratello, and former player Jayson Williams. The tandem stayed together through the 2002 NBA All-Star Game. During the week between the All-Star Game and NBC's next scheduled telecast, Williams was arrested after shooting and killing his limousine driver. He was promptly fired by NBC, which also did not return Croce or Fratello to studio coverage. Instead, the network brought in Tom Tolbert, who had only recently been added to NBC Sports as a third-string analyst paired with Mike Breen. Tolbert stayed on as the lone studio analyst through the end of the season, and won acclaim by several in the media, including USA Today sports columnist Rudy Martzke. Hannah Storm was not able to anchor the 2002 NBA All-Star Game as she was on assignment at the 2002 Winter Olympics in Salt Lake City serving as daytime studio host; Rashad solo anchored from the studio.
- The 2002 game started at 5pm ET rather than the customary 8pm ET start in order to accommodate NBC's coverage of the 2002 Winter Olympics.
- NBC employed an alternate HD broadcast of the 2000 All-Star Game alongside a regular SD broadcast.

=== 1990s ===
Year	Network	Play-by-play	Color commentator(s)	Sideline reporter(s)	Studio host	Studio analyst(s)
1998	NBC	Bob Costas	Isiah Thomas and Bill Walton	Ahmad Rashad and Jim Gray	Hannah Storm	John Salley and Peter Vescey
1997	NBC	Marv Albert	Matt Guokas and Bill Walton	Ahmad Rashad, Jim Gray and Steve Jones	Bob Costas	Julius Erving, Magic Johnson and Larry Bird
1996	NBC	Marv Albert	Matt Guokas and Steve Jones	Ahmad Rashad, Jim Gray and Hannah Storm	Bob Costas	Julius Erving and Magic Johnson
1995	NBC	Marv Albert	Matt Guokas and Steve Jones	Ahmad Rashad and Hannah Storm	Bob Costas	Julius Erving and Peter Vescey
1994	NBC	Dick Enberg	Steve Jones and Magic Johnson	Ahmad Rashad and Hannah Storm	Bob Costas	Julius Erving
1993	NBC	Dick Enberg	Mike Fratello and Magic Johnson	Ahmad Rashad and Hannah Storm	Bob Costas	Quinn Buckner
1992	NBC	Dick Enberg	Mike Fratello	Ahmad Rashad	Bob Costas	Quinn Buckner
1991	NBC	Bob Costas	Mike Fratello	Ahmad Rashad and Steve Jones	Bob Costas	Pat Riley, Bob Ferry and Peter Vecsey
1990	CBS	Dick Stockton	Hubie Brown	Lesley Visser and James Brown	Pat O'Brien	

==== Notes ====
- In 1991, Bob Costas replaced for Marv Albert on play-by-play for NBC's coverage, as Marv Albert was away grieving the death of his mother.

=== 1980s ===
Year	Network	Play-by-play	Color commentator(s)	Sideline reporter(s)
1989	CBS	Dick Stockton	Hubie Brown	Pat O'Brien, Lesley Visser, and James Brown
1988	CBS	Dick Stockton	Billy Cunningham	Pat O'Brien and Lesley Visser
1987	CBS	Dick Stockton	Tom Heinsohn	Pat O'Brien and Lesley Visser
1986	CBS	Dick Stockton	Tom Heinsohn	Pat O'Brien and Lesley Visser
1985	CBS	Dick Stockton	Tom Heinsohn	Pat O'Brien and Lesley Visser
1984	CBS	Dick Stockton	Tom Heinsohn	Pat O'Brien and Lesley Visser
1983	CBS	Dick Stockton	Bill Russell	Pat O'Brien, Brent Musburger, and Kevin Loughery
1982	CBS	Dick Stockton	Bill Russell	Brent Musburger and Kevin Loughery
1981	CBS	Gary Bender	Rick Barry and Bill Russell	Brent Musburger and Rod Hundley
1980	CBS	Brent Musburger	Bill Russell and Rod Hundley	Gary Bender

=== 1970s ===
Year	Network	Play-by-play	Color commentator(s)	Sideline reporter(s)
1979	CBS	Brent Musburger	Steve Jones and John Havlicek	Frank Glieber
1978	CBS	Brent Musburger	Keith Erickson	Don Criqui
1977	CBS	Brent Musburger	Billy Cunningham	Don Criqui
1976	CBS	Brent Musburger	Mendy Rudolph	Sonny Hill
1975	CBS	Brent Musburger	Oscar Robertson	Jack Whitaker
1974	CBS	Pat Summerall	Rod Hundley and Elgin Baylor	
1973	ABC	Chris Schenkel	Bill Russell	Keith Jackson
1972	ABC	Keith Jackson	Bill Russell	Dave Diles
1971	ABC	Chris Schenkel	Jack Twyman	
1970	ABC	Chris Schenkel	Jack Twyman	

=== 1960s ===
Year	Network	Play-by-play	Color commentator(s)
1969	ABC	Chris Schenkel	Jack Twyman
1968	ABC	Chris Schenkel	Jack Twyman
1967	SNI	Chick Hearn	
1966	SNI	Harry Caray	
1965	SNI	Harry Caray	Bill Sharman
1964	SNI	Marty Glickman (first half); Buddy Blattner (second half)	Carl Braun (first half); Ed Macauley (second half)
1963	SNI	Chick Hearn	Bud Blattner

=== 1950s ===
Year	Network	Play-by-play	Color commentator(s)
1959	NBC	Curt Gowdy	
1957	WPIX	Bob Wolff	Sonny Hertzberg and Jack McCarthy (in the studio)
1956	WPIX	Bud Palmer	Bob Wolff and Harry Wismer
1954	WPIX	Bud Palmer	Jimmy Powers and Kevin Kennedy
1952	WPIX	Bud Palmer	Jimmy Powers

==== Notes ====
- The 1959 NBA All-Star Game marked the first time that the game was nationally televised. However, NBC only broadcast the second half at 10:00 pm. Eastern Time, in lieu of their Friday Night Fights telecast.

=== Viewership averages ===
NBA All-Star Game TV ratings (1990–present)
Year	Network	Results	Rating/Share	Viewership
2019	TNT, TBS	Team LeBron 178, Team Giannis 164	3.8	6.80M
2018	TNT, TBS	Team LeBron 148, Team Stephen 145	4.3	7.65M
2017	TNT, TBS	West 192, East 182	4.2/7	7.75M
2016	TNT, TBS	West 196, East 173	4.3/7	7.61M
2015	TNT, TBS	West 163, East 158	4.3/7	7.18M
2014	TNT	East 163, West 155	4.3/7	7.51M
2013	TNT	West 143, East 138	4.6/8	8.02M
2012	TNT	West 152, East 149	4.4/7	7.07M
2011	TNT	West 148, East 143	5.2/9	9.09M
2010	TNT	East 141, West 139	3.8/6	6.85M
2009	TNT	West 146, East 119	4.5/7	7.62M
2008	TNT	East 134, West 128	3.8/6	6.33M
2007	TNT	West 153, East 132	4.2/7	6.84M
2006	TNT	East 122, West 120	4.3/8	7.07M
2005	TNT	East 125, West 115	4.9/8	8.08M
2004	TNT	West 136, East 132	5.1/10	8.19M
2003	TNT	West 155, East 145	6.6/12	10.83M
2002	NBC	West 135, East 120	8.2/15	13.10M
2001	NBC	East 111, West 110	5.1/8	7.76M
2000	NBC	West 137, East 126	6.9/12	10.52M
1999	Cancelled due to owners' Lockout			
1998	NBC	East 135, West 114	10.6/17	16.93M
1997	NBC	East 132, West 120	11.2/19	16.90M
1996	NBC	East 129, West 118	11.7/20	17.46M
1995	NBC	West 139, East 112	10.7/17	15.78M
1994	NBC	East 127, West 118	9.1/14	13.67M
1993	NBC	West 135, East 132	14.3/22	22.91M
1992	NBC	West 153, East 113	12.8/26	18.83M
1991	NBC	East 116, West 113	7.8/21	10.61M
1990	CBS	East 130, West 113	9.5/13	13.20M

== Radio ==
=== 2020s ===
Year	Network	Play-by-play	Color commentator(s)	Sideline reporter(s)	Studio host	Studio analyst(s)
2026	ESPN	Marc Kestecher	P. J. Carlesimo	Jorge Sedano	Jim Basquil	
2025	ESPN	Marc Kestecher	P. J. Carlesimo	Jorge Sedano	Kevin Winters	
2024	ESPN	Marc Kestecher	P. J. Carlesimo	Jorge Sedano	Kevin Winters	
2023	ESPN	Marc Kestecher	P. J. Carlesimo	Ros Gold-Onwude and Monica McNutt	Kevin Winters	
2022	ESPN	Marc Kestecher	P. J. Carlesimo	Ros Gold-Onwude and Monica McNutt	Kevin Winters	Monica McNutt
2021	ESPN	Marc Kestecher	Jon Barry		Kevin Winters	P. J. Carlesimo
2020	ESPN	Marc Kestecher	Jon Barry	Ramona Shelburne	Kevin Winters	P. J. Carlesimo

=== 2010s ===
Year	Network	Play-by-play	Color commentator(s)	Sideline reporter(s)	Studio host	Studio analyst(s)
2019	ESPN	Marc Kestecher	Jon Barry	Ramona Shelburne	Kevin Winters	P. J. Carlesimo
2018	ESPN	Marc Kestecher	Jon Barry	Ramona Shelburne	Kevin Winters	P. J. Carlesimo
2017	ESPN	Marc Kestecher	Jon Barry	Marc Stein and Shelley Smith	Kevin Winters	P. J. Carlesimo
2016	ESPN	Kevin Calabro	Jon Barry	Marc Stein and Shelley Smith	Marc Kestecher	P. J. Carlesimo
2015	ESPN	Kevin Calabro	Jon Barry	Marc Stein	Marc Kestecher	P. J. Carlesimo
2014	ESPN	Kevin Calabro	Jon Barry	Marc Stein and Shelley Smith	Marc Kestecher	P. J. Carlesimo
2013	ESPN	Kevin Calabro	Jack Ramsay	Marc Stein and Shelley Smith	Marc Kestecher	Chris Mullin
2012	ESPN	Jim Durham	Jack Ramsay	Ric Bucher and Shelley Smith	Marc Kestecher	Will Perdue
2011	ESPN	Jim Durham	Jack Ramsay	Ric Bucher and Shelley Smith	Marc Kestecher	Will Perdue
2010	ESPN	Jim Durham	Jack Ramsay	Ric Bucher and Shelley Smith	Marc Kestecher	Will Perdue

=== 2000s ===
Year	!Network	Play-by-play	Color commentator(s)	Sideline reporter(s)	Studio host	Studio analyst(s)
2009	ESPN	Jim Durham	Jack Ramsay	Ric Bucher and Shelley Smith	Marc Kestecher	Will Perdue
2008	ESPN	Jim Durham	Jack Ramsay	Ric Bucher and Shelley Smith	Marc Kestecher	Will Perdue
2007	ESPN	Jim Durham	Jack Ramsay	Ric Bucher and Shelley Smith	Marc Kestecher	Will Perdue
2006	ESPN	Jim Durham	Jack Ramsay			
2005	ESPN	Jim Durham	James Worthy			
2004	ESPN	Jim Durham	Jack Ramsay			
2003	ESPN	Jim Durham	Jack Ramsay	Greg Anthony and Vinny Del Negro	Doug Brown	Kevin Loughery
2002	ESPN	Jim Durham	Jack Ramsay			
2001	ESPN	Jim Durham	Jack Ramsay			
2000	ESPN	Jim Durham	Jack Ramsay			

=== 1990s ===
Year	Network	Play-by-play	Color commentator(s)	Sideline reporter(s)
1998	ESPN	Brent Musburger	Jack Ramsay	
1997	ESPN	Brent Musburger	Jack Ramsay	
1996	ESPN	Brent Musburger	Jack Ramsay	
1995	NBA	Joe McConnell	Wes Unseld	Glenn Ordway
1994	NBA	Joe McConnell	Bob Lanier	
1993	NBA	Joe McConnell	Bob Lanier and Quinn Buckner	
1992	NBA	Marv Albert	Bob Lanier	Tom Hanneman
1991	NBA	Joe McConnell	Frank Layden	Chet Coppock
1990	ABC	Fred Manfra	Steve Jones and Earl Monroe	

=== 1980s ===
Year	Network	Play-by-play	Color commentator(s)	Sideline reporter(s)
1989	ABC	Marv Albert	Rod Hundley	Fred Manfra
1988	ABC	Chick Hearn	Johnny Most	Fred Manfra
1987	ABC	Fred Manfra	Rod Hundley	
1986	ABC	Fred Manfra	Dave Barnett	
1985	ABC	Fred Manfra	Oscar Robertson	
1984	Mutual	Tony Roberts		
1983	Mutual	Tony Roberts	Tom Heinsohn	
1982	Mutual			
1981	Mutual	Joe Tait		
1980	Mutual	Tony Roberts	Johnny Orr	

=== 1970s ===
Year	Network	Play-by-play	Color commentator(s)	Sideline reporter(s)
1979	Mutual	Tony Roberts	Hubie Brown	
1978	Mutual	Skip Caray	Gene Peterson	Bill Schonely
1977	Mutual	Eddie Doucette	Rod Hundley	
1976	Mutual	Bill Campbell	Bill Schonely	
1975	Mutual			
1974	Mutual	Marv Albert	Bob Blackburn	
1973	Mutual	Jack Fleming		
1972	Mutual	Chick Hearn	Lynn Shackelford	
1971	Mutual	Chick Hearn	Art Eckman	
1970	Mutual	Chick Hearn	Andy Musser	

=== 1960s ===
Year	Network	Play-by-play	Color commentator(s)
1969	Mutual	Chick Hearn	Jim Karvellas
1968	AFRS	Marv Albert	
1967			
1966	CBS	Jerry Gross	Jack Buck
1965	CBS	Jerry Gross	Jack Buck
1964	CBS	Jerry Gross	Jack Buck
1963	Syndication	Jerry Gross	Dolph Schayes
1962	KHJ	Chick Hearn	
1961			
1960			

=== 1950s ===
Year	Network	Play-by-play	Color commentator(s)
1959	Syndication	Don Dunphy	Win Elliot
1958	AFRS		
1957			
1956			
1955	Mutual	Harry Wismer	Art Gleeson
1954	WMGM (in New York); WHDH (in Boston)	Marty Glickman; Johnny Most	Bert Lee Jr.
1953	Syndication	Marty Glickman	Jim Gordon
1952	Liberty	Marty Glickman	Johnny Most
1951	Liberty	Marty Glickman	Hilliard Gates
