= 1972 NBA All-Star Game =

Exhibition basketball game

	1	2	3	4	Total
West	27	27	33	25	112
East	33	31	20	26	110
- Date: January 18, 1972
- Arena: The Forum
- City: Inglewood
- MVP: Jerry West
- Attendance: 17,214
- Network: ABC
- Announcers: Keith Jackson and Bill Russell

NBA All-Star Game
< 1971	1973 >

The 22nd Annual NBA All-Star Game was an exhibition basketball played on January 18, 1972, at The Forum in Inglewood, California, the home of the Los Angeles Lakers. This was the second All-Star Game to be held in the Los Angeles metropolitan area and to be hosted by the Lakers, after it was held in 1963 at the Los Angeles Memorial Sports Arena, the Lakers' previous home arena.

The West All-Stars defeated the East All-Stars 112–110, with Jerry West of the Lakers winning the Most Valuable Player award after he scored 13 points and grabbed 6 rebounds. West also hit a last-second 20-foot (6.1 m) jump shot to break the tie and win the game for the team.

Dave Cowens, a future MVP and Hall of Famer, made his All-Star debut in this game. Center Bob Lanier, inducted into the Hall of Fame in 1992, made his debut in this All-Star Game as well. The Houston Rockets, which relocated from San Diego to Houston before the 1971–72 season, had their first Houston-era All-Star in Elvin Hayes.

== Coaches ==
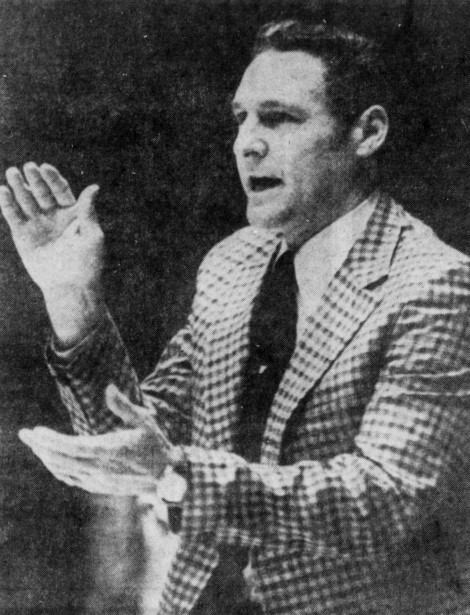
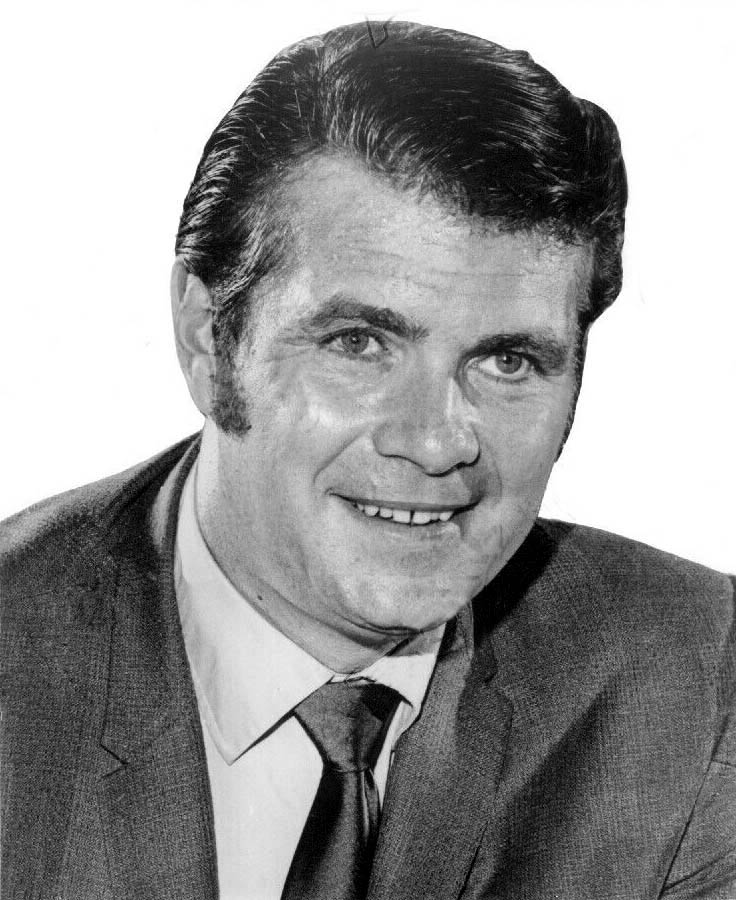
Bill Sharman and Tom Heinsohn were selected as the West and East head coach, respectively.

Bill Sharman, head coach of the Western Conference leader Los Angeles Lakers, was named as coach for the Western All-Stars. Tom Heinsohn, head coach of the Eastern Conference leader Boston Celtics, was named as coach for the Eastern All-Stars.

== Eastern Conference ==
Player, Team	MIN	FGM	FGA	FTM	FTA	REB	AST	PF	PTS
John Havlicek, BOS	24	5	13	5	5	3	5	2	15
Billy Cunningham, PHI	24	4	13	6	8	10	3	4	14
Dave Cowens, BOS	32	5	12	4	5	20	1	4	14
Lou Hudson, ATL	18	2	7	2	2	3	3	3	6
Walt Frazier, NY	25	7	11	1	2	3	5	2	15
John Johnson, CLE	3	0	2	0	0	1	0	1	0
Bob Kauffman, BUF	7	1	1	0	0	1	1	3	2
Jack Marin, BAL	15	5	8	1	1	0	1	2	11
Wes Unseld, BAL	16	1	5	0	0	7	1	3	2
Tom Van Arsdale, CIN	4	0	1	0	0	1	0	0	0
Jo Jo White, BOS	18	6	15	0	2	4	3	1	12
Butch Beard, CLE	7	1	4	1	1	1	0	0	3
Archie Clark, BAL	21	2	5	4	4	1	6	1	8
Dave DeBusschere, NY	26	4	8	0	0	11	0	2	8
Totals	240	43	105	24	30	66	26	28	110

== Western Conference ==
Player, Team	MIN	FGM	FGA	FTM	FTA	REB	AST	PF	PTS
Bob Love, CHI	16	4	11	0	2	6	0	1	8
Spencer Haywood, SEA	25	4	10	3	4	7	1	2	11
Kareem Abdul-Jabbar, MIL	19	5	10	2	2	7	2	0	12
Gail Goodrich, LA	14	2	7	0	0	1	2	2	4
Jerry West, LA	27	6	9	1	2	6	5	2	13
Oscar Robertson, MIL	24	3	9	5	10	3	3	4	11
Cazzie Russell, GS	20	4	13	2	2	1	0	1	10
Paul Silas, PHO	15	0	6	2	3	9	1	1	2
Jimmy Walker, DET	16	4	9	2	5	2	1	1	10
Connie Hawkins, PHO	14	5	7	3	4	4	0	1	13
Elvin Hayes, HOU	11	1	6	2	2	2	0	2	4
Wilt Chamberlain, LA	24	3	3	2	8	10	3	2	8
Bob Lanier, DET	5	0	2	2	3	3	0	0	2
Sidney Wicks, POR	10	2	5	0	0	2	0	3	4
Totals	240	43	107	26	47	63	18	22	112

== Score by periods ==
Score by periods:	1	2	3	4	Final
Western Conference	27	27	33	25	112
Eastern Conference	33	31	20	26	110

- Halftime— East, 64–54
- Third Quarter— West, 87–84
- Officials: Darell Garretson and Manny Sokol
- Attendance: 17,214
