= Rudy LaRusso =

American basketball player (1937–2004)

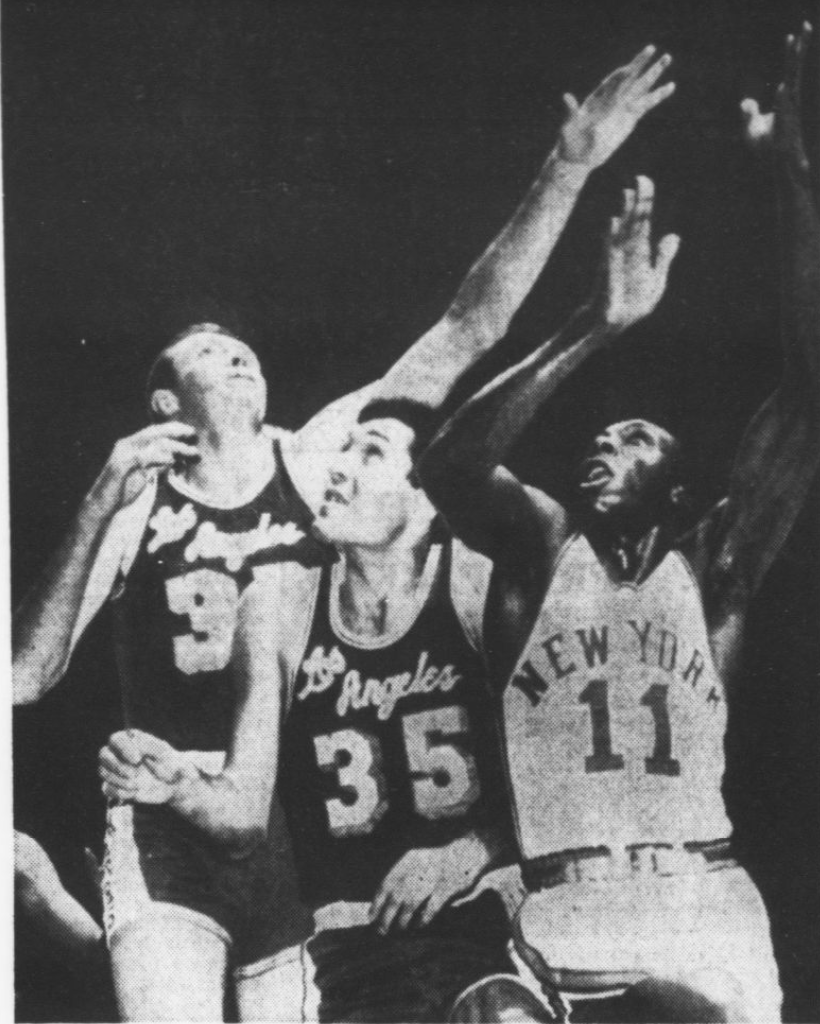
- LaRusso (35) getting fouled by Johnny Green (11) of the New York Knickerbockers in 1963

Personal information
- Born: November 11, 1937 Brooklyn, New York, U.S.
- Died: July 9, 2004 (aged 66) Los Angeles, California, U.S.
- Listed height: 6 ft 8 in (2.03 m)
- Listed weight: 220 lb (100 kg)

Career information
- High school: James Madison (Brooklyn, New York)
- College: Dartmouth (1956–1959)
- NBA draft: 1959: 2nd round, 10th overall pick
- Drafted by: Minneapolis Lakers
- Playing career: 1959–1969
- Position: Power forward / center
- Number: 35

Career history
- 1959–1967: Minneapolis / Los Angeles Lakers
- 1967–1969: San Francisco Warriors

Career highlights
- 5× NBA All-Star (1962, 1963, 1966, 1968, 1969); NBA All-Defensive Second Team (1969)

Career statistics
- Points: 11,507 (15.6 ppg)
- Rebounds: 6,936 (9.4 rpg)
- Assists: 1,556 (2.1 apg)
- Stats at NBA.com
- Stats at Basketball Reference

Rudolph A. LaRusso (November 11, 1937 – July 9, 2004) was an American professional basketball player and five-time All-Star in the National Basketball Association (NBA). He was nicknamed "Brutus" and "Roughhouse Rudy" because of his physicality and competitive spirit on the court.

== Early life ==
LaRusso was Jewish, born in Brooklyn, New York. He attended James Madison High School in Brooklyn. LaRusso, whose mother was Jewish and father was Italian, won All-City honors and was later inducted into the New York City Basketball Hall of Fame. He attended and graduated from Dartmouth College. In 1959, playing for Dartmouth, he grabbed 32 rebounds in a game against Columbia, tying an Ivy League record. He also set Dartmouth records for rebounds in a season (503) and career (1,239), and was twice named All-Ivy League.

== Professional career ==
=== Minneapolis/Los Angeles Lakers (1960–1967) ===
LaRusso was selected by the Minneapolis Lakers in the second round of the 1959 NBA draft out of Dartmouth College. He played eight years with them and two more for the San Francisco Warriors. On November 26, 1959, he scored 15 points and 20 rebounds in a 114-95 loss to the Cincinnati Royals. He became the second Lakers rookie to have grabbed at least 20 rebounds in a single game, joining teammate Elgin Baylor. On February 24, 1960, he scored a season-high 27 points in a 131-110 setback against the Boston Celtics.

In his second year, LaRusso slightly improved his statistics from his rookie season. In his second game of the season, LaRusso recorded a career-high 28 points in a 112-97 loss to the St. Louis Hawks.

In 1962, he scored 50 points against the Hawks, at that point the most ever by a Jewish NBA basketball player. in a game for the Lakers against the Hawks. In 1967–68, he finished seventh in scoring league-wide with a career-best average of 21.8 points per game.

=== San Francisco Warriors (1967–1969) ===
Lakers owner Jack Kent Cooke made a push to trade LaRusso in the midst of a subpar 1966-67 season, reportedly calling him a "brute" around the basket. On January 16, 1967, a proposed three-team trade would send him to the Detroit Pistons along with a first-round draft pick, while Mel Counts headed to the Lakers. In turn, the Pistons would ship Ray Scott to the Baltimore Bullets. However, LaRusso refused to report to the Pistons, stating that he did not want to uproot his wife who was seven months pregnant. He already had contemplated retirement from the game to become a stockbroker. The Bullets did not budge despite the Pistons and Lakers having second thoughts about the transaction. When the league ruled the trade to be valid, the Pistons suspended LaRusso, who promptly retired. In August, his rights were sold to the San Francisco Warriors.

LaRusso had two solid seasons with the Warriors, playing more than 75 games and averaging more than 20 points in each one while being selected an All-Star both times. He retired after the 1968-69 season to become an investment banker and sports agent.

== Player profile ==
LaRusso was a five-time All-Star and was known for his rebounding, tight defense, toughness, and presence.

== Personal life ==
LaRusso had a small cameo role in the Gilligan's Island third-season episode "Bang! Bang! Bang!" as 'Agent Michaels'.

He died of Parkinson's disease in 2004. He has a son, Corey LaRusso, and a daughter from another marriage, Christine Larusso, a Los Angeles-based poet.

== Career statistics ==
Legend
GP	Games played	GS	Games started	MPG	Minutes per game
FG%	Field goal percentage	3P%	3-point field goal percentage	FT%	Free throw percentage
RPG	Rebounds per game	APG	Assists per game	SPG	Steals per game
BPG	Blocks per game	PPG	Points per game	**Bold**	Career high
*	Led the league

=== NBA ===
==== Regular season ====
Year	Team	GP	MPG	FG%	FT%	RPG	APG	PPG
1959–60	Minneapolis	71	29.5	.389	.742	9.6	1.2	13.7
1960–61	L.A. Lakers	79*	32.8	.419	.790	9.9	1.7	14.6
1961–62	L.A. Lakers	**80***	34.4	**.466**	.763	**10.4**	2.2	17.2
1962–63	L.A. Lakers	75	33.4	.422	.718	10.0	2.5	12.3
1963–64	L.A. Lakers	79	34.8	.434	.751	10.1	2.4	12.3
1964–65	L.A. Lakers	77	33.6	.461	.773	9.4	**2.6**	14.1
1965–66	L.A. Lakers	76	30.5	.457	.787	8.7	2.2	15.4
1966–67	L.A. Lakers	45	28.7	.415	.696	7.8	1.7	12.8
1967–68	San Francisco	79	35.7	.433	.790	9.4	2.3	**21.8**
1968–69	San Francisco	75	**37.1**	.410	**.794**	8.3	2.1	20.7
Career		736	33.3	.431	.767	9.4	2.1	15.6
All-Star		4	17.5	.481	.333	4.3	1.5	7.3

==== Playoffs ====
Year	Team	GP	MPG	FG%	FT%	RPG	APG	PPG
1960	Minneapolis	9	35.7	.424	.771	7.8	2.4	15.4
1961	L.A. Lakers	12*	30.0	.396	.667	8.0	2.0	12.2
1962	L.A. Lakers	13	35.5	.365	.758	9.1	1.7	14.1
1963	L.A. Lakers	13*	35.8	.422	.760	9.8	2.2	14.4
1964	L.A. Lakers	5	37.8	.394	**.864**	6.0	2.2	9.0
1965	L.A. Lakers	11	35.9	.409	.716	8.1	**2.6**	15.0
1966	L.A. Lakers	**14**	28.4	**.460**	.791	7.1	1.9	11.9
1968	San Francisco	10	**38.5**	.396	.728	**9.9**	1.7	**20.3**
1969	San Francisco	6	35.8	.378	.774	8.5	2.5	18.2
Career		93	34.3	.405	.751	8.4	2.1	14.5

== See also ==
- List of select Jewish basketball players
