= 2001 NBA All-Star Game =

Exhibition basketball game

	1	2	3	4	Total
East	17	33	20	41	111
West	30	31	28	21	110
- Date: February 11, 2001
- Arena: MCI Center
- City: Washington, D.C.
- MVP: Allen Iverson
- National anthem: Deborah Cox (Canada); Jessica Simpson (USA)
- Halftime show: Harry Connick, Jr. saluting 50 years of All-Star Game MVPs
- Attendance: 20,674
- Network: NBC
- Announcers: Marv Albert; Doug Collins

NBA All-Star Game
< 2000	2002 >

The 2001 NBA All-Star Game was an exhibition basketball game which was played on February 11, 2001, at the MCI Center in Washington, D.C., home of the Washington Wizards. This game was the 50th edition of the North American National Basketball Association (NBA) All-Star Game and was played during the 2000–01 NBA season.

Allen Iverson was named the game's Most Valuable Player after he rallied the East to garner an improbable 111–110 comeback victory over the West. The East trailed 95–74 with nine minutes left after the West dominated the first 39 minutes behind its superior size. Iverson sparked the comeback scoring 15 of his 25 points in the final nine minutes of the game. Stephon Marbury also helped the East by hitting two three-pointers in the final 53 seconds, including one with 28 seconds left, which proved to be the game-winner.

Kobe Bryant scored the most points for the West squad (19 points), which led by as much as twenty-one points before the team squandered the lead. Bryant, the NBA's leading scorer at the time, could have taken the last shot; instead, his hesitation before passing to an open Tim Duncan resulted in a last-second miss.

This was the third NBA All-Star Game hosted by the Washington Wizards franchise after doing so in 1969 at the Baltimore Civic Center as the Baltimore Bullets and 1980 at the Capital Centre as the Washington Bullets.

== All-Star Game ==
=== Coaches ===
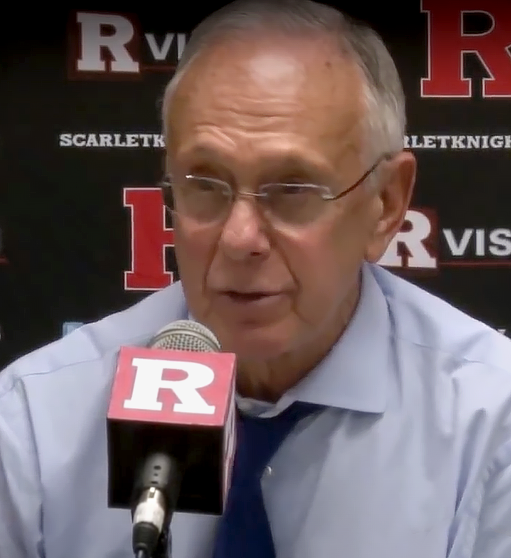
Larry Brown, of the 76ers, was selected as the Eastern Conference head coach.

The coach for the Western Conference team was Sacramento Kings head coach Rick Adelman. The coach for the Eastern Conference team was Philadelphia 76ers head coach Larry Brown. Both the Kings and 76ers led their respective conferences by the end of January.

=== Players ===
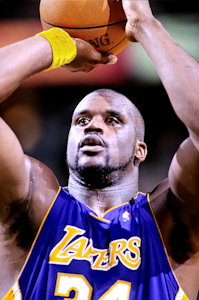
Shaquille O'Neal received the most votes for the West, for the second consecutive year.

The rosters for the All-Star Game were chosen in two ways. The starters were chosen via a fan ballot. Two guards, two forwards and one center who received the highest vote were named the All-Star starters. The reserves were chosen by votes among the NBA head coaches in their respective conferences. The coaches were not permitted to vote for their own players. The reserves consist of two guards, two forwards, one center and two players regardless of position. If a player is unable to participate due to injury, the commissioner will select a replacement.

For the second consecutive year, Vince Carter of the Toronto Raptors was the lead vote-getter with 1,717,687. He was closely followed by Allen Iverson, who earned his second consecutive All-Star appearances. Tracy McGrady, Grant Hill, and Alonzo Mourning completed the Eastern Conference starting position. This was the first All-Star appearance by McGrady. Iverson, Hill, and Mourning were all starters the previous year. The Eastern Conference reserves included two first-time selections, Theo Ratliff and Stephon Marbury. The other reserves were Dikembe Mutombo, Ray Allen, Allan Houston, Glenn Robinson, Latrell Sprewell, and Jerry Stackhouse. Because of injuries to Mourning and Hill, Antonio Davis and Anthony Mason were selected as replacements.

The Western Conference's leading vote-getter was Shaquille O'Neal, who earned his eight consecutive All-Star Game selection with 1,541,298 votes. Jason Kidd, Kobe Bryant, Chris Webber, and Tim Duncan completed the Western Conference starting positions. Kidd, Bryant, Duncan, and O'Neal were starters for the previous year's Western Conference team, while Webber was a reserve. The Western Conference reserves include two first-time selections, Vlade Divac and Antonio McDyess. The team was rounded out by Gary Payton, Michael Finley, Rasheed Wallace, Karl Malone, and David Robinson. Because of an injury to O'Neal, Kevin Garnett, who had started the previous year, was selected as his replacement.

=== Roster ===
Eastern Conference All-Stars
Pos	Player	Team	No. of selections	Votes
Starters
G	Allen Iverson	Philadelphia 76ers	2nd	1,508,142
G	Tracy McGrady	Orlando Magic	1st	827,122
F	Vince Carter	Toronto Raptors	2nd	1,717,687
F	Grant Hill^{INJ}	Orlando Magic	6th	904,885
C	Alonzo Mourning^{INJ}	Miami Heat	6th	917,866
Reserves
G	Ray Allen	Milwaukee Bucks	2nd	409,654
G	Allan Houston	New York Knicks	2nd	476,380
G	Stephon Marbury	New Jersey Nets	1st	512,645
G	Jerry Stackhouse	Detroit Pistons	2nd	459,575
F	Anthony Mason^{1}	Miami Heat	1st	322,696
F	Glenn Robinson	Milwaukee Bucks	2nd	—
F	Latrell Sprewell^{REP}	New York Knicks	4th	817,855
C	Antonio Davis^{REP} ^{1}	Toronto Raptors	1st	220,917
C	Dikembe Mutombo^{REP}	Atlanta Hawks	7th	627,148
C	Theo Ratliff^{INJ}	Philadelphia 76ers	1st	637,585
Head coach: Larry Brown (Philadelphia 76ers)

Western Conference All-Stars
Pos	Player	Team	No. of selections	Votes
Starters
G	Jason Kidd	Phoenix Suns	4th	1,062,837
G	Kobe Bryant	Los Angeles Lakers	3rd	1,433,747
F	Chris Webber	Sacramento Kings	3rd	1,306,243
F	Tim Duncan	San Antonio Spurs	3rd	1,096,522
C	Shaquille O'Neal^{INJ}	Los Angeles Lakers	8th	1,541,298
Reserves
G	Michael Finley	Dallas Mavericks	2nd	279,250
G	Gary Payton	Seattle SuperSonics	7th	732,671
F	Kevin Garnett^{1}	Minnesota Timberwolves	4th	1,003,336
F	Karl Malone	Utah Jazz	13th	479,624
F	Antonio McDyess	Denver Nuggets	1st	—
F	Rasheed Wallace	Portland Trail Blazers	2nd	510,543
C	David Robinson	San Antonio Spurs	10th	716,228
C	Vlade Divac^{REP}	Sacramento Kings	1st	715,687
Head coach: Rick Adelman (Sacramento Kings)

^INJ Grant Hill, Alonzo Mourning, Theo Ratliff, and Shaquille O'Neal were unable to participate due to injury.
^REP Latrell Sprewell, Dikembe Mutombo, Antonio Davis, and Vlade Divac were named as Hill, Mourning, Ratliff, and O'Neal's replacements respectively.
^1 Anthony Mason, Davis, and Kevin Garnett were named as starters, replacing Hill, Mourning, and O'Neal respectively.

=== Game ===
NBC

February 11, 2001

Western Conference 110, Eastern Conference 111
Scoring by quarter: 30–17, 31–33, 28–20, 21–41
Pts: Kobe Bryant 19; Rebs: Tim Duncan 14; Asts: Kobe Bryant 7	Pts: Allen Iverson 25; Rebs: Dikembe Mutombo 22; Asts: Allen Iverson 5

MCI Center, Washington, D.C.
Attendance: 18,325
Referees:

== All-Star Weekend ==
=== Rising Stars Challenge ===
The Rising Stars Challenge featured the best first-year players ('Rookies') against the best second-year players ('Sophomores'). Kevin Loughery and Elvin Hayes served as head coaches for the rookies and sophomores respectively.

Rookies
Pos.	Player	Team
G	Mateen Cleaves	Detroit Pistons
F/G	Stephen Jackson	New Jersey Nets
F	Kenyon Martin	New Jersey Nets
G	Khalid El-Amin	Chicago Bulls
F	Quentin Richardson	Los Angeles Clippers
G/F	Morris Peterson	Toronto Raptors
C	Marc Jackson	Golden State Warriors
F	Darius Miles	Los Angeles Clippers
G/F	Mike Miller	Orlando Magic
Head coach: Kevin Loughery
Assistant coach: Jack Marin

Sophomores
Pos.	Player	Team
G	Andre Miller	Cleveland Cavaliers
F/C	Elton Brand	Chicago Bulls
F	Lamar Odom	Los Angeles Clippers
G	Steve Francis	Houston Rockets
F	Shawn Marion	Phoenix Suns
G	Richard Hamilton	Washington Wizards
G	Jason Terry	Atlanta Hawks
F	Wally Szczerbiak	Minnesota Timberwolves
G	Baron Davis	Charlotte Hornets
Head coach: Elvin Hayes
Assistant coach: Phil Chenier

=== Slam Dunk Contest ===
Desmond Mason won the Dunk Contest, defeating DeShawn Stevenson and Baron Davis in the final round; Stromile Swift, Jonathan Bender, and Corey Maggette were eliminated before the final round.

Contestants
Pos.	Player	Team	Height	Weight	Pct
G/F	Desmond Mason	Seattle SuperSonics	6–5	222	
G/F	DeShawn Stevenson	Utah Jazz	6-5	218	
G	Baron Davis	Charlotte Hornets	6–3	212	
F/C	Stromile Swift	Vancouver Grizzlies	6–10	220	
F	Jonathan Bender	Indiana Pacers	7-0	230	
G/F	Corey Maggette	L.A. Clippers	6–6	225	

=== Three-Point Contest ===
Contestants
Pos.	Player	Team	Height	Weight	First round	Final round
G	Ray Allen	Milwaukee Bucks	6–5	205	20	19
F	Peja Stojaković	Sacramento Kings	6–10	229	19	17
F	Dirk Nowitzki	Dallas Mavericks	7–0	245	17	10
F	Pat Garrity	Orlando Magic	6–9	238	15	—
G	Allan Houston	New York Knicks	6–6	205	11	—
F	Rashard Lewis	Seattle SuperSonics	6–10	230	12	—
G	Steve Nash	Dallas Mavericks	6–3	178	14	—
F	Bryon Russell	Utah Jazz	6–7	225	10	—
