= 1968 NBA All-Star Game =

Exhibition basketball game

	1	2	3	4	Total
West	25	34	32	33	124
East	37	27	37	43	144
- Date: January 23, 1968
- Arena: Madison Square Garden (III) (Note: The event was originally scheduled to be held at the unfinished Madison Square Garden (IV).)
- City: New York City
- MVP: Hal Greer
- Attendance: 18,422
- Network: ABC
- Announcers: Chris Schenkel and Jack Twyman

NBA All-Star Game
< 1967	1969 >

The 18th Annual NBA All-Star Game was an exhibition basketball game which was played on January 23, 1968, at the Madison Square Garden (MSG III) in New York City, home of the New York Knicks. This was the third time that New York City had hosted the All-Star Game; the city had previously hosted the event in 1954 and 1955. The game was originally intended to be held at the newer Madison Square Garden (MSG IV), but construction delays necessitated it to be moved to the older MSG, making it the last NBA All-Star Game held there prior to its closure in the following month. This was the first NBA All-Star Game to be relocated from its originally planned venue.

The game was officiated by Mendy Rudolph and Don Murphy. It had a recorded attendance of 18,422. The East won the game 144–124. Hal Greer was named the Most Valuable Player (MVP).

== Coaches ==
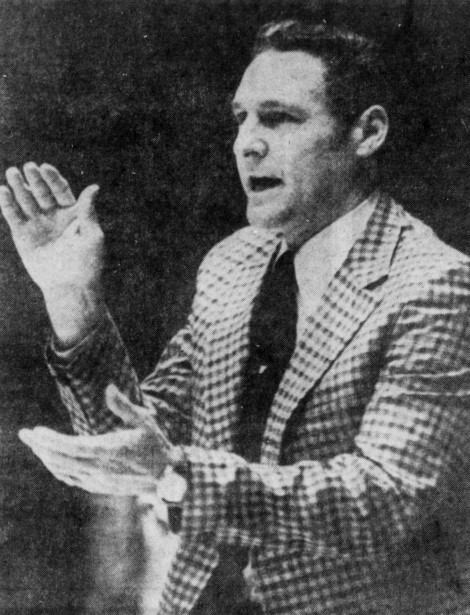
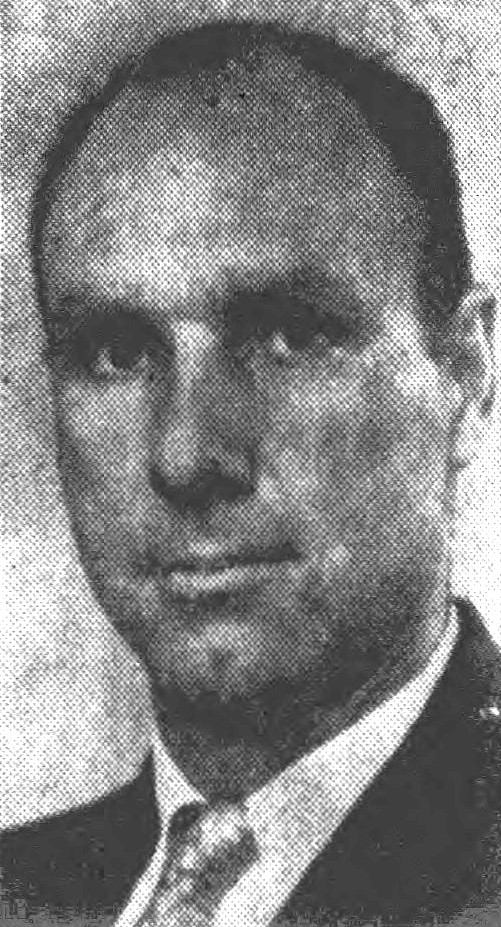
Bill Sharman and Alex Hannum were selected as the West and East head coach, respectively.

San Francisco Warriors head coach Bill Sharman was named as coach for the Western All-Stars, while Philadelphia 76ers head coach Alex Hannum was named as coach for the Eastern All-Stars. They were selected because both the Warriors and 76ers made the previous year's finals.

== Teams ==
=== Western Division ===
Player, Team	MIN	FGM	FGA	FTM	FTA	REB	AST	PF	PTS
Jerry West, LAL	32	7	17	3	4	6	6	4	17
Zelmo Beaty, STL	30	2	11	2	2	10	1	4	6
Elgin Baylor, LAL	27	8	13	6	7	6	1	5	22
Lenny Wilkens, STL	22	4	10	6	8	3	3	1	14
Bill Bridges, STL	21	7	9	1	4	7	1	4	15
Walt Hazzard, SEA	20	4	12	1	1	3	3	3	9
Rudy LaRusso, SFW	19	3	8	0	2	7	0	0	6
Bob Boozer, CHI	19	2	5	0	0	5	0	0	4
Clyde Lee, SFW	18	2	8	2	4	11	2	3	6
Archie Clark, LAL	15	5	8	7	7	0	3	2	17
Don Kojis, SDR	10	2	5	0	0	2	1	0	4
Jim King, SFW	7	1	4	2	3	1	2	3	4
Nate Thurmond, SFW (injured)
Totals	240	47	110	30	42	61	23	29	124

=== Eastern Division ===
Player, Team	MIN	FGM	FGA	FTM	FTA	REB	AST	PF	PTS
Willis Reed, NYK	25	7	14	2	3	8	1	4	16
Wilt Chamberlain, PHI	25	3	4	1	4	7	6	2	7
Bill Russell, BOS	23	2	4	0	0	9	8	5	4
John Havlicek, BOS	22	9	15	8	11	5	4	0	26
Oscar Robertson, CIN	22	7	9	4	7	1	5	2	18
Dick Barnett, NYK	22	7	12	1	2	1	0	2	15
Jerry Lucas, CIN	21	6	9	4	4	5	4	3	16
Dave Bing, DET	20	4	7	1	1	2	4	3	9
Hal Greer, PHI	17	8	8	5	7	3	3	2	21
Gus Johnson, BAL	16	3	9	1	2	6	1	2	7
Sam Jones, BOS	15	2	5	1	1	2	4	1	5
Dave DeBusschere, DET	12	0	3	0	0	4	0	1	0
Totals	240	58	99	28	42	53	40	27	144

== Score by periods ==
Score by periods:	1	2	3	4	Final
West	25	34	32	33	124
East	37	27	37	43	144
