= 2006 NBA All-Star Game =

Exhibition basketball game

| | 1 | 2 | 3 | 4 | Total |
|---|---|---|---|---|---|
| East | 28 | 25 | 41 | 28 | 122 |
| West | 28 | 42 | 27 | 23 | 120 |
- Date: February 19, 2006
- Arena: Toyota Center
- City: Houston
- MVP: LeBron James
- National anthem: Jann Arden (CAN); Destiny's Child (USA)
- Halftime show: John Legend and Carrie Underwood
- Attendance: 18,652
- Network: TNT; ESPN Radio
- Announcers: Marv Albert, Doug Collins, and Steve Kerr; Kevin Harlan, Reggie Miller, Charles Barkley, Kenny Smith and Magic Johnson (All-Star Saturday Night); Dick Stockton, John Thompson and Reggie Miller (Rookie Challenge); Jim Durham and Jack Ramsay

NBA All-Star Game
| < 2005 | 2007 > |

The 2006 NBA All-Star Game was an exhibition basketball game which was played on Sunday, February 19, 2006, at the Toyota Center in Houston, home of the Houston Rockets. The game was the 55th annual All-Star game. This was the third time that Houston had hosted the All-Star Game; the city had previously hosted the event in 1989 at the Astrodome. It was also the third All-Star Game to be hosted by the Rockets franchise, with the first in 1971, when they were known as the San Diego Rockets.

The theme song was by Houston native Chamillionaire who made a new version of his hit "Turn It Up." Trailing by 21 points, the East rode the hot shooting of LeBron James and the teamwork of the four All-Stars from the Detroit Pistons to a 122–120 victory over the West. The 21-year-old James, who scored 29 points and grabbed six rebounds, became the youngest player to win MVP. With the score tied, Dwyane Wade, who finished with 20 points, hit the game-winning layup with 16 seconds left. Tracy McGrady of the Houston Rockets led all players with a game-high 36 points.

== Players ==
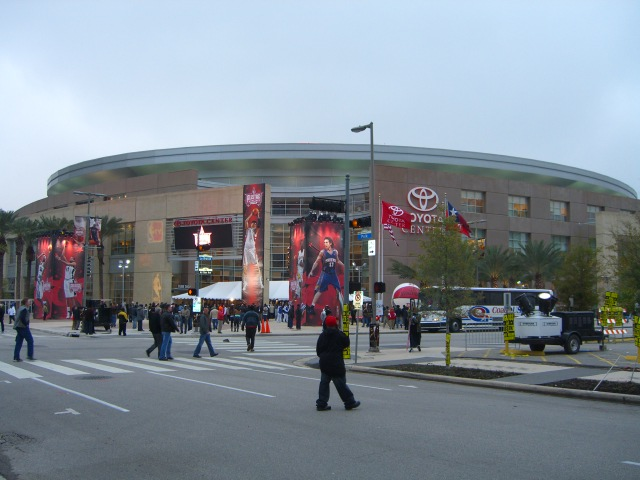
Spectators make their way into Toyota Center through the LaBranch street entrance prior to the tip-off of the 55th NBA All-Star game on Sunday, Feb. 19, 2006.

Eastern Conference All-Stars
| Pos. | Player | Team | # of Selections |
Starters
| G | Allen Iverson | Philadelphia 76ers | 7th |
| G | Dwyane Wade | Miami Heat | 2nd |
| F | LeBron James | Cleveland Cavaliers | 2nd |
| F | Jermaine O'Neal^{INJ} | Indiana Pacers | 5th |
| C | Shaquille O'Neal | Miami Heat | 13th |
Reserves
| G | Gilbert Arenas^{REP} | Washington Wizards | 2nd |
| G | Chauncey Billups | Detroit Pistons | 1st |
| G | Vince Carter^{1} | New Jersey Nets | 7th |
| G | Richard Hamilton | Detroit Pistons | 1st |
| F | Chris Bosh | Toronto Raptors | 1st |
| F | Paul Pierce | Boston Celtics | 5th |
| F | Rasheed Wallace | Detroit Pistons | 3rd |
| C | Ben Wallace | Detroit Pistons | 4th |

Western Conference All-Stars
| Pos. | Player | Team | # of Selections |
Starters
| G | Steve Nash | Phoenix Suns | 4th |
| G | Kobe Bryant | Los Angeles Lakers | 8th |
| F | Tracy McGrady | Houston Rockets | 6th |
| F | Tim Duncan | San Antonio Spurs | 8th |
| C | Yao Ming | Houston Rockets | 4th |
Reserves
| G | Ray Allen | Seattle SuperSonics | 6th |
| G | Tony Parker | San Antonio Spurs | 1st |
| F | Elton Brand | Los Angeles Clippers | 2nd |
| F | Kevin Garnett | Minnesota Timberwolves | 9th |
| C | Pau Gasol | Memphis Grizzlies | 1st |
| F | Shawn Marion | Phoenix Suns | 3rd |
| F | Dirk Nowitzki | Dallas Mavericks | 5th |

^INJ Jermaine O'Neal was unable to participate due to injury.
^REP Gilbert Arenas was named as O'Neal's replacement. ^1 Vince Carter was named as starter, replacing O'Neal.

== Coaches ==
The Eastern Conference team was coached by Flip Saunders of the East leader Detroit Pistons, along with Sidney Lowe, Ron Harper and Don Zierden as assistant coaches. Ted Arzonico of the Orlando Magic was the athletic trainer.

The Western Conference team was coached by Avery Johnson of the West leader Dallas Mavericks. Del Harris, Rolando Blackman and Joe Prunty served as assistant coaches, while Keith Jones of the Houston Rockets was the athletic trainer. Although the San Antonio Spurs have also overtook Dallas for the best record in the West several times before the game, their head coach, Gregg Popovich, was ineligible to coach in the All-Star Game because he had coached in the 2005 game and league rules prohibit a coach from coaching in consecutive All-Star Games.

== Rookie Challenge ==
The T-Mobile Rookie challenge was played on Friday, February 17, 2006, with the Sophomores beating the Rookies 106–96. Andre Iguodala was named MVP with a game-high 30 points.

Rookies
| Pos. | Player | Team |
|---|---|---|
| PF/C | Andrew Bogut | Milwaukee Bucks |
| SG | Luther Head | Houston Rockets |
| PF/C | Channing Frye | New York Knicks |
| SF | Danny Granger | Indiana Pacers |
| PG | Šarūnas Jasikevičius | Indiana Pacers |
| PG | Chris Paul | New Orleans/Oklahoma City Hornets |
| PG | Nate Robinson | New York Knicks |
| SF | Charlie Villanueva | Toronto Raptors |
| PG | Deron Williams | Utah Jazz |

Sophomores
| Pos. | Player | Team |
|---|---|---|
| SF/SG | Luol Deng | Chicago Bulls |
| PG | T. J. Ford | Milwaukee Bucks |
| SG | Ben Gordon | Chicago Bulls |
| PG | Devin Harris | Dallas Mavericks |
| PF/C | Dwight Howard | Orlando Magic |
| SG | Andre Iguodala | Philadelphia 76ers |
| C | Nenad Krstić | New Jersey Nets |
| PG | Jameer Nelson* | Orlando Magic |
| SF | Andrés Nocioni | Chicago Bulls |
| PF/C | Emeka Okafor* | Charlotte Bobcats |
| PG | Delonte West | Boston Celtics |

* Did not participate due to injury. Delonte West replaced Jameer Nelson (sprained right foot).

=== Coaches ===
The Rooks were coached by Sidney Lowe of the Detroit Pistons, along with Elvin Hayes as the assistant coach.

The Sophomores were coached by Del Harris of the Dallas Mavericks, along with Moses Malone as the assistant coach.

== Three-Point Shootout ==
Dirk Nowitzki won with a score of 18, beating Gilbert Arenas and Ray Allen in the final round.

Contestants
| Pos. | Player | Team |
|---|---|---|
| SG | Ray Allen | Seattle SuperSonics |
| PG | Gilbert Arenas | Washington Wizards |
| SG | Raja Bell* | Phoenix Suns |
| PG | Chauncey Billups | Detroit Pistons |
| PF | Dirk Nowitzki | Dallas Mavericks |
| SF/SG | Quentin Richardson | New York Knicks |
| PG | Jason Terry | Dallas Mavericks |

* Did not participate due to a family illness. Gilbert Arenas replaced Raja Bell.

== Slam Dunk Contest ==
Nate Robinson won, beating Andre Iguodala in a dunk-off after the first ever tie in a Slam Dunk Contest. Robinson's win was highly questioned as he had missed several dunks and many speculate that Robinson was only awarded the title because of his small stature.

Contestants
| Pos. | Player | Team | Height | Weight |
|---|---|---|---|---|
| SG | Andre Iguodala | Philadelphia 76ers | 6'6" | 207 lb |
| PG | Nate Robinson | New York Knicks | 5'9" | 180 lb |
| SF | Josh Smith | Atlanta Hawks | 6'9" | 225 lb |
| PF | Hakim Warrick | Memphis Grizzlies | 6'9" | 219 lb |

== Skills Challenge ==
Dwyane Wade won, beating LeBron James in the final round. Dwyane Wade won with a time of 26.1 seconds.

Contestants
| Pos. | Player | Team |
|---|---|---|
| SF | LeBron James | Cleveland Cavaliers |
| PG | Steve Nash | Phoenix Suns |
| PG | Chris Paul | New Orleans/Oklahoma City Hornets |
| SG | Dwyane Wade | Miami Heat |

== Shooting Stars Competition ==
The San Antonio team won the competition with a time of 25.1 seconds.

Contestants
Houston
| Tracy McGrady | Houston Rockets |
| Sheryl Swoopes | Houston Comets |
| Clyde Drexler | Houston Rockets (Retired) |
Los Angeles
| Kobe Bryant | Los Angeles Lakers |
| Lisa Leslie | Los Angeles Sparks |
| Magic Johnson | Los Angeles Lakers (Retired) |
Phoenix
| Shawn Marion | Phoenix Suns |
| Kelly Miller | Phoenix Mercury |
| Dan Majerle | Phoenix Suns (Retired) |
San Antonio
| Tony Parker | San Antonio Spurs |
| Kendra Wecker | San Antonio Silver Stars |
| Steve Kerr | San Antonio Spurs (Retired) |
