= 1967 NBA All-Star Game =

Exhibition basketball game

	1	2	3	4	Total
West	39	38	27	31	135
East	33	34	28	25	120
- Date: January 10, 1967
- Arena: Cow Palace
- City: Daly City
- MVP: Rick Barry, San Francisco Warriors
- Attendance: 13,972
- Network: SNI
- Announcers: Chick Hearn

NBA All-Star Game
< 1966	1968 >

The 17th Annual NBA All-Star Game was an exhibition basketball game played on January 10, 1967, during the 1966–67 NBA season, at the Cow Palace in Daly City, California, the home of the San Francisco Warriors. This was the only NBA All-Star Game to be held in Daly City, as the franchise later relocated to Oakland, California, and was rebranded as the Golden State Warriors in 1971. It was also the first to be hosted by the Warriors franchise since 1960, when they were known as the Philadelphia Warriors.

The Western Division All-Stars defeated the heavily favored Eastern Division All-Stars, 135–120, widely acknowledged to be the greatest upset in the history of the event. San Francisco Warriors forward Rick Barry was selected the Most Valuable Player on the strength of 38 points on 16-of-27 in the field. He also contributed six rebounds and three assists in 34 minutes.

The game also saw the ejection of Eastern Division head coach Red Auerbach in what would be his final NBA season on the bench. He became the only coach to be ejected in an All-Star Game.

== Coaches ==
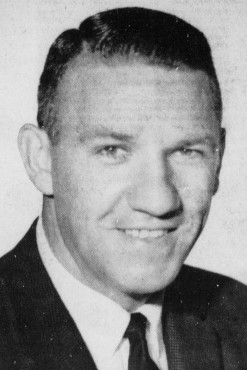
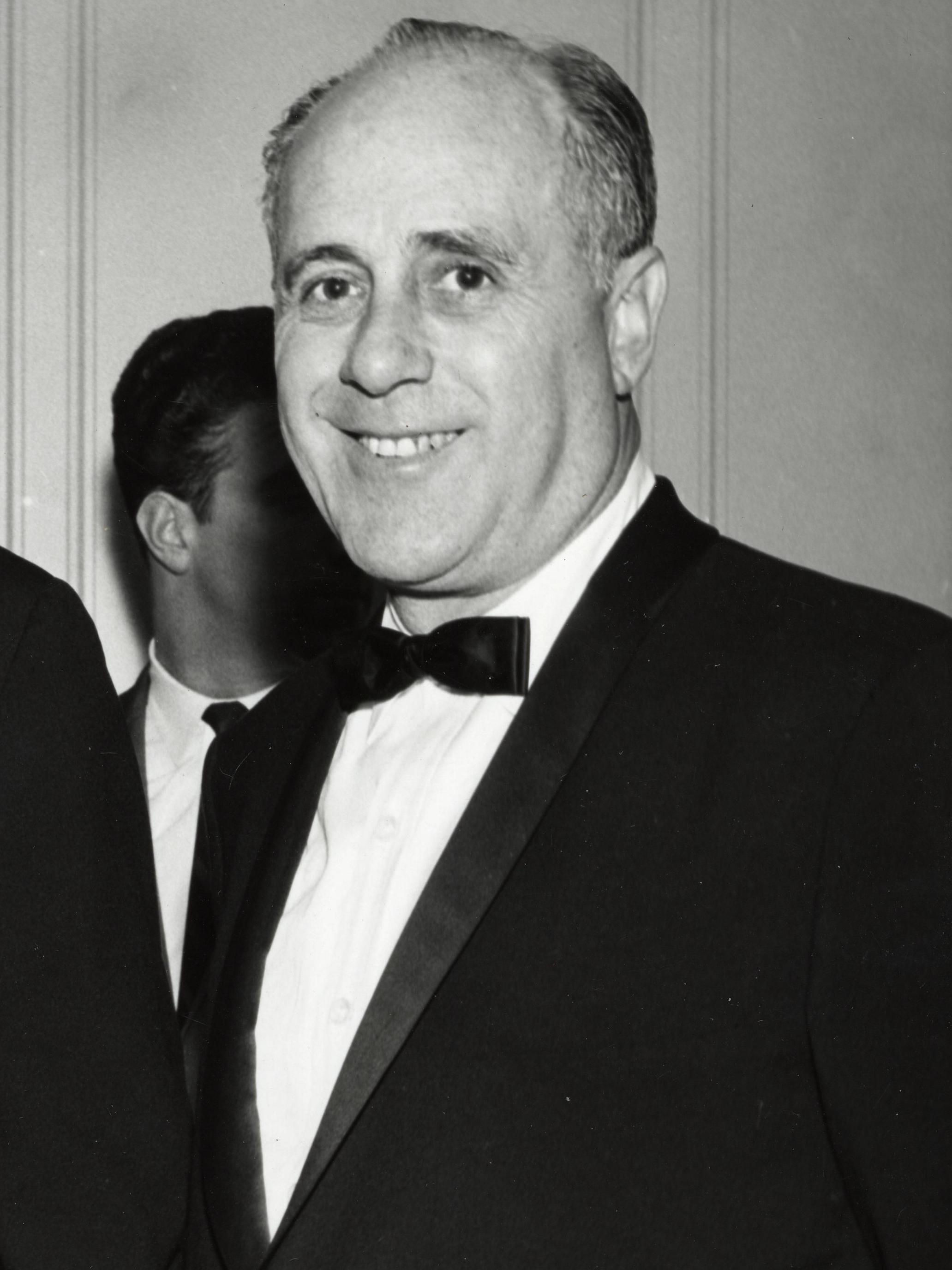
Fred Schaus and Red Auerbach were selected as the West and East head coach, respectively.

Red Auerbach, general manager and previously head coach of the Boston Celtics, was named as the head coach of the Eastern Division All-Stars, while Fred Schaus of the Los Angeles Lakers was named as the head coach of the Western Division All-Stars. Marking the second consecutive year both men coached the game together, they were selected because their respective teams had appeared in the previous year's finals under their leadership. This was also Auerbach's 11th straight and final appearance as an All-Star Game head coach.

== Eastern Division ==
Player, Team	MIN	FGM	FGA	FTM	FTA	REB	AST	PF	PTS
Bailey Howell, BOS	14	1	4	2	2	2	1	1	4
Willis Reed, NY	17	2	6	0	0	9	1	0	4
Wilt Chamberlain, PHI	39	6	7	2	5	22	4	1	14
Oscar Robertson, CIN	34	9	20	8	10	2	5	4	26
Hal Greer, PHI	31	5	16	7	8	4	1	5	17
John Havlicek, BOS	17	7	14	0	0	2	1	1	14
Don Ohl, BAL	22	5	13	7	7	1	2	3	17
Bill Russell, BOS	22	1	2	0	0	5	5	2	2
Chet Walker, PHI	22	6	9	3	4	4	2	2	15
Jerry Lucas, CIN	22	3	5	1	1	7	2	3	7
Totals	240	45	96	30	37	58	24	22	120

== Western Division ==
Player, Team	MIN	FGM	FGA	FTM	FTA	REB	AST	PF	PTS
Rick Barry, SF	34	16	27	6	8	6	3	5	38
Elgin Baylor, LA	20	8	14	4	4	5	5	2	20
Nate Thurmond, SF	42	7	16	2	4	18	0	1	16
Guy Rodgers, CHI	28	0	4	1	1	2	8	3	1
Jerry West, LA	30	6	11	4	4	3	6	3	16
Darrall Imhoff, LA	6	0	7	0	0	7	1	1	0
Jerry Sloan, CHI	22	4	9	0	0	4	4	5	8
Dave DeBusschere, DET	25	11	17	0	0	6	0	1	22
Bill Bridges, STL	17	4	5	0	2	3	3	1	8
Lenny Wilkens, STL	16	2	6	2	3	2	6	2	6
Totals	240	58	116	19	26	56	36	24	135

== Score by periods ==
Score by periods:	1	2	3	4	Final
Eastern Division	33	34	28	25	120
Western Division	39	38	27	31	135

- Officials: Willie Smith and Earl Strom
- Attendance: 13,972
