= 1966 NBA All-Star Game =

Exhibition basketball game

	1	2	3	4	Total
East	33	30	38	36	137
West	18	18	32	26	94
- Date: January 11, 1966
- Arena: Cincinnati Gardens
- City: Cincinnati
- MVP: Adrian Smith
- Attendance: 13,653
- Network: SNI
- Announcers: Harry Caray

NBA All-Star Game
< 1965	1967 >

The 16th Annual NBA All-Star Game was an exhibition basketball game played on January 11, 1966, at Cincinnati Gardens in Cincinnati, home of the Cincinnati Royals (now known as the Sacramento Kings). To date, it is the only NBA All-Star Game held in Cincinnati, as the Royals would relocate to Kansas City and become the Kansas City-Omaha Kings in 1972. This was the second and most recent time the franchise hosted the All-Star Game as it had previously hosted the 1956 game in Rochester, New York, as the Rochester Royals. It was also the first All-Star Game to be hosted in the state of Ohio; subsequent games in the state were hosted in Richfield and Cleveland by the Cleveland Cavaliers, which was formed in 1970.

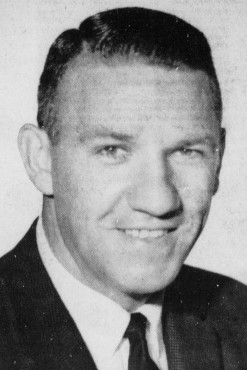
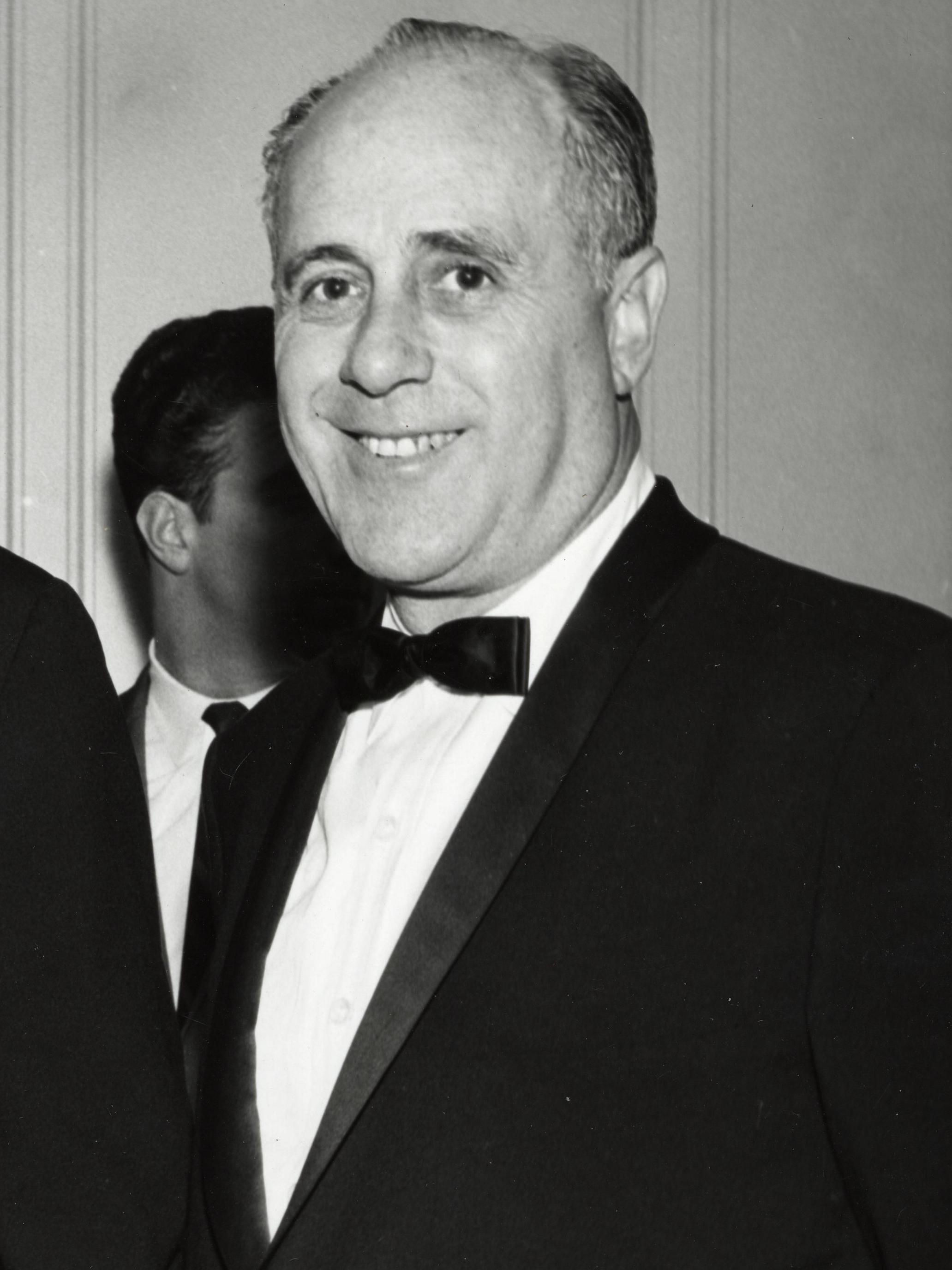
Fred Schaus and Red Auerbach were selected as the West and East head coach, respectively.

The coaches were the Boston Celtics' Red Auerbach for the East and the Los Angeles Lakers' Fred Schaus for the West, as the Lakers and Celtics had made the previous year's finals and led their respective divisions entering the game.

Much of the game would focus around the local team's three named All-Stars. Cincinnati Royals' Oscar Robertson had been named the event's MVP in 1964, and Jerry Lucas had been named MVP in 1965. At game time, the East Division's top three teams, Boston Celtics, Philadelphia 76ers and Cincinnati, had the three best records in the league, with the New York Knicks trailing far behind. This led East coach Red Auerbach to name Cincinnati's Adrian Smith as a reserve and not New York's sharpshooting Dick Barnett, a source of some controversy at the time. The home crowd rallied behind Smith as he emerged as the game's star. It was Smith's only All-Star appearance, and he remains to-date the only one-time NBA All-Star ever named the event's MVP. The East beat the West 137–94. The overmatched West suffered not just from poor shooting, but also from losing key All-Star Jerry West to an eye injury in the first quarter. The game was nationally televised, with an attendance of 13,653.

== Eastern Division ==
Player, Team	MIN	FGM	FGA	FTM	FTA	REB	AST	PF	PTS
Adrian Smith, CIN	26	9	18	6	6	8	3	5	24
Wilt Chamberlain, PHI	25	8	11	5	9	9	3	2	21
John Havlicek, BOS	25	6	16	6	6	6	1	2	18
Oscar Robertson, CIN	25	6	12	5	6	10	8	0	17
Chet Walker, PHI	25	3	10	2	3	6	4	2	8
Willis Reed, NYK	23	7	11	2	2	8	1	3	16
Jerry Lucas, CIN	23	4	11	2	2	19	0	2	10
Hal Greer, PHI	23	4	13	1	1	5	1	4	9
Bill Russell, BOS	23	1	6	0	0	10	2	2	2
Sam Jones, BOS	22	5	11	2	2	2	5	0	12
Totals	240	53	119	31	37	83	28	22	137

== Western Division ==
Player, Team	MIN	FGM	FGA	FTM	FTA	REB	AST	PF	PTS
Guy Rodgers, SFW	34	4	11	0	0	7	11	4	8
Nate Thurmond, SFW	33	3	16	1	3	16	1	1	7
Eddie Miles, DET	28	8	16	1	5	1	0	1	17
Bailey Howell, BAL	26	3	11	1	2	2	2	4	7
Zelmo Beaty, STL	24	0	11	10	13	18	1	2	10
Don Ohl, BAL	23	7	16	2	3	4	2	2	16
Rudy LaRusso, LAL	22	4	10	3	7	3	2	2	11
Dave DeBusschere, DET	22	1	14	2	2	6	1	1	4
Rick Barry, SFW	17	4	10	2	4	2	2	6	10
Jerry West, LAL	11	1	5	2	2	1	0	2	4
Totals	240	35	120	24	41	60	22	25	94

== Score by periods ==
Score by periods:	1	2	3	4	Final
East	33	30	38	36	137
West	18	18	32	26	94

- Halftime— East, 63–36
- Third Quarter— East, 101–68
- Officials: Norm Drucker and John Vanak
- Attendance: 13,653.
