= 1965 NBA All-Star Game =

Exhibition basketball game

	1	2	3	4	Total
West	27	34	30	32	123
East	36	39	32	17	124
- Date: January 13, 1965
- Arena: St. Louis Arena
- City: St. Louis
- MVP: Jerry Lucas
- Attendance: 16,713
- Network: SNI
- Announcers: Harry Caray and Bill Sharman

NBA All-Star Game
< 1964	1966 >

The 15th Annual NBA All-Star Game was an exhibition basketball game played on January 13, 1965, at St. Louis Arena in St. Louis, Missouri, the home of the St. Louis Hawks. This was the third time the All-Star game was held in St. Louis, after hosting it in 1958 and in 1962. It remains the last All-Star Game held in St. Louis to date, as the Hawks would relocate to Atlanta in 1968.

The coaches were the Boston Celtics' Red Auerbach for the East, and the San Francisco Warriors' Alex Hannum for the West, as both teams had met in the previous year's finals. The East narrowly won the game 124–123. Jerry Lucas of the Cincinnati Royals was named the Most Valuable Player, after logging 25 points and 10 rebounds for the East.

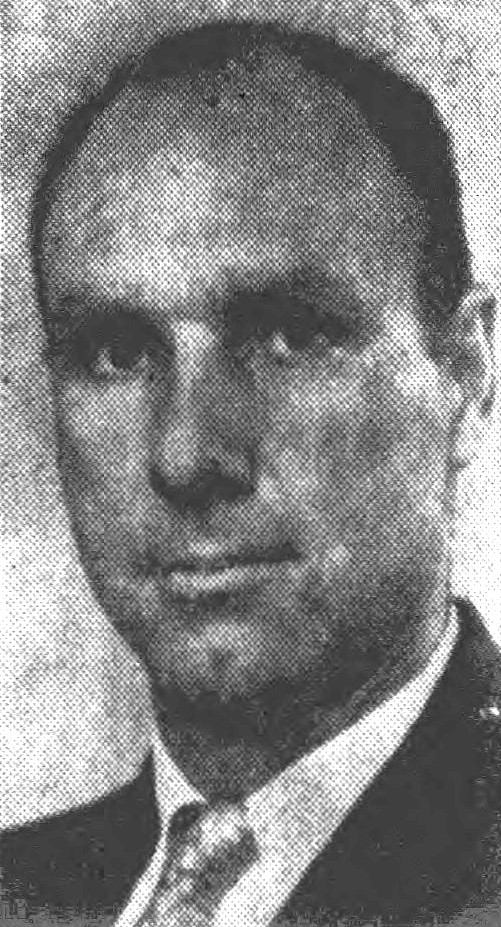
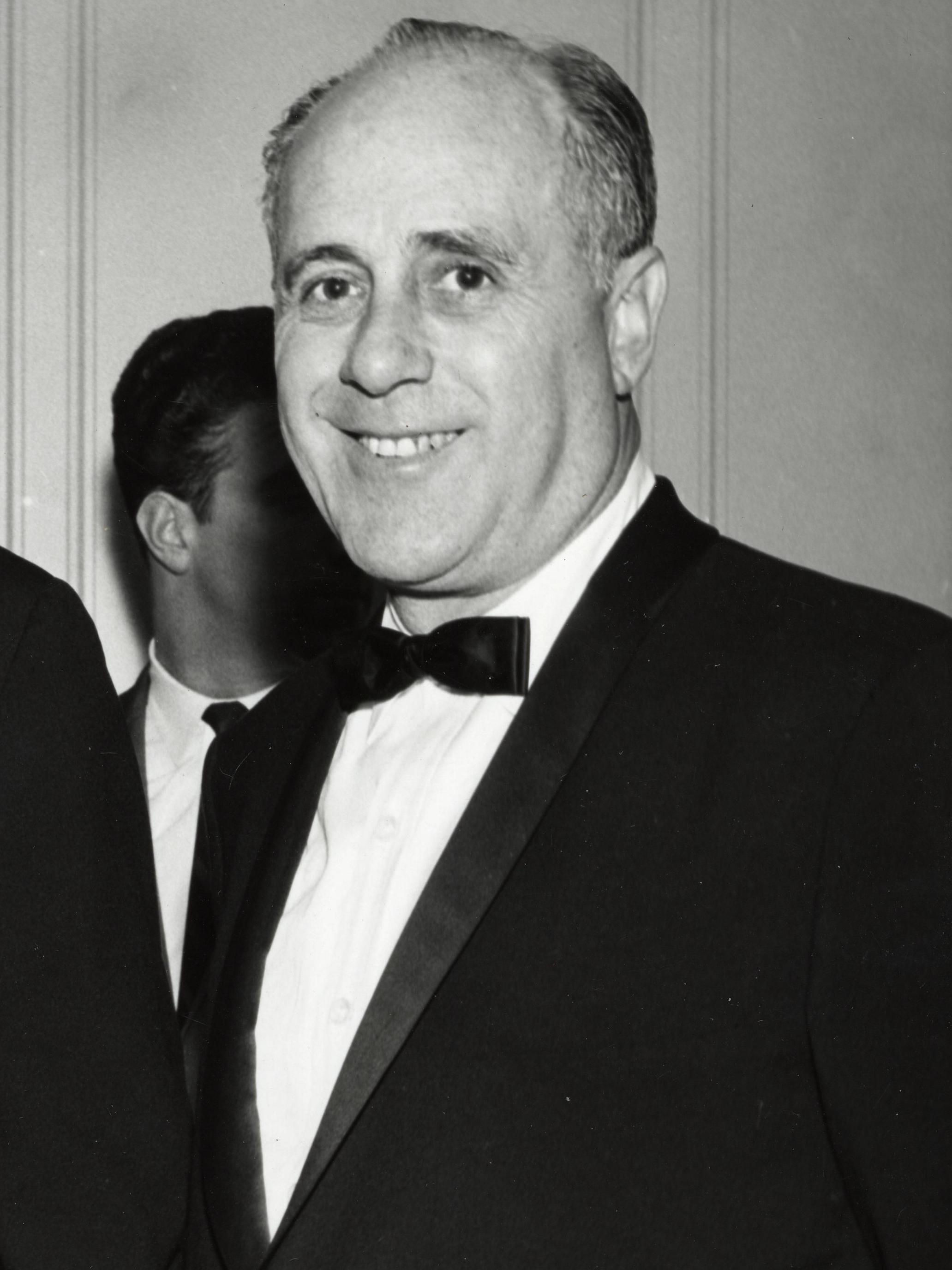
Alex Hannum and Red Auerbach were selected as the West and East head coach, respectively.

== Western Division ==
Player, Team	MIN	FGM	FGA	FTM	FTA	REB	AST	PF	PTS
Jerry West, LAL	40	8	16	4	6	5	6	2	20
Bob Pettit, STL	34	5	14	3	5	12	0	4	13
Wilt Chamberlain, SFW	31	9	15	2	8	16	1	4	20
Elgin Baylor, LAL	27	5	13	8	8	7	0	4	18
Gus Johnson, BAL	25	7	13	11	13	8	2	2	25
Terry Dischinger, DET	24	2	8	1	2	5	1	4	5
Lenny Wilkens, STL	20	2	6	4	4	3	3	3	8
Walt Bellamy, BAL	17	4	5	4	4	5	1	3	12
Don Ohl, BAL	12	0	1	2	2	2	1	1	2
Nate Thurmond, SFW	10	0	2	0	0	3	0	1	0
Totals	240	42	93	39	52	66	15	28	123

== Eastern Division ==
Player, Team	MIN	FGM	FGA	FTM	FTA	REB	AST	PF	PTS
Oscar Robertson, CIN	40	8	18	12	13	6	8	5	28
Jerry Lucas, CIN	35	12	19	1	1	10	1	2	25
Bill Russell, BOS	33	7	12	3	9	13	5	6	17
Willis Reed, NYK	25	3	11	1	2	5	1	2	7
Sam Jones, BOS	24	2	12	2	2	5	3	2	6
Hal Greer, PHI	21	5	11	3	4	4	1	2	13
Wayne Embry, CIN	19	5	10	1	1	4	0	5	11
Johnny Green, NYK	17	3	4	2	3	0	0	6	8
Luke Jackson, PHI	15	2	5	1	2	1	1	4	5
Larry Costello, PHI	11	2	7	0	0	1	2	2	4
Tom Heinsohn, BOS (injured)
Totals	240	49	109	26	37	49	22	36	124

== Score by periods ==
Score by periods:	1	2	3	4	Final
West	27	34	30	32	123
East	36	39	32	17	124

- Halftime— East, 75–61
- Third Quarter— East, 107–91
- Officials: Mendy Rudolph and Joe Gushue
- Attendance: 16,713.
