= Shelley Smith (sports reporter) =

American sports reporter (born 1958)

Shelley Smith (born 1958) is an American sports correspondent, who is currently a correspondent for ESPN's SportsCenter. Smith joined ESPN in January 1997 after working part-time as a reporter for the network since 1993.

A journalist and author of two books, she was a writer/reporter for Sports Illustrated (1989–1997), Pacific Stars and Stripes in Tokyo, Japan (1982–84) and The San Francisco Examiner (1984–1987) where she won a William Randolph Hearst Award in 1986 for her series on Title IX in the Bay Area. Smith has also worked for the Associated Press.

Smith is the author of two books: "Just Give Me the Damn Ball!" written with then New York Jets wide receiver Keyshawn Johnson following the 1996 NFL season and "Games Girls Play: Lessons to Guiding and Understanding Young Female Athletes," written with sports psychologist Caroline Silby, was released 2000.

Smith is the co-founder of the Magic Johnson Foundation newsletter, serves on various committees for The Boys and Girls Club of San Pedro and is a volunteer writer for many charity organizations, including the Serra Project, which provides homes for AIDS victims.

Smith attended the University of Nebraska–Lincoln from 1976 to 1981, majoring in journalism and political science. Smith has one child, a daughter who attended the University of Oregon and captained the women's soccer team, earning second team all-PAC-10 in 2007.

Smith announced via Twitter that she was diagnosed with breast cancer in October 2014. After extensive chemotherapy, she announced that she was "basically cancer free" and returned to ESPN in April 2015. On May 14, 2017, she suffered a stroke in the Warriors' locker room after Game 1 of the NBA Western Conference Finals. She subsequently reported on her progress via her Twitter account.
