= 1969 NBA All-Star Game =

Exhibition basketball game

	1	2	3	4	Total
East	35	25	26	37	123
West	19	34	30	29	112
- Date: January 14, 1969
- Arena: Baltimore Civic Center
- City: Baltimore
- MVP: Oscar Robertson
- Attendance: 12,348
- Network: ABC
- Announcers: Chris Schenkel and Jack Twyman

NBA All-Star Game
< 1968	1970 >

The NBA 19th Annual All Star Game was an exhibition basketball game which was played on January 14, 1969, at the Baltimore Civic Center in Baltimore, Maryland, the home of the Baltimore Bullets. This was the first NBA All-Star Game hosted by the Bullets (now Washington Wizards) franchise and the only one held in Baltimore, as the franchise would relocate to the Washington metropolitan area in 1973.

The East won the game 123–112. Oscar Robertson was named the Most Valuable Player with a game-high 24 points.

== Coaches ==
Gene Shue, head coach of the Eastern Division leader Baltimore Bullets, qualified as the head coach of Eastern All-Stars. Although the Los Angeles Lakers had the best record in the Western Division, their head coach, Butch van Breda Kolff, did not serve as the Western All-Stars coach. The coaching spot was instead filled by Richie Guerin of the second-place Atlanta Hawks.

== Teams ==
=== Eastern Division ===
Player, Team	MIN	FGM	FGA	FTM	FTA	REB	AST	PF	PTS
Oscar Robertson, CIN	32	8	16	8	8	6	5	3	24
John Havlicek, BOS	31	6	14	2	2	7	2	2	14
Bill Russell, BOS	28	1	4	1	2	6	3	1	3
Earl Monroe, BAL	27	6	15	9	12	4	4	4	21
Billy Cunningham, PHI	22	5	10	0	0	5	1	3	10
Gus Johnson, BAL	18	4	10	5	8	10	0	3	13
Jerry Lucas, CIN	17	2	5	4	5	6	1	3	8
Hal Greer, PHI	17	0	1	4	5	3	2	2	4
Wes Unseld, BAL	14	5	7	1	3	8	1	3	11
Willis Reed, NYK	14	5	8	0	0	4	2	2	10
Dave Bing, DET	13	1	3	1	1	0	3	0	3
Jon McGlocklin, MIL	7	1	2	0	0	1	0	0	2
Totals	240	44	95	35	46	60	24	26	123

=== Western Division ===
Player, Team	MIN	FGM	FGA	FTM	FTA	REB	AST	PF	PTS
Elgin Baylor, LAL	32	5	13	11	12	9	5	2	21
Wilt Chamberlain, LAL	27	2	3	0	1	12	2	2	4
Jeff Mullins, SFW	25	7	14	0	0	4	5	4	14
Lenny Wilkens, SEA	24	3	15	4	5	7	5	3	10
Joe Caldwell, ATL	23	6	9	0	1	4	3	5	12
Elvin Hayes, SDR	21	4	9	3	3	5	0	4	11
Lou Hudson, ATL	20	6	13	1	1	1	1	0	13
Rudy LaRusso, SFW	18	3	6	0	0	6	2	3	6
Jerry Sloan, CHI	18	2	8	0	1	3	0	5	4
Don Kojis, SDR	16	2	7	4	5	5	3	1	8
Dick Van Arsdale, PHO	10	2	4	0	0	1	0	0	4
Gail Goodrich, PHO	6	2	4	1	2	1	1	1	5
Jerry West, LAL (injured)
Totals	240	44	105	24	31	58	27	30	112

== Score by periods ==
Score by periods:	1	2	3	4	Final
East	35	25	26	37	123
West	19	34	30	29	112
