= NBA on SNI =

The NBA on SNI refers to National Basketball Association television coverage on the now defunct television network known as Sports Network Incorporated (later known as the Hughes Television Network). Coverage began in the 1962-63 season (after the NBA's deal with NBC ended) and lasted through the 1963-64 season (when the NBA entered an agreement with ABC).

== Overview ==
1962-63

For 1962–63, SNI did two games. The first one being the All-Star Game at Los Angeles Memorial Sports Arena with Chick Hearn and Bud Blattner on the call. The second game was the sixth and deciding game of the NBA Finals between the Boston Celtics and Los Angeles Lakers with Bob Wolff on the call.

1963-64

For 1963–64, SNI broadcast a series of Thursday night games starting January 2. The broadcast teams during the regular season were Marty Glickman and Carl Braun for games in the Eastern Division and Bud Blattner and Ed Macauley for games in the Western Division. The Thursday night series was shown on channel 9 in New York; some of the playoff games may not have been carried in New York due to conflicts with Mets telecasts.

They also broadcast the All-Star Game from Boston with Marty Glickman and Bud Blattner sharing play-by-play duties and with Carl Braun and Ed Macauley doing analysis.

SNI broadcast at least four playoff games starting on March 28 with St. Louis at Los Angeles with Jerry Gross on play-by-play and Ed Macauley on color commentary. The other games (all involving Marty Glickman on play-by-play) included:

- Cincinnati at Boston on April 9
- St. Louis at San Francisco on April 16
- Boston at San Francisco on April 24

Carl Braun, Alex Hannum, and Fred Schaus were the respective analysts for the April 9, April 16, and April 24 playoff broadcasts.

== See also ==
- NBA Entertainment

Preceded by NBC	NBA network broadcast partner 1962–1964	Succeeded by ABC
