= 1971 NBA All-Star Game =

Exhibition basketball game

	1	2	3	4	Total
East	26	34	23	24	107
West	30	32	20	26	108
- Date: January 12, 1971
- Arena: San Diego Sports Arena
- City: San Diego
- MVP: Lenny Wilkens
- Attendance: 14,378
- Network: ABC
- Announcers: Chris Schenkel and Jack Twyman

NBA All-Star Game
< 1970	1972 >

The 21st Annual NBA All-Star Game was an exhibition basketball game played at the San Diego Sports Arena, in San Diego, California, the home of the San Diego Rockets, on January 12, 1971, during the 1970–71 NBA season, which commemorated the 50th anniversary of National Basketball Association. This was the only NBA All-Star Game held in San Diego to date. The Rockets relocated to Houston after the season, and the city did not host another All-Star Game despite the San Diego Clippers (now Los Angeles Clippers) playing there from 1978 to 1984.

The coach for the East team was Red Holzman of the New York Knicks and the West team was coached by Larry Costello of the Milwaukee Bucks, as both teams had led their respective conferences. Officials for the game were Mendy Rudolph and Ed T. Rush. The announced attendance was 14,378. The West beat the East 108–107. Lenny Wilkens of the Seattle SuperSonics was named the game's most valuable player, scoring 21 points.

== Team rosters ==
=== Western Conference ===
Player, Team	MIN	FGM	FGA	FTM	FTA	REB	AST	PF	PTS
Lew Alcindor, MIL	30	8	16	3	4	14	1	2	19
Jerry Lucas, SFW	29	5	9	2	2	9	4	2	12
Oscar Robertson, MIL	24	2	6	1	3	2	2	3	5
Bob Love, CHI	21	6	12	4	5	4	0	2	16
Lenny Wilkens, SEA	20	8	11	5	5	1	1	1	21
Jerry West, LAL	20	2	4	1	3	1	9	1	5
Elvin Hayes, SDR	19	4	13	2	3	4	2	1	10
Chet Walker, CHI	19	3	9	4	5	3	1	1	10
Dave Bing, DET	19	2	7	0	0	2	2	1	4
Wilt Chamberlain, LAL	18	1	1	0	0	8	5	0	2
Dick Van Arsdale, PHO	12	2	4	0	1	5	3	1	4
Geoff Petrie, POR	5	0	3	0	0	0	1	0	0
Jeff Mullins, SFW	3	0	0	0	0	0	0	0	0
Connie Hawkins, PHO	1	0	0	0	0	0	0	0	0
Totals	240	43	95	22	31	53	31	15	108

=== Eastern Conference ===
Player, Team	MIN	FGM	FGA	FTM	FTA	REB	AST	PF	PTS
Willis Reed, NYK	27	5	16	4	6	13	1	3	14
Walt Frazier, NYK	26	3	9	0	0	6	5	2	6
John Havlicek, BOS	24	6	12	0	2	3	2	3	12
Gus Johnson, BAL	23	5	12	2	2	4	2	3	12
Jo Jo White, BOS	22	5	10	0	0	9	2	2	10
Wes Unseld, BAL	21	4	9	0	0	10	2	2	8
Dave DeBusschere, NYK	19	4	7	0	0	7	3	3	8
Billy Cunningham, PHI	19	2	8	1	2	4	3	1	5
Earl Monroe, BAL	18	3	9	0	0	5	2	3	6
Lou Hudson, ATL	17	6	13	2	3	3	1	3	14
Tom Van Arsdale, CIN	11	4	8	0	2	2	1	1	8
Johnny Green, CIN	7	2	3	0	1	2	0	1	4
Bob Kauffman, BUF	4	0	2	0	0	0	0	0	0
John Johnson, CLE	2	0	0	0	0	0	1	0	0
Totals	240	49	118	9	18	68	25	27	107
