= 1964 NBA All-Star Game =

Basketball game

	1	2	3	4	Total
West	22	27	28	30	107
East	25	34	27	25	111
- Date: January 14, 1964
- Arena: Boston Garden
- City: Boston
- MVP: Oscar Robertson
- Attendance: 13,464
- Network: SNI
- Announcers: Marty Glickman and Carl Braun (first half); Buddy Blattner and Ed Macauley (second half)

NBA All-Star Game
< 1963	1965 >

The 14th Annual NBA All-Star Game was an exhibition basketball game played on January 14, 1964, at the Boston Garden in Boston, the home of the Boston Celtics. This was the fourth and most recent NBA All-Star Game to be held in Boston, after previous editions were held there in 1951, 1952, and 1957. This was also the final NBA All-Star Game held at the Boston Garden, which eventually closed in 1995.

The East won the game 111–107. Oscar Robertson was named the Most Valuable Player with 26 points and 8 assists, both game highs, as well as 14 rebounds.

The NBA Old-Timers Game was also held that day, making a return after a seven-year hiatus before going on another break, which lasted 20 years.

== Historical significance ==
The game was notable for the threat of a strike by the players, who refused to play just before the game unless the owners agreed to recognize the players' union, occurring amidst a historic blizzard. The owners agreed primarily because it was the first All-Star Game to be televised and if it were not played due to strike it would have been embarrassing at a time when the NBA was still attempting to gain national exposure. The NBA did not have a national TV contract at the time, but ABC agreed to televise the All-Star game and consider a contract for continuing coverage. They made it clear that if the All-Star Game was not played, ABC would drop its interest completely. This led directly to many rights and freedoms not previously extended to professional basketball players.

== Coaches ==
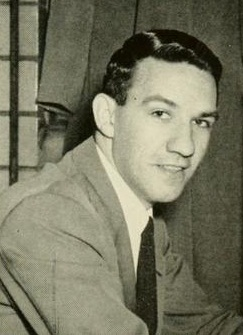
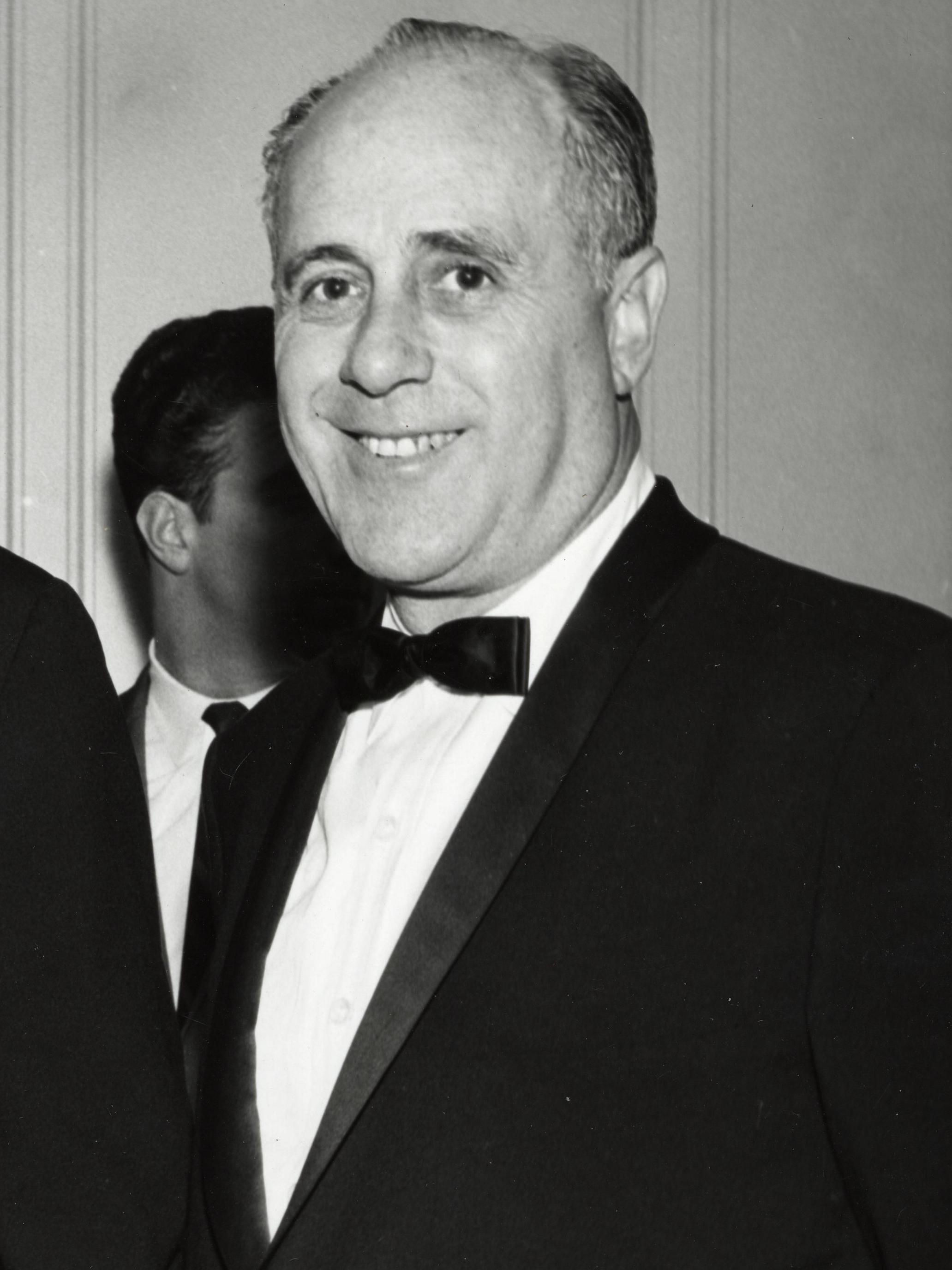
Fred Schaus and Red Auerbach were selected as the West and East head coach, respectively.

The coaches were the Celtics' Red Auerbach for the East and the Los Angeles Lakers' Fred Schaus for the West, as their respective teams had the best records in their respective divisions entering the game. This was the third straight All-Star Game with Auerbach and Schaus as coaches.

== Eastern Division ==
Player, Team	MIN	FGM	FGA	FTM	FTA	REB	AST	PF	PTS
Oscar Robertson, CIN	42	10	23	6	10	14	8	4	26
Bill Russell, BOS	42	6	13	1	2	21	2	4	13
Jerry Lucas, CIN	36	3	6	5	6	8	0	5	11
Sam Jones, BOS	27	8	20	0	0	4	3	2	16
Wayne Embry, CIN	21	6	14	1	1	7	1	1	13
Tom Heinsohn, BOS	21	5	12	0	0	3	0	5	10
Hal Greer, PHI	20	5	10	3	4	3	4	1	13
Len Chappell, NYK	12	1	5	2	2	1	2	2	4
Chet Walker, PHI	12	2	5	0	0	0	0	1	4
Tom Gola, NYK	7	0	0	1	2	0	1	2	1
Totals	240	46	108	19	27	61	21	27	111

== Western Division ==
Player, Team	MIN	FGM	FGA	FTM	FTA	REB	AST	PF	PTS
Jerry West, LAL	42	8	20	1	1	4	5	3	17
Wilt Chamberlain, SFW	37	4	14	11	14	20	1	2	19
Bob Pettit, STL	36	6	15	7	9	17	2	3	19
Elgin Baylor, LAL	29	5	15	5	11	8	5	1	15
Walt Bellamy, BAL	23	4	11	3	5	7	0	3	11
Guy Rodgers, SFW	22	3	6	0	0	2	2	4	6
Don Ohl, DET	18	3	9	2	2	2	0	2	8
Lenny Wilkens, STL	14	1	5	1	1	0	0	3	3
Terry Dischinger, BAL	13	2	4	3	3	2	1	1	7
Bailey Howell, DET	6	1	3	0	0	2	0	0	2
Totals	240	37	102	33	46	64	16	22	107

== Score by periods ==
Score by periods:	1	2	3	4	Final
East	25	34	27	25	111
West	22	27	28	30	107

- Halftime— East, 59–49
- Third Quarter— East, 86–77
- Officials: Sid Borgia and Mendy Rudolph
- Attendance: 13,464.

== NBA Old-Timers Games ==
The second NBA Old-Timers Game, which consist of teams of retired NBA players, was held. After which, it entered a hiatus until it was restored in 1984. The Eastern Old Timers beat the Western Old Timers, 50–46.
