= 1963 NBA All-Star Game =

Exhibition basketball game

	1	2	3	4	Total
West	25	25	23	35	108
East	32	24	24	35	115
- Date: January 16, 1963
- Arena: Los Angeles Memorial Sports Arena
- City: Los Angeles
- MVP: Bill Russell
- Attendance: 14,838
- Network: SNI
- Announcers: Chick Hearn and Bud Blattner

NBA All-Star Game
< 1962	1964 >

The 13th Annual NBA All-Star Game was an exhibition basketball game played on January 16, 1963, at the Los Angeles Memorial Sports Arena in Los Angeles, California, home of the Los Angeles Lakers. This was the first All-Star Game to be held in the Los Angeles metropolitan area.

This was the last All-Star game to feature one of the original All-Stars from the 1951 game, with Bob Cousy making his thirteenth and final All-Star appearances. The East All-Stars won 115–108, with Bill Russell of the Boston Celtics winning the NBA All-Star Game Most Valuable Player award after logging 19 points and 24 rebounds.

== Coaches ==
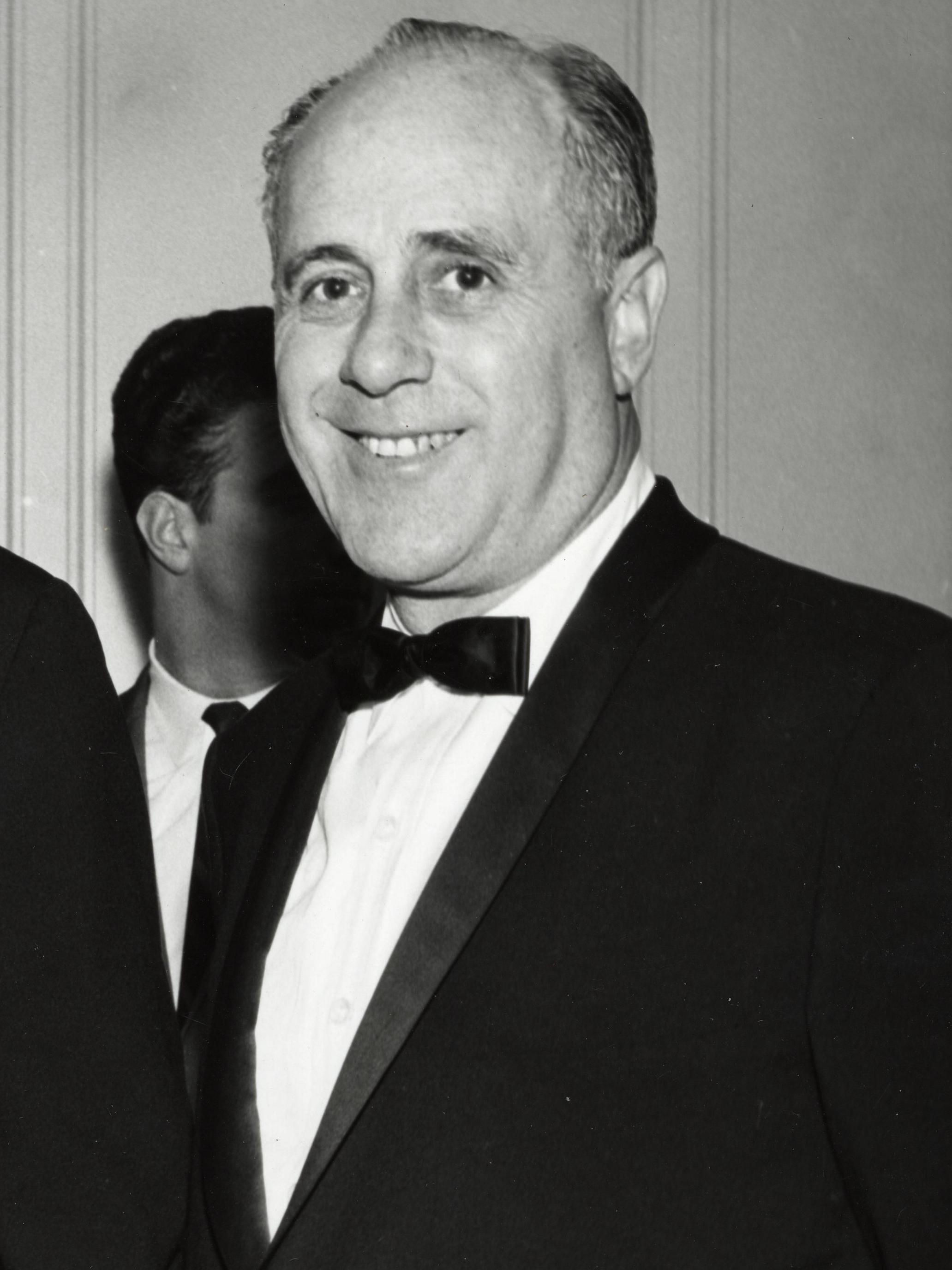
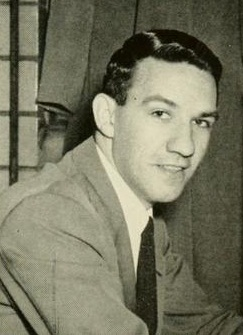
Red Auerbach and Fred Schaus were selected as the East and West head coach, respectively.

The coaches were the Celtics' Red Auerbach for the East and the Los Angeles Lakers' Fred Schaus for the West, as their respective teams led their respective divisions entering the game. This was the second straight All-Star Game with Auerbach and Schaus as coaches.

== Eastern Division ==
Player, Team	MIN	FGM	FGA	FTM	FTA	REB	AST	PF	PTS
Jack Twyman, CIN	16	6	12	0	0	4	1	2	12
Tom Heinsohn, BOS	21	6	11	3	4	2	1	4	15
Bill Russell, BOS	37	8	14	3	4	24	5	3	19
Oscar Robertson, CIN	37	9	15	3	4	3	6	5	21
Bob Cousy, BOS	25	4	11	0	0	4	6	2	8
Johnny Kerr, SYR	11	0	4	2	2	2	1	3	2
Lee Shaffer, SYR	19	6	13	0	0	1	1	3	12
Johnny Green, NYK	27	6	8	1	1	5	0	1	13
Tom Gola, NYK	18	1	3	0	0	2	1	3	2
Hal Greer, SYR	15	3	7	0	0	3	2	4	6
Richie Guerin, NYK	14	2	3	1	3	1	1	2	5
Wayne Embry, CIN	(injured)
Totals	240	51	101	13	18	51	25	32	115

== Western Division ==
Player, Team	MIN	FGM	FGA	FTM	FTA	REB	AST	PF	PTS
Walt Bellamy, CHI	14	1	4	0	2	1	2	3	2
Bob Pettit, STL	32	7	16	11	12	13	0	1	25
Wilt Chamberlain, SFW	35	7	11	3	7	19	0	2	17
Jerry West, LAL	32	5	15	3	4	7	5	1	13
Elgin Baylor, LAL	36	4	15	9	13	14	7	0	17
Tom Meschery, SFW	8	1	3	1	2	1	1	1	3
Don Ohl, DET	12	1	4	1	1	0	2	2	3
Lenny Wilkens, STL	25	2	7	0	1	2	3	0	4
Bailey Howell, DET	11	2	3	0	0	1	1	2	4
Rudy LaRusso, LAL	11	3	3	0	0	1	2	1	6
Terry Dischinger, CHI	7	3	3	1	1	1	0	0	7
Guy Rodgers, SFW	17	3	6	1	2	2	4	2	7
Totals	240	39	90	30	45	62	27	15	108

== Score by periods ==
Score by periods:	1	2	3	4	Final
East	32	24	24	35	115
West	25	25	23	35	108

- Halftime— East, 56–50
- Third Quarter— East, 80–73
- Officials: Sid Borgia and Earl Strom
- Attendance: 14,838.
