= List of NBA Finals broadcasters =

The following is a list of the television and radio networks and announcers that have broadcast NBA Finals games in the United States and Canada over the years.

In addition to the English-language broadcasts, the NBA Finals also have Spanish-language broadcasts since 2002.

== Television ==
=== English language ===
==== 2020s ====
Year	Network	Play-by-play	Color commentator(s)	Sideline reporter(s)	Rules expert(s)	Studio host	Studio analyst(s)	Trophy presentation
2026	ABC/ESPN DTC/Disney+	Mike Breen	Richard Jefferson and Tim Legler	Lisa Salters	Steve Javie	Ernie Johnson	Kenny Smith, Charles Barkley, Shaquille O'Neal, and Draymond Green (Games 3–4)	Ernie Johnson
2026	ESPN (alternate; Game 3)	—N/a				Pat McAfee	Kendrick Perkins, Quentin Richardson, "Boston" Connor Campbell, Tone Digs, and Ty Schmit	Ernie Johnson
2025	ABC	Mike Breen	Doris Burke and Richard Jefferson	Lisa Salters (Games 1, 5–7); Jorge Sedano (Games 2–4)	Steve Javie	Malika Andrews	Stephen A. Smith, Bob Myers, Kendrick Perkins, and Shams Charania	Lisa Salters
2025	ESPN+/Disney+ (Game 7)	Mike Breen	Doris Burke and Richard Jefferson	Lisa Salters (Games 1, 5–7); Jorge Sedano (Games 2–4)	Steve Javie	Malika Andrews	Stephen A. Smith, Bob Myers, Kendrick Perkins, and Shams Charania	Lisa Salters
2024	ABC	Mike Breen	Doris Burke and JJ Redick	Lisa Salters	Steve Javie	Malika Andrews	Michael Wilbon, Stephen A. Smith (all games), Bob Myers (Games 1–3, 5), Josh Hart (Games 1–2), Paul George (Games 3–4), Kendrick Perkins (Game 4), Julius Randle (Game 5), and Adrian Wojnarowski	Lisa Salters
2024	ESPN (alternate; Game 3)	—N/a				Kevin Hart	The Plastic Cup Boyz and various guests	Lisa Salters
2023	ABC	Mike Breen	Mark Jackson and Jeff Van Gundy	Lisa Salters	Steve Javie	Mike Greenberg	Jalen Rose, Michael Wilbon, Stephen A. Smith, and Adrian Wojnarowski	Lisa Salters
2023	ESPN2 (alternate; Game 1)	—N/a				Stephen A. Smith	Various guests	Lisa Salters
2022	ABC	Mark Jones (Game 1–2); Mike Breen (Games 3–6)	Mark Jackson; Jeff Van Gundy (Games 2–6)	Lisa Salters	Steve Javie	Mike Greenberg	Jalen Rose, Michael Wilbon (all games), Stephen A. Smith (Games 1–3, 5–6), Adrian Wojnarowski (Games 3–6), Magic Johnson (Game 1 only), and Kendrick Perkins (Game 4)	Lisa Salters
2022	ESPN2 (alternate; Game 1)	—N/a				Michael Eaves	CJ McCollum, Tim Legler and several guests	Lisa Salters
2021	ABC	Mike Breen	Mark Jackson and Jeff Van Gundy	Malika Andrews	Steve Javie	Maria Taylor	Jalen Rose, Jay Williams (Games 1–4), and Adrian Wojnarowski	Malika Andrews
2020	ABC	Mike Breen	Mark Jackson and Jeff Van Gundy	Rachel Nichols	Steve Javie	Maria Taylor	Jalen Rose, Jay Williams, Paul Pierce, and Adrian Wojnarowski	Rachel Nichols

===== Notes =====
- 2020: Due to the COVID-19 pandemic, the NBA postponed its regular season from March 11 to July 29, resuming with the seeding games for the 22 contending teams. Consequently, the 2020 Finals were played inside a bubble at the ESPN Wide World of Sports Complex in Bay Lake, Florida from September 30 to October 11, the latest date to end an NBA season. The Finals between the Los Angeles Lakers and the Miami Heat was the lowest-rated NBA Finals ever (4.0 rating over six games).
- 2021: Rachel Nichols was originally assigned to work as a sideline reporter, but was replaced by Malika Andrews after a private video leaked of Nichols uttering insensitive racial comments towards African American ESPN personality Maria Taylor. Both Nichols and Taylor eventually left ESPN, with Taylor heading to NBC Sports after a contract dispute, and Nichols agreeing to a buyout after she was taken off of ESPN programming and had her show, The Jump, canceled due to this incident.
- 2022: ESPN2 televised NBA Finals: Celebrating 75, a special alternate presentation for Game 1 which aired Thursday at 9 PM ET from Seaport District studios in New York. Several guests included Magic Johnson and Julius Erving. Mike Breen and Jeff Van Gundy missed Game 1 due to COVID-19 protocols, and Mark Jones filled in for Breen. Jones, Mark Jackson and Lisa Salters made history in Game 1 as the first all-African American broadcast team to cover an NBA Finals game. Breen also missed Game 2, whereas Van Gundy returned.
- 2023: NBA in Stephen A's World, an alternate broadcast of ESPN's NBA games with Stephen A. Smith as host along with various guests, aired on ESPN2 during Game 1 of the Finals.
- 2024: Doris Burke became the first woman to call an NBA Finals game on American network television, after previously working four NBA Finals on ESPN Radio.
- 2025: Jorge Sedano filled in for Lisa Salters as sideline reporter in Games 2, 3 and 4 due to Salters attending to a family matter.
- 2026: As part of a sublicensing agreement, TNT Sports will produce ABC's pregame, halftime, and postgame coverage featuring the Inside the NBA team, working the Finals for the first time.

==== 2010s ====
Year	Network	Play-by-play	Color commentator(s)	Sideline reporter(s)	Rules expert(s)	Studio host	Studio analyst(s)	Trophy presentation
2019	ABC (US)	Mike Breen	Mark Jackson and Jeff Van Gundy	Doris Burke	Steve Javie	Michelle Beadle	Jalen Rose, Chauncey Billups, and Paul Pierce	Doris Burke
2019	Citytv (Canada; games 1, 3 and 5)	Mike Breen	Mark Jackson and Jeff Van Gundy	Doris Burke	Steve Javie	Michelle Beadle	Jalen Rose, Chauncey Billups, and Paul Pierce	Doris Burke
2019	CTV2 (Canada; games 2 and 4)	Mike Breen	Mark Jackson and Jeff Van Gundy	Doris Burke	Steve Javie	Michelle Beadle	Jalen Rose, Chauncey Billups, and Paul Pierce	Doris Burke
2019	CTV (Canada; game 6)	Mike Breen	Mark Jackson and Jeff Van Gundy	Doris Burke	Steve Javie	Michelle Beadle	Jalen Rose, Chauncey Billups, and Paul Pierce	Doris Burke
2019	Sportsnet (Canada; games 1, 3 and 5)	Matt Devlin	Leo Rautins	Eric Smith	—N/a	Brad Fay	Alvin Williams and Sherman Hamilton	Doris Burke
2019	TSN (Canada; games 2, 4 and 6)	Matt Devlin	Jack Armstrong	Kate Beirness	—N/a	Rod Black; James Duthie (2nd panel)	Leo Rautins and Sam Mitchell; Chris Bosh (2nd panel)	Doris Burke
2018	ABC	Mike Breen	Mark Jackson and Jeff Van Gundy	Doris Burke	Steve Javie	Michelle Beadle	Jalen Rose, Chauncey Billups, and Paul Pierce	Doris Burke
2017	ABC	Mike Breen	Mark Jackson and Jeff Van Gundy	Doris Burke	Steve Javie	Michelle Beadle	Jalen Rose, Chauncey Billups, and Paul Pierce	Doris Burke
2016	ABC	Mike Breen	Mark Jackson and Jeff Van Gundy	Doris Burke and Craig Sager (Game 6)	Steve Javie	Sage Steele	Jalen Rose, Doug Collins, and Paul Pierce	Doris Burke
2015	ABC	Mike Breen	Mark Jackson and Jeff Van Gundy	Doris Burke	Steve Javie	Sage Steele	Jalen Rose, Doug Collins, and Dwyane Wade (Games 2, 3, 6)	Doris Burke
2014	ABC	Mike Breen	Mark Jackson and Jeff Van Gundy	Doris Burke	Steve Javie	Sage Steele	Jalen Rose, Doug Collins, and Bill Simmons	Stuart Scott
2013	ABC	Mike Breen	Jeff Van Gundy	Doris Burke	Steve Javie	Michael Wilbon	Magic Johnson, Jalen Rose, and Bill Simmons	Doris Burke
2012	ABC	Mike Breen	Jeff Van Gundy	Doris Burke	—N/a	Michael Wilbon	Jon Barry, Magic Johnson, and Chris Broussard	Stuart Scott
2011	ABC	Mike Breen	Mark Jackson and Jeff Van Gundy	Doris Burke	—N/a	Stuart Scott	Jon Barry, Michael Wilbon, and Magic Johnson	Stuart Scott
2011	ESPN 3D	Mark Jones	Bruce Bowen (Games 1–2, 5–6); Tim Legler (Games 3–4)	Doris Burke	—N/a	Stuart Scott	Jon Barry, Michael Wilbon, and Magic Johnson	Stuart Scott
2010	ABC	Mike Breen	Mark Jackson and Jeff Van Gundy	Doris Burke	—N/a	Stuart Scott	Jon Barry, Michael Wilbon, and Magic Johnson	Stuart Scott

===== Notes =====
- Per the current broadcast agreements, the Finals will be broadcast by ABC through 2036.
- For the 2019 Finals (the first to feature the Toronto Raptors), TSN and Sportsnet, the main Canadian rightsholders of both the NBA and the Raptors, were permitted to broadcast distinct Canadian telecasts, in addition to the ABC telecast being simulcast on their co-owned broadcast networks. Telecasts on both TSN and Sportsnet use a common technical crew employed by Raptors team owner Maple Leaf Sports & Entertainment.

==== 2000s ====
Year	Network	Play-by-play	Color commentator(s)	Sideline reporter(s)	Studio host	Studio analyst(s)	Trophy presentation
2009	ABC	Mike Breen	Mark Jackson and Jeff Van Gundy	Doris Burke	Stuart Scott	Jon Barry, Michael Wilbon, and Magic Johnson	Stuart Scott
2008	ABC	Mike Breen	Mark Jackson and Jeff Van Gundy	Michele Tafoya	Stuart Scott	Jon Barry, Michael Wilbon, and Guest Analysts	Stuart Scott
2007	ABC	Mike Breen	Mark Jackson and Jeff Van Gundy	Michele Tafoya and Stuart Scott	Dan Patrick	Jon Barry, Michael Wilbon, and Grant Hill	Dan Patrick
2006	ABC	Mike Breen	Hubie Brown	Lisa Salters and Stuart Scott	Dan Patrick	Mark Jackson and Michael Wilbon	Dan Patrick
2005	ABC	Al Michaels	Hubie Brown	Michele Tafoya and Stuart Scott	Mike Tirico	Bill Walton and Greg Anthony	Mike Tirico
2004	ABC	Al Michaels	Doc Rivers	Michele Tafoya and Stuart Scott	Mike Tirico	Tom Tolbert and Byron Scott	Mike Tirico
2003	ABC	Brad Nessler	Bill Walton and Tom Tolbert	Michele Tafoya and Stuart Scott	Mike Tirico	Sean Elliott and Guest Analysts	Mike Tirico
2002	NBC	Marv Albert	Bill Walton and Steve Jones	Jim Gray and Lewis Johnson	Bob Costas	Tom Tolbert	Ahmad Rashad
2001	NBC	Marv Albert	Doug Collins	Jim Gray and Lewis Johnson	Ahmad Rashad	Kevin Johnson, P. J. Carlesimo, Bill Walton, and Steve Jones	Ahmad Rashad
2000	NBC	Bob Costas	Doug Collins	Ahmad Rashad and Jim Gray	Hannah Storm	Isiah Thomas, Bill Walton, and Steve Jones	Ahmad Rashad

===== Notes =====
- Although the 2007 NBA Finals aired on ABC (as had been the case since 2003), they were the first to carry the "ESPN on ABC" branding instead of the ABC Sports branding.
  - 2007: The Finals between the San Antonio Spurs and the Cleveland Cavaliers was the lowest rated NBA Finals until 2020 (6.2 percent rating over four games).
  - Since 2007, NBA ratings have steadily risen, thanks to the resurgence of nationally recognized NBA teams, their star power, and their annual presence in the NBA Finals. Game 7 of the 2010 NBA Finals had the best rating for a basketball game in the contemporary NBA on ABC era, and the 2011 Finals held steady in the ratings department as well. Both series drew over a 10 rating, beating the World Series in consecutive years for the first time ever.
- 2006: Lisa Salters was the main sideline reporter alongside Stuart Scott with Michele Tafoya on maternity leave. She was the main ABC sideline reporter for that season before sliding back to secondary reporter with Tafoya's return.
- 2003: The series between the San Antonio Spurs and the New Jersey Nets was the lowest rated NBA Final (6.5 percent over six games) until 2007. This was also the only year that ABC broadcast both the NBA and the Stanley Cup Finals that involved teams from one city in the same year, as both the New Jersey Nets and the New Jersey Devils were in their respective league's finals. During ABC's broadcast of Game 3 between the San Antonio Spurs and the Nets in New Jersey on June 8, Brad Nessler said that ABC was in a unique situation getting ready for both that game and Game 7 of the Stanley Cup Finals between the Devils and the Mighty Ducks of Anaheim the following night, also at Continental Airlines Arena. Gary Thorne mentioned this the following night and thanked Nessler for promoting ABC's broadcast of Game 7 of the Stanley Cup Finals.
- During the 2002 NBA Finals, Ahmad Rashad had told The Los Angeles Times before the 2002 NBA Finals began that he would be ending his 20-year run on NBC Sports with Game 3 of the NBA Finals on the pregame show. A feature in which he interviewed Shaquille O'Neal and Kobe Bryant would be his last assignment for the network. He and Hannah Storm were replaced by Bob Costas as host of the pregame show for the Finals, and Rashad declined to join Hannah Storm on the post-game show carried by CNBC.
- 2001: NBC studio host Hannah Storm did not anchor the NBA Finals due to her being on maternity leave, so Ahmad Rashad replaced her. She returned to cover the NBA Finals in 2002, but as postgame host.

==== 1990s ====
Year	Network	Play-by-play	Color commentator(s)	Sideline reporter(s)	Studio host	Studio analyst(s)	Trophy presentation
1999	NBC	Bob Costas	Doug Collins	Ahmad Rashad and Jim Gray	Hannah Storm	Isiah Thomas, Bill Walton, and Peter Vescey	Ahmad Rashad
1998	NBC	Bob Costas	Doug Collins and Isiah Thomas	Ahmad Rashad and Jim Gray	Hannah Storm	Bill Walton, John Salley, and Peter Vescey	Ahmad Rashad
1997	NBC	Marv Albert	Matt Guokas and Bill Walton	Ahmad Rashad and Jim Gray	Hannah Storm	Julius Erving, Mike Fratello, and Peter Vescey	Ahmad Rashad
1996	NBC	Marv Albert	Matt Guokas and Bill Walton	Ahmad Rashad, Hannah Storm, and Jim Gray	Bob Costas	Julius Erving and Peter Vescey	Bob Costas
1995	NBC	Marv Albert	Matt Guokas and Bill Walton	Ahmad Rashad, Hannah Storm, and Jim Gray	Bob Costas	Julius Erving and Peter Vescey	Bob Costas
1994	NBC	Marv Albert	Matt Guokas	Ahmad Rashad and Hannah Storm	Bob Costas	Julius Erving and Peter Vescey	Bob Costas
1993	NBC	Marv Albert	Mike Fratello; Magic Johnson (Games 1–5)	Ahmad Rashad and Hannah Storm	Bob Costas	Quinn Buckner	Bob Costas
1992	NBC	Marv Albert	Mike Fratello; Magic Johnson (Games 1, 4–5)	Ahmad Rashad	Bob Costas	Quinn Buckner	Bob Costas
1991	NBC	Marv Albert	Mike Fratello	Ahmad Rashad and Steve Jones	Bob Costas	Pat Riley	Bob Costas
1990	CBS	Dick Stockton	Hubie Brown	James Brown	Pat O'Brien		Pat O'Brien

===== Notes =====
- The retirement of Michael Jordan set in motion the decline in NBA ratings which continued for several years. Ratings for the 1999 NBA Finals (which in fairness, came after a lockout shortened season) were down significantly from the previous year, from an 18.7 to an 11.3. Primetime regular season games, which had become fairly routine (and highly rated) during the Jordan years, set record lows for NBC once Jordan retired. With the rise of the Los Angeles Lakers in the early part of the 2000s (decade), ratings improved, but never to the level of the 1980s or 1990s. The highest NBA Finals ratings on NBC after Jordan left was the 2001 Finals, which featured the dominant and then-defending champion Lakers with Shaquille O'Neal and Kobe Bryant versus the polarizing Allen Iverson and the underdog Philadelphia 76ers. The ratings for that series were a 12.1, still down 35 percent from 1998. NBC's last Finals, in 2002, came after a resurgence in playoff ratings (including a 14.2 rating for Game 7 of the Western Conference Finals). However, the Finals itself registered the lowest ratings the event had seen since 1981, topping out at a 10.2 average.
- 1998: The Finals between the Chicago Bulls and the Utah Jazz was the highest rated NBA Finals ever (18.7 percent rating over six games). Game 6 registered a 22.3 Nielsen rating with a 38 share and attracted 72 million viewers and became the highest rated game in the history of the NBA. The previous record was a 21.2 rating and 37 share for Game 7 of the 1988 NBA Finals between the Los Angeles Lakers and Detroit Pistons.
- During the 1997 NBA Finals, Hannah Storm became the first woman to serve as pre-game host of the NBA Finals after serving as a sideline reporter for NBC in the past four years, but she wasn't the first female broadcaster to cover the NBA Finals (that honor goes to Lesley Visser).
- 1994: During Game 5 (June 17, 1994) most NBC affiliates (except for the network's New York and Los Angeles owned-and-operated stations (the latter of which did not carry most of the game), along with its Houston affiliate) split-screened coverage of the game with NFL Hall of Famer O. J. Simpson's low speed freeway chase with the LAPD.
- 1993: Magic Johnson was unavailable for NBC's coverage of Game 6 (the series clincher) because he was attending his brother Larry's wedding.
- 1992: Magic Johnson helped call Games 1, 4, and 5 for NBC.
- Once Larry Bird and Magic Johnson retired, the NBA's ratings sank, at least for one year. The 1990 NBA Finals, (which was played before either Bird or Johnson retired) which registered a 12.3 rating (and was the last Finals CBS aired) was the lone NBA Finals between the domination of Bird and Magic and the domination of then up-and-coming star Michael Jordan. In 1991, NBC's first year with the NBA, the network got its dream matchup. Jordan's Bulls finally broke through, after several years of being dominated by the Pistons, and made it to the Finals. Jordan and the Bulls played Magic Johnson and the Lakers, who were making what was to be their last appearance in the NBA Finals for the next nine years. The hype for the star-studded series was robust, and the ratings were the highest since 1987, when the Celtics and Lakers played for the final time. The next year, Jordan's Bulls once again made the Finals. Their competition that year was the Portland Trail Blazers, a team with fewer stars and from a smaller city. The ratings fell to a 14.2, the second-lowest rating for the Finals since 1986. In 1993, the NBA hit a high point. The six-game series between the Bulls and the bombastic Charles Barkley's Phoenix Suns averaged a 17.9 rating, a mark that eclipsed the previous record of 15.9.
  - The 1993 Finals were Jordan's last before his first retirement. The Houston Rockets would take the next two titles consecutively. The ratings for those next two Finals decreased, but still had above-average views, and the 1995 Finals even came to within .3 ratings points of the 1992 Finals and featured Superstar Shaquille O'Neal making the Finals with the Orlando Magic, which were swept 4–0 by the Rockets. After the two seasons, Jordan returned. Subsequently, and almost instantly, ratings greatly increased. Jordan's first game back, a March 19, 1995 game between the Bulls and the Indiana Pacers, scored a 10.9 rating for NBC, the highest rated regular-season NBA game of all time. Ratings for the Finals (which the Bulls played in the following three years) went up sharply as well. Game 1 of the 1996 NBA Finals between the Bulls and Seattle SuperSonics, the Bulls' 107–90 win at home in the United Center earned a 16.8 rating and a 31 share on NBC. In addition, Game 1 was viewed in a then record 16,111,200 homes. On June 16, 1996, Game 6 of the NBA Finals (where the Bulls clinched their fourth NBA Championship in six years) drew an 18.8 rating and a 35 share. The six games of the 1996 NBA Finals averaged a 16.7 rating which ranks second all-time behind the 1993 NBA Finals. The six games of the 1993 NBA Finals between the Bulls and Suns averaged a 17.9 rating. The next year, ratings for the Bulls–Utah Jazz series were slightly better, before the 1998 Finals blew away the 1993 record, averaging an 18.7 rating—one which will likely not be matched by the NBA Finals for the foreseeable future. The deciding Game 6 (and Michael Jordan's final game with the Bulls) registered an NBA record 22.3 rating with a 38 share. The game was viewed by 72 million people, breaking the record set earlier that postseason by Game 7 of the 1998 Eastern Conference Finals between the Pacers and Bulls (that same game set a record for highest-rated non-Finals NBA game with a 19.1/33). The 1998 Finals managed to best the ratings for that year's World Series, the first of only three NBA Finals ever to do so.
- Game 1 of the 1991 Finals, played on Sunday afternoon (June 2), was the last time an NBA Finals game was played as a matinee. Since then, weekend games of the Finals (as well as midweek games) have been played in the evening to accommodate prime-time television.

==== 1980s ====
Year	Network	Play-by-play	Color commentator(s)	Sideline reporter(s)	Studio host	Studio analyst(s)	Trophy presentation
1989	CBS	Dick Stockton	Hubie Brown	Pat O'Brien and James Brown	Brent Musburger; Pat O'Brien (Game 2 Only)		Brent Musburger
1988	CBS	Dick Stockton	Billy Cunningham	Pat O'Brien, Lesley Visser, and James Brown	Brent Musburger; Pat O'Brien (Game 2 Only)		Brent Musburger
1987	CBS	Dick Stockton	Tom Heinsohn	Pat O'Brien and James Brown (Games 3 and 4 Only)	Brent Musburger		Brent Musburger
1986	CBS	Dick Stockton	Tom Heinsohn	Pat O'Brien	Brent Musburger	Julius Erving and Moses Malone	Brent Musburger
1985	CBS	Dick Stockton	Tom Heinsohn	Pat O'Brien	Brent Musburger		Brent Musburger
1984	CBS	Dick Stockton	Tom Heinsohn	Pat O'Brien	Brent Musburger	Kevin Loughery	Brent Musburger
1983	CBS	Dick Stockton	Bill Russell	Pat O'Brien	Brent Musburger	Kevin Loughery	Brent Musburger
1982	CBS	Dick Stockton	Bill Russell		Brent Musburger (Games 1–2, 5, and 6); Frank Glieber (Games 2–4); Pat O'Brien (Game 5)	Hubie Brown and Kevin Loughery	Dick Stockton
1981	CBS	Gary Bender	Bill Russell and Rick Barry				Gary Bender
1980	CBS	Brent Musburger	Bill Russell and Rod Hundley	Rick Barry			Brent Musburger

===== Notes =====
- 1989: Pat O'Brien was the pre-game and halftime host for Game 2 because Brent Musburger was on assignment (Musburger was covering the College World Series for CBS). This was also in the case in 1988. This was Musburger's last NBA Finals assignment for CBS, as he was fired on April 1, 1990, months before NBA's television contract with CBS expired. Musburger moved to ABC and ESPN, and later called nine NBA Finals series for ESPN Radio between 1996 and 2004.
- In 1988, CBS achieved its only 20+ rating for an individual NBA game when the network got a 21.2 rating for Game 7 of the 1988 NBA Finals between the Lakers and Detroit Pistons. The Pistons would be in the next two NBA Finals, including a sweep the next year, and the lowest ratings CBS had seen in six years the year after that, with a 12.3 in 1990.
- 1987: James Brown was the sideline reporter for Games 3 and 4 (the latter being the Magic junior skyhook game) because Pat O'Brien attended the birth of son Sean Patrick. O'Brien called Games 1, 2, 5 and 6.
  - In 1987, the NBA Finals hit a then-record rating of 15.9. The 1990 NBA Finals was CBS' last, after nearly two decades televising the NBA. While the network broadcast every Bird-Magic Finals, it never broadcast any Final involving Michael Jordan, who, starting the year after CBS ended involvement with the league, would dominate the NBA in a way that neither Bird or Magic had. In 1990, the final year of the CBS deal, the regular season rating stood at a 5.2. (Each rating point represents 931,000 households.)
- Game 3 of the 1986 NBA Finals in Houston was played during the midst of an electrical storm that knocked the picture out for the approximately, the first six minutes of the fourth quarter. Although the video was already on the fritz towards the end of the third, CBS announcer Dick Stockton waited for nearly three minutes before adjusting to a radio play-by-play.
- 1984: The 1984 championship series was the most watched in NBA history, with soaring TV ratings.
  - Lesley Visser (the then wife of Dick Stockton) became the first woman to cover the NBA Finals.
- 1983: CBS joined Game 1 in progress with 7:37 left in the first period (meaning, there was no standard pregame coverage). Following the introduction montage (which was notable as it marked premiere of the intercutting, Bill Feigenbaum created CGI rendering of Boston Garden, used by CBS through the start of the 1989 Finals) with narration by anchor Brent Musburger, things were quickly passed off to play-by-play man Dick Stockton.
- 1982: The '82 Finals marked the first time since 1978 that all games aired live in its entirely; As a compromise between CBS and the NBA, the season returned to late October after starting it in early October the previous two seasons, meaning that the championship series started after the conclusion of May sweeps. Also, Brent Musburger served as anchor for Game 1 in Philadelphia, but had to anchor Games 2 and 3 from New York, because he hosted CBS Sports Sunday. So anchoring the coverage in Musburger's absence were Frank Glieber (Games 2–4) and Pat O'Brien (Game 5).
- From 1979–1981, CBS aired weekday NBA Finals games on tape delay if they were not played on the West Coast. Games were televised after the late local news (11:30 pm) in the CBS Late Movie time slot. In some cases, games were seen live in the cities whose local NBA teams were playing. In 1981 for example, WNAC-TV Boston and KHOU-TV Houston carried Games 1, 2, 5 and 6 live, although most viewers around the country had to wait until after the late local news to see them.
  - 1980 NBA Finals: The series-deciding Game 6 became the most notorious example of CBS's practice of showing even the most important NBA games on "tape delay" broadcasts. Because May 16, 1980 was a Friday, the network did not want to preempt two of its highest-rated shows, The Dukes of Hazzard and Dallas, even though both shows were already in reruns: the 1979–80 TV season had ended early, back in March, in anticipation of a strike that summer by the Screen Actors Guild. So Game 6 was shown at 11:30 pm Eastern (10:30 pm Central) in all but four US cities: Los Angeles, Philadelphia, Portland and Seattle, who carried it live. The game was not broadcast at all in Atlanta. (This is often cited as an example of TV's lack of interest in the NBA in the "pre-Magic and Bird" era.)
    - On a side note, here, in Game 4 of the 1980 Finals, Julius Erving executed the legendary Baseline Move, an incredible, behind-the-board reverse layup that seemed to defy gravity. Play-by-play announcer Brent Musburger has noted that Erving made such moves almost routinely in his ABA days—but the ABA had no national TV contract in those days. This Game 4 move, played to a national audience in a title game, has probably become Julius Erving's most famous move.
  - 1981: The series between the Boston Celtics and the Houston Rockets was the lowest rated NBA Finals in history (6.7 rating over six games), until the 2003 NBA Finals drew only 6.5 percent of American television households. Four games of the 1981 series (Games 1, 2, 5 and the climatic Game 6) were telecast on tape delay outside of Boston and Houston.
    - As previously mentioned, before 2003, the 1981 NBA Finals received the lowest television rating in NBA history. The 1981 Finals drew a 6.7 rating, according to Nielsen Media Research. Meanwhile, the 2003 Finals between the San Antonio Spurs and New Jersey Nets drew a 6.5 rating. Due to this, the 1981 Finals were the last to be broadcast on tape-delay, with weeknight games airing after the late local news in most cities. Games 3 and 4 were played back-to-back on Saturday and Sunday, May 9 and 10, to give CBS two live Finals games. Following the Finals, Gary Bender was relegated to tertiary play-by-play for the rest of his tenure in CBS, while Rick Barry's contract, following his questionable racial comments about Bill Russell during the Finals, was not renewed. Russell would remain the main color commentator for the next two years alongside newly promoted main play-by-play commentator Dick Stockton. Curiously, Barry and Russell would reunite, this time on the NBA on TBS during the mid-1980s. Russell was replaced as CBS' lead analyst following the 1983 Finals by former Celtics teammate Tom Heinsohn.

==== 1970s ====
Year	Network	Play-by-play	Color commentator(s)	Sideline reporter	Studio host	Trophy presentation
1979	CBS	Brent Musburger	Rick Barry and Rod Hundley	Stu Lantz		Brent Musburger
1978	CBS	Brent Musburger	Rick Barry; Steve Jones (Game 1); John Havlicek (Games 2, 4 and 7); Gus Johnson (Game 3); Keith Erickson (Games 4 and 5)			Brent Musburger
1977	CBS	Brent Musburger	Rick Barry and Steve Jones			
1976	CBS	Brent Musburger	Rick Barry and Mendy Rudolph	Sonny Hill		Mendy Rudolph
1975	CBS	Brent Musburger	Oscar Robertson			Oscar Robertson
1974	CBS	Pat Summerall	Rick Barry and Rod Hundley			
1973	ABC	Keith Jackson	Bill Russell	Chris Schenkel	Howard Cosell	
1972	ABC	Keith Jackson	Bill Russell	Chris Schenkel	Howard Cosell	
1971	ABC	Chris Schenkel	Jack Twyman			Jack Twyman
1970	ABC	Chris Schenkel	Jack Twyman		Howard Cosell	

===== Notes =====
- 1977: The post-game trophy presentation following Game 6 was never aired because CBS decided to air the Kemper Open following the game. Initially CBS wanted a 10:30 am. PT start to accommodate the golf tournament but the NBA refused, instead settling for the 12:00 pm. PT start time.
- 1976: There were three days of rest between Game 1 Sunday, May 23 and Game 2 Thursday, May 27, so that CBS would not have to count an NBA game in the Nielsen ratings for the May sweeps period. The 1976 May sweeps period ended Wednesday, May 26.
  - Game 3 tipped off at 10:30 am. MST to allow CBS to cover The Memorial golf tournament following the game. Church attendance that Sunday was sharply lower across Arizona, drawing an angry response from many clergy throughout the state.
  - CBS play-by-play announcer Brent Musburger, in a Fall 2009 interview with ESPN, said that he and color announcer Rick Barry were rooting for Phoenix to win Games 3, 4, and 6, although Barry's Golden State Warriors were eliminated by the Suns in the Western Conference Finals. Musburger said that this was because he and Barry were paid by the game. Since the Series was 2–0 Boston after the first two games, Musburger and Barry wanted the Suns to win the next two games to tie the series (likewise with Game 6). Boston fans, unaware of Musburger's and Barry's motivations, were upset with the announcing crew because of their apparent favoritism.
- 1970: The first NBA Finals to be nationally televised in full.
  - ABC's coverage of Game 7 was blacked out on WABC-TV in the New York area. Play-by-play man Chris Schenkel made an announcement during the broadcast that the game would be rebroadcast in New York at 11:30 p.m. ET. The game was shown live on the MSG Network in New York City, which was then only available in about 25,000 cable households in Manhattan.

====== Surviving broadcasts ======
- 1970: Lakers–Knicks – Game 7 is intact.
- 1973: Knicks–Lakers – Games 1–4 is missing, but Game 5 was found and shown as a special on the MSG network in 2013.

==== 1960s ====
Year	Network	Games	Play-by-play	Color commentator
1969	ABC	3, 5–7	Chris Schenkel	Jack Twyman
1969	Synd.	4	Bob Wolff	Ed Macauley
1968	ABC	1, 4	Chris Schenkel	Jack Twyman
1967	ABC	2, 5	Chris Schenkel	Jack Twyman
1966	ABC	1, 5	Chris Schenkel	Bob Cousy
1966	Synd.	7	Bob Wolff	Jack Twyman
1965	ABC	1, 5	Chris Schenkel	Bob Cousy
1964	SNI	4	Marty Glickman	Fred Schaus
1963	SNI	6	Bob Wolff	
1962	NBC	1–2	Bob Wolff	Bud Palmer
1961	NBC	1, 3–4	Lindsey Nelson	Bud Palmer
1960	NBC	1, 3–4, 7	Lindsey Nelson	Curt Gowdy

===== Notes =====
- 1969 – Game 7 was televised by ABC in prime time.
- In Game 4 of the 1965 Finals, the Boston Celtics beat the Los Angeles Lakers 112 to 99. In the closing minutes of the game, ABC cut away to a previously scheduled program. This event was likened to NBC cutting away from the World Series with the home team ahead 10 runs in the ninth inning.
- For the majority of the 1960s, ABC only televised Sunday afternoon games, including the playoffs. ABC did not have to televise the deciding game if it occurred on a weeknight.
- For the 1962–63 season, SNI did two games. The first one being the All-Star Game at Los Angeles with Chick Hearn and Bud Blattner on the call. The second game was the sixth and deciding game of the NBA Finals between the Boston Celtics and Los Angeles Lakers with Bob Wolff on the call.
- 1962 – All of the games from Boston were televised in Los Angeles on Channel 9 (then called KHJ-TV) with Chick Hearn on play-by-play. For Game 7, Jack Drees joined the broadcast team. In addition, Chick Hearn indicated that Game 7 was being syndicated around the nation to a variety of cities. The game was broadcast in Boston by WHDH-TV, but the station originated its own broadcast with Don Gillis as the commentator.

====== Surviving broadcasts ======
- 1969: Celtics–Lakers – only the entire 4th quarter of Game 7 exist.
- 1963: Celtics–Lakers – The deciding Game 6 exists as video, and has been aired on NBA TV's Hardwood Classics.

==== 1950s ====
Year	Network	Games	Play-by-play	Color commentator
1959	NBC	1–2	Lindsey Nelson	Curt Gowdy
1958	NBC	1	Lindsey Nelson	Curt Gowdy
1957	NBC	1, 7	Lindsey Nelson	Curt Gowdy
1956	NBC	1	Lindsey Nelson	Curt Gowdy
1955	NBC	2, 6	Marty Glickman	Lindsey Nelson
1954	DuMont	2, 5	Marty Glickman	Lindsey Nelson

=== Spanish language ===
==== 2020s ====
Year	Network	Play-by-play	Color commentator(s)	Sideline reporter(s)	Studio host	Studio analyst(s)
2026	ESPN Deportes	Ernesto Jerez	Fabricio Oberto	Sebastian Christensen and Katia Castorena	Leo Montero	
2025	ESPN Deportes	Ernesto Jerez	Fabricio Oberto	Sebastian Christensen and Katia Castorena	Leo Montero	
2024	ESPN Deportes	Ernesto Jerez	Fabricio Oberto	Sebastian Christensen and Katia Castorena	Leo Montero	Andrés Nocioni
2023	ESPN Deportes	Ernesto Jerez	Fabricio Oberto	Sebastian Christensen and Katia Castorena	Leo Montero	Andrés Nocioni
2022	ESPN Deportes	Ernesto Jerez	Fabricio Oberto	Sebastian Christensen and Katia Castorena	Leo Montero	Andrés Nocioni
2021	ESPN Deportes	Ernesto Jerez	Fabricio Oberto	Sebastian Christensen	Leo Montero	Andrés Nocioni
2020	ESPN Deportes	Ernesto Jerez	Carlos Morales	Sebastian Christensen	Leo Montero	Fabricio Oberto

==== 2010s ====
Year	Network	Play-by-play	Color commentator(s)	Sideline reporter(s)	Studio host	Studio analyst(s)
2019	ESPN Deportes	Álvaro Martín	Carlos Morales	Sebastian Christensen	Ernesto Jerez	Fabricio Oberto
2018	ESPN Deportes	Álvaro Martín	Carlos Morales	Sebastian Christensen	Ernesto Jerez	Fabricio Oberto
2017	ESPN Deportes	Álvaro Martín	Carlos Morales	Sebastian Christensen and Claudia Trejos	Ernesto Jerez	Fabricio Oberto
2016	ESPN Deportes	Álvaro Martín	Carlos Morales	Sebastian Christensen and Claudia Trejos	Ernesto Jerez	Fabricio Oberto
2015	ESPN Deportes	Álvaro Martín	Carlos Morales	Sebastian Christensen and Claudia Trejos	Ernesto Jerez	Fabricio Oberto
2014	ESPN Deportes	Álvaro Martín	Carlos Morales and Alejandro Montecchia	Sebastian Christensen	Claudia Trejos	
2013	ESPN Deportes	Álvaro Martín	Carlos Morales and Alejandro Montecchia	Sebastian Christensen	Claudia Trejos	Eduardo Nájera

== National radio ==
=== 2020s ===
Year	Network	Play-by-play	Color commentator(s)	Sideline reporter(s)	Studio host(s)	Studio analyst(s)
2026	ESPN	Marc Kestecher	Doris Burke and P. J. Carlesimo	Jorge Sedano	Jim Basquil	Cory Alexander
2025	ESPN	Marc Kestecher	P. J. Carlesimo	Jorge Sedano (Games 1, 5–7); Vanessa Richardson (Games 2–4)	Jim Basquil	
2024	ESPN	Marc Kestecher	P. J. Carlesimo	Jorge Sedano	Kevin Winter	
2023	ESPN	Marc Kestecher	Doris Burke and P. J. Carlesimo	Rosalyn Gold-Onwude	Kevin Winter	
2022	ESPN	Marc Kestecher	Doris Burke and P. J. Carlesimo (Games 1–2, 5–6)	Monica McNutt and Rosalyn Gold-Onwude	Kevin Winter	
2021	ESPN	Marc Kestecher	Doris Burke and Jon Barry		Kevin Winter	P. J. Carlesimo and Monica McNutt
2020	ESPN	Marc Kestecher	Doris Burke and P. J. Carlesimo		Kevin Winter	

==== Notes ====
- 2020: Doris Burke became the first female color commentator to call an NBA Finals game on radio
- 2025: Vanessa Richardson filled in for Jorge Sedano in Games 2, 3 and 4 due to the latter replacing Lisa Salters.

=== 2010s ===
Year	Network	Play-by-play	Color commentator(s)	Sideline reporter(s)	Studio host(s)	Studio analyst(s)
2019	ESPN	Marc Kestecher	Hubie Brown	Ramona Shelburne	Kevin Winter	Jon Barry
2018	ESPN	Marc Kestecher	Hubie Brown (Games 1–3); Jon Barry (Game 4)	Ramona Shelburne	Kevin Winter	Jon Barry (Games 1–3); P. J. Carlesimo (Game 4)
2017	ESPN	Marc Kestecher	Hubie Brown	Marc Stein	Kevin Winter	Jon Barry
2016	ESPN	Kevin Calabro	Hubie Brown	Marc Stein and Shelley Smith	Marc Kestecher	Jon Barry
2015	ESPN	Mike Tirico	Hubie Brown	Marc Stein	Marc Kestecher	Jon Barry
2014	ESPN	Kevin Calabro	Hubie Brown	Marc Stein	Marc Kestecher	Jon Barry
2013	ESPN	Mike Tirico (Games 1–3, 5–7); Kevin Calabro (Game 4)	Hubie Brown	Marc Stein	Marc Kestecher	Will Perdue
2012	ESPN	Jim Durham	Hubie Brown and Jack Ramsay	Ric Bucher	Marc Kestecher	Will Perdue
2011	ESPN	Mike Tirico	Hubie Brown and Jack Ramsay	Ric Bucher	Marc Kestecher	Will Perdue
2010	ESPN	Jim Durham	Hubie Brown and Jack Ramsay	Ric Bucher	Marc Kestecher	Will Perdue

=== 2000s ===
Year	Network	Play-by-play	Color commentator(s)	Sideline reporter(s)	Studio host(s)	Studio analyst(s)
2009	ESPN	Mike Tirico	Hubie Brown and Jack Ramsay	Ric Bucher	Marc Kestecher	Will Perdue
2008	ESPN	Mike Tirico	Hubie Brown	Ric Bucher	Marc Kestecher	Will Perdue
2007	ESPN	Mike Tirico	Hubie Brown	Ric Bucher and Lisa Salters	Marc Kestecher	Will Perdue
2006	ESPN	Jim Durham	Jack Ramsay			
2005	ESPN	Jim Durham	Jack Ramsay			
2004	ESPN	Brent Musburger	Jack Ramsay			
2003	ESPN	Brent Musburger	Jack Ramsay			
2002	ESPN	Brent Musburger	Jack Ramsay			
2001	ESPN	Brent Musburger	Jack Ramsay			
2000	ESPN	Brent Musburger	Jack Ramsay	Fred Carter and Quinn Buckner	Jim Durham	P. J. Carlesimo

=== 1990s ===
Year	Network	Play-by-play	Color commentator(s)	Sideline reporter(s)	Studio Host
1999	ESPN	Brent Musburger	Jack Ramsay		
1998	ESPN	Jim Durham	Jack Ramsay		
1997	ESPN	Brent Musburger	Jack Ramsay		
1996	ESPN	Brent Musburger	Jack Ramsay		
1995	NBA	Joe McConnell	Wes Unseld	Glenn Ordway	Tom Hanneman
1994	NBA	Joe McConnell	Bob Lanier		Tom Hanneman
1993	NBA	Joe McConnell	Bob Lanier		
1992	NBA	Joe McConnell	Dick Versace	Tom Hanneman	
1991	NBA	Joe McConnell	Frank Layden		
1990	ABC	Fred Manfra	Dick Vitale and Earl Monroe		

=== 1980s ===
Year	Network	Play-by-play	Color commentator(s)
1989	ABC	Fred Manfra	Dick Vitale and Earl Monroe
1988	ABC	Fred Manfra	Dick Vitale
1987	ABC	Fred Manfra	Dick Vitale
1986	ABC	Fred Manfra	Oscar Robertson
1985	ABC	Fred Manfra	Oscar Robertson
1984	Mutual	Tony Roberts	Oscar Robertson
1983	Mutual	Tony Roberts	Tom Heinsohn
1982	Mutual		
1981	Mutual		
1980	Mutual		

=== 1970s ===
Year	Network	Play-by-play	Color commentator(s)
1978	Mutual	Tony Roberts	Hubie Brown
1973	Mutual		
1970	Mutual		

== Local radio ==
NBA local teams each have their own respective radio networks serving different regions of their surrounding local areas, each with their own individually recognized flagship station.

Local team radio broadcasts are also available nationally on Sirius-XM, or internationally available on NBA League Pass.

=== 2020s ===
Year	Flagship	Radio Network	Play-by-play	Color commentator(s)
2026	WHSQ; WOAI	New York Knicks; San Antonio Spurs	Tyler Murray; Dan Weiss	Monica McNutt; Sean Elliott
2025	WFNI; WWLS	Indiana Pacers; Oklahoma City Thunder	Mark Boyle; Matt Pinto	Eddie Gill
2024	KEGL; WBZ-FM	Dallas Mavericks; Boston Celtics	Chuck Cooperstein; Sean Grande	Brian Dameris; Cedric Maxwell
2023	KKSE; WQAM	Denver Nuggets; Miami Heat	Jason Kosmicki; Jason Jackson	Scott Hastings; Amy Audibert
2022	WBZ-FM; KGMZ	Boston Celtics; Golden State Warriors	Sean Grande; Tim Roye	Cedric Maxwell; Tom Tolbert (Games 1–2 & 5) and Jim Barnett (Games 3–4 & 6)
2021	KMVP; WTMJ	Phoenix Suns; Milwaukee Bucks	Al McCoy; Ted Davis	Tim Kempton; Dennis Krause
2020	WAXY; KSPN	Miami Heat; Los Angeles Lakers	Mike Inglis; John Ireland	Ron Rothstein; Mychal Thompson

=== 1990s ===
Year	Flagship	Radio Network	Play-by-play	Color commentator(s)
1998	KFNZ; WMAQ	Utah Jazz; Chicago Bulls	Hot Rod Hundley; Neil Funk	Ron Boone; Derrek Dickey
1997	KFNZ; WMAQ	Utah Jazz; Chicago Bulls	Hot Rod Hundley; Neil Funk	Ron Boone; Derrek Dickey
1996	KJR; WMAQ	Seattle SuperSonics; Chicago Bulls	Kevin Calabro; Neil Funk	Marques Johnson
1993	KTAR; WMAQ	Phoenix Suns; Chicago Bulls	Al McCoy; Neil Funk	Cotton Fitzsimmons; Tom Boerwinkle
1992	KEX; WMAQ	Portland Trail Blazers; Chicago Bulls	Bill Schonely; Neil Funk	Mike Rice; Tom Boerwinkle
1991	KLAC; WLUP	Los Angeles Lakers; Chicago Bulls	Chick Hearn; Jim Durham	Stu Lantz; Johnny "Red" Kerr
1990	KEX; WWJ	Portland Trail Blazers; Detroit Pistons	Bill Schonely; George Blaha	Geoff Petrie; Greg Kelser

=== 1980s ===
Year	Flagship	Radio Network	Play-by-play	Color commentator(s)
1989	KLAC; WWJ	Los Angeles Lakers; Detroit Pistons	Chick Hearn; George Blaha	Stu Lantz; Greg Kelser
1988	KLAC; WWJ	Los Angeles Lakers; Detroit Pistons	Chick Hearn; George Blaha	Stu Lantz
1987	KLAC; WRKO	Los Angeles Lakers; Boston Celtics	Chick Hearn; Johnny Most	Stu Lantz; Glenn Ordway
1985	KLAC; WRKO	Los Angeles Lakers; Boston Celtics	Chick Hearn; Johnny Most	Keith Erickson; Glenn Ordway

=== 1970s ===
Year	Flagship	Radio Network	Play-by-play	Color commentator(s)
1976	KTAR; WBZ	Phoenix Suns; Boston Celtics	Al McCoy; Johnny Most	

==== See also ====
- NBA Showtime
- NBA on ABC
  - NBA Countdown
