= 1995 NBA Finals =

1995 basketball championship series

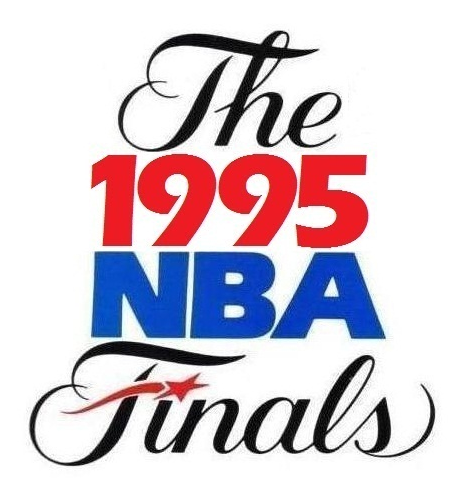
| Team | Coach | Wins |
|---|---|---|
| Houston Rockets | Rudy Tomjanovich | 4 |
| Orlando Magic | Brian Hill | 0 |
- Dates: June 7–14
- MVP: Hakeem Olajuwon (Houston Rockets)
- Hall of Famers: Rockets: Clyde Drexler (2004); Hakeem Olajuwon (2008); Magic: Shaquille O'Neal (2016); Coaches: Rudy Tomjanovich (2020); Officials: Dick Bavetta (2015); Danny Crawford (2025); Hugh Evans (2022)
- Eastern finals: Magic defeated Pacers, 4–3
- Western finals: Rockets defeated Spurs, 4–2

The 1995 NBA Finals was the championship series of the National Basketball Association's (NBA) 1994–95 season, and the conclusion of the season's playoffs. The series pitted the Eastern Conference champion Orlando Magic against the defending NBA champion and Western Conference champion Houston Rockets. Much pre-series hype concerned the meeting of the two All-Star centers—Shaquille O'Neal of the Magic and Hakeem Olajuwon of the Rockets—a matchup some compared to the Bill Russell–Wilt Chamberlain games of the 1960s. The Rockets swept the Magic, repeating as champions and becoming the lowest-seeded team ever to win the Finals.

In the 1995 playoffs, the Rockets became the first NBA team to win nine road playoff games and to beat four 50-win teams in a single postseason. It was the second NBA Finals sweep in the 2–3–2 Finals format (after the Detroit Pistons did so against the Los Angeles Lakers in 1989). The Rockets also became the first repeat NBA Champion in history to keep the title with a sweep. In addition, the Rockets became the first team in NBA history to win the title without having home-court advantage in any of the four playoff rounds since the playoffs was expanded to a 16 team format in 1984. Coincidentally, this feat would also be achieved in the NHL by the New Jersey Devils that same year, when they won the Stanley Cup over the Presidents' Trophy winning Detroit Red Wings.

The Orlando Magic, making their first NBA Finals appearance, began the series at home, hosting the defending champion Houston Rockets. With the Magic up 110–107 late in Game 1, Nick Anderson missed four consecutive free throws in the closing seconds of the game, and Kenny Smith hit a three-pointer, tying the game and sending it to overtime as well as setting a new Finals record, with the most three-pointers in an NBA Finals game with seven (later broken by Ray Allen, who hit eight three-pointers during Game 2 of the 2010 NBA Finals). The more experienced Rockets went on to win in overtime and eventually swept the Magic, winning their second consecutive NBA Championship. In achieving this, they earned the distinction of being the only team to win both championships during Michael Jordan's first retirement (although Jordan did return in the closing months of the 1994–95 season), in addition to being the only team other than the Chicago Bulls to win multiple championships in the 1990s. This was also the second consecutive 90s championship series not featuring the Chicago Bulls, a streak the Bulls would end in 1996.

The season-ending documentary Double Clutch by Hal Douglas, was released by NBA Entertainment to coincide with the Rockets' championship season.

As of 2026, the Houston Rockets, as a 6th seed in the 1995 playoffs, remain the lowest-seeded team to win the NBA Finals. They also remain the most recent team to win a championship despite winning less than 50 games in a full 82-game regular season. (Note: The 1999 San Antonio Spurs, 2012 Miami Heat and 2021 Milwaukee Bucks won less than 50 games in their championship-winning seasons, but they all took place during shortened seasons caused by a lockout or a global pandemic.)

== Background ==
=== Houston Rockets ===
The Rockets entered the 1994–95 season as defending champions. They had won their first eight games of the season, the first defending champions to have won their first eight games of their season since the 1987-88 Lakers. However, they struggled to maintain last season's form due to injuries and off-court-distractions. On February 14, the Rockets acquired Clyde Drexler from the Portland Trail Blazers, but the trade of a hometown hero (Drexler was a teammate of Olajuwon at the University of Houston) did not improve matters, and the Rockets settled for the sixth seed with a 47–35 record.

However, Houston once again lived up to its Clutch City reputation come playoff time. En route to the Finals, the Rockets defeated three teams with 55 or more victories. They began by ousting the Utah Jazz in five games (the Rockets trailed 2–1 after three games), then repeating last season's comeback effort over the Phoenix Suns (wherein the Rockets trailed 3–1 after four games). In Game 7 of that series, Phoenix led Houston 51–42 after the first half before Houston mounted a comeback to get the series win, 115–114. After dispatching the Suns, the Rockets upset the top-seeded San Antonio Spurs in six games of the conference finals, in which the first five games of the series were won by the road team, to become the first six seed to reach the NBA Finals since 1981. Like in the 1994 Finals, Olajuwon outplayed his contemporary at center, the league's Most Valuable Player, David Robinson.

=== Orlando Magic ===
The Magic were only in their sixth season of existence, but they were a team on the rise. Led by All-Stars Shaquille O'Neal and Penny Hardaway, new acquisition Horace Grant, and franchise cornerstones Nick Anderson and Dennis Scott, the Magic rolled through the Eastern Conference, winding up with a then-franchise best 57–25 mark.

Orlando's road to the Finals began with a convincing 3–1 series win over the Boston Celtics, which was the last game at the famous Boston Garden. They followed it up with a six-game ouster of Michael Jordan (returning from an 18-month retirement) and the Chicago Bulls in the second round, and in the conference finals, they vanquished the Indiana Pacers in a tough seven-game series.

=== Road to the Finals ===
| Houston Rockets (Western Conference champion) | | Orlando Magic (Eastern Conference champion) |
|---|---|---|
| # / Western Conference; # / Team / W / L / PCT / GB; 1 / z-San Antonio Spurs / 62 / 20 / .756 / –; 2 / y-Phoenix Suns / 59 / 23 / .720 / 3; 3 / x-Utah Jazz / 60 / 22 / .732 / 2; 4 / x-Seattle SuperSonics / 57 / 25 / .695 / 5; 5 / x-Los Angeles Lakers / 48 / 34 / .585 / 14; 6 / x-Houston Rockets / 47 / 35 / .573 / 15; 7 / x-Portland Trail Blazers / 44 / 38 / .537 / 18; 8 / x-Denver Nuggets / 41 / 41 / .500 / 21; 9 / Sacramento Kings / 39 / 43 / .476 / 23; 10 / Dallas Mavericks / 36 / 46 / .439 / 26; 11 / Golden State Warriors / 26 / 56 / .317 / 36; 12 / Minnesota Timberwolves / 21 / 61 / .256 / 41; 13 / Los Angeles Clippers / 17 / 65 / .207 / 45; 6th seed in the West, 11th best league record | Regular season | # / Eastern Conference; # / Team / W / L / PCT / GB; 1 / c-Orlando Magic / 57 / 25 / .695 / –; 2 / y-Indiana Pacers / 52 / 30 / .634 / 5; 3 / x-New York Knicks / 55 / 27 / .671 / 2; 4 / x-Charlotte Hornets / 50 / 32 / .610 / 7; 5 / x-Chicago Bulls / 47 / 35 / .573 / 10; 6 / x-Cleveland Cavaliers / 43 / 39 / .524 / 14; 7 / x-Atlanta Hawks / 42 / 40 / .512 / 15; 8 / x-Boston Celtics / 35 / 47 / .427 / 22; 9 / Milwaukee Bucks / 34 / 48 / .415 / 23; 10 / Miami Heat / 32 / 50 / .390 / 25; 11 / New Jersey Nets / 30 / 52 / .366 / 27; 12 / Detroit Pistons / 28 / 54 / .341 / 29; 13 / Philadelphia 76ers / 24 / 58 / .293 / 33; 14 / Washington Bullets / 21 / 61 / .256 / 36; 1st seed in the East, 4th best league record |
| Defeated the (3) Utah Jazz, 3–2 | First round | Defeated the (8) Boston Celtics, 3–1 |
| Defeated the (2) Phoenix Suns, 4–3 | Conference semifinals | Defeated the (5) Chicago Bulls, 4–2 |
| Defeated the (1) San Antonio Spurs, 4–2 | Conference finals | Defeated the (2) Indiana Pacers, 4–3 |

=== Regular season series ===
The Orlando Magic won both games in the regular season series:

November 23, 1994

Houston Rockets 94, Orlando Magic 117

Orlando Arena, Orlando, Florida

March 2, 1995

Orlando Magic 107, Houston Rockets 96

The Summit, Houston, Texas

== 1995 NBA Finals rosters ==
=== Houston Rockets ===
1994–95 Houston Rockets roster
Players

| Pos. | No. | Player | Height | Weight | DOB | From |
|---|---|---|---|---|---|---|
| SF | 15 | Tim Breaux | 6 ft 7 in (2.01 m) | 215 lb (98 kg) | 1970–09–19 | Wyoming |
| SF | 52 | Chucky Brown | 6 ft 7 in (2.01 m) | 214 lb (97 kg) | 1968–02–29 | NC State |
| PG | 10 | Sam Cassell | 6 ft 3 in (1.91 m) | 185 lb (84 kg) | 1969–11–18 | Florida State |
| PF | 32 | Pete Chilcutt | 6 ft 10 in (2.08 m) | 230 lb (104 kg) | 1968–09–14 | North Carolina |
| SG | 22 | Clyde Drexler | 6 ft 7 in (2.01 m) | 210 lb (95 kg) | 1962–06–22 | Houston |
| SF | 17 | Mario Elie | 6 ft 5 in (1.96 m) | 210 lb (95 kg) | 1963–11–26 | American International |
| PF | 7 | Carl Herrera | 6 ft 9 in (2.06 m) | 215 lb (98 kg) | 1966–12–14 | Houston |
| PF | 25 | Robert Horry | 6 ft 9 in (2.06 m) | 220 lb (100 kg) | 1970–08–25 | Alabama |
| PF | 27 | Charles Jones | 6 ft 9 in (2.06 m) | 215 lb (98 kg) | 1957–04–03 | Albany State |
| SG | 11 | Vernon Maxwell | 6 ft 4 in (1.93 m) | 180 lb (82 kg) | 1965–09–12 | Florida |
| SF | 31 | Tracy Murray | 6 ft 7 in (2.01 m) | 225 lb (102 kg) | 1971–07–25 | UCLA |
| C | 34 | Hakeem Olajuwon | 7 ft 0 in (2.13 m) | 255 lb (116 kg) | 1963–01–21 | Houston |
| PG | 30 | Kenny Smith | 6 ft 3 in (1.91 m) | 170 lb (77 kg) | 1965–03–08 | North Carolina |
| C | 55 | Žan Tabak | 7 ft 0 in (2.13 m) | 245 lb (111 kg) | 1970–06–15 | Croatia |

Coaches
Head coach
- Rudy Tomjanovich
Assistant(s)
- Bill Berry
- Jim Boylen
- Carroll Dawson
- Larry Smith

Legend
- (DP) Unsigned draft pick
- (FA) Free agent
- (S) Suspended
- Injured

=== Orlando Magic ===
1994–95 Orlando Magic roster
Players

| Pos. | No. | Player | Height | Weight | DOB | From |
|---|---|---|---|---|---|---|
| SG | 25 | Nick Anderson | 6 ft 6 in (1.98 m) | 205 lb (93 kg) | 1968–01–20 | Illinois |
| PF | 00 | Anthony Avent | 6 ft 9 in (2.06 m) | 235 lb (107 kg) | 1969–10–18 | Seton Hall |
| SG | 14 | Anthony Bowie | 6 ft 6 in (1.98 m) | 190 lb (86 kg) | 1963–11–09 | Oklahoma |
| PF | 54 | Horace Grant | 6 ft 10 in (2.08 m) | 215 lb (98 kg) | 1965–07–04 | Clemson |
| PG | 1 | Penny Hardaway | 6 ft 7 in (2.01 m) | 195 lb (88 kg) | 1971–07–18 | Memphis |
| C | 32 | Shaquille O'Neal | 7 ft 1 in (2.16 m) | 325 lb (147 kg) | 1972–03–06 | LSU |
| C | 30 | Tree Rollins | 7 ft 1 in (2.16 m) | 235 lb (107 kg) | 1955–06–16 | Clemson |
| SF | 5 | Donald Royal | 6 ft 8 in (2.03 m) | 210 lb (95 kg) | 1966–05–22 | Notre Dame |
| SF | 3 | Dennis Scott | 6 ft 8 in (2.03 m) | 229 lb (104 kg) | 1968–09–05 | Georgia Tech |
| PG | 20 | Brian Shaw | 6 ft 6 in (1.98 m) | 190 lb (86 kg) | 1966–03–22 | UC Santa Barbara |
| PG | 22 | Brooks Thompson | 6 ft 4 in (1.93 m) | 193 lb (88 kg) | 1970–07–19 | Oklahoma State |
| PF | 31 | Jeff Turner | 6 ft 9 in (2.06 m) | 230 lb (104 kg) | 1962–04–09 | Vanderbilt |

Coaches
Head coach
- Brian Hill
Assistant(s)
- Richie Adubato
- Tree Rollins
- Tom Sterner

Legend
- (DP) Unsigned draft pick
- (FA) Free agent
- (S) Suspended
- Injured

== Series summary ==
| Game | Date | Road team | Result | Home team |
|---|---|---|---|---|
| Game 1 | June 7 | Houston Rockets | 120–118 (OT) (1–0) | Orlando Magic |
| Game 2 | June 9 | Houston Rockets | 117–106 (2–0) | Orlando Magic |
| Game 3 | June 11 | Orlando Magic | 103–106 (0–3) | Houston Rockets |
| Game 4 | June 14 | Orlando Magic | 101–113 (0–4) | Houston Rockets |

This was one of only two NBA Finals in which the team who did not have home court advantage swept the series, (the other being the 1975 Finals, in which the Golden State Warriors swept the Washington Bullets).

All times are in Eastern Daylight Time (UTC−4).

=== Game 1 ===
NBC

June 7
9:00 pm

Houston Rockets 120, Orlando Magic 118 (OT)
Scoring by quarter: 19–30, 31–31, 37–19, 23–30, Overtime: 10–8
| Pts: Hakeem Olajuwon 31; Rebs: Clyde Drexler 11; Asts: Kenny Smith 9 | Pts: Hardaway, O'Neal 26 each Rebs: Grant, O'Neal 16 each Asts: Shaquille O'Neal 9 |
Houston leads the series, 1–0

Orlando Arena, Orlando, Florida
Attendance: 16,010
Referees:
- No. 27 Dick Bavetta
- No. 17 Joe Crawford
- No. 29 Steve Javie

Orlando led 110–107 with 10.5 seconds left, when Nick Anderson was intentionally fouled to send him to the free-throw line. Normally a respectable free-throw shooter (70.4 percent in the regular season), Anderson missed both of his free throws, but was able to grab the offensive rebound after the second miss and was fouled again. Anderson shockingly missed the next two free throws, and Houston grabbed the rebound, and would tie the game with 1.6 seconds left on Kenny Smith's 3-point shot. The shot was one of Smith's seven made 3-point shots, setting a then-Finals record. In overtime, Hakeem Olajuwon tipped in a missed finger roll by Clyde Drexler with three-tenths of a second left to win the game. Olajuwon finished the game with 31 points, 6 rebounds, 7 assists and 4 blocks while Kenny Smith recorded 23 points and 9 assists. Despite the Rockets miracle comeback, the game would ultimately known for Anderson's four consecutive missed free throw.

=== Game 2 ===
NBC

June 9
9:00 pm

Houston Rockets 117, Orlando Magic 106
Scoring by quarter: 28–19, 35–22, 27–30, 27–35
| Pts: Hakeem Olajuwon 34; Rebs: Hakeem Olajuwon 11; Asts: Clyde Drexler 5 | Pts: Shaquille O'Neal 33; Rebs: Shaquille O'Neal 12; Asts: Penny Hardaway 8 |
Houston leads the series, 2–0

Orlando Arena, Orlando, Florida
Attendance: 16,010
Referees:
- No. 43 Dan Crawford
- No. 42 Hue Hollins
- No. 4 Ed T. Rush

Hakeem Olajuwon recorded a double-double with 34 points and 11 rebounds to lead the Rockets to a 117–106 victory and a 2–0 series lead. The Magic, on the other hand, became the 2nd team in NBA Finals history to lose the first two of their four home games (and the last until 2026).

=== Game 3 ===
NBC

June 11
7:00 pm

Orlando Magic 103, Houston Rockets 106
Scoring by quarter: 30–28, 23–26, 22–21, 28–31
| Pts: Shaquille O'Neal 28; Rebs: Anderson, Grant, O'Neal 10 each Asts: Penny Hardaway 14 | Pts: Hakeem Olajuwon 31; Rebs: Hakeem Olajuwon 14; Asts: Drexler, Olajuwon 7 each |
Houston leads the series, 3–0

The Summit, Houston, Texas
Attendance: 16,611
Referees:
- No. 25 Hugh Evans
- No. 13 Mike Mathis
- No. 15 Bennett Salvatore

Robert Horry hit a three-pointer to give Houston a 104–100 lead with 14.1 seconds left. Orlando's Anfernee Hardaway then missed a three-pointer, and the rebound deflected off Dennis Scott and out of bounds with 6.8 seconds left, turning the ball over to Houston. Clyde Drexler was immediately fouled. He missed his first free throw and made the second for a 105-100 Rockets lead with 5.9 seconds left. Nick Anderson hit a three-pointer with 2.7 seconds left to bring the Magic within two points, and then Sam Cassell was immediately fouled. He needed to make both free throws to likely seal it, but missed the first. He made the second to give the Rockets a three-point lead with 2.2 seconds left. After a timeout to advance the ball to midcourt, the Magic had one last chance to tie the game and force overtime, but Hardaway missed a three-pointer as the buzzer sounded. The Rockets held on for a 106–103 win in Game 3 to take a 3–0 series lead and were one win away from their second consecutive NBA title.

=== Game 4 ===
NBC

June 14
9:00 pm

Orlando Magic 101, Houston Rockets 113
Scoring by quarter: 21–23, 30–24, 25–30, 25–36
| Pts: Hardaway, O'Neal 25 each Rebs: Grant, O'Neal 12 each Asts: Penny Hardaway 5 | Pts: Hakeem Olajuwon 35; Rebs: Hakeem Olajuwon 15; Asts: Clyde Drexler 8 |
Houston wins the NBA Finals, 4–0

The Summit, Houston, Texas
Attendance: 16,611
Referees:
- No. 17 Joe Crawford
- No. 20 Jess Kersey
- No. 21 Bill Oakes

At the end of the first half, the Magic had a 4-point advantage over the home team, Rockets. However, the Rockets had another notable comeback as they outscored the Magic 66–50 in the second half, thus winning their second consecutive NBA championship. Olajuwon outscored O'Neal by 10 points and capped off the sweep by hitting a memorable yet uncharacteristic 3-pointer in front of O'Neal. When accepting the Larry O'Brien Trophy on the floor of The Summit, Rockets head coach Rudy Tomjanovich said "Don't ever underestimate the heart of a champion!"

Olajuwon, with his 35-point and 15 rebound performance, was named Finals MVP for the second straight year. By winning his second straight NBA Finals MVP award, Hakeem Olajuwon became the sixth player to win the award on multiple occasions, joining Willis Reed, Kareem Abdul-Jabbar, Magic Johnson, Larry Bird, and Michael Jordan. Jordan and Olajuwon at the time were the only players to win the award consecutively.

Game 4 remains the most recent NBA Finals game played in Houston to date.

== Olajuwon v. O'Neal ==
Hakeem Olajuwon and Shaquille O'Neal statistical performance in the Finals:

| 1995 NBA Finals | Gm 1 | Gm 2 | Gm 3 | Gm 4 | Totals |
|---|---|---|---|---|---|
| Hakeem Olajuwon | 31 | 34 | 31 | 35 | 32.8 ppg |
| Shaquille O'Neal | 26 | 33 | 28 | 25 | 28.0 ppg |

Although both centers played well, Olajuwon outscored O'Neal in every game of the series and became one of the few players in NBA history to score at least 30 points in every game of an NBA Finals series. O'Neal later acknowledged that this loss was crucial for his development, noting that Olajuwon was the only center he could not intimidate with his size and athleticism.

== Player statistics ==
Legend
| GP | Games played | GS | Games started | MPG | Minutes per game |
| FG% | Field-goal percentage | 3P% | 3-point field-goal percentage | FT% | Free-throw percentage |
| RPG | Rebounds per game | APG | Assists per game | SPG | Steals per game |
| BPG | Blocks per game | PPG | Points per game |

Houston Rockets

Houston Rockets statistics
| Player | GP | GS | MPG | FG% | 3P% | FT% | RPG | APG | SPG | BPG | PPG |
|---|---|---|---|---|---|---|---|---|---|---|---|
| Chucky Brown | 4 | 0 | 9.5 | .455 | .000 | 1.000 | 2.8 | 0.0 | 0.0 | 0.5 | 3.0 |
| Sam Cassell | 4 | 0 | 23.3 | .429 | .467 | .833 | 1.8 | 3.0 | 1.8 | 0.0 | 14.3 |
| Pete Chilcutt | 3 | 0 | 1.0 | .000 | .000 | .000 | 0.0 | 0.0 | 0.0 | 0.0 | 0.0 |
| Clyde Drexler | 4 | 4 | 40.5 | .450 | .154 | .789 | 9.5 | 6.8 | 1.0 | 0.3 | 21.5 |
| Mario Elie | 4 | 4 | 40.3 | .649 | .571 | .900 | 4.3 | 3.3 | 2.0 | 0.0 | 16.3 |
| Robert Horry | 4 | 4 | 46.8 | .434 | .379 | .667 | 10.0 | 3.8 | 3.0 | 2.3 | 17.8 |
| Charles Jones | 4 | 0 | 14.3 | .500 | .000 | 1.000 | 1.8 | 0.0 | 0.0 | 0.0 | 1.0 |
| Hakeem Olajuwon | 4 | 4 | 44.8 | .483 | 1.000 | .692 | 11.5 | 5.5 | 2.0 | 2.0 | 32.8 |
| Kenny Smith | 4 | 4 | 26.3 | .379 | .421 | .000 | 1.8 | 4.0 | 0.3 | 0.0 | 7.5 |

Orlando Magic

Orlando Magic statistics
| Player | GP | GS | MPG | FG% | 3P% | FT% | RPG | APG | SPG | BPG | PPG |
|---|---|---|---|---|---|---|---|---|---|---|---|
| Nick Anderson | 4 | 4 | 40.3 | .360 | .323 | .300 | 8.5 | 4.3 | 2.0 | 0.5 | 12.3 |
| Anthony Bowie | 4 | 0 | 6.5 | .600 | .500 | .000 | 0.5 | 1.5 | 0.0 | 0.3 | 3.3 |
| Horace Grant | 4 | 4 | 42.0 | .532 | .000 | .800 | 12.0 | 1.5 | 0.5 | 0.5 | 13.5 |
| Penny Hardaway | 4 | 4 | 43.0 | .500 | .458 | .913 | 4.8 | 8.0 | 1.0 | 0.8 | 25.5 |
| Shaquille O'Neal | 4 | 4 | 45.0 | .595 | .000 | .571 | 12.5 | 6.3 | 0.3 | 2.5 | 28.0 |
| Donald Royal | 1 | 0 | 1.0 | .000 | .000 | .000 | 0.0 | 0.0 | 0.0 | 0.0 | 0.0 |
| Dennis Scott | 4 | 4 | 37.5 | .310 | .241 | 1.000 | 3.5 | 2.3 | 1.0 | 0.3 | 10.5 |
| Brian Shaw | 4 | 0 | 21.0 | .426 | .385 | .000 | 3.3 | 3.3 | 0.5 | 0.3 | 12.5 |
| Jeff Turner | 4 | 0 | 10.8 | .200 | .333 | .000 | 1.0 | 0.5 | 0.0 | 0.0 | 1.5 |

== Media coverage ==
In the United States, the NBA Finals was broadcast on NBC television, with Marv Albert, Matt Guokas and Bill Walton calling the action. Ahmad Rashad, Hannah Storm, and Jim Gray served as sideline reporters, and studio coverage was handled by Bob Costas, Julius Erving and Peter Vecsey. The games aired locally on NBC affiliates KPRC-TV (Houston) and WESH (Orlando).

National radio coverage was provided by the NBA Radio Network, with Joe McConnell and Wes Unseld on the call. After the season, NBA Radio was dissolved and subsequent national radio broadcasts of the NBA Finals would be handled by ESPN Radio.

== Aftermath ==
The Rockets 1995 title run is considered one of the toughest in NBA history. They did not hold home-court advantage in any round and beat three teams with a .700 winning percentage or better (the fourth team they beat, the 57-win Orlando Magic, were just one win from a .707 win percentage). In addition, Hakeem Olajuwon's 1995 playoffs is also considered one of the best individual runs from a star player, as he averaged 33 points on .531 shooting, 10.3 rebounds, and 2.81 blocks in 42.2 minutes across 22 games.

The four consecutive missed free-throws by Nick Anderson would haunt him for the rest of his career. After the Finals, Anderson would shoot only 60.5% on free-throws for the rest of his career.

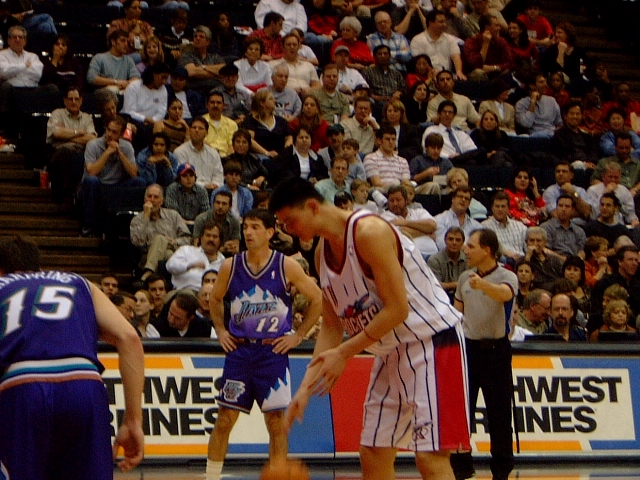
Future All-Star center Yao Ming wearing a rebranded Rockets jersey in 2002, which was the last year before another rebranding in 2003.

After two straight NBA championships, the Rockets changed their primary logo, which showed a light blue rocket flying past a red basketball with the team name "Rockets", and added new pinstripe uniforms adding dark navy blue to their color scheme. The new look initially faced criticism from fans, who felt it deviated too much from the team's previous iconic identity. However, over time, the new logo and colors became more accepted as one of the distinct logos of the late-1990s.

The Rockets' title reign ended in 1996, when they were swept by the Seattle Supersonics in the second round. The Sonics were also the last team to beat the Rockets in the playoffs prior to their championship run, having eliminated them in the second round in 1993. During the subsequent offseason, the Rockets made a blockbuster acquisition in the offseason by securing the services of former NBA MVP and 9-time All-Star Charles Barkley. But age and injuries would take its toll on Barkley as this led to the Rockets falling short of being unable to replicate their previous success after their two-year consecutive championship reign, with their closest achievement being a six-game defeat to the Utah Jazz led by Karl Malone and John Stockton in the 1997 Western Conference finals. As of 2025, this marks the most recent appearance by the Rockets in the finals.

The Orlando Magic won a franchise-record 60 games during the 1995–96 NBA season, but were swept by the Michael Jordan-led Chicago Bulls in the 1996 Eastern Conference finals. During the offseason, Shaquille O'Neal signed with the Los Angeles Lakers, with whom he went on to win three championships; he later added a fourth title to his resume with the Miami Heat in 2006. The Magic would not return to the Finals until 2009, guided by rising star Dwight Howard, but they were ultimately defeated by the Kobe Bryant-led Los Angeles Lakers in five games. They have not returned since.

O'Neal and Olajuwon faced off in the playoffs for the second and final time during the 1999 Western Conference First Round, with O'Neal's Lakers defeating Olajuwon's Rockets in four games. O'Neal outscored Olajuwon in the series, averaging 29.5 points to Olajuwon's 13.3 in the series. By this point, O'Neal was 27 and Olajuwon was 36. This would also mark Olajuwon's final postseason appearance with the Rockets, who was traded to Toronto a few seasons later.

This NBA Finals marked the last usage of the original script logo first unveiled in the 1986 Finals. For the 1996 Finals, the league unveiled a new logo with the Larry O'Brien Trophy along with modernized typography in gold inside a black oval. This logo was used until the 1999 Finals. An updated version of the original script logo was later used from the 2004 to the 2017 Finals.
