= Fred Manfra =

American retired sportscaster (born 1946)

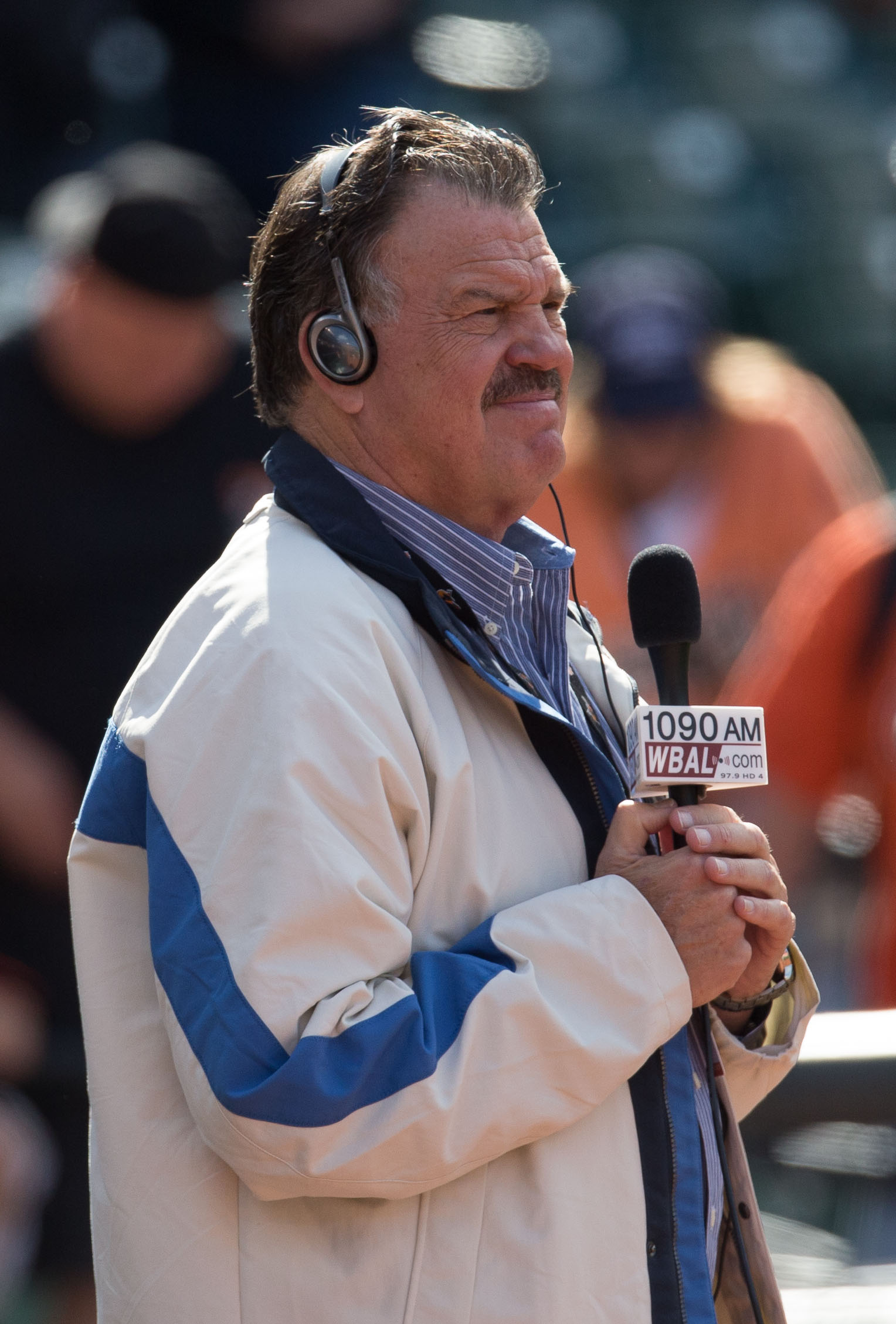
Manfra in April 2013

Fred Manfra (born September 1946) is an American retired sportscaster, best known for radio and television broadcasts of the Baltimore Orioles. He has covered many other sports, including football, basketball, ice hockey, horse racing and the Olympics. He retired in May 2017 as a Baltimore Orioles sportscaster.

== Biography ==
=== Early life and career ===
A Baltimore native, Manfra is a 1964 graduate of Patterson High School, where he was inducted into its Hall of Fame in 1996. He began his broadcasting career at radio station KREL in Corona, California in the early 1970s, and gradually moved up through other jobs in Ventura, California (KBBQ-FM and KBBY-FM), Davenport, Iowa (KSTT-AM), Milwaukee (WRIT-AM), and Detroit (WWJ-AM). He also worked for the Associated Press radio sports network in Washington, D.C. before moving to New York City to begin a long stint with ABC network radio.

=== ABC Radio ===
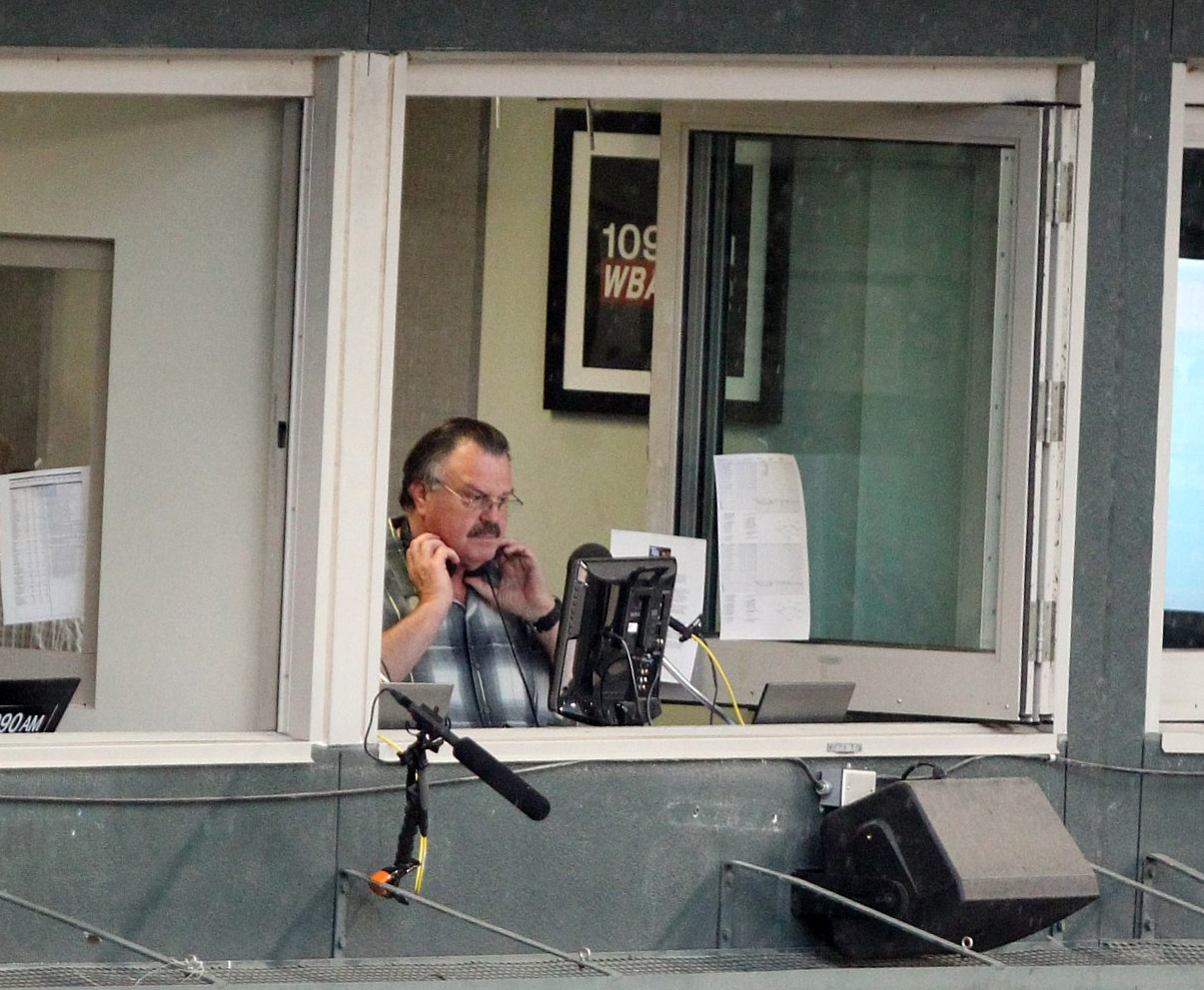
Manfra in the broadcast booth at Camden Yards, 2011.

Manfra worked for ABC for 15 years, doing many weekend sports shows. He has handled varied assignments including the NBA Finals and All-Star Game (1985–1990), Winter and Summer Olympic events, the NHL Stanley Cup Final and All-Star Game (1991), the Breeder's Cup (2000–2002), and horse racing's triple crown races. He also broadcast college football, USFL and arena football games, New York Knicks basketball, and boxing and wrestling events. He has also called football and basketball games for the Iowa Hawkeyes and the Michigan Wolverines.

=== Baltimore Orioles ===
Manfra was hired as a play-by-play announcer for Baltimore Orioles radio broadcasts on WBAL-AM on December 16, 1992. He succeeded Joe Angel, who had moved to the expansion Florida Marlins in a similar capacity. Primarily teamed with Jon Miller for most games, Manfra also worked with Chuck Thompson whenever Miller did Orioles telecasts on WMAR or Sunday Night Baseball on ESPN. He was joined in the radio booth by Angel upon the latter's return in early-February 2004. He works innings 3, 4, 6, and 7 while Angel does the rest. He drastically cut back his assignments in 2016, and only called 10 games in the first half of the 2017 season before his retirement on June 4 of that year. Manfra was inducted into the Orioles Hall of Fame in 2018.

=== Personal ===
Manfra and his wife live in Tampa, Florida, and have two grown daughters. While working for the Orioles, he lived in Fallston, Maryland. In April 2014, Manfra underwent hip replacement surgery, and required a second operation in May. These procedures kept him out of the broadcast booth for several months of the 2014 season.

Preceded by Tony Roberts	National radio play-by-play announcer, NBA Finals; 1985–1990	Succeeded by Joe McConnell
