= Am, Antes del Mediodía =

- Genre: Entertainment; Interview; News
- Created by: Luis Cella
- Directed by: Chocho Dominguez
- Presented by: Verónica Lozano; Leonardo Montero
- Voices of: Dalia Gutmann
- Opening theme: «AM»
- Country of origin: Argentina
- Original language: Spanish
- No. of seasons: 10

Production
- Running time: 120 minutes (including commercials)

Original release
- Network: Telefe
- Release: March 20, 2006 – December 30, 2015

AM, Antes del Mediodia is a television current affairs and Argentine varieties, is issued Monday through Friday from 10:00 to 12:00. issued by Telefe. It is presented by Verónica Lozano and Leonardo Montero.

== General information ==
The program has a humorous majority, general interest news, current affairs. was both the success of this program that Telefe decided to create a similar program that aired afternoons of 2011 with the same presenters.

== Awards ==
- 2013 Tato awards
  - Best magazine
  - Best female television host (Verónica Lozano)

=== Nominations ===
- 2013 Martín Fierro Awards
  - Best male television host (Leonardo Montero)
  - Best news reporter (María Pía Shaw)

== Staff ==
- Presenters: Veronica Lozano and Leonardo Montero.
- Journalists: María Pía Shaw, Laura Ubfal.
- Social issues: Darío Villarruel.
- Health topics: Darío Mindlin.
- Reporters: Santiago Zeyen and María Pía Shaw.
- Humorists: rabbit puppet Pepe Pompín.
- Voices: Dalia Gutmann - (until 2012) Carla Bonfante
