= NBA Radio Network =

The NBA Radio Network was the official national radio broadcaster, distributed by Public Interest Affiliates (PIA), a Chicago radio syndication company, of National Basketball Association games (more specifically, a regular season game of the week, the All-Star Game, as many as 31 playoff contests, including all of the conference finals and Finals, and even the draft and lottery) from the 1990–91 through the 1994–95 season. NBA Radio was ultimately supplanted by ESPN Radio.

== Commentators ==
=== Play-by-play ===
- Marv Albert (1992 NBA All-Star Game)
- Eddie Doucette (secondary play-by-play, 1990–1992)
- Jim Durham (secondary play-by-play, 1992–1993)
- Joe McConnell (lead play-by-play, 1990–1995)

=== Color commentators ===
- Quinn Buckner (1993 NBA All-Star Game)
- Bob Lanier (lead color commentator, 1991–1994, NBA Draft analyst, 1993–1994)
- Frank Layden (lead color commentator, 1990–1991)
- Wes Unseld (lead color commentator, 1994–1995)
- Dick Versace (secondary color commentator, 1992–1995)

=== Sideline reporters ===
- Chet Coppock (1990–1991)
- Tom Hanneman (1991–1995)

=== Studio hosts ===
- Chet Coppock (1990–1991, 1991 NBA draft host)
- Tom Hanneman (1992–1995) (1992 NBA draft host)
- Glenn Ordway (NBA Draft host, 1993–1995)

=== Studio analysts ===
- Rick Pitino (1995 NBA draft analyst)
- Bob Lanier (NBA Draft analyst, 1993–1994)
- Bill Raftery (NBA Draft analyst, 1993–1995)

Preceded by ABC Radio	National radio broadcaster, NBA; 1991–1995	Succeeded by ESPN Radio
