= Sunday Night Baseball =

American live sports television program

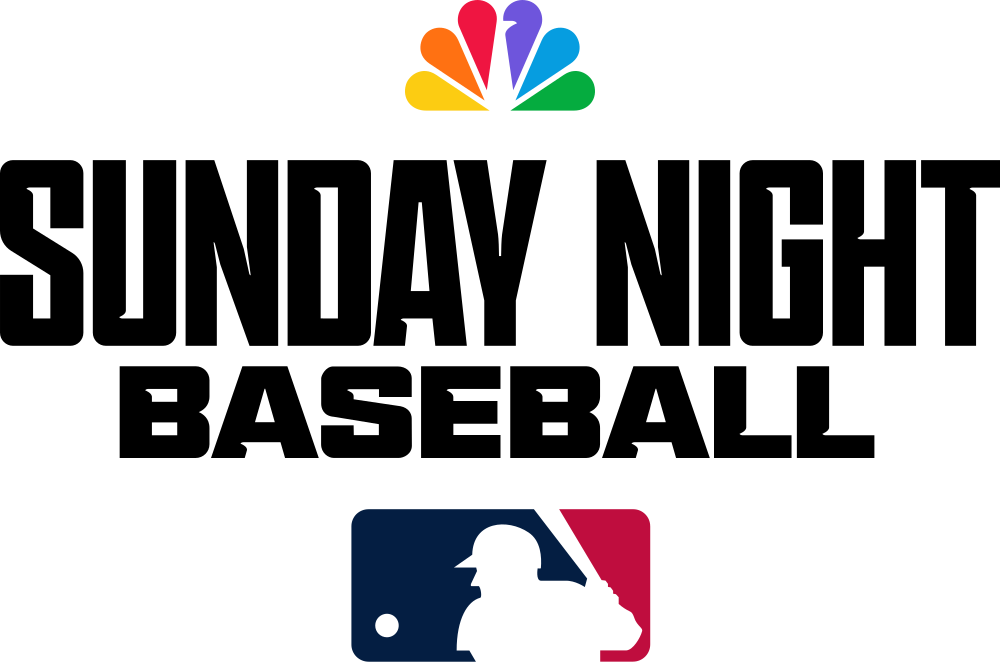
- Current SNB logo, in use since 2026
- Genre: American baseball game telecasts
- Directed by: Kaare Numme III
- Presented by: Jason Benetti; Bob Costas; Ahmed Fareed; Various commentators
- Opening theme: "Karn Evil 9" by Zac Brown Band (2026–present)
- Composers: Keith Emerson; Greg Lake; Peter Sinfield
- Country of origin: United States
- Original language: English
- No. of seasons: 37 (through 2026 season)

Production
- Executive producer: Sam Flood
- Producer: Matt Borzello
- Production locations: Various MLB stadiums (game telecasts); ESPN Headquarters; Bristol, Connecticut (2020)
- Camera setup: Multi-camera
- Running time: 210 minutes or until game ends (inc. adverts)
- Production companies: Major League Baseball; ESPN (1990–2025); NBC Sports (2026–present)

Original release
- Network: ESPN
- Release: April 15, 1990 – September 21, 2025
- Network: ABC (Note: Select telecasts)
- Release: August 8, 2021
- Network: ESPN2 (Note: for Alternate telecast of select Sunday Night Baseball games. Prior to 2022, ESPN2 served as a substitute channel for the package during conflicts with ESPN's other sports programs.)
- Release: May 29, 2022 – August 17, 2025
- Network: NBC; NBCSN; Peacock; Telemundo, TeleXitos and Universo (Spanish audio/broadcast)
- Release: March 29, 2026 – present

Related
- Major League Baseball on NBC; ESPN Major League Baseball; Major League Baseball on ABC; Baseball Tonight; Monday Night Baseball; Sunday Afternoon Baseball; MLB Sunday Leadoff; Wednesday Night Baseball; Major League Baseball on ESPN Radio

Sunday Night Baseball is an American weekly telecast of Major League Baseball (MLB) games on Sunday evenings. As of 2026, the games are broadcast on NBC and Peacock (with some games airing on Peacock and NBCSN due to schedule conflicts with Sunday Night Basketball and Sunday Night Football).

From 1990 to 2025, the games were exclusively aired nationally on ESPN. During the ESPN run, games were preceded most weeks by the studio show Baseball Tonight: Sunday Night Countdown prior to the first pitch. A few telecasts each season appeared on ESPN2 or ABC rather than ESPN due to conflicts with other programming. In 2022, ESPN2 began airing simultaneous broadcasts of the game with different commentators and themes including Statcast Edition with a focus on analytics and technical breakdowns and Kay Cast, a more casual format featuring celebrity guests doing interviews and providing commentary during the game.

== History ==
=== ESPN (1990–2025) ===
==== Jon Miller and Joe Morgan (1990–2010) ====
ESPN Sunday Night Baseball logo (2012–2017)

The series debuted on April 15, 1990 with coverage of New York Mets against the Montreal Expos in Montreal. From its inception through 2010, the series featured the broadcast team of play-by-play commentator Jon Miller and color commentator Joe Morgan. Steve Phillips joined them for the 2009 season, and Orel Hershiser did so for the 2010 season following Phillips' dismissal by the network.

From 2004 until 2006, Sam Ryan served as the field reporter, but she left to join New York City's WCBS-TV and CBS Sports in June 2006. On July 2, 2006, Bonnie Bernstein joined the crew as the new field reporter, but did not return in 2007 primarily due to her request to cut back her schedule because of her continued recovery from a bout with deep vein thrombosis in October 2006. Beginning in 2006, Peter Gammons joined the broadcasts as a field reporter in the scouts position. Gammons, however, suffered a brain aneurysm and didn't return until September 2006.

In 2010, Miller and Morgan began their 21st consecutive season working together for ESPN. Following the 2010 season, ESPN announced that the television contracts of Miller and Morgan would not be renewed. Miller was offered, but chose to decline, a continued role with ESPN Radio.

==== Dan Shulman (2011–2017) ====
Play-by-play announcer Dan Shulman joined color commentators Hershiser and Bobby Valentine as the new Sunday Night Baseball crew beginning in 2011. In an essential trade deal, following the hiring of Valentine as the Boston Red Sox manager, his predecessor Terry Francona was hired to join Shulman and Hershiser for the 2012 season. Francona stayed with ESPN for only one season before he was hired by the Cleveland Indians to be their manager for the 2013 season. Francona was replaced by John Kruk, who had been part of the Baseball Tonight team since 2004.

Like Miller and Morgan before them, Shulman and Hershiser also formed the lead team on ESPN Radio's World Series coverage. Prior to the 2014 season, Hershiser left ESPN to become an analyst for the Dodgers on SportsNet LA, and was replaced by Curt Schilling; however, Schilling's subsequent diagnosis of and treatment for an undisclosed form of cancer led to his being unavailable to ESPN for most of the season. Shulman and Kruk worked as a two-man booth until Schilling joined them in September.

On August 30, 2015, former softball player Jessica Mendoza joined the Sunday Night Baseball broadcast team as a color commentator. For the 2016 MLB season, former Yankees player Aaron Boone joined Shulman and Mendoza in the broadcast booth as the second color commentator for SNB. Shulman stepped down at the conclusion of the 2017 season, while Boone left the booth after being named new Yankees manager.

==== Matt Vasgersian and Alex Rodriguez (2018–2021) ====
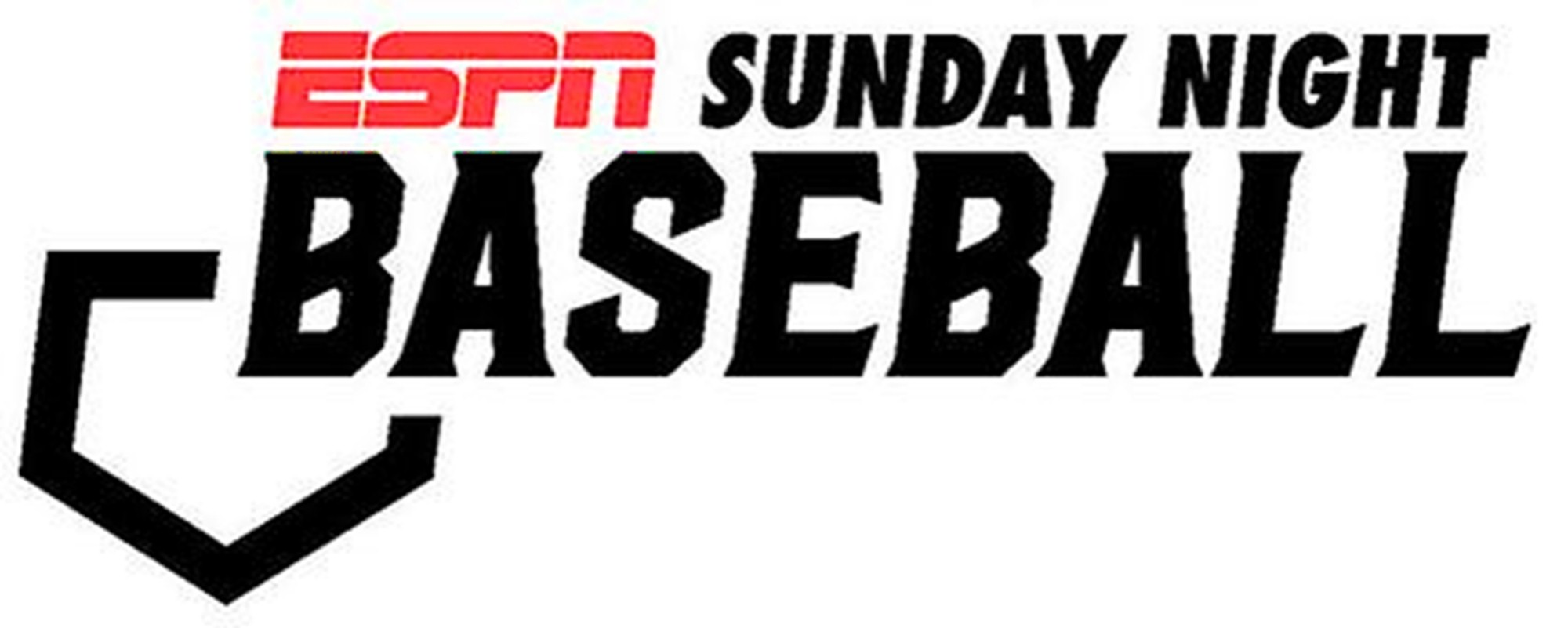
ESPN Sunday Night Baseball logo (2018–2025)

On January 23, 2018, ESPN announced that Alex Rodriguez and Matt Vasgersian would join Jessica Mendoza, Buster Olney, and the SNB team for the 2018 season as analyst and play-by-play respectively. For the 2020 season abbreviated due to the COVID-19 pandemic, Mendoza left SNB as part of her new deal with ESPN, leaving Vasgersian and Rodriguez, who broadcast all games from a studio at ESPN's Bristol, Connecticut headquarters.

ABC televised a Sunday Night Baseball matchup between the Chicago White Sox and the Chicago Cubs on August 8, 2021. The broadcast marked ABC's first broadcast of Sunday Night Baseball and the first regular season matchup it had broadcast since its involvement in the Baseball Network in 1995.

==== Ravech, Cone and Pérez (2022–2025) ====
In 2021, ESPN and Major League Baseball agreed to a new contract that would last through the 2028 season. Beginning in 2022, ESPN would keep Sunday Night Baseball as its Game of the Week broadcast, but would no longer televise non-exclusive weeknight games unlike in previous years. It also gave ESPN the option to produce an alternate telecast on its sister networks (such as the popular alternate "StatCast" seen on ESPN2), as well as simulcasts on ESPN+ and ABC.

Matt Vasgersian left ESPN after the 2021 season to focus more on his duties for MLB Network and Bally Sports West, as he is the lead announcer for the Los Angeles Angels, which in part, due to SNB, saw his role taken by Daron Sutton and Rich Waltz for most of the 2021 season. On January 7, 2022, ESPN announced that Karl Ravech would become the fourth play-by-play announcer for Sunday Night Baseball, joined by analysts David Cone and Eduardo Pérez.

On May 14, 2023, ESPN was widely criticized for its decision to implement a split screen between its coverage of Game 6 of the Stanley Cup Playoff Western Conference semifinal series between the Vegas Golden Knights and Edmonton Oilers and a Sunday Night Baseball telecast between the St. Louis Cardinals and Boston Red Sox, which was being played at the same time and was ultimately won by St. Louis by the score of 9–1.

Jon Sciambi, the lead voice for ESPN Radio's MLB coverage, filled in for Ravech when the latter was on assignment for ESPN, most notably during the Little League World Series.

In 2024, it was reported that ESPN was expected to opt out of its contract with MLB at the end of the 2025 season. On February 20, 2025, ESPN and MLB mutually opted out of their contract.

On September 21, 2025, ESPN broadcast its 865th and final Sunday Night Baseball game, which was between the Seattle Mariners and Houston Astros. ESPN subsequently signed a new contract with Major League Baseball, mainly broadcasting exclusive weekday games from 2026 onward.

On August 23, 2026, ESPN returned to the Sunday night slot for the MLB Little League Classic, but they no longer labeled them as Sunday Night Baseball broadcasts due to NBC fully taking over the rights. This was also Karl Ravech's last MLB broadcast for ESPN after he was laid off by the network in the summer.

===== KayRod Cast =====
Started in 2022, alternate telecasts of eight Sunday Night Baseball games aired on ESPN2 with Michael Kay and Alex Rodriguez calling the games. The presentation, nicknamed "KayRod Cast", was similar to the Monday Night Football "Manningcast" hosted by Peyton and Eli Manning. These altcasts ended when Rodriguez signed an exclusive deal with Fox Sports, and replaced with an updated StatCast alternate broadcast.

=== NBC (2026–present) ===
==== Jason Benetti and local color commentators (2026–present) ====
Prior to the 2025 season, ESPN and MLB mutually agreed to opt out of final three years of the Sunday Night Baseball contract, effective after the 2025 season. ESPN and MLB reportedly began negotiations on a new deal. In August 2025, it was reported that NBC would take the rights to air a Sunday night exclusive game for the 2026–2028 seasons, while ESPN would continue to air exclusive games during the season on different nights. On November 19, 2025, MLB announced that, alongside MLB Sunday Leadoff and the Wild Card games, NBC would indeed receive Sunday Night Baseball.

NBC Sports announced its inaugural Sunday Night Baseball on January 9, 2026. Sunday Night Baseball will air on NBCSN and Peacock from March 29 to May 24 (except April 12 and May 17, with the latter due to the NBA playoff game airing on Prime Video) and from September 6 to September 20. NBC will air Sunday Night Baseball from May 31 to August 16, along with April 12, May 17 and August 30. NBC will also air 3 p.m. Sunday afternoon games from August 23 to August 30. NBC will air a 1 p.m. Sunday afternoon game on September 6.

On January 22, 2026, veteran NBC Sports host Bob Costas announced that he would rejoin the network as a contributor for its MLB and NBA coverage, and serve as the studio host for Sunday Night Baseball. Costas had initially departed NBC in 2019, after which he became lead commentator for the MLB on TBS from 2021 to 2024.

On February 8, 2026, NBC Sports announced that Clayton Kershaw, Anthony Rizzo, and Joey Votto would work as studio game analysts throughout the regular and post seasons along with Ahmed Fareed also serving as studio pregame host.

On March 4, 2026, NBC Sports announced that Jason Benetti would return to NBC Sports and would work as the lead play-by-play for Sunday Night Baseball.

NBC missed the first hour of the Sunday night match-up between the Boston Red Sox and New York Yankees from Boston's Fenway Park on June 28, 2026 due to the network's coverage of Travelers Championship golf tournament running late following an almost 90 minute weather delay. To clarify, first pitch of the Red Sox-Yankees game on June 26, 2026 was at 7:20 p.m. Eastern Time. But NBC ultimately, didn’t finally pick up the coverage until approximately 8:28 p.m. By this point, the game was already in the bottom of the fourth inning. In the meantime, NBC forwarded the Sunday Night Baseball coverage to Peacock and NBCSN.

== Notable games aired on Sunday Night Baseball ==
=== 2000s ===
On May 28, 2000, Pedro Martínez and Roger Clemens faced off in an epic pitchers' duel at Yankee Stadium. Both pitchers threw complete games and combined for 22 strikeouts, 13 for Clemens, 9 for Martinez. The game was scoreless until Trot Nixon hit a two-run home run in the top of the ninth inning. Martinez then got the final three outs in the bottom of the inning to secure the victory.

ESPN broadcast the Cleveland Indians' historic comeback against the Seattle Mariners on August 5, 2001. The Indians trailed 14–2 after six innings, but scored twelve runs in the final three innings before winning in the bottom of the eleventh, 15–14. The twelve-run comeback tied the Major League record for largest deficit overcome in a game.

On September 2, 2001, Mike Mussina of the New York Yankees came within one strike of a perfect game against the Boston Red Sox. The effort was broken up on a single by Carl Everett, with Mussina settling for a one-hitter. The game itself was an exciting pitchers' duel, with the Red Sox' David Cone also shutting out the Yankees for eight innings, before allowing an RBI double by Enrique Wilson in the ninth. It was the only scoring of the Yankees' 1–0 win. Additionally, Cone was the most recent pitcher to record a perfect game having done so two years earlier as a Yankee against the Montreal Expos.

On June 16, 2002, Sunday Night Baseball covered a Subway Series at Shea Stadium in which Mo Vaughn hit a game winning three-run home run in the New York Mets' 3–2 win over the New York Yankees.

Rafael Furcal completed an unassisted triple play for the Atlanta Braves against the St. Louis Cardinals on August 10, 2003. It was the 12th such play in baseball history. In the fifth inning, the shortstop caught pitcher Woody Williams' liner with the runners moving in a hit and run attempt, stepped on second base to retire catcher Mike Matheny and tagged Orlando Palmeiro before he could return to first.

On April 22, 2007, the Red Sox became the fifth team in Major League history to hit four consecutive home runs, doing so in the third inning of a 7–6 victory over the Yankees.

On April 29, 2007, a canceled broadcast occurred between the Chicago Cubs and St. Louis Cardinals when Cardinals relief pitcher Josh Hancock was killed in a car accident earlier in the day while driving under the influence. In place of the game, special programming hosted by Miller and Morgan was shown.

On August 5, 2007, Tom Glavine of the New York Mets became the 23rd pitcher in history to record his 300th win. He did it in an 8–3 victory over the Chicago Cubs.

Sunday Night Baseball broadcast the Washington Nationals' first game at Nationals Park on March 30, 2008. The Nationals beat the Atlanta Braves, 3–2, on Ryan Zimmerman's walk-off home run in the bottom of the ninth. President George W. Bush, who threw out the ceremonial first pitch prior to the game, joined Jon Miller and Joe Morgan in the ESPN booth during the telecast.

The final game played at Yankee Stadium on September 21, 2008, pitting the New York Yankees against the Baltimore Orioles, was broadcast on Sunday Night Baseball.

Mariano Rivera's 500th career save (and also his 1st lifetime RBI) was broadcast on Sunday Night Baseball from Citi Field (home of the New York Mets).

=== 2010s ===
During the May 1, 2011, broadcast between the New York Mets and Philadelphia Phillies, ESPN announced the death of Osama bin Laden, the mastermind of the September 11 attacks, at the end of the 8th inning. At the top of the 9th inning with 1 out and Daniel Murphy at bat, fans at Citizens Bank Park erupted with U-S-A! chants despite the fact that no announcement of the news had been made in the stadium. Fans learned about the events through social media and mobile news apps. During the on-air announcement, Dan Shulman advised viewers to tune into their ABC stations for an address from President Barack Obama on the death of bin Laden.

The Chicago Cubs and the Mets at Citi Field on September 11, 2011, was broadcast on Sunday Night Baseball as part of the 10th anniversary of September 11, 2001; New York was targeted by the terrorists in the attacks of that day and the Mets hosted the first major professional sports event held in New York City since the attacks on September 21.

On July 3, 2016, Sunday Night Baseball aired the Fort Bragg Game, the first professional sporting event held on an active military base, and the first MLB regular season game held in North Carolina. The Miami Marlins defeated the Atlanta Braves, 5–2.

On May 7, 2017, during the game between the Chicago Cubs and the New York Yankees, they broke the MLB strikeout record as both teams combined made 48 strikeouts (Yankees 22 and Cubs 26). In addition, the 18-inning game was also the longest interleague game yet in MLB history and longest Sunday Night Baseball game yet broadcast. The Yankees won, 5–4.

=== 2020s ===
On August 8, 2021, the Sunday Night Baseball game between the Chicago White Sox and the Chicago Cubs aired exclusively on ABC. It was the first time since 1995 that a regular season Major League Baseball game aired on ABC. The White Sox won the game 9–3. This game saw a cameo appearance from former ABC baseball announcer Al Michaels, as well as a brief usage of The Baseball Network graphics.

== Commentators ==
=== Current (NBC: 2026–present) ===
A complete list of NBC commentators

==== Play-by-play commentators ====
- Jason Benetti: lead play-by-play (2026–present)
- Matt Vasgersian: secondary play-by-play (2026–present)
- Dave Flemming: secondary play-by-play (2026–present)

==== Field reporters ====
- John Fanta (primary)
- Caroline Pineda (secondary)
- Ashley ShahAhmadi (secondary)

==== Studio team ====
- Bob Costas: pregame on-site studio host (2026–present)
- Ahmed Fareed: pregame on–site studio host (2026–present)
- John Fanta: alternative pregame on–site studio host (2026–present)
- Adam Ottavino pregame studio analyst (2026–present)
- Dexter Fowler: pregame studio analyst (2026–present)
- Clayton Kershaw: pregame studio analyst (2026–present)
- Anthony Rizzo: pregame studio analyst (2026–present)
- Joey Votto: pregame studio analyst (2026–present)

=== Former (ESPN: 1990–2025) ===
A complete list of ESPN commentators

==== Play-by-play commentators ====
- Michael Kay: ESPN2 telecast play-by-play (2022–2023)
- Jon Miller: lead play-by-play (1990–2010)
- Karl Ravech: lead play-by-play (2022–2025)
- Jon Sciambi: fill-in play-by-play (2022–2025)
- Dan Shulman: lead play-by-play (2011–2017)
- Matt Vasgersian: lead play-by-play (2018–2021)

==== Color commentators ====
- Aaron Boone: color commentator (2016–2017)
- David Cone: color commentator (2022–2025)
- Terry Francona: color commentator (2012)
- Orel Hershiser: color commentator (2010–2013)
- John Kruk: lead color commentator (2013–2016)
- Jessica Mendoza: color commentator (2015–2017); co-lead color commentator (2018–2019)
- Joe Morgan: lead color commentator (1990–2010)
- Eduardo Pérez: color commentator (2022–2025)
- Steve Phillips: color commentator (2009)
- Alex Rodriguez: lead color commentator (2018–2021); ESPN2 telecast color commentator (2022–2023)
- Curt Schilling: color commentator (2014–2015)
- Bobby Valentine: color commentator (2011)

==== Field reporters ====
- Bonnie Bernstein: field reporter (July–September 2006)
- Peter Gammons: field analyst (2006–2008)
- Tim Kurkjian: fill-in field reporter (2022–2025)
- Álvaro Martín: field reporter (2000–2001)
- Wendi Nix: field reporter (2011)
- Buster Olney: field reporter (2011–2025)
- Sam Ryan: field reporter (2004–2006)

== Other networks ==
ESPN Domingo de Grandes Ligas (Major League Sunday) is also broadcast in Spanish on ESPN Deportes, with Ernesto Jerez on play-by-play and Luis Alfredo Alvarez as the color analyst. This version is also presented on the Spanish feed of ESPN Latin America. The Brazilian feed, in Portuguese, has Romulo Mendonça doing the play-by-play and Paulo Antunes as the analyst. They broadcast from ESPN Brasil studios in São Paulo.

ESPN Radio has aired a weekly Sunday Night Baseball broadcast since 1998. Currently, Jon Sciambi calls play-by-play of the games, with Chris Singleton serving as color analyst. Sciambi was preceded by Gary Thorne (2008–09), Dan Shulman (2002–07), and Charley Steiner (1998–2001), while Singleton was preceded by Dave Campbell (1999–2010) and Kevin Kennedy (1998). As of 2020, the reserves for Sciambi include Shulman and Roxy Bernstein. In Canada, this program airs on CJCL, the flagship sports radio station for Sportsnet. TUDN Radio also airs Sunday Night Baseball in Spanish, after the dissolution of ESPN Deportes Radio.

From 1990 to 1997, CBS Radio aired Sunday night games, usually with Jerry Coleman and John Rooney announcing.

Outside the US, this weekly game was also broadcast live on Five in the UK from 1997 until 2008 and at the time was the longest running programme on the channel. In Latin America the game is broadcast on ESPN Latin America. When the NFL season begins, the game is moved to ESPN Dos only for the audience in Mexico, Central America, Venezuela, Colombia and the Caribbean Islands.

In Canada, Sunday Night Baseball has aired on the TSN family of channels (usually on TSN2) since May 16, 2010. This was initially under a sublicensing agreement with Sportsnet, the primary Canadian rightsholder for Major League Baseball, in a deal through which TSN transferred its remaining rights to Toronto Blue Jays games to Sportsnet, which is now the exclusive carrier of Blue Jays games, and English-language rightsholder of all post-season games. Beginning in 2014, TSN has contracted directly with MLB for rights to SNB and other ESPN MLB telecasts through 2021. Sportsnet may still air individual games in the event of a scheduling conflict between all of TSN's channels. Previous carriers of Sunday Night Baseball were TSN (1990–2000), The Score (2001–2002), and Sportsnet (2003 – May 9, 2010). In French, the program is carried on Réseau des Sports with Alain Usereau and Marc Griffin working as the announcers.
