= George Vecsey =

American journalist (born 1939)

- Vecsey in 2016.
- Born: George Spencer Vecsey; July 4, 1939 (age 87); New York City, U.S.
- Education: Hofstra University
- Occupations: Journalist; sportswriter
- Years active: 1961–present
- Employer: The New York Times
- Spouse: Marianne Graham (m. 1960)
- Relatives: Peter Vecsey (brother)

George Spencer Vecsey (/ˈvɛsiː/ VES-ee; born July 4, 1939) is an American non-fiction author and sports columnist for The New York Times. Vecsey is best known for his work in sports, but has co-written several autobiographies with non-sports figures. He is also the older brother of fellow sports journalist, columnist, and former NBATV and NBA on NBC color commentator Peter Vecsey.

== Life and career ==
Vecsey was born on July 4, 1939, in the Jamaica neighborhood of Queens in New York City to George and May Vecsey. His father George had been adopted by a Hungarian-American family whose surname was anglicized from its original pronunciation of "VAY-chay."

Vecsey has written about such events as the FIFA World Cup and the Olympics and on a wide variety of sports including tennis, football, basketball, hockey, soccer, and boxing, but considers baseball, the sport he's covered since 1960, his favorite, and has written more books about it than any other sport.

He is the author of more than a dozen books, including Baseball: A History of America’s Favorite Game and Loretta Lynn: Coal Miner's Daughter (with American country singer Loretta Lynn), which was made into an Academy Award–winning film. Vecsey has also served as a national and religion reporter for The New York Times, interviewing the Dalai Lama, former British prime minister Tony Blair, American Christian evangelist Billy Graham, and a host of other noteworthy figures.

In addition to assisting Loretta Lynn, Vecsey has also helped several other celebrities and high-profile figures write their autobiographies, including American country singer Barbara Mandrell and Chinese human rights activist Harry Wu. His work in this field has ranged from co-writing credits, to being listed as a contributor (as in Lynn's Coal Miner's Daughter), to being listed as a consultant.

== Works ==
Vecsey's baseball books cover several different periods of the game. In The Rivals, he covers the entire history of the Red Sox–Yankees rivalry from the first half of the century up until recent years. He has also written books exclusively about modern baseball history such as McGwire and Sosa, about the home run record chase by Mark McGwire and Sammy Sosa that took place in 1998, and Subway 2000, about the New York Mets and New York Yankees Subway Series that took place in 2000.

Vecsey co-wrote Cy Young Award winner Bob Welch's 1991 autobiography, Five O'Clock Comes Early, chronicling Welch's rise to Major League Baseball stardom and his struggle against alcohol addiction.

Vecsey was one of 25 Newsday journalists who contributed to the literary hoax Naked Came the Stranger. He wrote the third chapter which was titled and about Morton Earbrow, the second character seduced by the protagonist. The Earbrow name was inspired by a Casey Stengel quote in which he said Gil Hodges was so strong that he could "squeeze your earbrows off."

His Baseball: A History of America's Favorite Game (Modern Library, 2006) is a concise history of the game of professional baseball.

In 2011, ESPN published Stan Musial: An American Life, Vecsey's biography of twenty-time All-Star and St. Louis Cardinals icon Stan Musial. Reviewing the book, George Will wrote, "At long last, George Vecsey has taken Musial's measure in this delightful biography of a man and a baseball era." Tim Kurkjian, Senior Writer for ESPN Magazine and analyst for ESPN's Baseball Tonight and SportsCenter, said that the book was "a fascinating and profound look at the most underrated great player of all time, and one of the true gentlemen of the game."

He was the 2013 recipient of the National Soccer Hall of Fame's Colin Jose Media Award. His book Eight World Cups: My Journey through the Beauty and Dark Side of Soccer was published in May, 2014.

== Personal life ==
Vecsey is the older brother of New York Post sports columnist Peter Vecsey and the father of Laura Vecsey, the Harrisburg Patriot-News political columnist; David Vecsey, a copy editor at The New York Times Magazine; and Corinna Vecsey Wilson, president of the consulting firm Wilson500, Inc.

Vecsey received a Bachelor of Arts degree from Hofstra University in 1960. He was awarded an honorary doctorate from Hofstra in 1990.

Unlike many other well-known sports columnists, Vecsey does not often appear on television.

Vecsey lives in Port Washington, New York, with his wife, Marianne, an artist.
