= Doris Burke =

American sports commentator

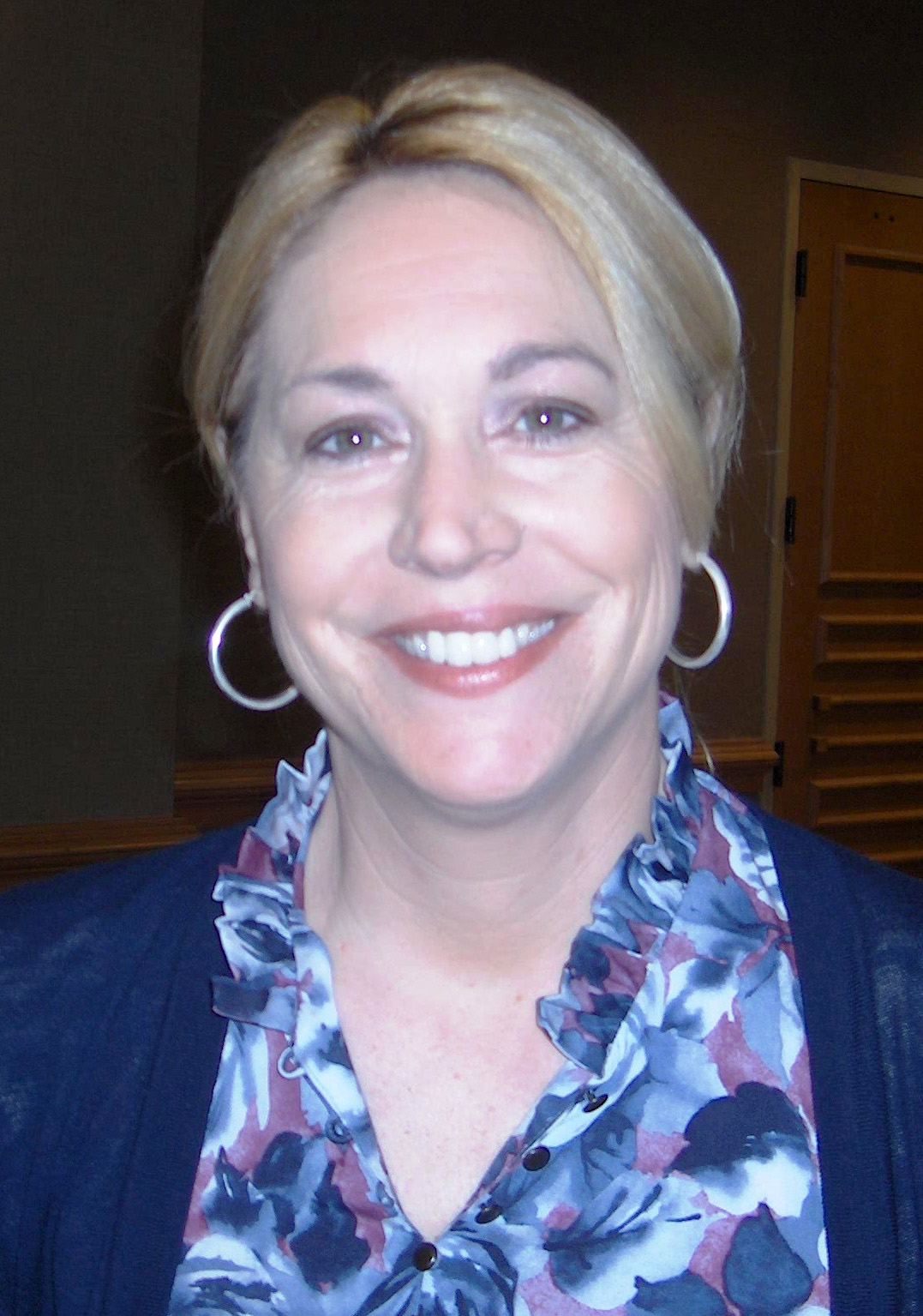
- Burke in 2011
- Born: Doris Sable; November 4, 1965 (age 61); West Islip, New York, U.S.
- Education: Providence College
- Occupations: Sports commentator; analyst
- Years active: 1990–present
- Spouse: Gregg Burke (divorced)
- Children: 2
- Awards: See below

Doris Burke (née Sable; born November 4, 1965) is an American sports announcer and analyst for NBA on ESPN, NBA on ABC, College Basketball on ESPN, and College Basketball on ABC games. She formerly worked as an analyst for WNBA games on MSG and has worked on New York Knicks games. Burke was the first female commentator to call a New York Knicks game on radio and television.

Burke played college basketball for the Providence Friars, finishing her career as the school's leader in assists. Honored for her pioneering work, Burke received the Curt Gowdy Media Award from the Basketball Hall of Fame in 2018.

In 2023, ESPN named Burke to its No. 1 NBA commentary team. She became the first woman to serve as a game analyst on television for a championship final (the 2024 NBA Finals) in one of the four major North American professional men's sports leagues.

== Early life ==
Doris Sable was born in West Islip, New York. At age seven, she moved to Manasquan, New Jersey, where she was raised. The youngest of eight children, Doris started playing basketball in the second grade. Her basketball idols growing up were Kyle Macy, Kelly Tripucka, and Tom Heinsohn.

Burke played as a point guard at Manasquan High School and was recruited by several eastern colleges.

== Career ==
=== College ===
Burke attended Providence College in Providence, Rhode Island. She competed as a member of the Providence Friars women's basketball team as the point guard for four years. Burke finished her career averaging 17.6 points and 7.2 assists per game.

During her freshman year, Burke led the Big East Conference in assists. She was twice named to both the All-Big East and Big East all-tournament teams, both in 1986 and 1987. As a senior in 1987, Burke was the college's Co-Female Athlete of the Year. She was also named an All-American in 1987.

Burke left Providence as its all-time leader in assists with 602, and as of 2012 was still second in that career category. She was inducted into the Providence College Hall of Fame in 1999, the fifth woman so honored.

At Providence, Burke earned a bachelor's degree in health service administration/social work and later a master's degree in education.

=== Broadcasting career ===
Burke began her broadcasting career in 1990 as an analyst for women's games for her alma mater on radio. The same year, she began working in that role for Big East women's games on television. In 1996, she began working Big East men's games.

Burke has been working for ESPN in various positions since 1991. She has been a part of ESPN's coverage of the WNBA. For many years, Burke was the primary radio and television voice of the New York Liberty. In 2003, she was named to ESPN's men's college basketball coverage, working with Dick Vitale, and began working the sidelines for ESPN and ABC for their coverage of the NBA beginning with the 2003–04 NBA season.

In 2000, Burke became the first woman to be a commentator for a New York Knicks game on radio and on television; she is also the first woman to be a commentator for a Big East men's game and the first woman to be the primary commentator on a men's college basketball conference package. From 2009 to 2019, Burke served as a sideline reporter for the NBA Finals on ABC. Until 2017, she worked as an analyst in select regular season and playoff games.

In 2010, Burke was featured as the new sideline reporter for 2K Sports's NBA 2K11 video game. She has appeared in each edition since.

In 2013, Burke signed a multi-year contract extension to serve as an NBA commentator for ESPN. On November 13, she debuted on ESPN's NBA pregame show NBA Countdown alongside analysts Jalen Rose and Avery Johnson.

In 2017, Burke became a regular NBA game analyst for ESPN, the first woman to be assigned a full regular-season role at the national level. She replaced Doug Collins, who left ESPN for a job with the Chicago Bulls, but continued sideline reporting for the conference finals and the NBA Finals until 2019. In 2020, Burke began calling the Conference Finals and the NBA Finals on ESPN Radio, making her the first woman to call the conference finals and NBA Finals on radio.

In August 2023, ESPN/ABC announced that Burke and former NBA coach Doc Rivers would join Mike Breen on its lead broadcasting team, replacing Jeff Van Gundy and Mark Jackson, whom the network laid off earlier that year. Burke is the first woman to serve as a television analyst for a major American men's championship and the first woman TV analyst for the NBA Conference Finals and the NBA Finals. (Note: Burke previously called Game 1 of the 2020 Eastern Conference Finals on TV with Mark Jones, in lieu of Breen, Jeff Van Gundy, and Mark Jackson, who were in charge for Game 7 of the 2020 Western Conference Semifinals series between the Los Angeles Clippers and the Denver Nuggets. As a result, this will officially mark the first time she will call the Conference Finals and the NBA Finals on television.)

== Personal life ==
Burke is divorced from Gregg Burke (head golf coach at University of Rhode Island), with whom she has two children.

== Awards and honors ==
In 1999, Burke was inducted into the Providence College Hall of Fame. In 2003, she received the USA Today Rudy Award as the Best New Face in Sports Television. In 2004, Burke was inducted into the Institute for International Sport's Scholar Athlete Hall of Fame. In 2005, Providence College awarded her an honorary doctorate degree. In 2006, Burke was inducted into the New England Basketball Hall of Fame and the North Providence Hall of Fame.

In 2012, Burke received the Silver Anniversary Award in recognition of her athletic and professional accomplishments from the NCAA. Also in 2012, she called the Big East tournament and was a reporter during the championship game. Honored for her pioneering work, Burke was selected by the Basketball Hall of Fame as the 2018 Curt Gowdy Media Award winner. For their first match of March 2019, the women of the United States women's national soccer team each wore a jersey with the name of a woman they were honoring on the back; Tobin Heath chose Burke.
