= Leonardo Montero =

Argentine television host

Leonardo Montero is an Argentine television host.

== Awards ==
=== Nominations ===
- 2013 Martín Fierro Awards
  - Best male TV host (for Am, Antes del Mediodía)
