= María Pía Shaw =

Argentine journalist

María Pía Shaw is an Argentine journalist.

== Awards and nominations ==
- 2013 Martín Fierro Awards, nomination for Best News Reporter
