= Joe McConnell =

American sportscaster

- Born: March 10, 1939; Rochester, Indiana, U.S.
- Died: April 8, 2018 (aged 79); Indianapolis, Indiana, U.S.
- Occupation: Sports announcer

Joseph Fredrick McConnell (March 10, 1939 – April 8, 2018) was an American sports announcer.

== Early life and career ==
McConnell was born in Rochester, Indiana, and grew up in Goodland, Indiana. He was a 1962 graduate of Franklin College, and his broadcasting career began in 1962 at Purdue's campus radio station, WBAA. McConnell served as assistant sports information director at Purdue from 1965 to 1967.

== Broadcasting experience ==
McConnell's experience includes 23 seasons in the National Football League as the voice of the Denver Broncos (1969), Minnesota Vikings (1971–76 and 1985–87), Chicago Bears (1977–84), Indianapolis Colts (1992–94) and Tennessee Oilers (1997–98); seven seasons in the National Basketball Association as the voice of the Phoenix Suns (1970–72) and Indiana Pacers (1972–77); and seven seasons in Major League Baseball as the voice of the Minnesota Twins (1978–79) and Chicago White Sox (1980–84). McConnell also spent five seasons (1991–95) as lead voice for the NBA Radio Network.

He broadcast three Super Bowls, the National Basketball Association and American Basketball Association championships, the NBA All-Star Game and the American League Championship Series. Additionally, McConnell broadcast Northwestern football (1988) and Indiana State (1978–79), DePaul (1984–88), Illinois (1987–88), Notre Dame (1987–88) and Northwestern men's basketball (1989–94).

Joe McConnell had most recently served for 15 seasons as play-by-play announcer for Purdue football, from 1995 to 2009.

== Awards and honors ==
He was honored with the AP/UPI Play-by-Play Sportscaster of the Year Award five times and was the Indiana Sportscaster of the Year in 2000 and the Illinois Sportscaster of the Year in 1981.

In 2006, he received a nomination for the National Football Foundation's Chris Schenkel Award, presented to a college football broadcaster. Upon his retirement, at halftime of his final broadcast of the game between Purdue and Indiana University on November 21, 2009, he was awarded the Sagamore of the Wabash, the highest award that the Indiana governor can bestow, award by Governor Mitch Daniels.

In 2017, McConnell's was elected to the Indiana Broadcast Pioneers Hall of Fame.

== Death and legacy ==
McConnell died on April 8, 2018, in Indianapolis, Indiana, at age 79.

Upon his retirement as the voice of the Boilermakers, Purdue Athletics named the visiting team radio booth at Ross-Ade Stadium for McConnell.

Preceded by Fred Manfra	National radio play-by-play announcer, NBA Finals; 1991–1995	Succeeded by Brent Musburger
