= Jim Durham =

American sportscaster (1947–2012)

- Born: February 12, 1947; Chicago, Illinois, U.S.
- Died: November 4, 2012 (aged 65)
- Education: Donovan High School; Illinois State University
- Occupation: Sportscaster

Jim Durham (February 12, 1947 – November 4, 2012) was an American sportscaster.

== Early life and education ==
Born in Chicago, he graduated from Donovan High School in Donovan, Illinois, and later attended Illinois State University in Normal, Illinois.

== Career ==
Durham spent more than 37 years calling NBA games on TV and radio; his previous assignments were with the Chicago Bulls, the Dallas Mavericks, TNT and TBS. With the Bulls, he was the play-by-play announcer when Michael Jordan, Scottie Pippen, and their teammates won the 1991 NBA championship. In 1998, Durham called men's NCAA basketball tournament games for CBS.

=== Early career ===
Early in his career, Durham worked on WJBC radio in Bloomington, Illinois. During his time there, he covered the career of Illinois State University basketball star Doug Collins, later coincidentally the coach of the Bulls during the early Jordan years in Chicago, including the famous call listed below.

=== NBA career ===
Durham was the play-by-play voice of the Chicago Bulls from 1973 to 1991. During his first twelve years covering the ballclub, he was exclusively on the radio broadcasts on WIND (1973–1980, 1982–1985), WVON (1980–1982) and WGCI-FM (1981–1982; shared arrangement with WVON). Primarily working solo, he was paired with Norm Van Lier in 1980–81 and Dave Baum in 1982–83. For the remainder of his time in Chicago beginning with the 1985–86 season, he and Johnny Kerr handled the simulcast on WMAQ (1985–1988) and WLUP (1988–1991) on the radio and WFLD/SportsVision (1985–1989) and WGN/SportsChannel Chicago (1989–1991) on television. Five weeks after being relegated back to radio only on May 29, 1991, Durham was dismissed on July 3 as a result of a contract dispute with Bulls management. He was succeeded by Wayne Larrivee (WGN) and Tom Dore (SportsChannel) on television and Neil Funk on the radio.

Starting in 1995, he called numerous National Basketball Association games for ESPN and ESPN Radio.

==== The Shot ====
Durham's most memorable call was for "The Shot" made by Michael Jordan in Game 5 of the 1989 Eastern Conference First Round between the Bulls and Cavs:

The inbounds pass comes in to Jordan. Here's Michael at the foul line, the shot on Ehlo...GOOD! (Johnny 'Red" Kerr: THE BULLS WIN! THEY WIN!) They upset the Cleveland Cavaliers! Michael Jordan hits it at the foul line! (Kerr: WOOOH!) 101-100! 20,273 in stunned silence here in the Coliseum. Michael Jordan with 44 points in a game hit the shot over Craig Ehlo. What tremendous heroics we have had in Game 5. From both teams, what a spectacular series this has been. In my days in the NBA, 16 years, this is the greatest series I've ever seen!

=== Major League Baseball ===
Durham also did play-by-play for Major League Baseball, first in the 1980s for the Houston Astros, then from 1989–1990 for the Chicago White Sox and for ESPN Radio from 1998 until his death in 2012.

=== Death ===
Durham died on November 4, 2012, due to complications from a heart attack.

Preceded by Brent Musburger; Mike Tirico	National radio play-by-play announcer, NBA Finals; 2005–2006; 2010; 2012	Succeeded by Mike Tirico
