= Ernesto Jerez =

Dominican sportscaster (born 1967)

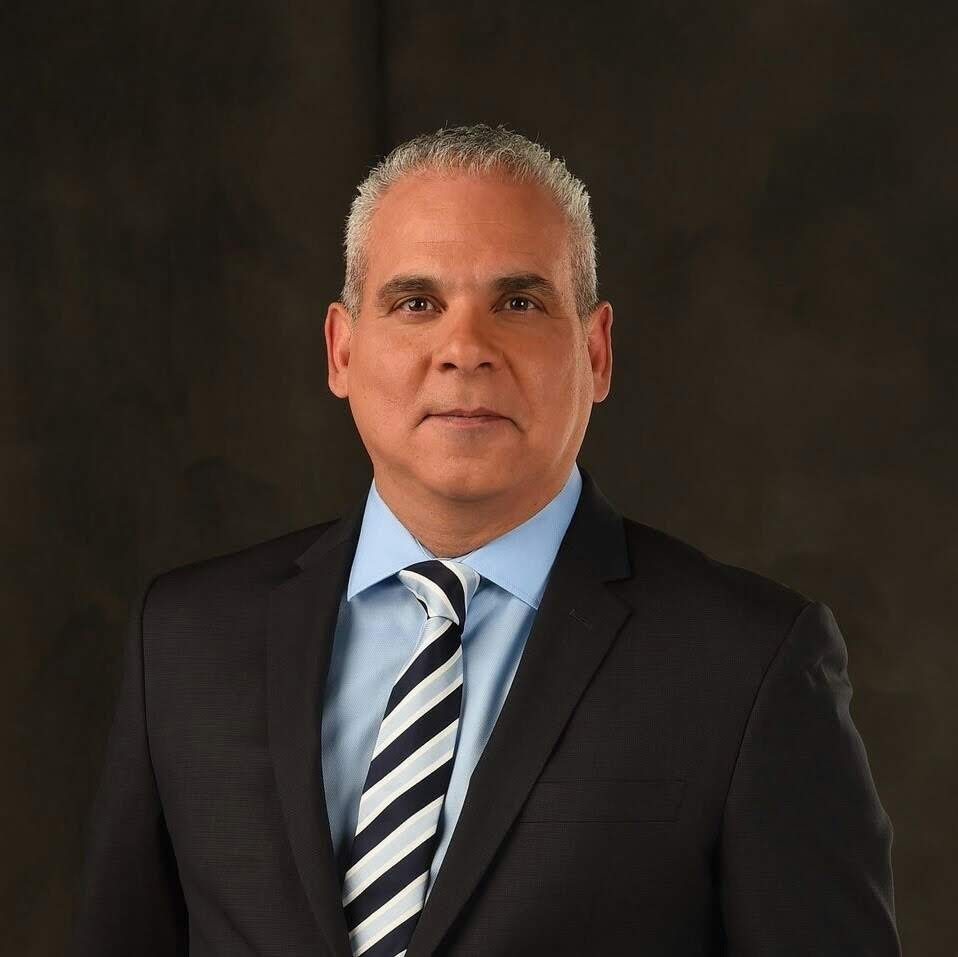
- Born: Ernesto Antonio Jerez Bueno; 9 December 1967 (age 58); Santiago de los Caballeros, Dominican Republic
- Occupation: Sportscaster
- Spouse: Virginia Valverde
- Children: 3

Ernesto Jerez (born December 9, 1967) is a Dominican sportscaster and commentator for ESPN Deportes.

== Biography ==
His parents are Angel Alejandro Jerez Matos, and Dulce María Bueno Núñez. He is the third child of the Jerez Bueno family, which includes Miguel Angel, Alexandra, and Dulce. He has three children, Daniela, Javier, and Virginia Maria.

== Career ==
He attended high school at Instituto Evangélico in his native Santiago, then participated in the AFS Exchange Student Program. He earned a Bachelor of Arts in business at the Pontificia Universidad Católica Madre y Maestra in Santiago, Dominican Republic, in 1991. He also graduated in broadcast journalism at the Northeast Broadcast School in Boston in 1995.

He announced the programming schedule on commercials on the Discovery Channel Latin America, a sister channel of the Discovery Channel.

He was hired by ESPN Latin America in 1995 for SportsCenter International, with Michele LaFountain, a back-then half-hour mutation of ESPN USA's SportsCenter.

Jerez became famous by narrating ESPN Latin America's retransmissions of ESPN USA's ESPN Wednesday Night Baseball and Sunday Night Baseball with the home run catchphrase "Sólido, hacia el jardin (izquierdo, central o derecho), a lo profundoooo... y ¡no... nono, nono, no...! ¡Díganle que no a esa pelota!" This phrase is also played on highlight reels of the U.S. version of SportsCenter, e.g. the highlights of the Home Run Derby with Sammy Sosa.

He has also narrated ESPN Latin America's retransmissions of the NBA on NBC, NBA on TNT, and NBA on ABC.
