= NBA on ESPN Radio =

- Genre: National Basketball Association
- Running time: 150 minutes (approximate)
- Country of origin: (United States) USA
- Home station: ESPN Radio (1996–)
- Starring: Adam Amin; Jon Barry; Hubie Brown; P.J. Carlesimo; Sean Kelley; Marc Kestecher; Kara Lawson
- Original release: January 21, 1996 – present

The NBA on ESPN Radio is a broadcast of National Basketball Association (NBA) games on the ESPN Radio network. The program began on January 21, 1996, while the contracts runs through the same timeframe as its television counterpart.

== Coverage overview ==
The NBA on ESPN Radio broadcasts games on a weekly basis, many more than once. Game coverage includes:

- Mid-season weeknight games, with varying days on a week-by-week basis
- NBA Cup games, including select group stage games, the semi-finals and the final
- Christmas double header games
- NBA Saturday Primetime games
- Select Sunday Night Basketball games
- Martin Luther King Jr. Day games (varies by year)
- NBA All-Star Weekend festivities, including the All-Star Game
- Select postseason games, including all of the NBA Finals

== Commentators ==
Currently, the lead commentary team for the NBA on ESPN Radio is Marc Kestecher and Jon Barry, with occasional contributions provided by P. J. Carlesimo, Rosalyn Gold-Onwude, Cory Alexander and Kelenna Azubuike as analysts along with Sean Kelley or Mike Couzens for play-by-play. Past contributors to the NBA on ESPN Radio have included Jim Durham, Kevin Calabro, Brent Musburger, Mike Tirico, Dave Pasch, Dave Flemming, Doug Brown, Tim Legler, Howard David, Dr. Jack Ramsay, Will Perdue, Doris Burke, and Hubie Brown.

== Availability ==
As of 2022, the NBA on ESPN Radio is part of ESPN Radio's main lineup, instead of in an opt-in/opt-out basis by ESPN Radio affiliates like in previous years (although affiliates retain the ability to opt out of broadcasts involving their in-market teams). It is also available in several regions outside the U.S. It can also be heard on SiriusXM satellite radio.

Most NBA on ESPN Radio games can be heard on mobile devices and connected televisions via the ESPN app as well as many other radio apps, including TuneIn and iHeartRadio (mostly from ESPN Radio affiliates streaming on iHeartRadio).

Preceded by NBA Radio	National radio broadcaster, NBA; 1996–present	Succeeded by Incumbent
