= Álvaro Martín (sports announcer) =

Puerto Rican commentator

Álvaro Martín is a Puerto Rican commentator who used to work for ESPN Deportes. He currently works for the NBA League Pass service and Prime Video where he provides play-by-play usually accompanied by former basketball coach Carlos Morales, who has worked with him since he was at ESPN.

After graduating from Colegio San Ignacio de Loyola in Puerto Rico, Martín received an undergraduate degree from Harvard University, and graduated with an MS in business administration from Harvard Business School.

He began work in 1991 at ESPN. His commentary duties include the NFL and NBA.

He provided voice commentary in the Spanish-language versions of the video games Madden NFL 08 and Madden NFL 09.
