= Peter Vecsey (sports columnist) =

American sports columnist (born 1943)

- Born: Peter Vecsey; July 1, 1943 (age 83); New York City, U.S.
- Occupations: Journalist; sportswriter
- Years active: 1960s–present
- Employer(s): The New York Post, NBA TV
- Spouse: Joan Misciagna (m. 1979)
- Relatives: George Vecsey (brother)
- Awards: Curt Gowdy Media Award (2009)

Peter Vecsey (born July 1, 1943) is an American sports columnist and analyst, specializing in basketball.

== Early life ==
Vecsey attended Archbishop Molloy High School, in Queens, New York, graduating in 1961. In the 1960s, he served in the United States Army Special Forces.

== Career ==
For many years, Vecsey wrote a column on the NBA for the New York Post. He was formerly an analyst for TBS and NBC and is currently an analyst for NBA TV.

His writing style has been described as vicious, combative and containing cruel wit.

Vecsey's column in the New York Post frequently detailed behind the scenes trade maneuvers as well as spotlighting many rumors in the NBA.

Vecsey is also known for his open criticism of players. Common targets include Charles Barkley, Danny Fortson, Danny Ainge, Byron Scott, the New Jersey Nets, Larry Brown, Alonzo Mourning, the Los Angeles Clippers, the New York Knicks, the Cleveland Cavaliers, Vin Baker, Shawn Kemp, and former Nets star Jayson Williams. He gave number one draft pick Joe Barry Carroll the nickname 'Joe Barely Cares', as well as dubbing former 1980s Knicks player Larry Demic 'EpiDemic' after he failed to live up to expectations.

== Awards and honors ==
He received the Basketball Hall of Fame's Curt Gowdy Media Award in 2009.

== Personal life ==
Vecsey is the younger brother of The New York Times sports columnist George Vecsey. He married Joan Misciagna in 1979 and they have two children.
