= Neil Funk =

American television play-by-play announcer

- Born: December 29, 1946 (age 79)
- Education: Syracuse University
- Occupation: Announcer
- Employer(s): National Basketball Association, Chicago Bulls
- Spouse: Renee Funk
- Children: 1

Neil Funk (born December 29, 1946) is the former television play-by-play announcer for the National Basketball Association's Chicago Bulls.

== Education and career ==
Funk grew up in Indianapolis and attended Syracuse University, graduating in 1969. His first broadcasting job was covering high school and college sports for a small radio station in Danville, Illinois. He quickly moved up the ranks to acquire a job with the Philadelphia 76ers' WIBG-radio broadcasting crew in 1976. After time broadcasting for the Kansas City Kings, Funk began doing television broadcasts for the Sixers in 1982. Partnering with Steve Mix, he won an Emmy Award in 1989.

Funk joined the Chicago Bulls as a radio play-by-play announcer in 1991. On May 6, 2008, it was announced that Funk would replace Tom Dore (Comcast SportsNet Chicago) and Wayne Larrivee (WGN-TV) as the play-by-play man for Chicago Bulls games on television.

In October 2019, it was announced that Funk would retire after the 2019–20 season, his 29th with the team.

However amid the suspension of the 2019-20 NBA season due to the COVID-19 pandemic, his final farewell (where the Bulls were supposed to end their regular season by playing the Boston Celtics on April 15) was later scrapped with the March 10 game (where the Bulls beat the Cleveland Cavaliers 108-103) becoming his final overall call.

On June 1, 2020, Adam Amin would later succeed Funk as the TV play-by-play broadcaster for the Bulls on NBC Sports Chicago, starting with the 2020–2021 season.

== Quotes ==
Funk is known for using his signature phrase "Ka-Boom!" whenever a Bulls player hits a three-point shot. He is also well known for his dramatic call "Bang, down the well it goes!"

A typical sampling of Funk's play-by-play call: "Dennis inbounds to Scottie, who brings the ball up. Pippen across the timeline with Stockton on him. Scottie left side for Michael. Michael backing Russell, backing, backing now swings it down to Luc. Over to Scottie with 10 on the 24. Scottie to Steve Kerr for three—ka-boom!"

Funk once said while announcing a Sixers game “Cheeks to Barkley Barkley back to Cheeks. Cheeks-twisting, turning, wheeling, dealing, hanging, firing, scoring.”

== Other activities ==
Funk was featured as the play-by-play announcer for the 1996 Midway Games arcade game NBA Hangtime, in place of Midway's usual sports announcer Tim Kitzrow. Among many NBA players of the time and members of the game's development team, Funk is accessible as a hidden character by using the name NFUNK along with pin 0101.

== Personal life ==
Funk is married to his wife Renee and has one son named William. He currently lives in Chicago.
