= Tony Roberts (sportscaster) =

American sportscaster (1928–2023)

- Born: John Robert Baffa; October 21, 1928; Chicago, Illinois, U.S.
- Died: August 25, 2023 (aged 94); Gainesville, Virginia, U.S.
- Occupation: Sportscaster
- Years active: 1980–2006
- Employer: Westwood One (until 2006)

John Robert Baffa (October 21, 1928 – August 25, 2023), known as Tony Roberts, was an American sportscaster who was the play-by-play announcer for the Notre Dame Fighting Irish football team from 1980 until 2006. He is a member of the Indiana Broadcasters Hall of Fame, Holiday Bowl Hall of Fame and College Football Hall of Fame. In 2005, he won the Chris Schenkel Award. In 2006, he was replaced by Don Criqui as play-by-play announcer for Notre Dame.

Baffa was born in Chicago on October 21, 1928, and graduated from Columbia College with a degree in journalism. After adopting the on-air name Tony Roberts to appease station managers seeking a more "American" name, he began his career working for radio stations in Iowa, Indiana and Washington, D.C. He replaced Shelby Whitfield as a Senators radio broadcaster alongside Ron Menchine on WWDC-AM 1260 for the franchise's final season in Washington, D.C. He has also worked covering the NFL, MLB, NBA, golf, and the Olympic Games. Roberts was inducted into the National Radio Hall of Fame in 2016.

== Death ==
Tony Roberts died at his home in Gainesville, Virginia, on August 25, 2023, at the age of 94.
