= Three-Point Contest =

Basketball event during NBA All-Star weekend

- Sport: Basketball
- Competition: National Basketball Association
- Discipline: Three-point shooting
- Sponsored by: State Farm

History
- First award: Larry Bird, 1986
- Most wins: 3 times: Larry Bird; Craig Hodges; Damian Lillard
- Most recent: Damian Lillard, 2026
- Website: State Farm 3-Point Contest

The Three-Point Contest is a National Basketball Association (NBA) contest held on the Saturday before the annual All-Star Game as part of All-Star weekend. The contest was originally named the "Long Distance Shootout".

The 2019 iteration of the contest featured ten participants. From its introduction in 1986 to 2018, eight participants were selected to participate in each season's shootout. Between 2002 and 2003, and again between 2012 and 2013, there were six participants. Damian Lillard of the Portland Trail Blazers is the most recent winner of the event, which was held at Intuit Dome in Los Angeles.

== Rules ==
In this contest, participants attempt to make as many three-point field goals as possible from five positions behind the three-point line in one minute. Players begin shooting from one corner of the court, and move from station to station along the three-point arc until they reach the other corner. At each shooting station is a rack with five basketballs. Out of the five balls, four are worth one point (the standard orange Wilson game balls) and the fifth one (a red/white/blue ABA-style ball; often nicknamed the "money ball") is worth two points. The goal of this contest is to score as many points as possible within one minute. A perfect score used to be 30 points. Since the 2014 contest, a rack consisting only of "money balls" has been added, and can be placed on any of the 5 spots of the player's choice, bringing up the maximum possible score to 34 points. In the 2020 contest, two additional shots were placed on each side of the top of the key, worth three points each. This increased the maximum possible score to 40, and the time limit was increased from 60 to 70 seconds.

In the qualifying round, each player has a chance to score as many points as possible. The three players with the top scores advance to the finals. The final round is played in the same way as the qualifying round, but players shoot according to the ascending order of their first-round scores. In each round, the shots and the score are confirmed by the referee and the television instant replay system. The final round will be shot in reverse direction (left to right corner for a left-handed shooter and vice versa). In the case of a tie, multiple extra rounds of 30 seconds (1 minute in the final) are played to determine the winner.

== Milestones ==
- Larry Bird, the inaugural winner of this contest, Craig Hodges and Damian Lillard (incumbent) have each won three times, while Mark Price, Jeff Hornacek, Peja Stojaković, Jason Kapono, and Stephen Curry have each won twice.
- Kon Knueppel of the Charlotte Hornets is the most recent rookie to be invited to the contest.
- Craig Hodges and Jason Kapono hold the record for most shots made in one round (21/25, .840 percentage), Craig Hodges also holds the records of most consecutive shots made (19), most appearances (8), and most points (25 out of a possible 30 points, .833 percentage)
- The current record for the most points scored by a single contestant is 31 points, which was achieved by Stephen Curry in 2021, Tyrese Haliburton in 2023, and Buddy Hield in 2025.
- Detlef Schrempf and Michael Jordan share the record for the fewest points scored in any round with five in 1988 and 1990, respectively.
- Kyrie Irving is the youngest player to win the contest at the age of 20.
- Rimas Kurtinaitis is the only non-NBA player to participate in the contest.
- Dirk Nowitzki and Karl-Anthony Towns are the only 7-foot players to win the contest.
- Damian Lillard is the most recent player with consecutive titles.

== Winners ==
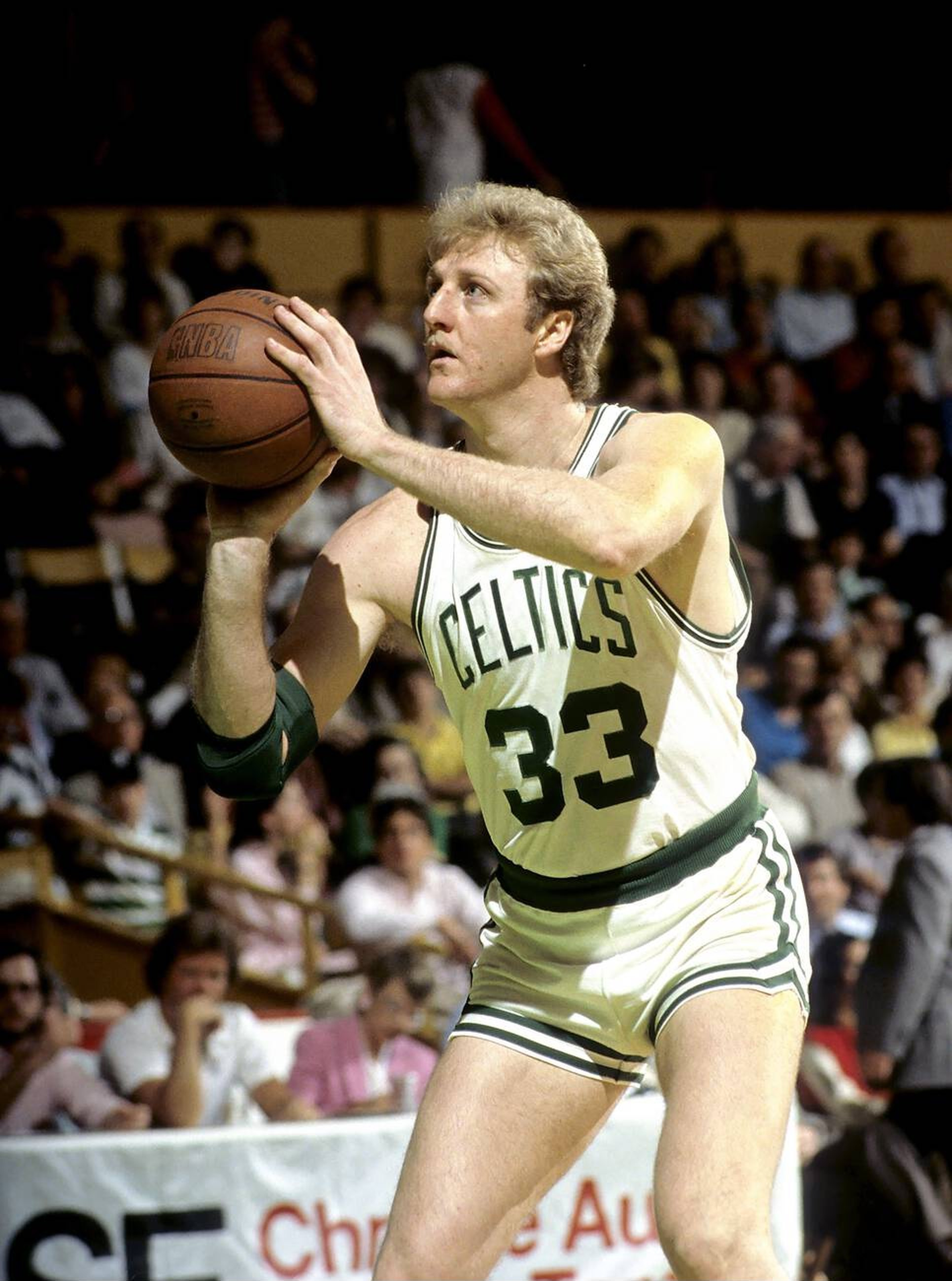
Larry Bird of the Boston Celtics won in the first three years of the contest's history.

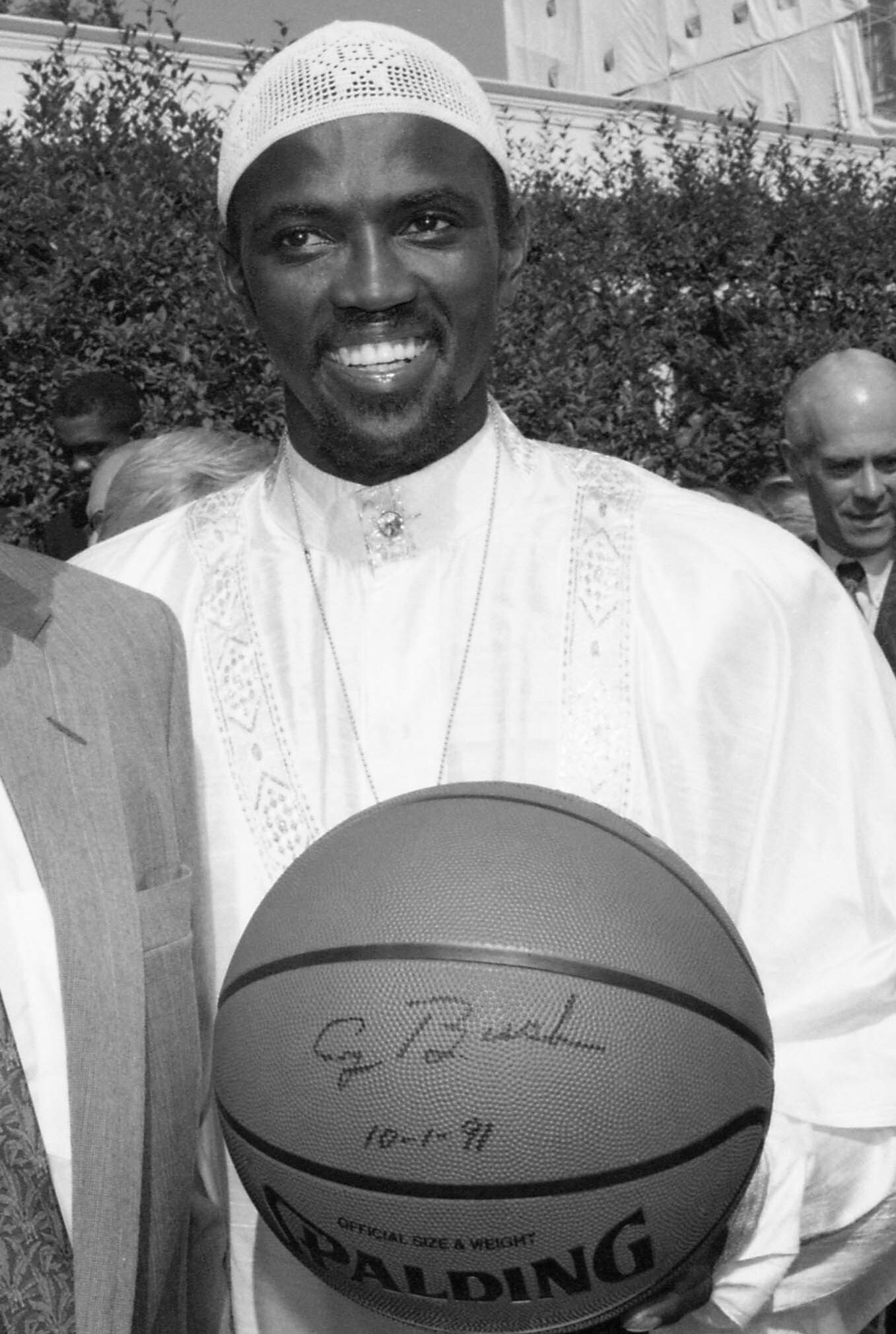
Craig Hodges of the Chicago Bulls won in three consecutive years from 1990 to 1992.

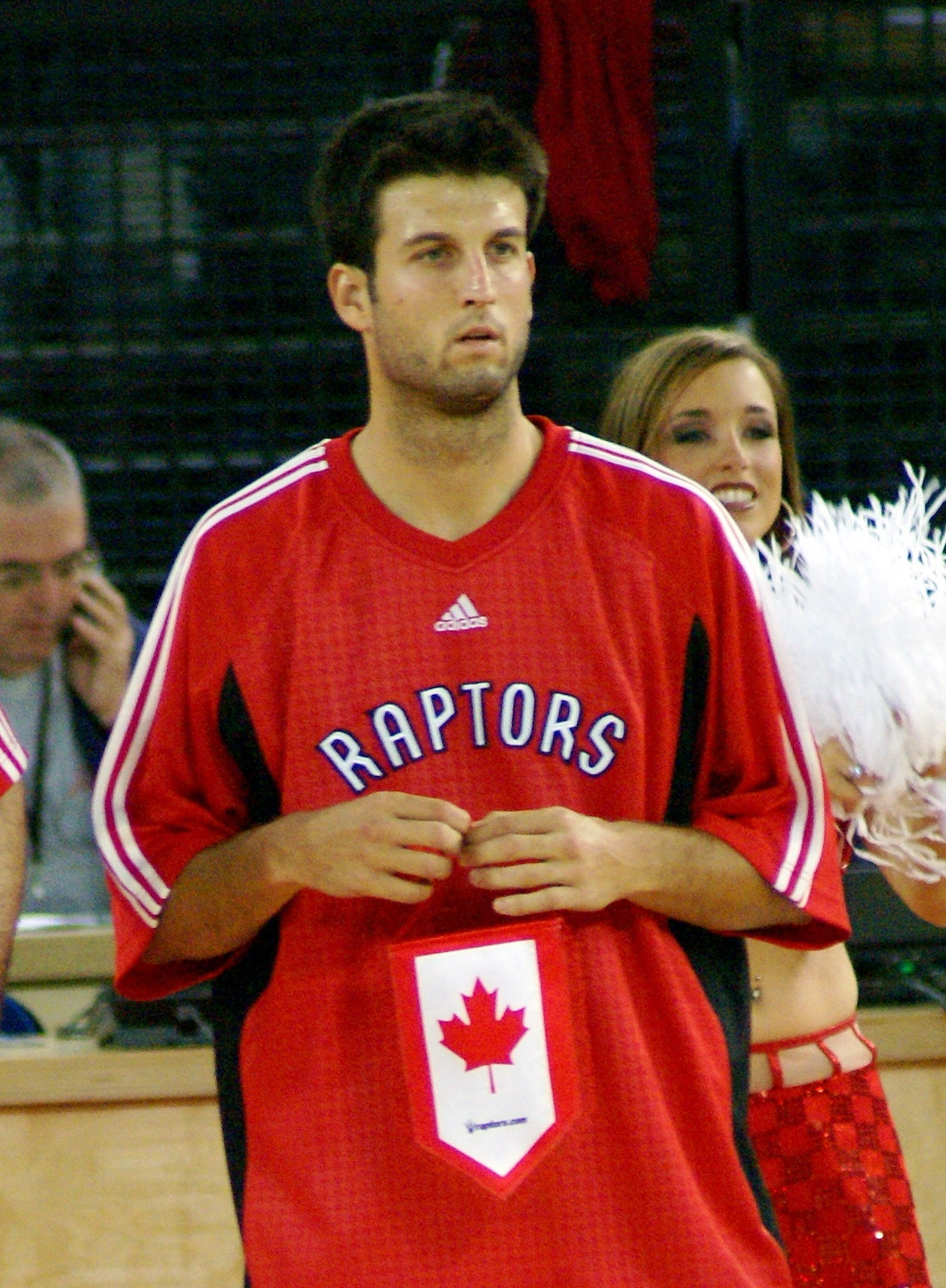
Two-time winner Jason Kapono recorded the highest percentage in the final round among winners at .833 in 2008.

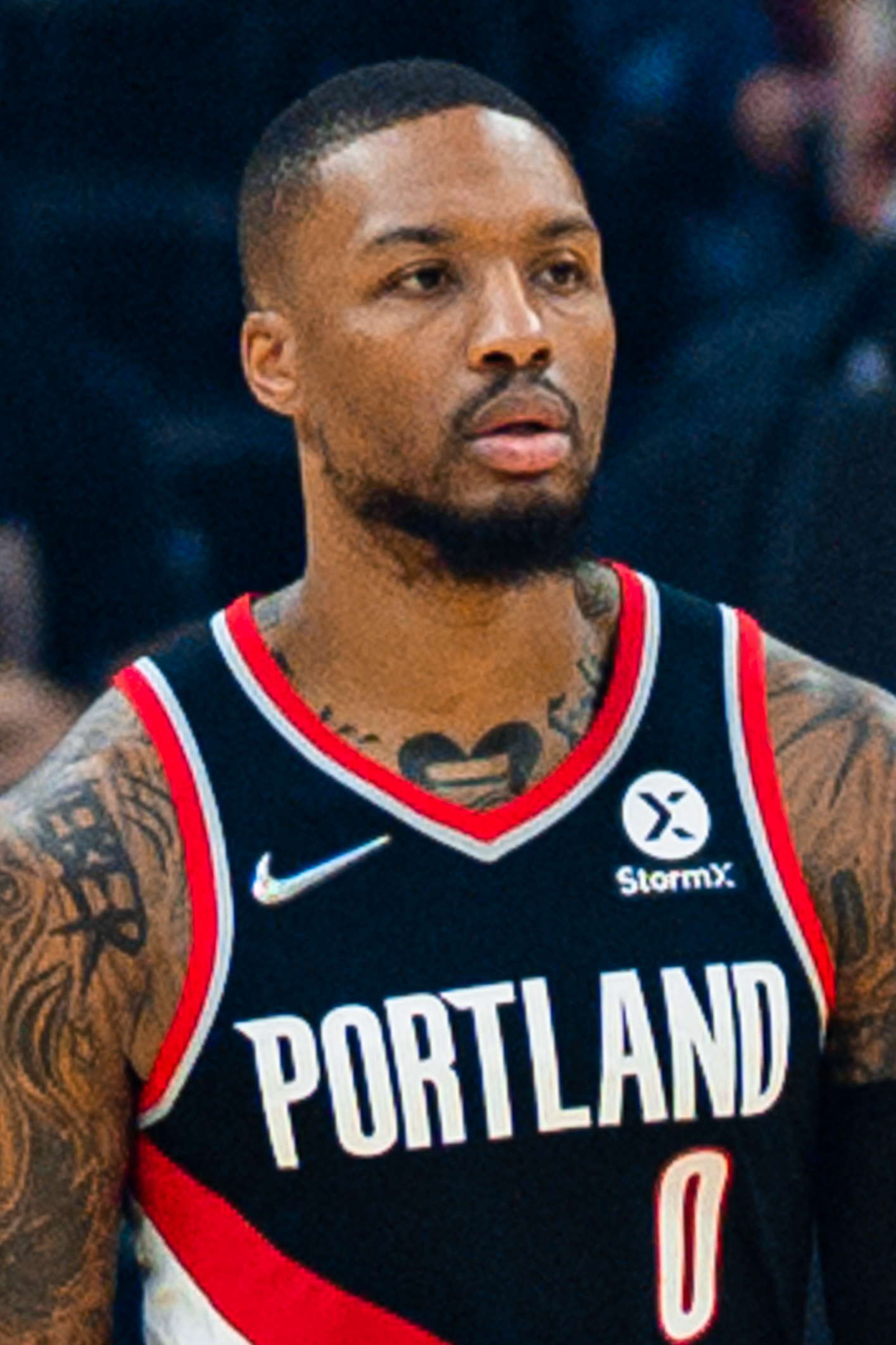
Damian Lillard became the third three-time winner after winning three times in 2023, 2024, and 2026.

	Active NBA player
	Inducted into the Naismith Memorial Basketball Hall of Fame
	Denotes the tiebreaker score from the final round
Player (#)	Denotes the number of times the player has won
Team (#)	Denotes the number of times a player from this team has won

Year	Player	Team	Final Score	PCT
Maximum Score: 30
1986	(United States) Larry Bird	Boston Celtics	22	.733
1987	(United States) Larry Bird (2)	Boston Celtics (2)	16	.533
1988	(United States) Larry Bird (3)	Boston Celtics (3)	17	.567
1989	(United States) Dale Ellis	Seattle SuperSonics	19	.633
1990	(United States) Craig Hodges	Chicago Bulls	19	.633
1991	(United States) Craig Hodges (2)	Chicago Bulls (2)	17	.567
1992	(United States) Craig Hodges (3)	Chicago Bulls (3)	16	.533
1993	(United States) Mark Price	Cleveland Cavaliers	18	.600
1994	(United States) Mark Price (2)	Cleveland Cavaliers (2)	24	.800
1995	(United States) Glen Rice	Miami Heat	17	.567
1996	(United States) Tim Legler	Washington Bullets	20	.667
1997	(United States) Steve Kerr	Chicago Bulls (4)	22	.733
1998	(United States) Jeff Hornacek	Utah Jazz	16	.533
1999	Canceled due to the 1998–99 NBA lockout (Note: The 1999 All-Star Game was cancelled due to the 1998–99 NBA lockout.)			
2000	(United States) Jeff Hornacek (2)	Utah Jazz (2)	13	.433
2001	(United States) Ray Allen	Milwaukee Bucks	19	.633
2002	(Serbia) Peja Stojaković	Sacramento Kings	19	.633
2003	(Serbia) Peja Stojaković (2)	Sacramento Kings (2)	22	.733
2004	(United States) Voshon Lenard	Denver Nuggets	18	.600
2005	(United States) Quentin Richardson	Phoenix Suns	19	.633
2006	(Germany) Dirk Nowitzki	Dallas Mavericks	18	.600
2007	(United States) Jason Kapono	Miami Heat (2)	24	.800
2008	(United States) Jason Kapono (2)	Toronto Raptors	25	.833
2009	(United States) Daequan Cook	Miami Heat (3)	19	.633
2010	(United States) Paul Pierce	Boston Celtics (4)	20	.667
2011	(United States) James Jones	Miami Heat (4)	20	.667
2012	(United States) Kevin Love	Minnesota Timberwolves	17	.567
2013	(United States) Kyrie Irving	Cleveland Cavaliers (3)	23	.767
Maximum score: 34; included four extra "money balls"
2014	(Italy) Marco Belinelli	San Antonio Spurs	24	.706
2015	(United States) Stephen Curry	Golden State Warriors	27	.794
2016	(United States) Klay Thompson	Golden State Warriors	27	.794
2017	(United States) Eric Gordon	Houston Rockets	21	.618
2018	(United States) Devin Booker	Phoenix Suns (2)	28	.824
2019	(United States) Joe Harris	Brooklyn Nets	26	.765
Maximum score: 40; includes two extra long-range shots, worth three points each
2020	(The Bahamas) Buddy Hield	Sacramento Kings (3)	27	.675
2021	(United States) Stephen Curry (2)	Golden State Warriors (3)	28	.700
2022	(Dominican Republic) Karl-Anthony Towns	Minnesota Timberwolves (2)	29	.725
2023	(United States) Damian Lillard	Portland Trail Blazers	26	.650
2024	(United States) Damian Lillard (2)	Milwaukee Bucks (2)	26	.650
2025	(United States) Tyler Herro	Miami Heat (5)	24	.600
2026	(United States) Damian Lillard (3)	Portland Trail Blazers (2)	29	.725

=== Multi-time winners ===
Wins	Player	Team(s)	Years
3	Larry Bird	Boston Celtics	1986, 1987, 1988
3	Craig Hodges	Chicago Bulls	1990, 1991, 1992
3	Damian Lillard	Portland Trail Blazers (2), Milwaukee Bucks (1)	2023, 2024, 2026
2	Stephen Curry	Golden State Warriors	2015, 2021
2	Jeff Hornacek	Utah Jazz	1998, 2000
2	Jason Kapono	Miami Heat (1), Toronto Raptors (1)	2007, 2008
2	Mark Price	Cleveland Cavaliers	1993, 1994
2	Peja Stojaković	Sacramento Kings	2002, 2003

=== Three Point Contest champions by franchise ===
No.	Franchise	Last win
5	Miami Heat	2025
4	Boston Celtics	2010
4	Chicago Bulls	1997
3	Golden State Warriors	2021
3	Sacramento Kings	2020
3	Cleveland Cavaliers	2013
2	Portland Trail Blazers	2026
2	Milwaukee Bucks	2024
2	Minnesota Timberwolves	2022
2	Phoenix Suns	2018
2	Utah Jazz	2000
1	Brooklyn Nets	2019
1	Houston Rockets	2017
1	San Antonio Spurs	2014
1	Toronto Raptors	2008
1	Dallas Mavericks	2006
1	Denver Nuggets	2004
1	Washington Bullets	1996
1	Seattle SuperSonics	1989

== All-time participants ==
**Player** (in bold text)	Indicates the winner of the contest
Player (#)	Denotes the number of times the player has been in the contest

Year	Players
1986	**Larry Bird**, Dale Ellis, Sleepy Floyd, Craig Hodges, Norm Nixon, Kyle Macy, Trent Tucker, Leon Wood
1987	Danny Ainge, **Larry Bird** (2), Michael Cooper, Dale Ellis (2), Craig Hodges (2), Detlef Schrempf, Byron Scott, Kiki Vandeweghe
1988	Danny Ainge (2), **Larry Bird** (3), Dale Ellis (3), Craig Hodges (3), Mark Price, Detlef Schrempf (2), Byron Scott (2), Trent Tucker (2)
1989	Michael Adams, Danny Ainge (3), **Dale Ellis** (4), Derek Harper, Gerald Henderson, Craig Hodges (4), Rimas Kurtinaitis, Reggie Miller, Jon Sundvold
1990	Larry Bird (4), Craig Ehlo, Bobby Hansen, **Craig Hodges** (5), Michael Jordan, Reggie Miller (2), Mark Price (2), Jon Sundvold (2)
1991	Danny Ainge (4), Clyde Drexler, Tim Hardaway, Hersey Hawkins, **Craig Hodges** (6), Terry Porter, Glen Rice, Dennis Scott
1992	Dell Curry, Craig Ehlo (2), **Craig Hodges** (7), Jeff Hornacek, Jim Les, Dražen Petrović, Mitch Richmond, John Stockton
1993	B. J. Armstrong, Dana Barros, Craig Hodges (8), Dan Majerle, Reggie Miller (3), Terry Porter (2), **Mark Price** (3), Kenny Smith
1994	B. J. Armstrong (2), Dana Barros (2), Dell Curry (2), Dale Ellis (5), Steve Kerr, Eric Murdock, **Mark Price** (4), Mitch Richmond (2)
1995	Nick Anderson, Dana Barros (3), Scott Burrell, Steve Kerr (2), Dan Majerle (2), Reggie Miller (4), Chuck Person, **Glen Rice** (2)
1996	Dana Barros (4), Hubert Davis, Steve Kerr (3), **Tim Legler**, George McCloud, Glen Rice (3), Dennis Scott (2), Clifford R. Robinson
1997	Dale Ellis (6), **Steve Kerr** (4), Tim Legler (2), Terry Mills, Sam Perkins, Glen Rice (4), John Stockton (2), Walt Williams
1998	Hubert Davis (2), Dale Ellis (7), **Jeff Hornacek** (2), Sam Mack, Reggie Miller (5), Tracy Murray, Glen Rice (5), Charlie Ward
1999	Cancelled due to the 1998–99 NBA lockout
2000	Ray Allen, Mike Bibby, Hubert Davis (3), **Jeff Hornacek** (3), Allen Iverson, Dirk Nowitzki, Terry Porter (3), Bob Sura
2001	**Ray Allen** (2), Pat Garrity, Allan Houston, Rashard Lewis, Dirk Nowitzki (2), Steve Nash, Bryon Russell, Peja Stojaković
2002	Ray Allen (3), Wesley Person, Mike Miller, Steve Nash (2), Paul Pierce, Quentin Richardson, Steve Smith, **Peja Stojaković** (2)
2003	Brent Barry, Pat Garrity (2), Wesley Person (2), **Peja Stojaković** (3), Antoine Walker, David Wesley
2004	Chauncey Billups, Kyle Korver, **Voshon Lenard**, Rashard Lewis (2), Cuttino Mobley, Peja Stojaković (4)
2005	Ray Allen (4), Joe Johnson, Voshon Lenard (2), Kyle Korver (2), Vladimir Radmanović, **Quentin Richardson** (2)
2006	Gilbert Arenas, Ray Allen (5), Chauncey Billups (2), **Dirk Nowitzki** (3), Quentin Richardson (3), Jason Terry
2007	Gilbert Arenas (2), Damon Jones, **Jason Kapono**, Mike Miller (2), Dirk Nowitzki (4), Jason Terry (2)
2008	Daniel Gibson, Richard Hamilton, **Jason Kapono** (2), Steve Nash (3), Dirk Nowitzki (5), Peja Stojaković (5)
2009	Mike Bibby (2), **Daequan Cook**, Danny Granger, Jason Kapono (3), Rashard Lewis (3), Roger Mason
2010	Chauncey Billups (3), Daequan Cook (2), Stephen Curry, Channing Frye, Danilo Gallinari, **Paul Pierce** (2)
2011	Ray Allen (6), Kevin Durant, Daniel Gibson (2), **James Jones**, Paul Pierce (3), Dorell Wright
2012	Ryan Anderson, Mario Chalmers, James Jones (2), Anthony Morrow, **Kevin Love**, Kevin Durant (2)
2013	Ryan Anderson (2), Matt Bonner, Stephen Curry (2), Paul George, **Kyrie Irving**, Steve Novak
2014	Arron Afflalo, Bradley Beal, **Marco Belinelli**, Stephen Curry (3), Kyrie Irving (2), Joe Johnson (2), Damian Lillard, Kevin Love (2)
2015	Marco Belinelli (2), **Stephen Curry** (4), James Harden, Kyrie Irving (3), Kyle Korver (3), Wesley Matthews, JJ Redick, Klay Thompson
2016	Devin Booker, James Harden (2), Kyle Lowry, Khris Middleton, JJ Redick (2), **Klay Thompson** (2), CJ McCollum (Note: CJ McCollum was named as a replacement to Chris Bosh due to the latter being unable to participate in the event with a calf injury (and later on, a blood clot in his leg).), Stephen Curry (5)
2017	Klay Thompson (3), CJ McCollum (2), Kyle Lowry (2), **Eric Gordon**, Kyrie Irving (4), Kemba Walker, Nick Young, Wesley Matthews (2)
2018	Bradley Beal (2), **Devin Booker** (2), Wayne Ellington, Paul George (2), Tobias Harris, Klay Thompson (4), Eric Gordon (2)
2019	**Joe Harris**, Kemba Walker (2), Khris Middleton, Seth Curry, Damian Lillard (2), Buddy Hield, Danny Green, Devin Booker (3), Dirk Nowitzki (6), Stephen Curry (6)
2020	Devin Booker (4), **Buddy Hield** (2), Trae Young, Joe Harris (2), Duncan Robinson, Zach LaVine, Devonte Graham, Dāvis Bertāns
2021	Donovan Mitchell, **Stephen Curry** (7), Mike Conley, Jayson Tatum, Zach LaVine (2), Jaylen Brown (Note: Mike Conley was named as a replacement to Devin Booker due to the latter being unable to participate in the event with a knee injury.)
2022	Desmond Bane, Luke Kennard, CJ McCollum (3), Patty Mills, Zach LaVine (3), **Karl-Anthony Towns**, Fred VanVleet, Trae Young (2)
2023	Jayson Tatum (2), Buddy Hield (3), **Damian Lillard** (3), Tyler Herro, Kevin Huerter, Julius Randle, Tyrese Haliburton, Lauri Markkanen (Note: Julius Randle was named as a replacement to Anfernee Simons due to the latter being unable to participate in the event with an ankle injury.)
2024 (Note: Stephen Curry competed with Sabrina Ionescu of the WNBA's New York Liberty in an independent three-point shootout during the 2024 All-Star Weekend. Ionescu set the single-round record by an NBA or WNBA player during the 2023 WNBA All Star Weekend in Las Vegas with a second-round score of 37.)	**Damian Lillard** (4), Tyrese Haliburton (2), Donovan Mitchell (2), Lauri Markkanen (2), Jalen Brunson, Karl-Anthony Towns (2), Malik Beasley, Trae Young (3)
2025	Jalen Brunson (2), Cade Cunningham, Darius Garland, **Tyler Herro** (2), Buddy Hield (4), Cameron Johnson, Damian Lillard (5), Norman Powell
2026	Devin Booker (5), Kon Knueppel, **Damian Lillard** (6), Tyrese Maxey, Donovan Mitchell (3), Jamal Murray, Bobby Portis Jr., Norman Powell (2)

== Records ==
=== Points ===
	1st format: maximum score of 30
	2nd format: maximum score of 34
	3rd format: maximum score of 40
Player (#)	Denotes the number of times player is in the top 25
Player (#)	Italics denotes the record was from a tiebreaker

Most points in a non-final round (top 25)
#	Player	Year	R	Score
1	Stephen Curry	2021	1	31
1	Tyrese Haliburton	2023	1	31
1	Buddy Hield	2025	1	31
4	Devin Booker	2026	1	30
5	Mike Conley	2021	1	28
5	Luke Kennard	2022	1	28
7	Stephen Curry (2)	2019	1	27
7	Devin Booker (2)	2020	1	27
7	Buddy Hield (2)	2020	1	27
7	Kon Knueppel	2026	1	27
7	Damian Lillard	2026	1	27
12	Buddy Hield (3)	2019	1	26
12	Davis Bertans	2020	1	26
12	Damian Lillard (2)	2023	1	26
12	Tyrese Haliburton (2)	2024	1	26
12	Damian Lillard (3)	2024	1	26
12	Karl-Anthony Towns	2024	1	26
12	Trae Young	2024	1	26
19	Craig Hodges	1986	1	25
19	Joe Harris	2019	1	25
19	Jayson Tatum	2021	1	25
19	Lauri Markkanen	2024	1	25
23	Craig Hodges (2)	1991	2	24
23	Hubert Davis	1998	2	24
23	Klay Thompson	2015	1	24
23	Eric Gordon	2017	1	24
23	Jalen Brunson	2024	1	24
23	Darius Garland	2025	1	24
23	Donovan Mitchell	2026	1	24

Most points in the final round (top 25)
#	Player	Year	Score
1	Karl-Anthony Towns	2022	29
1	Damian Lillard	2026	29
3	Devin Booker	2018	28
3	Stephen Curry	2021	28
5	Stephen Curry (2)	2015	27
5	Klay Thompson	2016	27
5	Buddy Hield	2020	27
5	Mike Conley	2021	27
5	Devin Booker (2)	2026	27
10	Joe Harris	2019	26
10	Devin Booker (3)	2020	26
10	Luke Kennard	2022	26
10	Trae Young	2022	26
10	Damian Lillard (2)	2024	26
15	Jason Kapono	2008	25
15	Klay Thompson (2)	2018	25
15	Buddy Hield (2)	2023	25
18	Mark Price	1994	24
18	Jason Kapono (2)	2007	24
18	Marco Belinelli	2014	24
18	Stephen Curry (3)	2019	24
18	Damian Lillard (3)	2023	24
18	Karl-Anthony Towns (2)	2024	24
18	Trae Young (2)	2024	24
18	Tyler Herro	2025	24

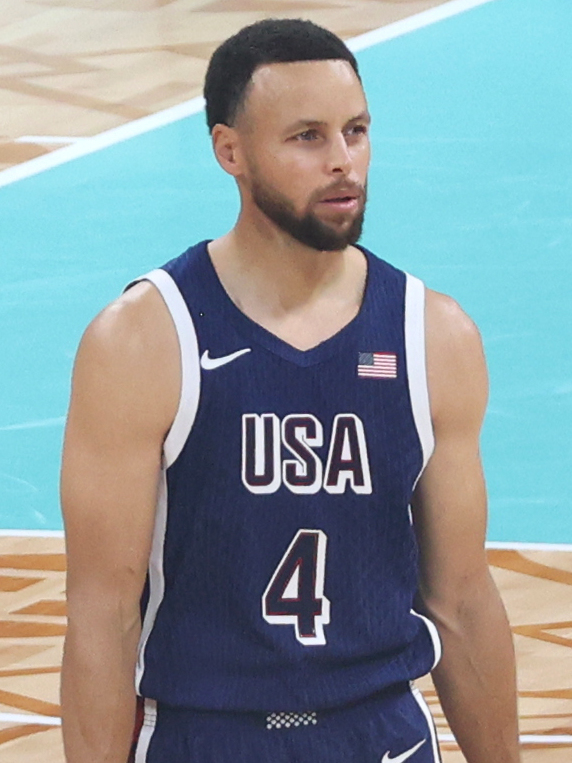
In 2021, Stephen Curry became the first player to score 31 points, tied for the most in the contest's history.

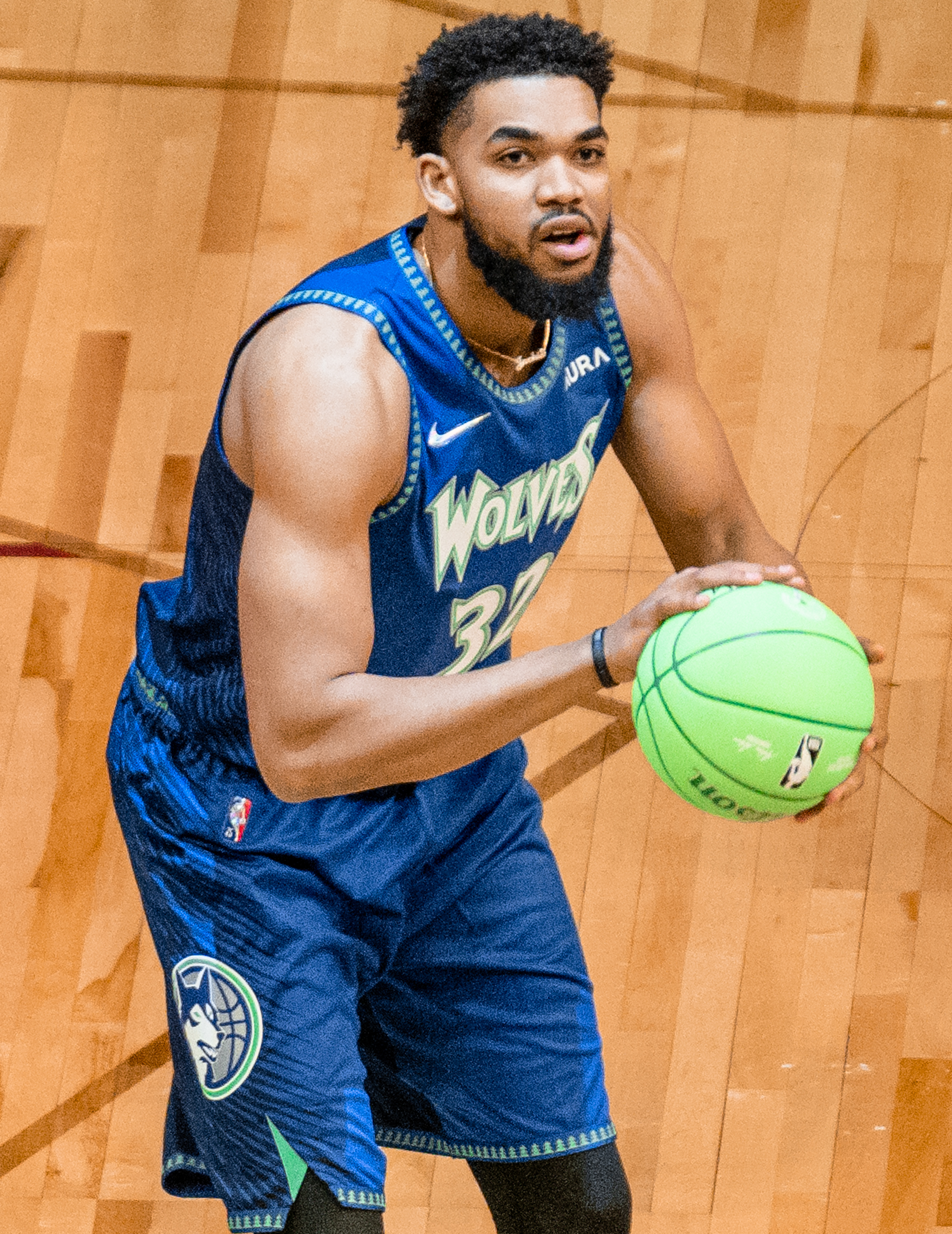
In 2022, Karl-Anthony Towns became the first player to score 29 points in the final round; he is tied with Damian Lillard in 2026 for the most points scored in the final round in the contest's history.

=== Shots made ===
	1st and 2nd formats: maximum of 25 shots
	3rd format: maximum of 27 shots
Player (#)	Denotes the number of times player is in the top 25
Player (#)	Italics denotes the record was from a tiebreaker

Most shots made in a non-final round (top 25)
#	Player	Year	R	Shots
1	Craig Hodges	1991	2	21
1	Stephen Curry	2021	1	21
1	Devin Booker	2026	1	21
4	Mike Conley	2021	1	20
4	Tyrese Haliburton	2023	1	20
4	Buddy Hield	2025	1	20
4	Damian Lillard	2026	1	20
8	Hubert Davis	1998	2	19
8	Stephen Curry (2)	2019	1	19
8	Buddy Hield (2)	2020	1	19
8	Jayson Tatum	2021	1	19
8	Tyrese Haliburton (2)	2024	1	19
8	Lauri Markkanen	2024	1	19
8	Kon Knueppel	2026	1	19
15	Larry Bird	1988	2	18
15	Mark Price	1993	2	18
15	Tim Legler	1996	1	18
15	Tim Legler (2)	1996	2	18
15	Wesley Person	2002	1	18
15	Peja Stojakovic	2003	1	18
15	Peja Stojakovic (2)	2004	1	18
15	Gilbert Arenas	2007	1	18
15	Jason Kapono	2008	1	18
15	James Jones	2012	1	18
15	Klay Thompson	2016	1	18
15	Eric Gordon	2017	1	18
15	Buddy Hield (3)	2019	1	18
15	Devin Booker (2)	2020	1	18
15	Luke Kennard	2022	1	18
15	Buddy Hield (4)	2023	1	18
15	Damian Lillard (2)	2023	1	18
15	Damian Lillard (3)	2024	1	18
15	Darius Garland	2025	1	18
15	Donovan Mitchell	2026	1	18

Most shots made in the final round (top 25)
#	Player	Year	Shots
1	Damian Lillard	2026	21
2	Mark Price	1994	20
2	Jason Kapono	2008	20
2	Kyrie Irving	2013	20
2	Stephen Curry	2015	20
2	Devin Booker	2018	20
2	Karl-Anthony Towns	2022	20
2	Devin Booker (2)	2026	20
9	Jason Kapono (2)	2007	19
9	Klay Thompson	2016	19
9	Joe Harris	2019	19
9	Buddy Hield	2020	19
13	Larry Bird	1986	18
13	Peja Stojakovic	2002	18
13	Marco Belinelli	2014	18
13	Klay Thompson (2)	2018	18
13	Stephen Curry (2)	2019	18
13	Devin Booker (3)	2020	18
13	Mike Conley	2021	18
13	Stephen Curry (3)	2021	18
13	Luke Kennard	2022	18
13	Trae Young	2022	18
13	Trae Young (2)	2024	18
24	Steve Kerr	1997	17
24	Wesley Person	2002	17
24	Wesley Person (2)	2003	17
24	Peja Stojakovic (2)	2003	17
24	Stephen Curry (4)	2016	17
24	Buddy Hield (2)	2017	17

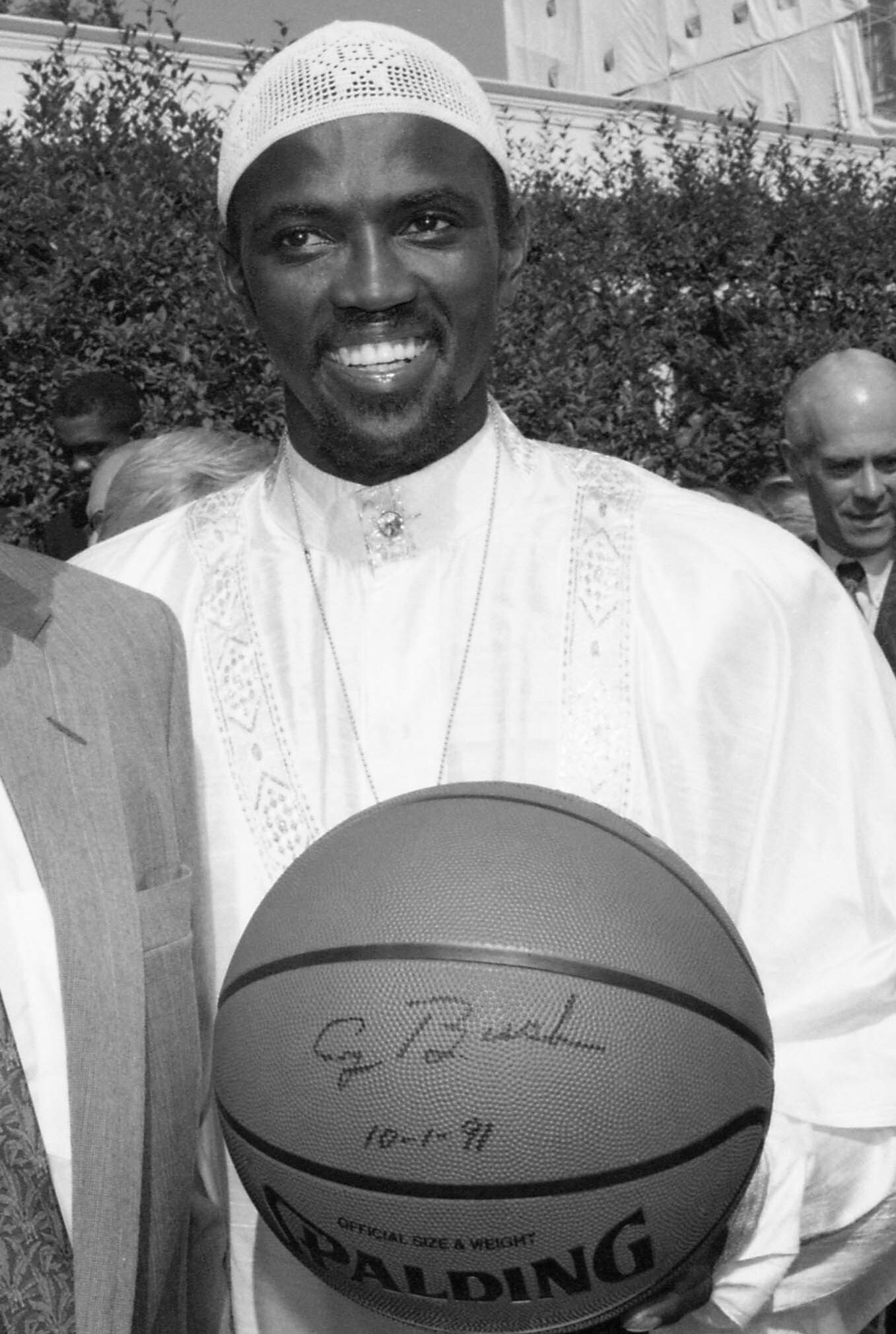
Craig Hodges hit 21 shots in the second round in 1991. He was the sole record holder for most shots made in a non-final round for 20 years until he was joined by Stephen Curry in 2021 and then Devin Booker in 2026.

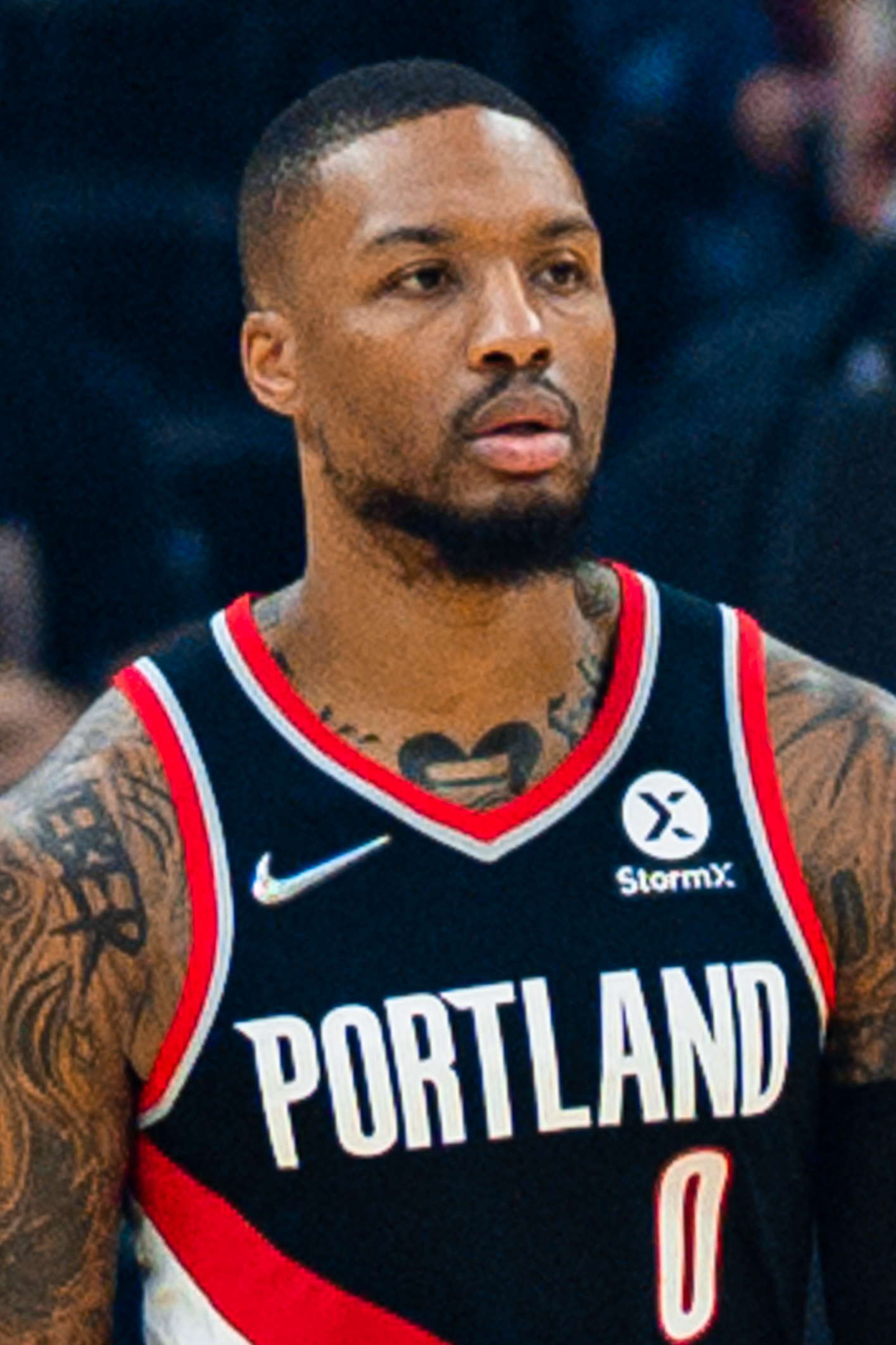
In 2026, Damian Lillard hit 21 shots in the final round, the most in the contest's history.

=== Consecutive shots made ===
	1st and 2nd formats: maximum of 25 shots
	3rd format: maximum of 27 shots
Player (#)	Denotes the number of times player is in the top 25
Player (#)	Italics denotes the record was from a tiebreaker

Most shots made in a row in a non-final round (top 25)
#	Player	Year	R	Shots
1	Craig Hodges	1991	2	19
2	Hubert Davis	1998	2	11
2	Stephen Curry	2016	1	11
4	Ray Allen	2011	1	10
4	Stephen Curry (2)	2019	1	10
4	Tyler Herro	2023	1	10
7	Dennis Scott	1991	1	9
7	Wesley Person	2002	1	9
7	Kyle Korver	2004	1	9
7	Ray Allen (2)	2009	1	9
7	Stephen Curry (3)	2012	1	9
7	Wayne Ellington	2018	1	9
7	Stephen Curry (4)	2021	1	9
7	Lauri Markkanen	2024	1	9
7	Karl-Anthony Towns	2024	1	9
7	Kon Knueppel	2026	1	9
7	Damian Lillard	2026	1	9
18	Mark Price	1993	2	8
18	Mark Price (2)	1994	2	8
18	Dennis Scott (2)	1996	1	8
18	Hubert Davis (2)	1998	1	8
18	Jeff Hornacek	1998	2	8
18	Jason Kapono	2007	1	8
18	Joe Harris	2019	1	8
18	Zach LaVine	2021	1	8
18	Trae Young	2024	1	8
18	Trae Young (2)	2024	1	8
18	Buddy Hield	2025		8

Most shots made in a row in the final round (top 25)
#	Player	Year	Shots
1	Stephen Curry	2015	13
2	Joe Harris	2019	12
3	Larry Bird	1986	11
4	Ray Allen	2001	10
4	Jason Kapono	2008	10
4	Kyrie Irving	2013	10
4	Devin Booker	2026	10
4	Damian Lillard	2026	10
9	Craig Hodges	1991	9
9	Mark Price	1994	9
9	Steve Kerr	1997	9
9	Quentin Richardson	2005	9
9	Tobias Harris	2018	9
9	Stephen Curry (2)	2019	9
15	Larry Bird (2)	1987	8
15	Jim Les	1992	8
15	Kyrie Irving (2)	2015	8
15	Klay Thompson	2016	8
15	Devin Booker (2)	2018	8
15	Karl-Anthony Towns	2022	8
21	Dale Ellis	1989	7
21	Terry Porter	1993	7
21	Mark Price (2)	1993	7
21	Wesley Person	2003	7
21	Jason Kapono (2)	2007	7
21	Daequan Cook	2009	7
21	Matt Bonner	2013	7
21	Stephen Curry (3)	2016	7
21	Eric Gordon	2017	7
21	Mike Conley	2021	7
21	Trae Young	2022	7
21	Buddy Hield	2023	7

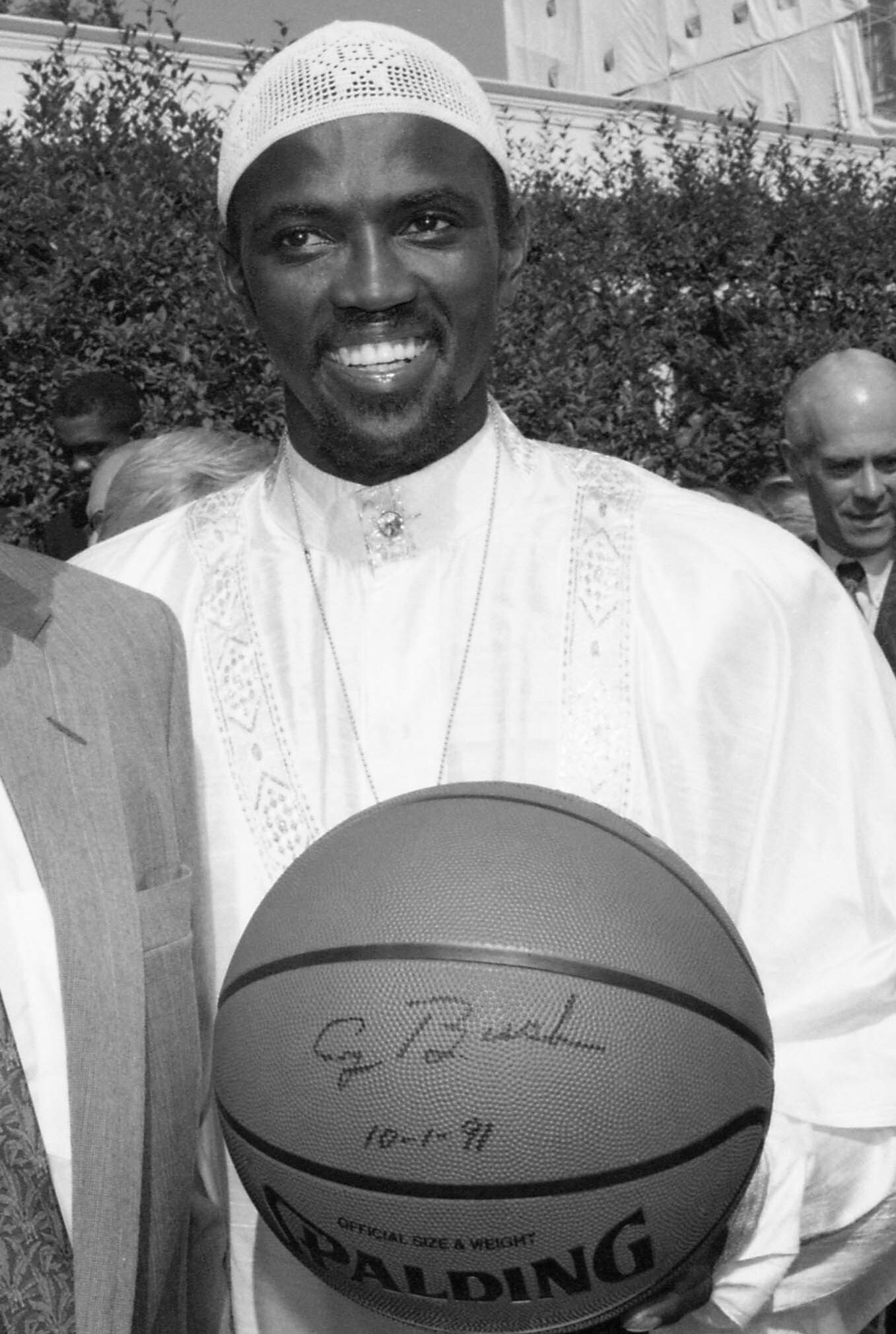
Craig Hodges holds the record for most consecutive shots made in any round with 19 consecutive made shots in 1991.

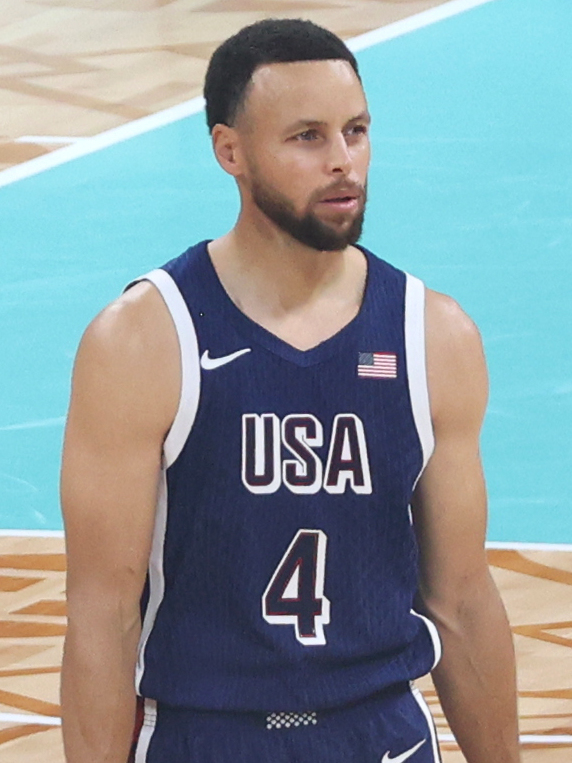
In 2015, Stephen Curry hit 13 consecutive shots in the final round, the most in the contest's history.

== Criticism and controversies ==
In 2005, Fred Hoiberg became the first player in NBA history to lead the league in three-point shooting percentage and not be invited to the three-point shooting competition.

In the 2024 three-point contest, fans expressed dissatisfaction with referees for permitting participants, notably Karl-Anthony Towns, to shoot while their feet were on the line.

== See also ==
- Three-Point Contest in the Women's National Basketball Association (WNBA)
