= 2021 NBA All-Star Game =

Sports competition in Atlanta

	1	2	3	4	Total
Team LeBron	40	60	46	24	170
Team Durant	39	41	45	25	150
- Date: March 7, 2021
- Arena: State Farm Arena
- City: Atlanta
- MVP: Giannis Antetokounmpo (Team LeBron)
- National anthem: Gladys Knight (American); Alessia Cara (Canadian)
- Halftime show: 2021 AT&T Slam Dunk Contest
- Network: TNT and TBS
- Announcers: Marv Albert, Reggie Miller, Chris Webber, and Allie LaForce; Ernie Johnson, Kenny Smith, Shaquille O'Neal, and Dwyane Wade (Skills Competition, 3 Point Contest, and Slam Dunk Contest)
Team LeBron	Team Durant

NBA All-Star Game
< 2020	2022 >

The 2021 NBA All-Star Game was an exhibition basketball game played on March 7, 2021, during the National Basketball Association's (NBA) 2020–21 season. It was the 70th edition of the NBA All-Star Game, and was hosted at State Farm Arena in Atlanta, home of the Atlanta Hawks. With teams captained by LeBron James and Kevin Durant, Team LeBron won the game 170–150. Giannis Antetokounmpo of Team LeBron was named the All-Star Game Most Valuable Player. The game was originally scheduled to be held in Indianapolis, but it was relocated to Atlanta due to the COVID-19 pandemic and resulting scheduling conflicts with the 2021 NCAA Division I men's basketball tournament. The game was televised nationally on TNT for the 19th consecutive year, and simulcast on TBS for the 7th consecutive year.

This was the third time that Atlanta hosted the All-Star Game; the previous times were 1978 and 2003. This was also the sixth time that the Hawks hosted the All-Star Game, as they had also hosted it in St. Louis in 1958, 1962, and 1965. This was the last All-Star game Marv Albert would call in his career.

== Background ==
On December 13, 2017, at a press conference held by the Indiana Pacers, it was announced that the 2021 NBA All-Star Game would be hosted at Bankers Life Fieldhouse in Indianapolis, Indiana. In attendance at the announcement was NBA Commissioner Adam Silver, Pacers owner Herb Simon, Governor Eric Holcomb, and Mayor Joe Hogsett. The team had submitted its bid for the game in grand fashion with then-team president and NBA legend Larry Bird delivering the bid in an Dallara IR-05.

On November 25, 2020, the NBA announced that the All-Star Game would be postponed due to NBA schedule changes as a result of the COVID-19 pandemic and potential schedule conflicts with the 2021 NCAA Division I men's basketball tournament (which, for logistical considerations, was relocated in and around the Indianapolis area). Silver confirmed that Indianapolis will instead host the 2024 NBA All-Star Game. On February 4, 2021, the NBA and the NBA Players Association announced the 2021 All-Star Game had been relocated to State Farm Arena in Atlanta, home of the Atlanta Hawks.

The NBA placed a focus on supporting African-American communities through the All-Star Game; on February 15, it was announced that the NBA and the NBA Players Association would donate $2.5 million to support equitable COVID-19 care and relief, and historically black colleges and universities (HBCUs). The two teams played in support of the Thurgood Marshall College Fund and United Negro College Fund respectively, recorded performances of bands from Florida A&M University and Grambling State University were used for player introductions, and the court was decorated with artwork from students of HBCUs.

=== COVID-19 protocols ===
All participants in the game were required to test negative on a COVID-19 PCR test before they were transported to Atlanta, and they could only bring limited family and friends. They were required to use private transport provided by the league. All NBA players were subject to daily testing during the All-Star break, even if they were not participating in the game, and they were prohibited from travelling internationally or using public accommodations if they did travel out of their home market. For the first week after the break, all players were subject to gameday testing protocols (one rapid test and two PCR tests) daily, even if they were not scheduled to play that day.

The NBA faced criticism for going on with the All-Star Game, raising the possibility of a superspreading event due to participation by players from multiple teams. The possibility that exposure could also occur at events tied to the game was also raised. Multiple players expressed resentment to the decision, including Carmelo Anthony, LeBron James (who described it as a "slap in the face"), and Kawhi Leonard among others. Critics acknowledged that the All-Star Game has been a major source of revenue for the NBA and its media partners which likely factored into the decision to still go on with the event. On March 8, the NBA reported that there were no positive tests among players and staff present on gameday.

The All-Star Game was closed to the public, and there were no other official festivities tied to the game. Spectators were limited to 1,200–1,500 invited guests and were expected to include vaccinated health care workers and the students and faculty of HBCUs. Mayor of Atlanta Keisha Lance Bottoms publicly stated that "we are in agreement that this is a made-for-TV event only"; she asked fans to refrain from travelling to Atlanta for the game and strongly discouraged the hospitality industry from hosting events relating to the game. This request was enforced by the NBA which sent cease-and-desist notices to various local businesses for using its trademarks to promote events tied to the All-Star Game. Artificial crowd noise and virtual fans on screens along the court, similarly to the NBA Bubble, were also utilized.

== Teams ==
=== Coaches ===
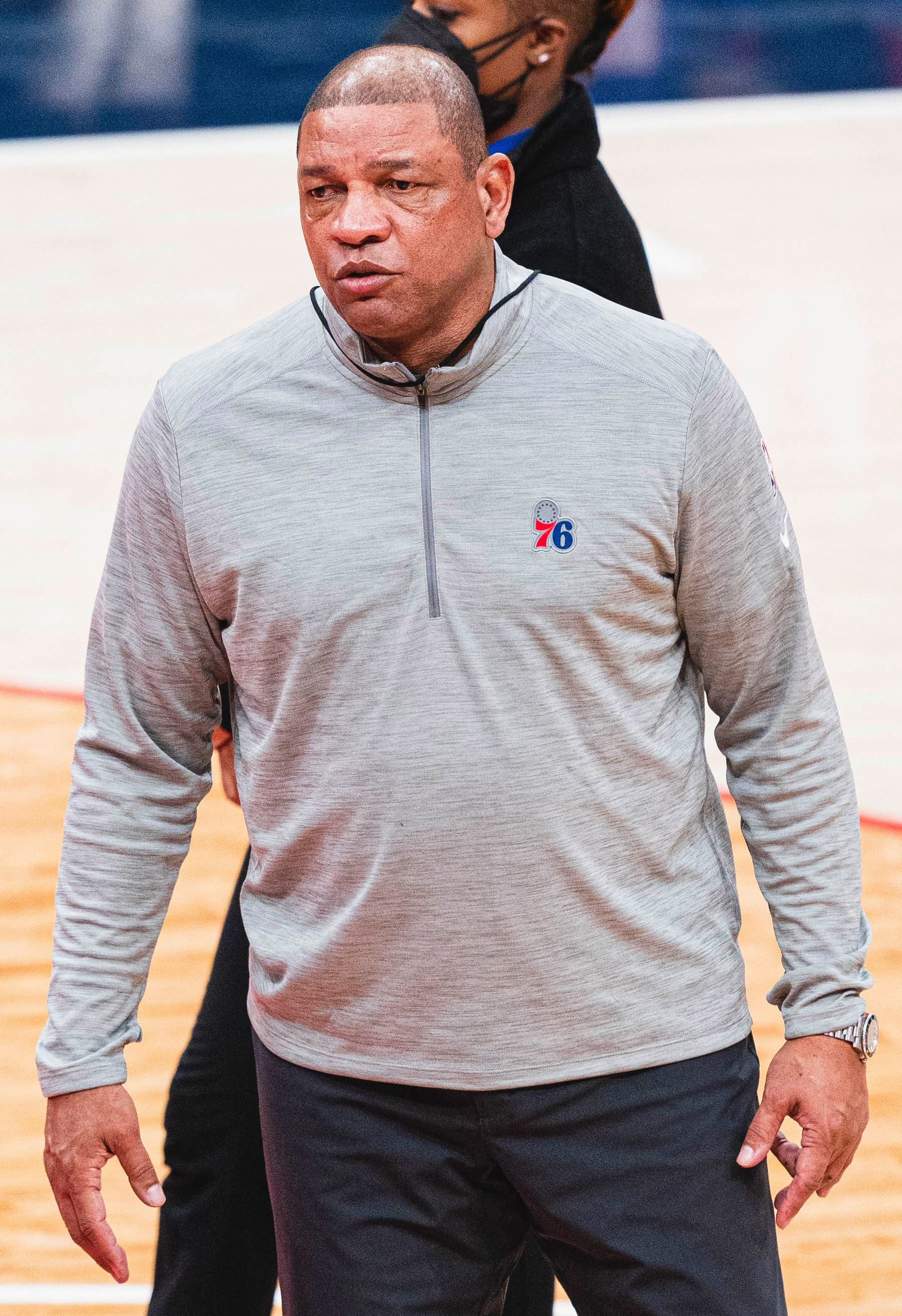
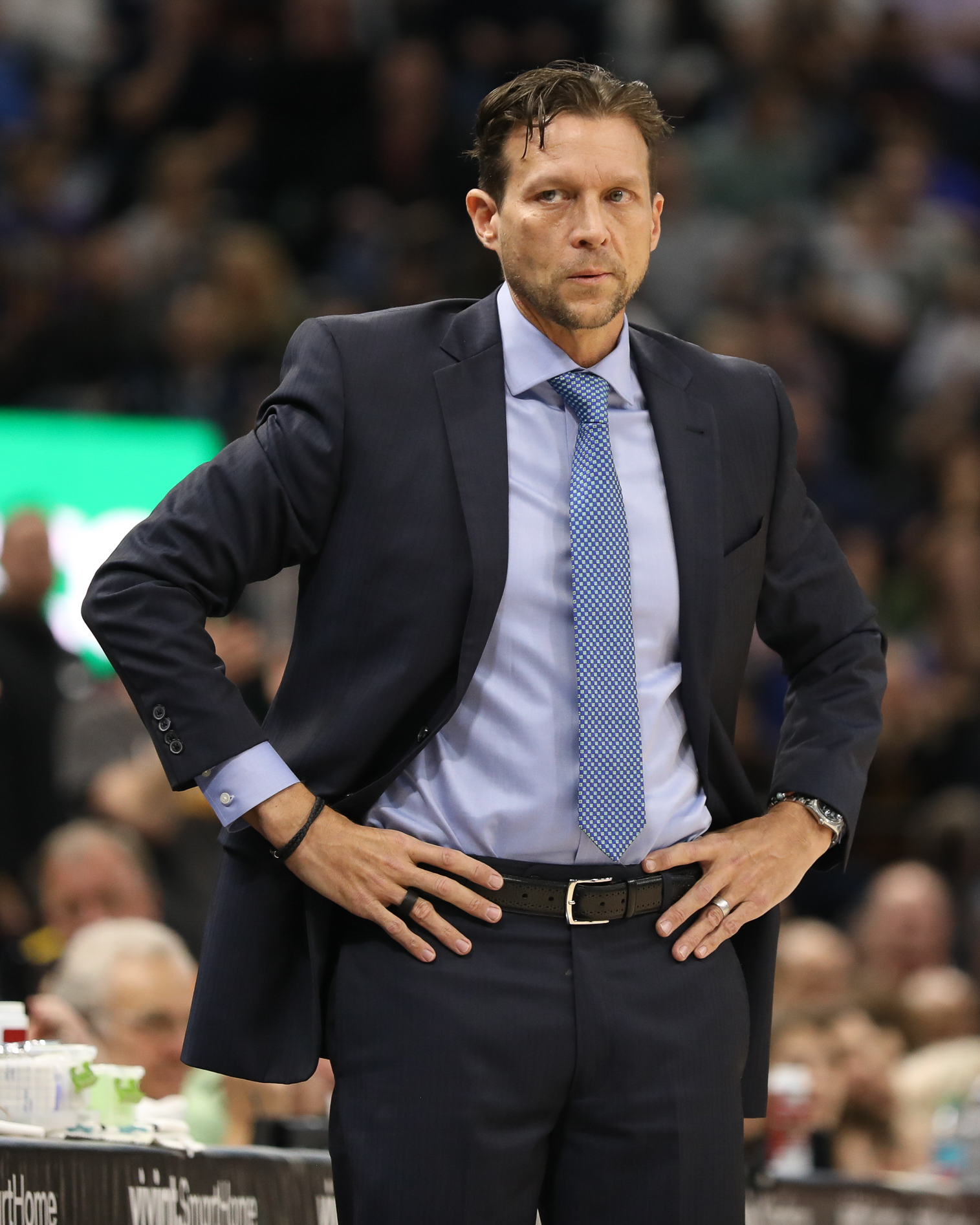
Philadelphia 76ers' Doc Rivers (left) and Utah Jazz's Quin Snyder (right) were selected as head coach for Team Durant and LeBron, respectively

The two teams were coached from their team captain's respective conference. Quin Snyder, head coach of the Western Conference leader Utah Jazz, qualified as the head coach of Team LeBron on February 15. Doc Rivers, head coach of the Eastern Conference leader Philadelphia 76ers, also qualified as the head coach of Team Durant on February 19, after their win over the Chicago Bulls.

=== Rosters ===
As had been the case in previous years, the rosters for the All-Star Game were selected through a voting process. The fans could vote through the NBA website as well as through their Google account. The starters were chosen by the fans, media, and current NBA players. Fans made up 50% of the vote, and NBA players and media each comprised 25% of the vote. The two guards and three frontcourt players who received the highest cumulative vote totals in each conferences were named the All-Star starters and two players in each conferences with the highest votes were named team captains. NBA head coaches voted for the reserves for their respective conferences, none of which could be players from their own team. Each coach selected two guards, three frontcourt players, and two wild cards, with each selected player ranked in order of preference within each category. If a multi-position player was to be selected, coaches were encouraged to vote for the player at the position that was "most advantageous for the All-Star team", regardless of where the player was listed on the All-Star ballot or the position he was listed in box scores.

The All-Star Game starters were announced on February 18, 2021. Bradley Beal of the Washington Wizards and Kyrie Irving of the Brooklyn Nets were named the backcourt starters in the East, earning their third and seventh all-star appearances, respectively. Kevin Durant of the Brooklyn Nets and Giannis Antetokounmpo of the Milwaukee Bucks were named the frontcourt starters in the East, earning their 11th and fifth all-star appearances, respectively. Joining in the East frontcourt was Joel Embiid of the Philadelphia 76ers, his fourth selection.

Luka Dončić of the Dallas Mavericks and Stephen Curry of the Golden State Warriors were named to the starting backcourt in the West, earning their second and seventh all-star appearances, respectively. In the frontcourt, Kawhi Leonard of the Los Angeles Clippers and LeBron James of the Los Angeles Lakers was named to their fifth and 17th all-star selections, respectively. Joining them was Nikola Jokić of the Denver Nuggets, in his third all-star selection.

The All-Star Game reserves were announced on February 23, 2021. The West reserves included Anthony Davis of the Los Angeles Lakers, his eighth selection; Paul George of the Los Angeles Clippers, his seventh selection; Rudy Gobert of the Utah Jazz, his second selection; Damian Lillard of the Portland Trail Blazers, his sixth selection; Donovan Mitchell of the Utah Jazz, his second selection; Chris Paul of the Phoenix Suns, his 11th selection; and Zion Williamson of the New Orleans Pelicans, his first selection.

The East reserves included Jaylen Brown of the Boston Celtics, his first selection; James Harden of the Brooklyn Nets, his ninth selection; Zach LaVine of the Chicago Bulls, his first selection; Julius Randle of the New York Knicks, his first selection; Ben Simmons of the Philadelphia 76ers, his third selection; Jayson Tatum of the Boston Celtics, his second selection; and Nikola Vučević of the Orlando Magic, his second selection.

- Italics indicates leading vote-getters per conference

Eastern Conference All-Stars
Pos	Player	Team	No. of selections
Starters
G	Bradley Beal	Washington Wizards	3
G	Kyrie Irving	Brooklyn Nets	7
F	Giannis Antetokounmpo	Milwaukee Bucks	5
F	Kevin Durant^{INJ2}	Brooklyn Nets	11
C	Joel Embiid^{COVID1}	Philadelphia 76ers	4
Reserves
G	Jaylen Brown	Boston Celtics	1
G	James Harden	Brooklyn Nets	9
G	Zach LaVine	Chicago Bulls	1
G	Ben Simmons^{COVID2}	Philadelphia 76ers	3
F	Julius Randle	New York Knicks	1
F	Domantas Sabonis^{REP2}	Indiana Pacers	2
F	Jayson Tatum^{ST1}	Boston Celtics	2
C	Nikola Vučević	Orlando Magic	2

Western Conference All-Stars
Pos	Player	Team	No. of selections
Starters
G	Stephen Curry	Golden State Warriors	7
G	Luka Dončić	Dallas Mavericks	2
F	LeBron James	Los Angeles Lakers	17
F	Kawhi Leonard	Los Angeles Clippers	5
C	Nikola Jokić	Denver Nuggets	3
Reserves
G	Devin Booker^{REP1}^{INJ3}	Phoenix Suns	2
G	Mike Conley ^{REP3}	Utah Jazz	1
G	Damian Lillard	Portland Trail Blazers	6
G	Donovan Mitchell	Utah Jazz	2
G	Chris Paul	Phoenix Suns	11
F	Anthony Davis^{INJ1}	Los Angeles Lakers	8
F	Paul George	Los Angeles Clippers	7
F	Zion Williamson^{ST2}	New Orleans Pelicans	1
C	Rudy Gobert	Utah Jazz	2

^INJ1 Anthony Davis was unable to play due to a calf injury.
^REP1 Devin Booker was selected as Anthony Davis's replacement.
^INJ2 Kevin Durant was unable to play due to a hamstring injury.
^REP2 Domantas Sabonis was selected as Kevin Durant's replacement.
^ST1 Jayson Tatum was selected to start in place of Durant.
^INJ3 Devin Booker was unable to play due to knee injury.
^REP3 Mike Conley was selected as Devin Booker's replacement.
^ST2 Zion Williamson started in place of Joel Embiid on Team Durant, who was out for the game due to contact tracing in addition to his teammate Ben Simmons.

=== Draft ===
The NBA All-Star Draft took place on March 4, 2021. LeBron James and Kevin Durant were named captains, as they both received the most votes from the West and East, respectively. This was the fourth straight year that James was named an All-Star team captain, while this was Durant's first selection as team captain. The first eight players that were drafted were starters. The next fourteen players (seven from each conference) were chosen by NBA head coaches. NBA Commissioner Adam Silver selected replacements for any player unable to participate in the All-Star Game, choosing a player from the same conference as the player who was being replaced. Silver's selection joined the team that drafted the replaced player. If a replaced player was a starter, the head coach of that team would choose a new starter from their cast of players instead.

James picked Giannis Antetokounmpo with his first pick, and Durant picked Kyrie Irving second. Team Durant was the home team due to the Eastern Conference having home team status for the game.

2021 All-Star Draft
Pick	Player	Team
1	Giannis Antetokounmpo	LeBron
2	Kyrie Irving	Durant
3	Stephen Curry	LeBron
4	Joel Embiid	Durant
5	Luka Dončić	LeBron
6	Kawhi Leonard	Durant
7	Nikola Jokić	LeBron
8	Bradley Beal	Durant
9	Jayson Tatum	Durant
10	James Harden	Durant
11	Damian Lillard	LeBron
12	Devin Booker	Durant
13	Ben Simmons	LeBron
14	Zion Williamson	Durant
15	Chris Paul	LeBron
16	Zach LaVine	Durant
17	Jaylen Brown	LeBron
18	Julius Randle	Durant
19	Paul George	LeBron
20	Nikola Vučević	Durant
21	Domantas Sabonis	LeBron
22	Donovan Mitchell	Durant
23	Rudy Gobert	LeBron

=== Lineups ===
Team Durant
Pos	Player	Team
Starters
G	Kyrie Irving	Brooklyn Nets
C	Joel Embiid^{COVID1}	Philadelphia 76ers
F	Kawhi Leonard	Los Angeles Clippers
G	Bradley Beal	Washington Wizards
F	Jayson Tatum^{ST1}	Boston Celtics
Reserves
G	James Harden	Brooklyn Nets
F	Zion Williamson^{ST2}	New Orleans Pelicans
G	Zach LaVine	Chicago Bulls
F	Julius Randle	New York Knicks
C	Nikola Vučević	Orlando Magic
G	Donovan Mitchell	Utah Jazz
G	Mike Conley Jr.^{REP3}	Utah Jazz
Head coach: Doc Rivers (Philadelphia 76ers)

Team LeBron
Pos	Player	Team
Starters
F	LeBron James	Los Angeles Lakers
F	Giannis Antetokounmpo	Milwaukee Bucks
G	Stephen Curry	Golden State Warriors
G	Luka Dončić	Dallas Mavericks
C	Nikola Jokić	Denver Nuggets
Reserves
G	Damian Lillard	Portland Trail Blazers
G	Ben Simmons^{COVID2}	Philadelphia 76ers
G	Chris Paul	Phoenix Suns
G	Jaylen Brown	Boston Celtics
F	Paul George	Los Angeles Clippers
F	Domantas Sabonis^{REP2}	Indiana Pacers
C	Rudy Gobert	Utah Jazz
Head coach: Quin Snyder (Utah Jazz)

Hours before the opening tip, the 76ers' Embiid and Simmons were scratched from the game due to NBA COVID-19 protocols as they had visited a local barber in Philadelphia who later tested positive before they traveled to Atlanta. No replacements were named, and each squad went with 11 players. Coach Rivers chose Williamson to start for Team Durant in place of Embiid.

== Game summary ==
Giannis Antetokounmpo scored 35 points on a perfect 16-of-16 shooting from the field to lead Team LeBron to a 170–150 win and capture All-Star MVP honors. He set an All-Star record for most attempts without a miss, surpassing Hal Greer's 8-for-8 in 1968. Damian Lillard and Stephen Curry added 32 and 28 points, respectively, and both made eight three-point field goals for Team LeBron, including several from more than 30 feet from the basket. Team Durant was led by Bradley Beal's 26 points.

The game used the same format as the 2020 edition: the team that scored the most points during each of the first three 12-minute quarters would receive a cash prize to be donated to a designated charity. The fourth quarter was untimed, with the first team to meet or exceed a "target score"—the score of the leading team in total scoring after three quarters plus 24—declared the winner. Team LeBron controlled the contest after winning the second quarter by 19 points, while also taking the first and third quarters by one point each. Lillard made a walk-off 40-foot (12 m) three-pointer to win it. LeBron James finished with just four points in 13 minutes, played the first half and rested thereafter. His prior low in his 16 previous All-Star games was 13 points. Team LeBron donated over $1 million to the Thurgood Marshall College Fund, while Team Durant gave $500,000 to the United Negro College Fund.

TNT, TBS

March 7, 2021
8:00 pm ET

Box score

Team LeBron 170, Team Durant 150
Scoring by quarter: 40–39, 60–41, 46–45, 24–25
Pts: Giannis Antetokounmpo 35; Rebs: Chris Paul 8 Asts: Chris Paul 16	Pts: Bradley Beal 26; Rebs: Kawhi Leonard 9 Asts: Kyrie Irving 12

State Farm Arena, Atlanta, Georgia
Referees:
- #49 Tom Washington
- #6 Tony Brown
- #61 Courtney Kirkland

== All-Star Weekend ==
Most NBA All-Star Weekend festivities were canceled, while some of the traditional Saturday-night competitions were moved to Sunday with the All-Star Game itself. The Skills Challenge and Three-Point Contest were held before the game, and the Slam Dunk Contest at halftime.

=== Rising Stars Challenge ===
Due to the downsizing of the All-Star Game due to the COVID-19 pandemic, the NBA All-Star Weekend was not held, and the Rising Stars Challenge was not played. The NBA still named the Rising Stars rosters of first- and second-year players.

Team World
Pos.	Nat.	Player	Team	R/S
F	(Nigeria)	Precious Achiuwa	Miami Heat	Rookie
G	(Canada)	Nickeil Alexander-Walker	New Orleans Pelicans	Sophomore
F	(Israel)	Deni Avdija	Washington Wizards	Rookie
G/F	(Canada)	RJ Barrett	New York Knicks	Sophomore
G	(Argentina)	Facundo Campazzo	Denver Nuggets	Rookie
F	(Canada)	Brandon Clarke	Memphis Grizzlies	Sophomore
G	(Canada)	Luguentz Dort	Oklahoma City Thunder	Sophomore
F	(Japan)	Rui Hachimura	Washington Wizards	Sophomore
G	(France)	Théo Maledon	Oklahoma City Thunder	Rookie
G	(Canada)	Mychal Mulder	Golden State Warriors	Sophomore

Team USA
Pos.	Player	Team	R/S
G	LaMelo Ball	Charlotte Hornets	Rookie
G	Anthony Edwards	Minnesota Timberwolves	Rookie
G	Tyrese Haliburton	Sacramento Kings	Rookie
G	Tyler Herro	Miami Heat	Sophomore
F	De'Andre Hunter	Atlanta Hawks	Sophomore
G/F	Keldon Johnson	San Antonio Spurs	Sophomore
G	Ja Morant	Memphis Grizzlies	Sophomore
F	Michael Porter Jr.	Denver Nuggets	Sophomore
F	Zion Williamson	New Orleans Pelicans	Sophomore
C	James Wiseman	Golden State Warriors	Rookie

A Rising Stars roster was named to honor the league's top first- and second-year players, but the game was not played.

=== Skills Challenge ===
Contestants
Pos.	Player	Team	Height	Weight
F	Robert Covington	Portland Trail Blazers	6–7	209
G/F	Luka Dončić	Dallas Mavericks	6–7	230
G	Chris Paul	Phoenix Suns	6–0	175
F/C	Julius Randle	New York Knicks	6–8	250
F/C	Domantas Sabonis	Indiana Pacers	6–11	240
C	Nikola Vučević	Orlando Magic	6–11	260

Quarterfinals
Domantas Sabonis (Indiana)	O
Julius Randle (New York)	X
Nikola Vučević (Orlando)	O
Robert Covington (Portland)	X

Semifinals
Domantas Sabonis (Indiana)	O
Luka Dončić (Dallas)	X
Nikola Vučević (Orlando)	O
Chris Paul (Phoenix)	X

Finals
Domantas Sabonis (Indiana)	O
Nikola Vučević (Orlando)	X

=== Three-Point Contest ===
Curry won his second Three-Point Contest after making his last shot in the final round to edge Mike Conley Jr. 28–27.

Contestants
Pos.	Player	Team	Height	Weight	First round	Final round
G	Stephen Curry	Golden State Warriors	6–3	185	31	28
G	Mike Conley Jr.^{REP1}	Utah Jazz	6–1	175	28	27
F	Jayson Tatum	Boston Celtics	6–8	210	25	17
G/F	Zach LaVine	Chicago Bulls	6–5	200	22	DNQ
G	Donovan Mitchell	Utah Jazz	6–3	215	22	DNQ
G/F	Jaylen Brown	Boston Celtics	6–6	223	17	DNQ
G	Devin Booker^{INJ1}	Phoenix Suns	6–5	206	DNP	DNP

^INJ1 Devin Booker was unable to play due to knee injury.
^REP1 Mike Conley was selected as Devin Booker's replacement.

=== Slam Dunk Contest ===
- Note: The final round was decided by votes from the judges.

Contestants
Pos.	Player	Team	Height	Weight	First round	Final round
G	Anfernee Simons	Portland Trail Blazers	6–3	181	95 (46+49)	3
F	Obi Toppin	New York Knicks	6–9	220	94 (48+46)	2
G	Cassius Stanley	Indiana Pacers	6–5	190	81 (44+37)	DNQ

== Broadcasting ==
The All-Star Game was broadcast by TNT for the 19th consecutive year. The game was seen by 5.94 million viewers, an 18% decrease over 2020 and the least-watched All-Star Game overall, but it beat CBS's Oprah with Meghan and Harry special in key demographic audience share.

Additionally, this was the final NBA All-Star Game to ever be called by Marv Albert, as he announced his retirement from broadcasting following the 2021 Playoffs.
