= 2020 NBA All-Star Game =

American basketball competition

	1	2	3	4	Total
Team LeBron	53	30	41	33	157
Team Giannis	41	51	41	22	155
- Date: February 16, 2020
- Arena: United Center
- City: Chicago
- MVP: Kawhi Leonard (Team LeBron)
- National anthem: Chaka Khan (American); Tenille Arts (Canadian)
- Halftime show: Chance the Rapper, DJ Khaled, Lil Wayne, Quavo
- Network: TNT, TBS
- Announcers: Marv Albert, Reggie Miller, Grant Hill, and Allie LaForce; Kevin Harlan, Reggie Miller, Dwyane Wade, Candace Parker, Kenny Smith, and Kristen Ledlow (All-Star Saturday Night); Brian Anderson, Donovan Mitchell, Myles Turner, and Jared Greenberg (Rising Stars Challenge)
Team Giannis	Team LeBron

NBA All-Star Game
< 2019	2021 >

The 2020 NBA All-Star Game was an exhibition basketball game that was played on February 16, 2020, during the National Basketball Association's (NBA) 2019–20 season. It was the 69th edition of the NBA All-Star Game, and was played at the United Center in Chicago, home of the Chicago Bulls. Team LeBron defeated Team Giannis, 157–155. This was the third time that Chicago hosted the All-Star Game. The other two times, in 1973 and 1988, the game was played at Chicago Stadium, the Bulls' previous home arena. The game was televised nationally by TNT for the 18th consecutive year, and simulcast by TBS for the 6th consecutive year. After airing a “Players Only” broadcast a year ago, TBS returned to simulcasting TNT's coverage, after the “Players Only” brand was canceled by the NBA and Turner Sports.

This was the first of four NBA All-Star Games to use the Elam Ending and the only one of the four where the leading team at the point the target score was set went on to lose the game.

== All-Star Game ==
=== Coaches ===
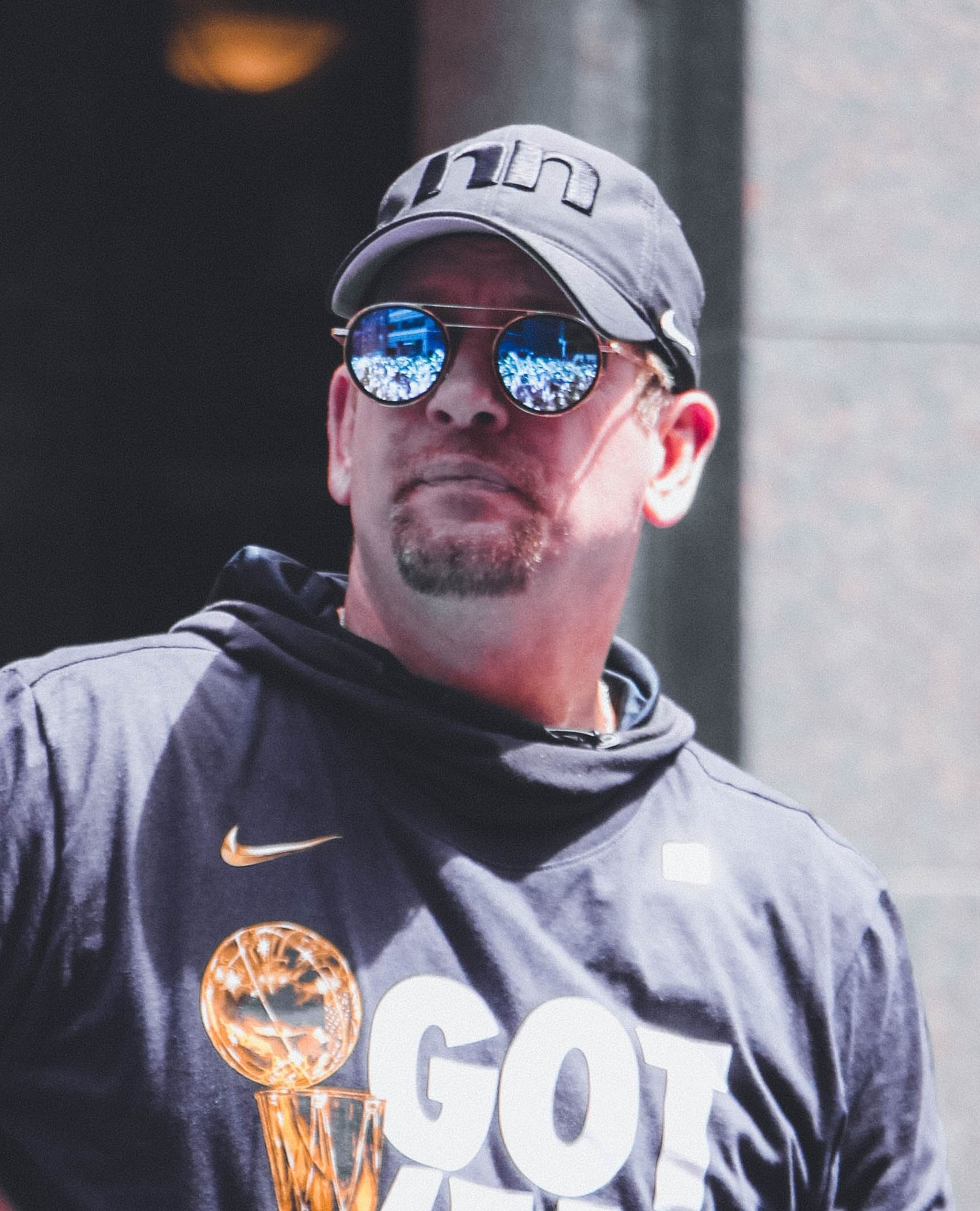
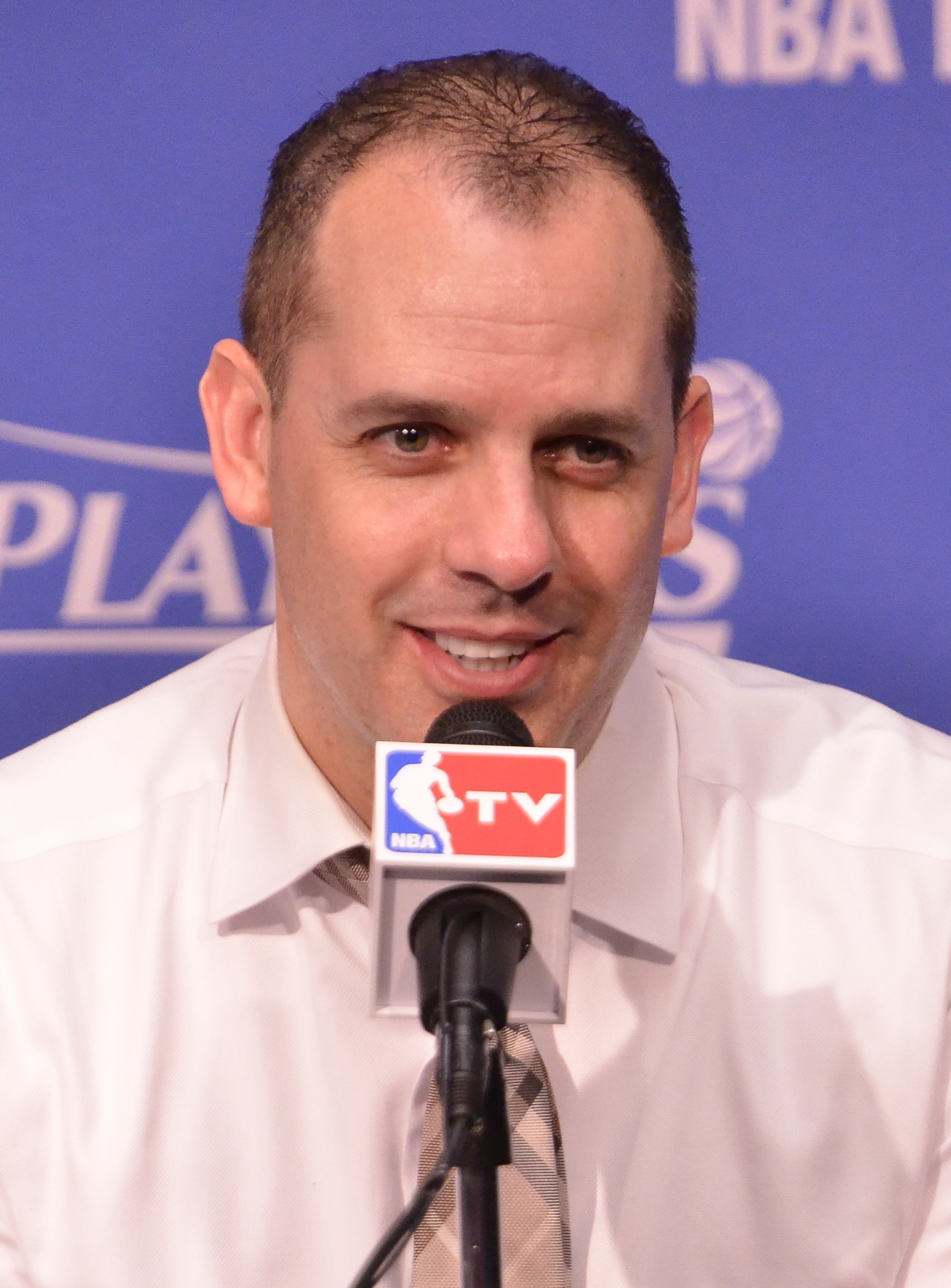
Nick Nurse (left) and Frank Vogel were selected as head coach for Team Giannis and Team LeBron, respectively.

The two coaches came from the two teams leading their respective conferences as of February 2, 2020, with certain restrictions. They were assigned to the All-Star team of their namesake team captains from their respective conference. Frank Vogel, head coach of the Western Conference-leading Los Angeles Lakers, qualified as the head coach for Team LeBron on January 23. Nick Nurse, head coach of the Toronto Raptors, qualified as the head coach for Team Giannis on January 31. Although the Milwaukee Bucks had the best record in the Eastern Conference prior to the game, their head coach, Mike Budenholzer, was ineligible to coach in the All-Star Game as league rules prohibited a coach from coaching in consecutive All-Star Games (he had coached in the 2019 game).

=== Rosters ===
As had been the case in previous years, the rosters for the All-Star Game were selected through a voting process. The fans could vote through the NBA website as well as through their Google account. The starters were chosen by the fans, media, and current NBA players. Fans made up 50% of the vote, and NBA players and media each comprised 25% of the vote. The two guards and three frontcourt players who received the highest cumulative vote totals in each conferences were named the All-Star starters and two players in each conferences with the highest votes were named team captains. NBA head coaches voted for the reserves for their respective conferences, none of which could be players from their own team. Each coach selected two guards, three frontcourt players and two wild cards, with each selected player ranked in order of preference within each category. If a multi-position player was to be selected, coaches were encouraged to vote for the player at the position that was "most advantageous for the All-Star team", regardless of where the player was listed on the All-Star ballot or the position he was listed in box scores.

The All-Star Game starters were announced on January 23, 2020. Trae Young of the Atlanta Hawks and Kemba Walker of the Boston Celtics were named the backcourt starters in the East, earning their first and fourth all-star appearances, respectively. Pascal Siakam of the Toronto Raptors and Giannis Antetokounmpo of the Milwaukee Bucks were named the frontcourt starters in the East, earning their first and fourth all-star appearances, respectively. Joining in the East frontcourt was Joel Embiid of the Philadelphia 76ers, his third selection.

Luka Dončić of the Dallas Mavericks and James Harden of the Houston Rockets were named to the starting backcourt in the West, earning their first and eighth all-star appearances, respectively. In the frontcourt, Kawhi Leonard of the Los Angeles Clippers was named to his fourth career all-star game, along with Anthony Davis and LeBron James of the Los Angeles Lakers, their seventh and 16th all-star selections, respectively.

The All-Star Game reserves were announced on January 30, 2020. The West reserves included Russell Westbrook of the Houston Rockets, his ninth selection, Rudy Gobert of the Utah Jazz, his first selection, Brandon Ingram of the New Orleans Pelicans, his first selection, Damian Lillard of the Portland Trail Blazers, his fifth selection, Chris Paul of the Oklahoma City Thunder, his tenth selection, Nikola Jokić of the Denver Nuggets, his second selection, and Donovan Mitchell of the Utah Jazz, his first selection.

The East reserves included Kyle Lowry of the Toronto Raptors, his sixth selection, Khris Middleton of the Milwaukee Bucks, his second selection, Jimmy Butler of the Miami Heat, his fifth selection, Domantas Sabonis of the Indiana Pacers, his first selection, Ben Simmons of the Philadelphia 76ers, his second selection, Jayson Tatum of the Boston Celtics, his first selection, and Bam Adebayo of the Miami Heat, his first selection.

- Italics indicates leading vote-getters per conference

Eastern Conference All-Stars
Pos	Player	Team	No. of selections
Starters
G	Kemba Walker	Boston Celtics	4
G	Trae Young	Atlanta Hawks	1
F	Giannis Antetokounmpo	Milwaukee Bucks	4
F	Pascal Siakam	Toronto Raptors	1
C	Joel Embiid	Philadelphia 76ers	3
Reserves
G	Kyle Lowry	Toronto Raptors	6
G	Ben Simmons	Philadelphia 76ers	2
G	Jimmy Butler	Miami Heat	5
F	Khris Middleton	Milwaukee Bucks	2
F	Bam Adebayo	Miami Heat	1
F	Jayson Tatum	Boston Celtics	1
C	Domantas Sabonis	Indiana Pacers	1

Western Conference All-Stars
Pos	Player	Team	No. of selections
Starters
G	James Harden	Houston Rockets	8
G	Luka Dončić	Dallas Mavericks	1
F	LeBron James	Los Angeles Lakers	16
F	Kawhi Leonard	Los Angeles Clippers	4
C	Anthony Davis	Los Angeles Lakers	7
Reserves
G	Chris Paul	Oklahoma City Thunder	10
G	Russell Westbrook	Houston Rockets	9
G	Damian Lillard^{INJ1}	Portland Trail Blazers	5
G	Donovan Mitchell	Utah Jazz	1
F	Brandon Ingram	New Orleans Pelicans	1
C	Nikola Jokić	Denver Nuggets	2
C	Rudy Gobert	Utah Jazz	1
G	Devin Booker^{REP1}	Phoenix Suns	1

^INJ1 Damian Lillard was unable to play due to a groin injury.
^REP1 Devin Booker was selected as Damian Lillard's replacement.

=== Draft ===
The draft took place on February 6, 2020, on TNT. LeBron James and Giannis Antetokounmpo were both named captains for the second year in a row, as they both received the most votes from the West and East, respectively. This was the third straight year that James was named an All-Star team captain, while this was Giannis’ second consecutive selection as team captain. The first eight players drafted were starters. The next fourteen players (seven from each conference) were chosen by NBA head coaches. NBA Commissioner Adam Silver selected the replacement for any player unable to participate in the All-Star Game, choosing a player from the same conference as the player who was being replaced. Silver's selection would join the team that drafted the replaced player. If a replaced player was a starter, the head coach of that team would choose a new starter from his cast of players instead.

James picked Anthony Davis with his first pick, and Antetokounmpo picked Joel Embiid second. Team Giannis was the home team due to the Eastern Conference having home team status for the game.

2020 All-Star Draft
Pick	Player	Team
1	Anthony Davis	LeBron
2	Joel Embiid	Giannis
3	Kawhi Leonard	LeBron
4	Pascal Siakam	Giannis
5	Luka Dončić	LeBron
6	Kemba Walker	Giannis
7	James Harden	LeBron
8	Trae Young	Giannis
9	Khris Middleton	Giannis
10	Damian Lillard	LeBron
11	Bam Adebayo	Giannis
12	Ben Simmons	LeBron
13	Rudy Gobert	Giannis
14	Nikola Jokić	LeBron
15	Jimmy Butler	Giannis
16	Jayson Tatum	LeBron
17	Kyle Lowry	Giannis
18	Chris Paul	LeBron
19	Brandon Ingram	Giannis
20	Russell Westbrook	LeBron
21	Donovan Mitchell	Giannis
22	Domantas Sabonis	LeBron

=== Lineups ===
Team LeBron
Pos	Player	Team
Starters
F	LeBron James	Los Angeles Lakers
C	Anthony Davis	Los Angeles Lakers
F	Kawhi Leonard	Los Angeles Clippers
G	Luka Dončić	Dallas Mavericks
G	James Harden	Houston Rockets
Reserves
G	Damian Lillard^{INJ1}	Portland Trail Blazers
G	Ben Simmons	Philadelphia 76ers
C	Nikola Jokić	Denver Nuggets
F	Jayson Tatum	Boston Celtics
G	Chris Paul	Oklahoma City Thunder
G	Russell Westbrook	Houston Rockets
C	Domantas Sabonis	Indiana Pacers
G	Devin Booker^{REP1}	Phoenix Suns
Head coach: Frank Vogel (Los Angeles Lakers)

Team Giannis
Pos	Player	Team
Starters
F	Giannis Antetokounmpo	Milwaukee Bucks
C	Joel Embiid	Philadelphia 76ers
F	Pascal Siakam	Toronto Raptors
G	Kemba Walker	Boston Celtics
G	Trae Young	Atlanta Hawks
Reserves
F	Khris Middleton	Milwaukee Bucks
F	Bam Adebayo	Miami Heat
C	Rudy Gobert	Utah Jazz
G	Jimmy Butler	Miami Heat
G	Kyle Lowry	Toronto Raptors
F	Brandon Ingram	New Orleans Pelicans
G	Donovan Mitchell	Utah Jazz
Head coach: Nick Nurse (Toronto Raptors)

=== Game ===
It was announced on January 30, 2020, that the game would use a new format. The first three quarters were individually scored as separate games, with the scoreboard resetting after each quarter. The team that won each quarter got $100,000 for their team's charity; if tied, the total was added to the pot for the next quarter. At the end of the third quarter, the cumulative score was posted on the scoreboard, and the entire period was played under The Basketball Tournament's Elam Ending, a rule recommended by players' union president Chris Paul, who coached in the aforementioned tournament in 2019, for the entire quarter. The NBA All-Star Game's Elam Ending used a target score of 24 points more than the leading team's or both teams' score in honor of Kobe Bryant, who died three weeks earlier on January 26, 2020. The winning team won $200,000 for their charity. If one team had won each of the first three quarters and reached the target score first, $500,000 would have been donated to the winning team's charity and $100,000 would have been donated to the losing team's charity.

To further honor Kobe Bryant and his daughter Gianna, who died with him in the Calabasas helicopter crash, players on Team LeBron wore #2 (Gianna's basketball number), while players on Team Giannis wore #24 (Bryant's number from 2006 to 2016).

Team LeBron won the 1st quarter, and Team Giannis won the 2nd quarter, and the 3rd quarter was tied, so the $100,000 was carried over to the 4th quarter, for a total of $300,000 on the line in the final quarter. Since Team Giannis led the cumulative score 133–124, in accordance with the rules of the Elam Ending, the teams played to a target score of 157 but without a game clock for the 4th quarter.

Anthony Davis walked-off the final point for Team LeBron on the second of two free throws to win the game, 157–155, in a back-and-forth 4th quarter which featured multiple defensive plays. The Elam Ending format was received well by fans and players alike.

Kawhi Leonard of Team LeBron was awarded the NBA All-Star Game Kobe Bryant Most Valuable Player award.

During the 42nd Sports Emmy Awards, the 2020 NBA All-Star Game won the Outstanding Live Sports Special Emmy for TNT & TBS.

TNT, TBS

February 16, 2020
7:30 pm CT

Recap

Team LeBron 157, Team Giannis 155
Scoring by quarter: 53–41, 30–51, 41–41, 33–22
Pts: Kawhi Leonard 30; Rebs: Anthony Davis 9 Asts: three player 6 each	Pts: Giannis Antetokounmpo 25; Rebs: Antetokounmpo, Gobert 11 each Asts: Trae Young 10

United Center, Chicago, Illinois
Attendance: 17,808
Referees:
- #8 Marc Davis
- #42 Eric Lewis
- #61 Courtney Kirkland

== All-Star Weekend ==
=== NBA on TNT American Express Road Show ===
The 2020 NBA All Star Weekend began on Thursday, February 13, 2020, with the annual NBA on TNT American Express Road Show, along with a live broadcast of Inside the NBA that took place in Chicago, Illinois and was hosted by Ernie Johnson, Charles Barkley, Kenny Smith and Shaquille O'Neal with live special performances by Anderson .Paak (Thursday) and Maroon 5 (Saturday).

=== Celebrity Game ===
The 2020 NBA All-Star Celebrity Game was played on Friday, February 14, 2020, at the Wintrust Arena in Chicago, Illinois. The coaches for the 2020 game were First Take analyst Stephen A. Smith and Pardon the Interruption co-host Michael Wilbon. Team Wilbon defeated Team Stephen A. 62–47 and Common took home the MVP award with 10 points, 5 rebounds and 5 assists.

Nate Robinson joined Team Stephen A. for the second half, while Horace Grant joined Team Wilbon. Former Secretary of Education Arne Duncan was a late addition to Team Wilbon. Smith also received the first technical for a head coach in Celebrity Game History.

ESPN

February 14, 2020
7:00 pm ET

Team Stephen A. 47, Team Wilbon 62

Wintrust Arena, Chicago, Illinois

Team Stephen A.
Player	Background
Ronnie 2K (2)	Marketing director at 2K Sports
Anthony "Spice" Adams	AKA Cream E. Biggums, actor, comedian, former NFL defensive tackle
Taylor Bennett	Rapper, recording artist
LaRoyce Hawkins	Actor (Chicago P.D.)
Lil Rel Howery	Actor, comedian
Marc Lasry (5)	Milwaukee Bucks co-owner
Darius Miles	Former NBA player
Katelyn Ohashi	Gymnast
Quavo (3)	Rapper, recording artist
Chance the Rapper	Rapper, recording artist
A'ja Wilson (2)	WNBA player
Head coach: Stephen A. Smith (ESPN commentator)
Assistant coach: Guy Fieri (TV host and chef)

Team Wilbon
Player	Background
Chef José Andrés	Chef & humanitarian
Jon Batiste	Musician, bandleader (The Late Show with Stephen Colbert)
Kane Brown	4x AMA award-winning artist
Bad Bunny (2)	Rapper
Hannibal Buress	Actor, comedian
Common (8)	Rapper, recording artist
Chelsea Gray	WNBA player
Jidenna	Recording artist
Famous Los (2)	Comedian, social media influencer
Alex Moffat	Actor and comedian (Saturday Night Live)
Quentin Richardson (2)	Former NBA player
Head coach: Michael Wilbon (ESPN commentator)
Assistant coach: Jesse Williams (Actor (Grey's Anatomy))

=== Rising Stars Challenge ===
Team World
Pos.	Nat.	Player	Team	R/S
G	(Canada)	Nickeil Alexander-Walker	New Orleans Pelicans	Rookie
C	(The Bahamas)	Deandre Ayton^{INJ3}	Phoenix Suns	Sophomore
G/F	(Canada)	RJ Barrett	New York Knicks	Rookie
F	(Canada)	Brandon Clarke	Memphis Grizzlies	Rookie
G/F	(Slovenia)	Luka Dončić	Dallas Mavericks	Sophomore
G	(Canada)	Shai Gilgeous-Alexander	Oklahoma City Thunder	Sophomore
F	(Japan)	Rui Hachimura	Washington Wizards	Rookie
G	(Nigeria)	Josh Okogie	Minnesota Timberwolves	Sophomore
G/F	(Ukraine)	Svi Mykhailiuk	Detroit Pistons	Sophomore
C	(Germany)	Moritz Wagner	Washington Wizards	Sophomore
F	(Italy)	Nicolò Melli^{REP3}	New Orleans Pelicans	Rookie
Head coach: Adrian Griffin (Toronto Raptors)

Team USA
Pos.	Player	Team	R/S
F	Miles Bridges	Charlotte Hornets	Sophomore
G	Devonte' Graham	Charlotte Hornets	Sophomore
C	Wendell Carter Jr.^{INJ1}	Chicago Bulls	Sophomore
G	Tyler Herro^{INJ2}	Miami Heat	Rookie
G	Ja Morant	Memphis Grizzlies	Rookie
F	Jaren Jackson Jr.	Memphis Grizzlies	Sophomore
F	Zion Williamson^{REP1}	New Orleans Pelicans	Rookie
G	Kendrick Nunn	Miami Heat	Rookie
F	Eric Paschall	Golden State Warriors	Rookie
F	P. J. Washington	Charlotte Hornets	Rookie
G	Trae Young	Atlanta Hawks	Sophomore
G	Collin Sexton^{REP2}	Cleveland Cavaliers	Sophomore
Head coach: Phil Handy (Los Angeles Lakers)

^INJ1 Wendell Carter Jr. was unable to participate due to a right ankle injury.
^REP1 Zion Williamson was selected as Wendell Carter Jr.'s replacement.
^INJ2 Tyler Herro was unable to participate due to a sore right ankle.
^REP2 Collin Sexton was selected as Tyler Herro's replacement.
^INJ3 Deandre Ayton was unable to participate due to a sore left ankle.
^REP3 Nicolò Melli was selected as Deandre Ayton's replacement.

TNT

February 14
9:00 pm ET

Boxscore

Team World 131, Team USA 151
Scoring by half: 81–71, 50–80
Pts: RJ Barrett 27; Rebs: Brandon Clarke 8 Asts: three player 5	Pts: Eric Paschall 23; Rebs: Jaren Jackson Jr. 7 Asts: Trae Young 7

United Center, Chicago
Referees:
- #54 Ray Acosta
- #64 Justin Van Duyne
- #62 JB DeRosa

=== Skills Challenge ===
Contestants
Pos.	Player	Team	Height	Weight
F	Bam Adebayo	Miami Heat	6–9	255
G	Patrick Beverley	Los Angeles Clippers	6–1	180
G	Spencer Dinwiddie	Brooklyn Nets	6–6	215
G	Shai Gilgeous-Alexander^{REP}	Oklahoma City Thunder	6–5	181
F	Khris Middleton	Milwaukee Bucks	6–7	222
G	Derrick Rose^{INJ}	Detroit Pistons	6–2	200
C	Domantas Sabonis	Indiana Pacers	6–11	240
F	Pascal Siakam	Toronto Raptors	6–9	230
F	Jayson Tatum	Boston Celtics	6–8	210

^INJ Derrick Rose was unable to participate due to an adductor strain.
^REP Shai Gilgeous-Alexander was selected as Derrick Rose's replacement.

Quarterfinals
Spencer Dinwiddie (Brooklyn)	X
Bam Adebayo (Miami)	O
Patrick Beverley (LA Clippers)	X
Pascal Siakam (Toronto)	O
Shai Gilgeous-Alexander (Oklahoma City)	X
Khris Middleton (Milwaukee)	O
Jayson Tatum (Boston)	X
Domantas Sabonis (Indiana)	O

Semifinals
Bam Adebayo (Miami)	O
Pascal Siakam (Toronto)	X
Khris Middleton (Milwaukee)	X
Domantas Sabonis (Indiana)	O

Finals
Bam Adebayo (Miami)	O
Domantas Sabonis (Indiana)	X

=== Three Point Contest ===
Contestants
Pos.	Player	Team	Height	Weight	First round	Final round
G	Buddy Hield	Sacramento Kings	6–4	220	27	27
G	Devin Booker	Phoenix Suns	6–5	206	27	26
F	Dāvis Bertāns	Washington Wizards	6–10	225	26	22
G	Zach LaVine	Chicago Bulls	6–6	200	23	DNQ
G/F	Joe Harris	Brooklyn Nets	6–6	220	22	DNQ
F	Duncan Robinson	Miami Heat	6–7	215	19	DNQ
G	Devonte' Graham	Charlotte Hornets	6–1	195	18	DNQ
G	Trae Young	Atlanta Hawks	6–1	180	15	DNQ

=== Slam Dunk Contest ===
Contestants
Pos.	Player	Team	Height	Weight	First round	Final round (Note: Includes two tiebreakers)
F	Derrick Jones Jr.	Miami Heat	6–6	210	96 (46+50)	198 (50+50+50+48)
F	Aaron Gordon	Orlando Magic	6–8	235	100 (50+50)	197 (50+50+50+47)
G	Pat Connaughton	Milwaukee Bucks	6–5	209	95 (45+50)	DNQ
C	Dwight Howard	Los Angeles Lakers	6–10	265	90 (41+49)	DNQ
