= Spoelstra =

Spoelstra is a surname, probably a topographic name meaning 'from the pool' (Frisian), from an agent noun based on Middle Low German pōl '(muddy) pool', with excrescent initial -s. The suffix "-stra" is derived from old Germanic -sater, meaning sitter or dweller. Notable people with the surname include:

- Art Spoelstra (1932–2008), American basketball player
- Erik Spoelstra (born 1970), American basketball player and coach
- Jon Spoelstra (born 1946), American basketball executive
- Mark Spoelstra (1940–2007), American singer-songwriter and guitarist
- Watson Spoelstra (1910–1999), American sportswriter
