= Chris Bosh =

American basketball player (born 1984)

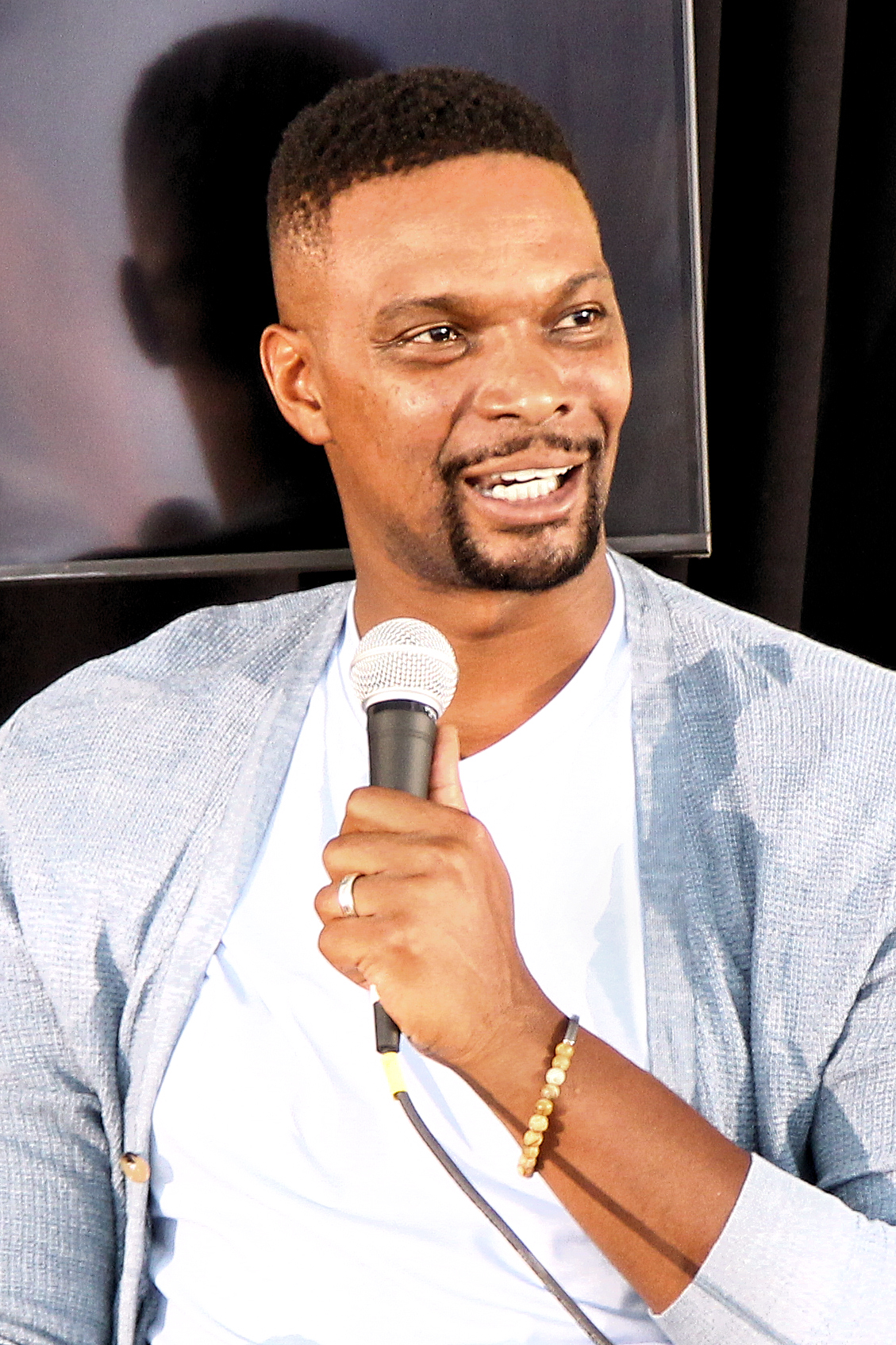
- Bosh in 2022

Personal information
- Born: March 24, 1984 (age 42) Dallas, Texas, U.S.
- Listed height: 6 ft 11 in (2.11 m)
- Listed weight: 235 lb (107 kg)

Career information
- High school: Lincoln (Dallas, Texas)
- College: Georgia Tech (2002–2003)
- NBA draft: 2003: 1st round, 4th overall pick
- Drafted by: Toronto Raptors
- Playing career: 2003–2017
- Position: Power forward / center
- Number: 4, 1

Career history
- 2003–2010: Toronto Raptors
- 2010–2017: Miami Heat

Career highlights
- 2× NBA champion (2012, 2013); 11× NBA All-Star (2006–2016); All-NBA Second Team (2007); NBA All-Rookie First Team (2004); No. 1 retired by Miami Heat; Second-team All-ACC (2003); ACC Rookie of the Year (2003); First-team Parade All-American (2002); McDonald's All-American (2002); Texas Mr. Basketball (2002)

Career statistics
- Points: 17,189 (19.2 ppg)
- Rebounds: 7,592 (8.5 rpg)
- Assists: 1,795 (2.0 apg)
- Stats at NBA.com
- Stats at Basketball Reference
- Basketball Hall of Fame
Medals
Men's basketball
Representing the United States
Olympic Games
Gold medal – first place	2008 Beijing	Team competition
FIBA World Championship
Bronze medal – third place	2006 Japan	Team competition
FIBA Americas U18 Championship
Bronze medal – third place	2002 Isla Margarita	Team competition

Christopher Wesson Bosh (born March 24, 1984) is an American former professional basketball player. A Texas Mr. Basketball in high school, he played one season of college basketball for Georgia Tech before declaring for the 2003 NBA draft, where he was selected fourth overall by the Toronto Raptors. Bosh is considered to be one of the greatest power forwards for the Raptors, and one of the best players of his generation.

With the Raptors, Bosh became a five-time NBA All-Star, was named to the All-NBA Second Team once, played for the U.S. national team (with whom he won a gold medal at the 2008 Summer Olympics), and supplanted former fan favorite Vince Carter as the face and leader of the Raptors franchise. In the 2006–07 season, Bosh led Toronto to their first playoff appearance in five years and their first-ever division title. He left the Raptors in 2010 as the franchise's all-time leader in points, rebounds, blocks, and minutes played.

In 2010, after seven seasons with the Raptors, Bosh entered into a sign-and-trade deal whereby he was traded to the Miami Heat. In Miami, he joined fellow stars Dwyane Wade and LeBron James; the trio became known as the Big Three. Bosh spent the second half of his career with the Heat, appearing in the NBA Finals each year from 2011 to 2014 and winning NBA titles in 2012 and 2013. Bosh made the NBA All-Star team every year during his time in Miami. Bosh's career was cut short by a blood clotting condition that the NBA ruled to be a career-ending illness. He played his final NBA game on February 9, 2016. Notwithstanding the NBA's ruling, Bosh fought to resume his playing career for three years before announcing in February 2019 that he intended to retire. The same year, the Heat retired Bosh's No. 1 jersey. He has been inducted into the Basketball Hall of Fame twice: in 2021 for his individual career, and in 2025 as a member of the Redeem Team.

Seeking to promote sports and education amongst youths in Dallas and Toronto, Bosh set up the Chris Bosh Foundation and regularly speaks to youths about the benefits of reading.

== Early life ==
Born to Noel and Freida Bosh in Dallas, Texas, on March 24, 1984, Bosh was raised in Hutchins, a suburb of the city. A family-oriented person, he would often play basketball in the house with his younger brother, Joel. At the early age of four years old, Bosh started learning how to dribble a basketball in the gym where his father played pick-up games. Since Bosh was always tall for his age, he was accustomed to out-rebounding his peers whenever he played. However, Bosh only started learning the game of basketball seriously around fourth grade, doing so at a playground near his grandmother's house.

As a child, Bosh participated in karate and gymnastics. He also played baseball up until high school, chiefly as a first baseman according to his preference.

Growing up, Bosh names his parents as the biggest influence on his personality and considered NBA superstar Kevin Garnett as his favorite athlete, after whom Bosh modeled his play. Academically, Bosh always excelled in school, as he was a member of the National Honor Society and several student engineering organizations.

Bosh began garnering significant attention from college recruiters after leading Lincoln High School in Dallas to the top ranking in the country and to the USA Today National Championship with a perfect 40–0 season.

Bosh helped Lincoln High capture the Class 4A state title after delivering 23 points and 17 rebounds to go along with nine blocks. Bosh was subsequently named High School Player of the Year by Basketball America; Powerade Player of the Year in Texas; a first-team All-American by Parade, McDonald's, and EA Sports; a second-team all-American by USA Today and SLAM Magazine; a first-team all-state player; and "Mr. Basketball" in Texas by the Texas Association of Basketball Coaches. With his combination of grades and basketball skills, Bosh's name was on a number of college recruiting lists. The University of Florida and University of Memphis among them made serious overtures, but it was Paul Hewitt, coach of Georgia Tech, who made the best impression. Bosh felt that Hewitt had his best interests at heart and respected his aspiration to play professionally; moreover, Bosh was sufficiently impressed by what he saw of Georgia Tech's transition offense.

== College career ==
Bosh eventually chose to follow the footsteps of his cousin and aunt and attended Georgia Tech to study graphic design and computer imaging, and subsequently, management. There, Bosh led the Yellow Jackets in averaging 15.6 points, 9.0 rebounds and 2.2 blocks in 31 games, and led the Atlantic Coast Conference in field goal percentage (.560), joining Antawn Jamison as the only freshmen ever to do so. Bosh originally intended to complete his degree, but by the end of the 2002–03 season, Bosh was convinced that he was ready for the NBA due to his strong performances. Bosh left Georgia Tech after his freshman season and entered the 2003 NBA draft. Bosh said in future interviews that although he misses his college days, he believes he made the right decision to pursue a professional basketball career.

== Professional career ==
=== Toronto Raptors (2003–2010) ===
==== Rookie year (2003–2004) ====
In what is widely regarded as one of the strongest draft classes in NBA history, which included future All-Stars LeBron James, Carmelo Anthony, and Dwyane Wade, Bosh was selected fourth overall by the Toronto Raptors in the 2003 NBA draft and was signed on July 8, 2003. However, prior to his signing, other NBA teams made offers for Bosh as they knew Toronto needed a veteran scorer, and Raptors star Vince Carter himself pressed for a trade. General Manager Glen Grunwald turned everyone down.

In his rookie season, Bosh was forced to play out of position as the Raptors' starting center after Antonio Davis was traded to the Chicago Bulls. Night after night, the teenager with the "slim frame" battled against opponents who had a significant size and strength advantage over him. Bosh—who cited teammate Michael Curry as his mentor—was often praised by his coaches for his heart, and willingness to play through pain and injuries resulting from his lack of body strength compared to some of the league's strong forwards and centers. Bosh's contributions were not unnoticed by teammates either, as he averaged 11.5 points, 7.4 rebounds, 1.4 blocks, and 33.5 minutes in 75 games, leading all rookies in rebounding and blocks, and setting a franchise record for most rebounds in a rookie season with 557. Bosh was rewarded by being selected to the NBA All-Rookie First Team for the 2003–04 season.

==== Heralded as the new hope (2004–2006) ====
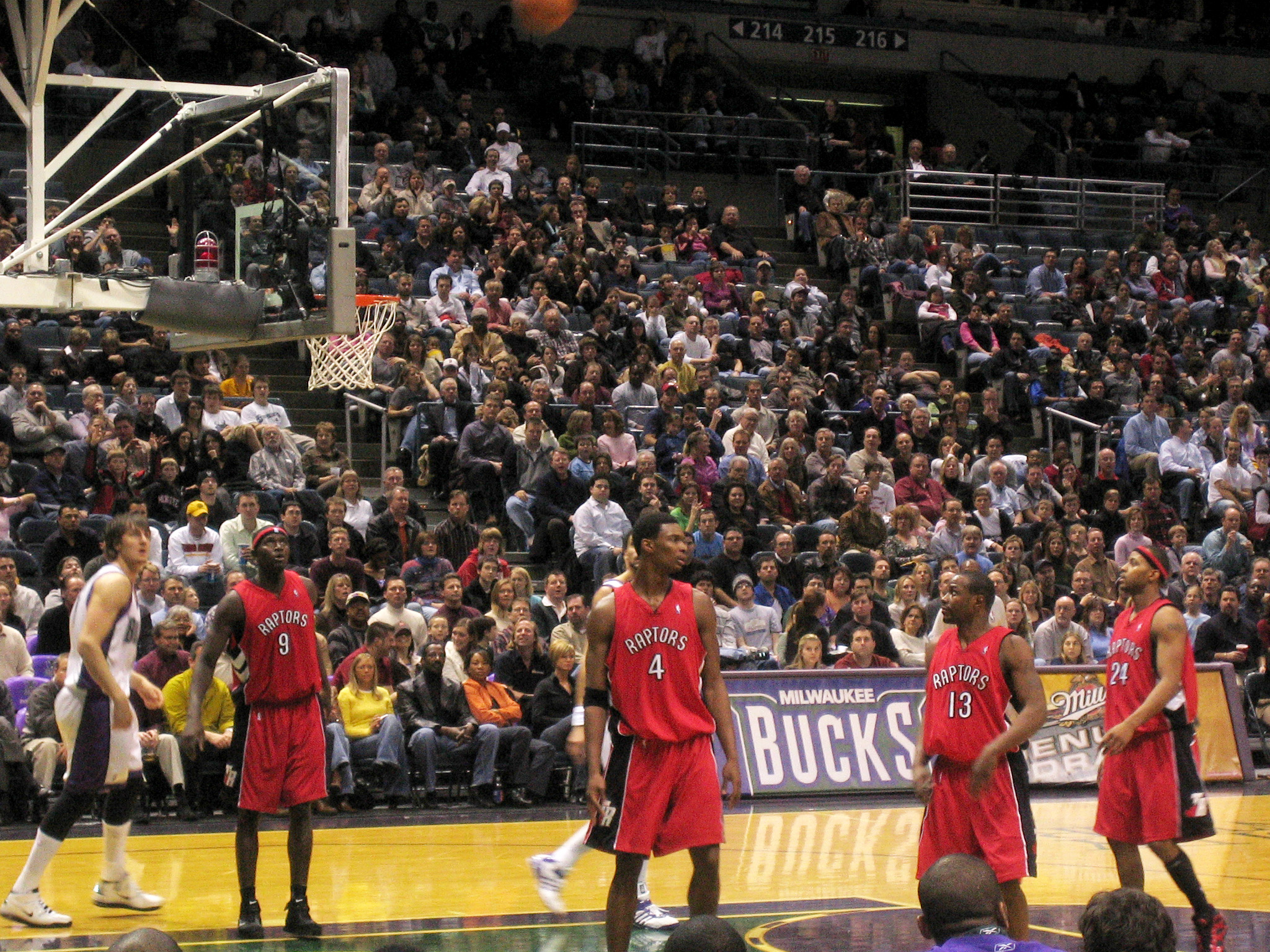
Bosh and his teammates in a 2005–06 game against the Milwaukee Bucks. From left: Pape Sow, Bosh, Mike James, and Morris Peterson.

With the departure of the disenchanted franchise face of the team, Vince Carter, in December 2004, Bosh was simultaneously anointed as the new leader around whom Toronto would build. In the remaining games following Carter's departure, the power forward averaged 18.4 points, 9.5 rebounds, 1.6 blocks, and 38.1 minutes per game, improving in every major statistical category. Bosh was awarded his first ever NBA Eastern Conference Player of the Week for games played between January 3 and 9, 2005. As the season drew to a close, analysts predicted that Bosh would become an All-Star one day. He finished the 2004–05 season as the leading scorer and leading rebounder for the team on 21 and 46 occasions respectively.

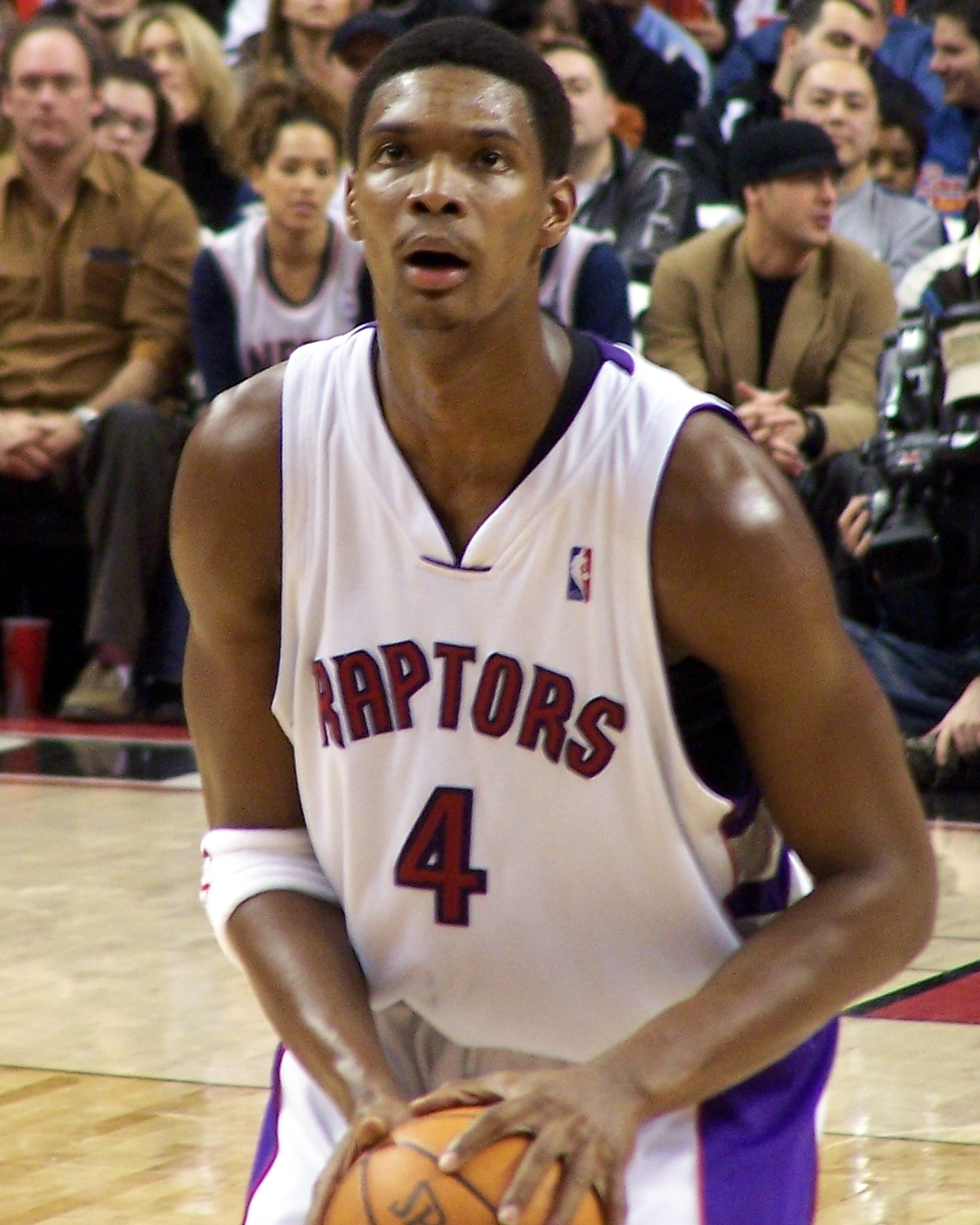
Bosh shooting a free throw during a game in the 2005–06 season

Prior to the 2005–06 season, Bosh was named as one of Toronto's team captains. Bosh continued to work on his game as he consistently chalked up double-doubles, leading the team in scoring, rebounding, and field goal percentage for the first half of the season. On February 9, 2006, for the first time in his career, Bosh was selected to play in the 2006 NBA All-Star Game in Houston, Texas as a reserve forward for the Eastern Conference. He was only the third Raptor to make an All-Star game, after Carter and Antonio Davis. Bosh's selection was just three days after being named NBA Eastern Conference Player of the Week for the second time in his career. In March 2006, following a season-ending injury to Bosh, the Raptors hit a 1–10 skid. This highlighted Bosh's importance as the centerpiece of the offense, as well as the leader of the team. The Raptors finished the season 27–55 and Bosh averaged 22.5 points, 9.2 rebounds, and 2.6 assists per game.

==== Leader of the division champions (2006–2007) ====
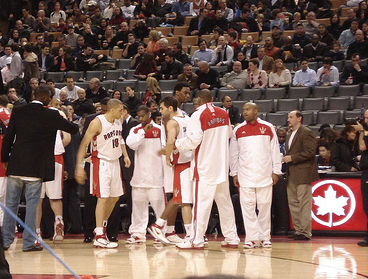
Bosh improved his numbers in ppg and rpg in the 2006–07 season and had to lead a vastly different team from the 2005–06 roster

Despite a major off-season revamp of the Raptors roster—including the departure of good friends Mike James and Charlie Villanueva—Bosh officially signed a three-year contract extension with a player option for a fourth year on July 14, 2006. The deal was reportedly worth $65 million over four years. Upon signing the contract, Bosh said, "I think the future is very positive for the franchise... change was needed... we have a lot of guys who just want to win and are willing to work hard." During the same press conference, Bosh also announced a donation of $1 million to a Toronto charity, known as Community Legacy Programs.

After a rocky start to the Raptors' 2006–07 campaign, the Raptors managed to surpass the .500 mark as the All-Star break approached. Bosh's play and leadership were pivotal to this run and as an increasing recognition of his abilities. On January 25, 2007, Bosh was named an All-Star starter for the East in the 2007 NBA All-Star Game. He received the second highest number of votes among all Eastern Conference forwards. This was Bosh's first All-Star start and second overall All-Star appearance, having averaged over 22 points and 11 rebounds in the first half of the season. On January 31, 2007, in a game against the Washington Wizards, Bosh scored a 65-foot (20 m) buzzer-beating shot to end the third quarter. He shot 15-of-15 after missing his first four shots. Bosh's in-form streak enabled him to be selected Eastern Conference Player of the Month for January 2007. He had averaged 25.4 points and 9.1 rebounds while leading the Raptors to a 10–5 record in that month. On February 7, 2007, Bosh's career-high 41 points prompted the home fans to chant "MVP"—an unprecedented event in the Air Canada Centre. Two days later, Bosh collected 29 points and 11 rebounds against the Los Angeles Lakers, shooting 10-of-10 in the second half.

On March 28, 2007, Bosh became the new franchise record holder for double-doubles in a home win against the Miami Heat. He was named Eastern Conference Player of the Week for the third time in his career shortly after, having led Toronto to clinch a playoff berth for the first time in five years. Toronto went on to win its first ever division title, and concluded the regular season with a 47–35 record, including a 30–11 home record, both franchise records. As the third seed, the Raptors played sixth seed New Jersey Nets in the first round of the 2007 NBA playoffs. The series drew much media attention as Carter, who had left Toronto under acrimonious circumstances, was back at the ACC as a Net. Toronto's inexperience was evident as they struggled offensively throughout the game, to eventually lose 96–91. The Raptors won Game 2 at the ACC to tie the series 1–1, as Bosh recorded 25 points and a game-high 13 rebounds. The Nets won Games 3 and 4 to lead 3–1, but Toronto forced Game 6 when they narrowly won Game 5 by a score of 98–96. The Nets went on to clinch the series with a win in Game 6. Bosh averaged a double-double with 22.6 points per game and 10.7 rebounds per game for the regular season, both career-highs, and posted 17.5 points per game and 9.0 rebounds per game in the playoffs. He was named to the All-NBA Second Team at the end of the 2006–07 campaign.

==== Struggles (2007–2009) ====
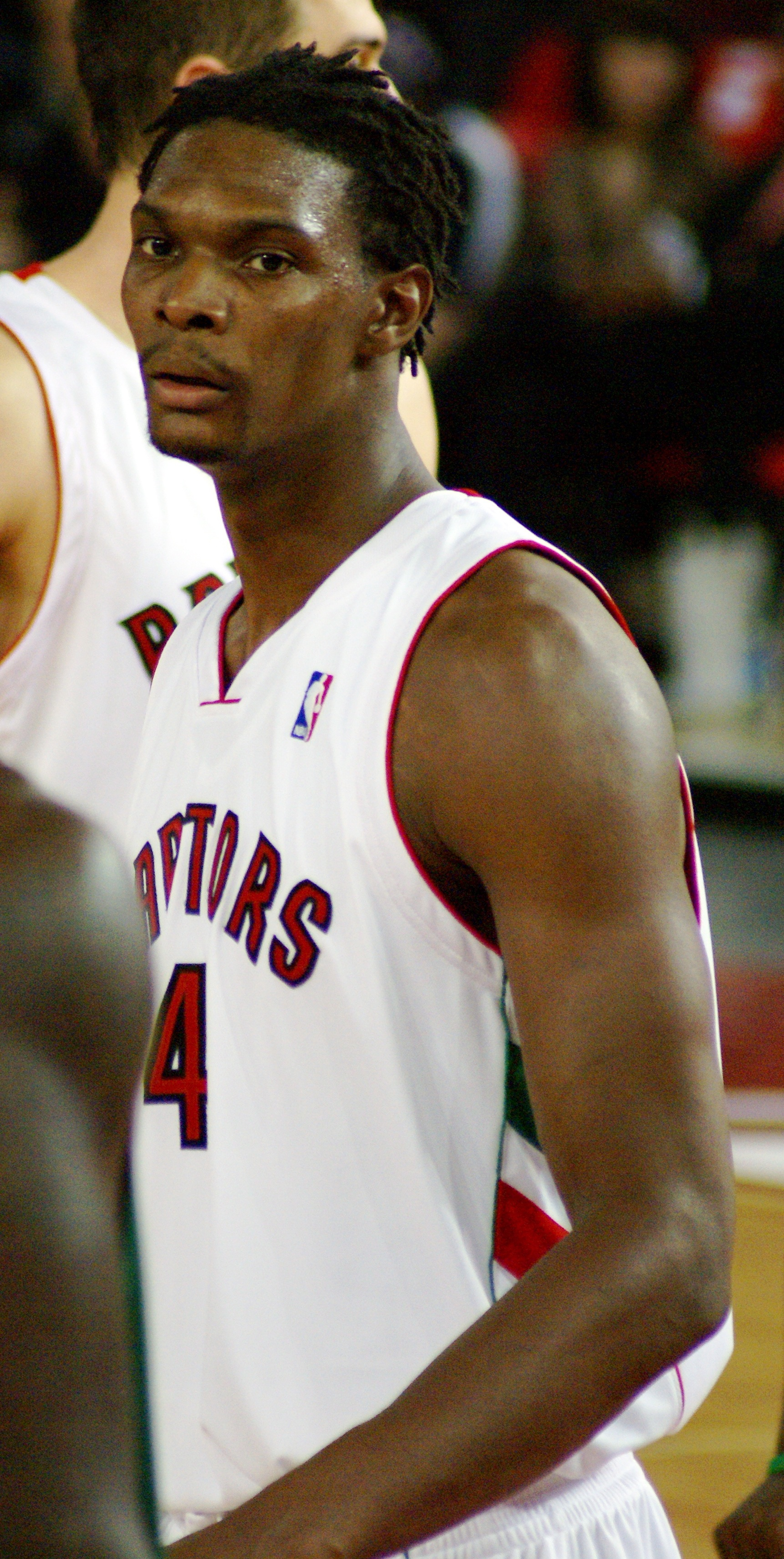
Bosh in 2007

Before the 2007–08 season began, Andrea Bargnani, the number one pick in the 2006 NBA draft, was slated to start at center and Bosh at power forward to form a strong Toronto frontcourt and Jason Kapono, a three-point specialist, was acquired via free agency from the Miami Heat to add offensive firepower. However, as the season unfolded, neither plan materialized as hoped. Bosh himself had a slow start to the season, but as mid-season approached, his form picked up and he was named Player of the Week for the second week of January. On January 31, 2008, Bosh was selected to be on the Eastern Conference team for the 2008 NBA All-Star Game. He missed 15 games throughout the season, but the Raptors still managed to conclude the regular season with a 41–41 record, thus clinching the sixth seed in the Eastern Conference for the 2008 NBA playoffs. However, they were defeated by the Orlando Magic in the first round, losing 4–1.

The first-round series against the Magic was touted as the matchup between two of the league's best young big men in Bosh and Dwight Howard. Howard dominated throughout the series, while Bosh had a series-best effort in game 4 with 39 points and 15 rebounds. General Manager Bryan Colangelo said at a press conference after the series, "Whether it's protecting [Bosh] inside the paint, getting a little bit more of a presence in there, to just getting him another scorer that's going to shoulder some of that burden, it's something that's clear we have to get better", hinting that the roster was in need of an overhaul. After the loss, Bosh said, "They played a great series, they executed on offence and defense better than we did and when it came to the small things, they did a better job... I can't sit here and bark in protest that the better team didn't win. That's pretty obvious. They beat us pretty good." Unlike the previous campaign, Bosh was not named to any of the All-NBA teams.

To provide Bosh with an experienced frontcourt partner, the Raptors pulled a blockbuster trade prior to the 2008–09 campaign: six-time All-Star Jermaine O'Neal was acquired from the Indiana Pacers. Bosh—who had won an Olympic gold medal with the national team at Beijing 2008—started the season strong. He averaged 26 points, 10 rebounds and 3.7 assists in his first three games and was named Eastern Conference Player of the Week for the fifth time in his career. A week later, he became Toronto's all-time leader in offensive rebounds, surpassing Antonio Davis's record. While Bosh and O'Neal formed a formidable partnership in the frontcourt, the Raptors struggled to surpass the .500 mark. The principal deficiency of previous campaigns—wing players—continued to upend Toronto's progress. With the Raptors at 8–9, head coach Sam Mitchell was sacked and replaced by Jay Triano. Despite the move, injuries and weaknesses in the roster meant that the Raptors entered the All-Star break 13 games under .500. On January 29, 2009, Bosh was named an All-Star reserve, but an injury ruled him out of the game. Two weeks later, in a bid to bring in a wing player and create greater salary flexibility, O'Neal and Jamario Moon were traded to Miami for Shawn Marion and Marcus Banks. However, the trade did not improve the team's win–loss record, and the Raptors were eliminated from contention with seven games of the regular season remaining. The bright spark in Bosh's campaign was his career-high 22.7 points per game, as well as him being one of two players in the league that season (the other being Dwight Howard) to average a 20/10 in points and rebounds. On April 20, 2009, Colangelo announced that he would offer Bosh a contract extension during the summer, which Bosh later refused to sign.

==== Overhauling the roster (2009–2010) ====
To prepare for the 2009–10 season, Bosh worked out under Ken Roberson, looking to add 20 pounds (9 kg) and bring his weight up to 250 lb (110 kg). Following the failure of the 2008–09 campaign, Colangelo knew that he had to shake up the roster to persuade Bosh to stay, and the Raptors were one of the busiest teams in the pre-season market. They opened their season with a win against the heavily favored Cleveland Cavaliers, in which Bosh scored 21 points and pulled down 16 rebounds. Bosh went on a tear, averaging 25.4 points and 11.9 rebounds in the first 16 games, but the Raptors were only able to win seven of those games. The Raptors crossed into 2010 with a 16–17 record, and on January 3, 2010, Bosh overtook Vince Carter as Toronto's all-time leader in total points scored. After pulling together a string of wins, the Raptors were .500 after 40 games. Bosh was the league leader in double-doubles at the time, being only one of two players in the league who averaged at least 20 points and 10 rebounds a game. On January 20, 2010, he scored a career-high 44 points in a loss against the Milwaukee Bucks, while collecting his 220th career double-double. That same month, Bosh was named a reserve for the Eastern Conference All-Star team, and was Eastern Conference Player of the Week. After the All-Star break, the Raptors went on several losing streaks and an injury to Bosh exacerbated the situation. As the regular season came to a close, the Raptors went from being the fifth seed before the All-Star break to fighting for the eighth and final playoff spot with the Chicago Bulls. After recording his 44th double-double on March 22, 2010, Bosh became the Raptors' all-time leader in number of double-doubles in a season. On April 5, 2010, he was named the Eastern Conference Player of the Week, winning the honor for the seventh time in his career (tying Carter for the most in franchise history). However, Bosh was unable to play in a pivotal match against the Bulls on April 11, 2010. The blowout loss cost Toronto their tie-breaker and ultimately the eighth seed, as the Bulls finished with 41 wins to Toronto's 40.

=== Miami Heat (2010–2017) ===
==== Joining the Heat and debut season (2010–2011) ====
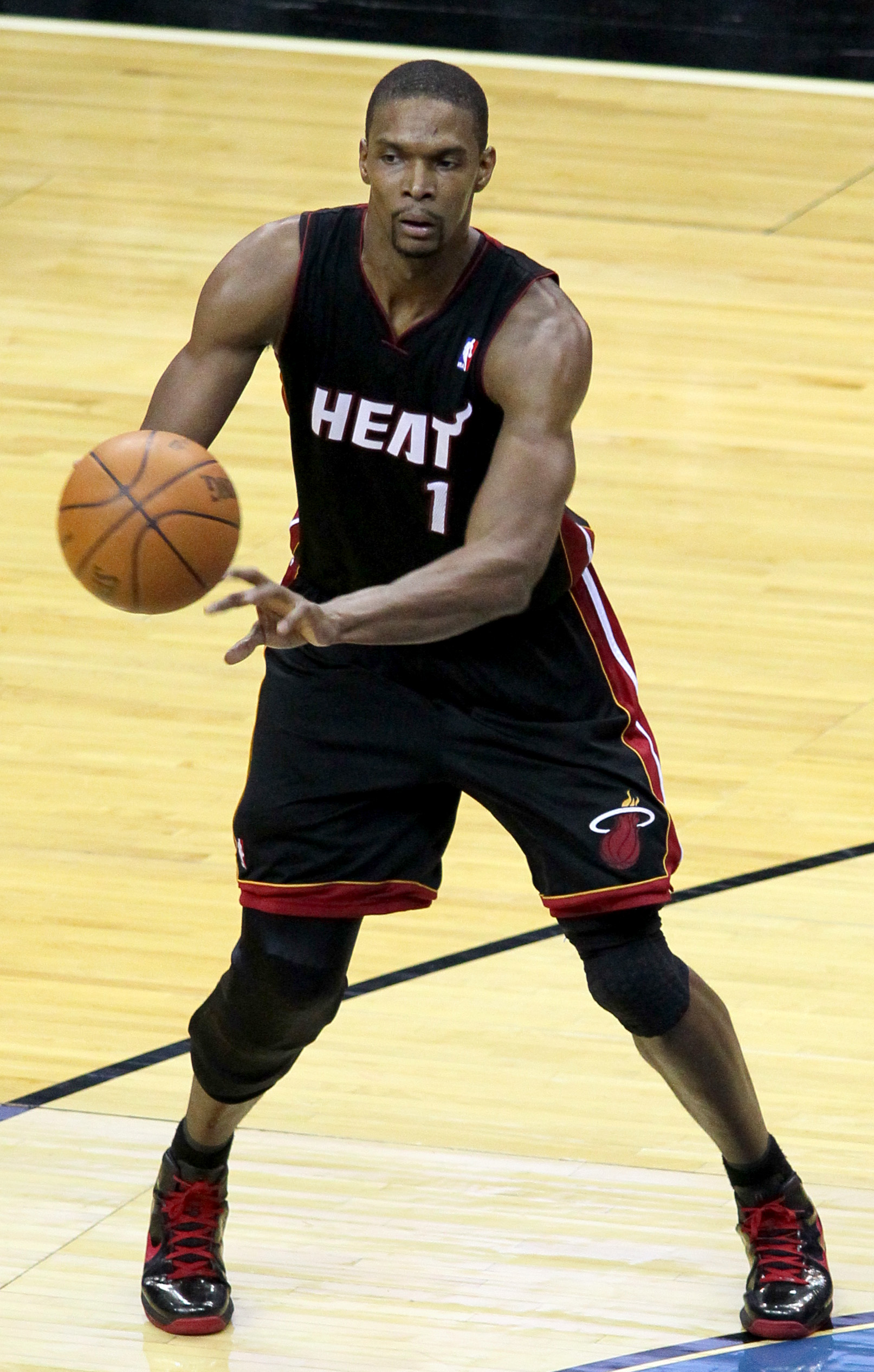
Bosh in 2010

After the 2009–10 season was over, there was much speculation over whether coveted free agents such as LeBron James, Dwyane Wade, and Bosh would sign with new teams for the 2010–11 season. Bosh was active on the social media front, posting his thoughts on Twitter and having a documentary crew record his meetings with the teams interested in signing him. On July 10, 2010, Bosh signed a six-year, $110 million contract with the Miami Heat through a sign-and-trade deal, which sent two 2011 first-round draft picks to the Raptors (Norris Cole and Jonas Valančiūnas were later selected). Bosh was a part of the first player-created NBA superteam. His parting message to the Raptors on his website said, "[K]now that this was my toughest decision, mostly because Toronto has been so great to me. I've loved every minute here and I just wanted to thank you from the bottom of my heart..." Not only did Bosh leave Toronto as its all-time leader in virtually all major statistical categories, but he was also one of only three players in the league who accrued 10,000 points, 4,500 rebounds, and 600 blocks during his seven seasons with the Raptors.

Due to the presence of Wade and James, Bosh's scoring average decreased from 24.0 points per game to 16.6, and was only involved in 23 percent of the Heat's possessions compared to 30 percent in his last season with the Raptors. Despite being widely tipped as contenders, the Heat got off to a tentative 9–8 start. However, the Heat managed to go on to compile a 21–1 record and were jostling with the Boston Celtics and Chicago Bulls for pole position in the Eastern Conference as mid-season approached. Miami finished the regular season with 58 wins and faced the Philadelphia 76ers in the first round of the playoffs. Miami won the series in five games, and also prevailed in five games in the semi-finals against Boston. In the Eastern Conference Finals against the Bulls, Bosh was particularly instrumental, averaging 23.2 points in the 4–1 series win. He was slow off the blocks in the NBA Finals against the Dallas Mavericks, shooting below .300 in the first two games, but made the game-winning shot in Game 3 to give Miami a 2–1 lead. That was the last game Miami won, as Dallas won the next three to win its first-ever championship. Bosh was seen in tears as he walked to the locker room following the loss.

==== Consecutive NBA championships (2011–2013) ====
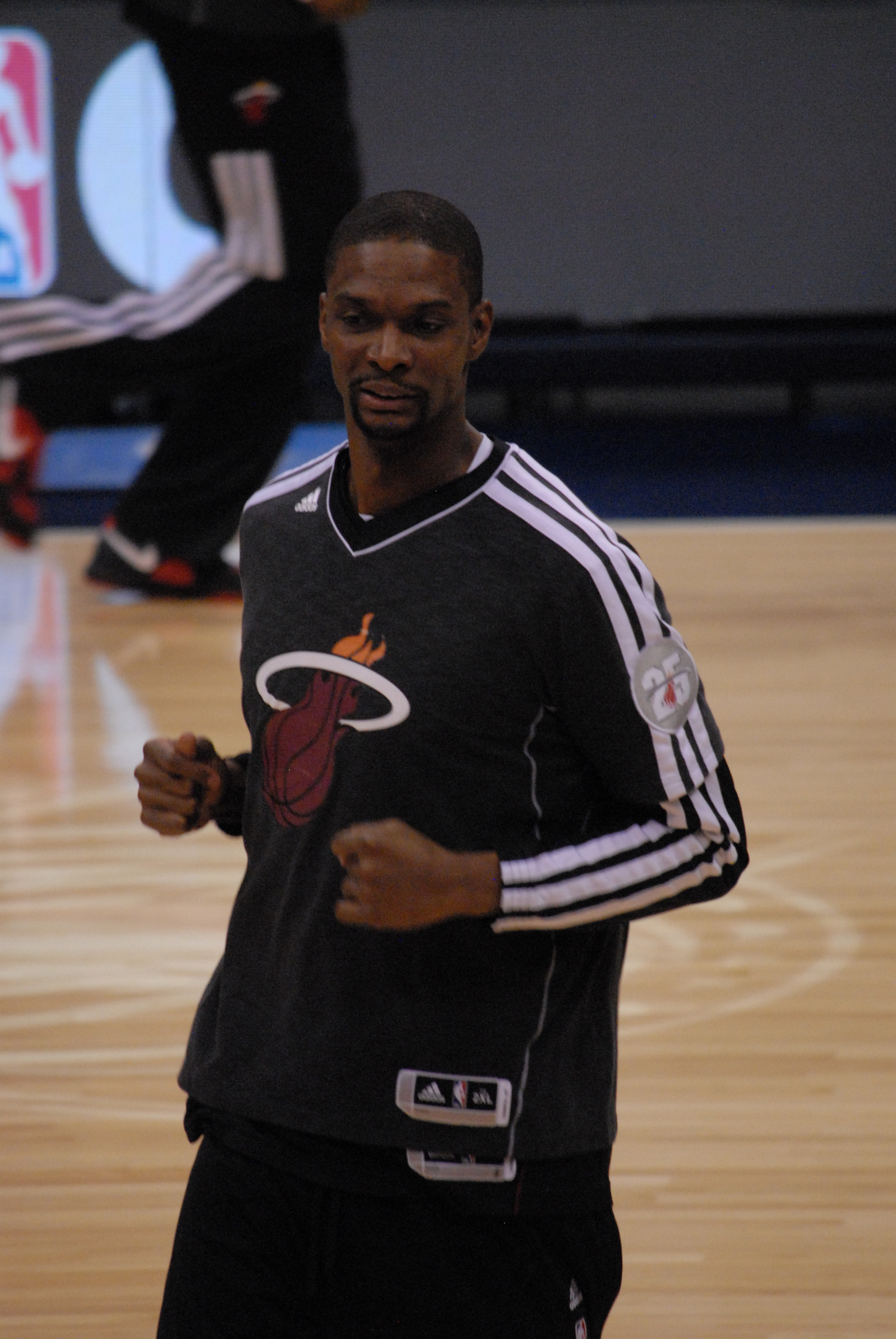
Bosh in a layup line before a game against the Dallas Mavericks in 2012

On January 5, 2012, Bosh led the Heat to a 116–109 triple-overtime victory over the Atlanta Hawks, highlighted by a three-point shot he made to force the game into overtime with 0.6 seconds left to play in the fourth quarter. Bosh finished the game with 33 points, 14 rebounds, five assists, two steals, and two blocked shots. By the end of the season, the Heat had embraced a small-ball strategy that featured Bosh at the center position.

In the playoffs, Bosh averaged 14.0 points and 7.8 rebounds a game. In Game 1 of the Conference Semifinals against the Indiana Pacers, he suffered a lower abdominal strain that forced him to miss the rest of the series and the first four games of the Eastern Conference Finals against Boston. Bosh returned in the Conference Finals against Boston. He was moved to center for the remainder of the playoffs, while James, who had filled in at power forward during his absence, remained at that position. Boston pushed Miami to seven games, and in the final game, Bosh scored 19 points, including 3-of-4 shooting from three-point range, to help the Heat advance to their second straight NBA Finals, this time against the Oklahoma City Thunder. The Thunder won the first game of the series before Miami rolled to a 4–1 victory, giving Bosh his first NBA championship. Bosh scored 24 points in the deciding Game 5 and averaged 14.6 points and 9.4 rebounds in the Finals.

Bosh remained the Heat's starting center for the 2012–13 season. On February 15, 2013, Bosh was picked as an All-Star starter over the injured Rajon Rondo by coach Erik Spoelstra. The Heat achieved the league's best record and swept through the first round of the playoffs against the Milwaukee Bucks before defeating the Bulls in five games, with Bosh recording 20 points and 19 rebounds in a crucial Game 3 victory in Chicago. Bosh averaged 12.1 points per game throughout the playoffs, as the Heat advanced to the NBA Finals to face the San Antonio Spurs following a grueling seven-game series against Indiana. The Heat and Spurs split the first two games before the Spurs blew out Miami in Game 3 to take a 2–1 series lead. In Game 4, Bosh recorded 20 points and 13 rebounds to complement Wade's 32 points and James' 33 points to bolster the Heat's win, tying the series. San Antonio bounced back in Game 5 to force the Heat to win the final two games at home. In the final seconds of Game 6, James missed a three-pointer, and Bosh grabbed the offensive rebound and found a wide-open Ray Allen in the corner; Allen hit the shot to tie the game with 5.2 seconds left. In overtime, the Heat had a three-point lead with seconds left as San Antonio inbounded the ball to Danny Green, who attempted a corner three, but Green's shot was blocked by Bosh to secure the Heat's victory. Bosh was held scoreless in Game 7 by Tim Duncan, but the Heat still won the game and the series to claim their second consecutive NBA championship.

==== Coming up short (2013–2014) ====
In the 2013–14 season, Bosh played and started in 79 games, averaging 16.2 points and 6.6 rebounds per game. He also hit a career-high 74 three-point shots on 33 percent shooting from beyond the arc. In the playoffs, Bosh helped the Heat return to the NBA Finals, where they faced the Spurs once again. However, the Heat were outclassed by the Spurs as they lost the series in five games.

==== Post-Big Three era (2014–2016) ====
On July 30, 2014, after wide speculation that he would join the Houston Rockets, Bosh re-signed with the Heat to a five-year, $118 million contract after LeBron James announced that he was leaving Miami to return to the Cleveland Cavaliers. After averaging 21.6 points, 8.2 rebounds, 2.1 assists and 1.1 steals over the first 23 games of the 2014–15 season, Bosh was ruled out indefinitely on December 15 with a calf strain. He went on to miss eight games before returning on December 29 against the Orlando Magic. After playing in the 2015 All-Star Game, Bosh was admitted to a Miami hospital for lung tests during the All-Star break. On February 21, 2015, he was ruled out for the rest of the season due to a blood clot in one of his lungs.

On October 28, 2015, Bosh made his return to the court in the Heat's season opener against the Charlotte Hornets, recording 21 points and 10 rebounds during a 104–94 victory. On November 10, he scored a then season-high 30 points in a 101–88 victory over the Los Angeles Lakers. On December 28, Bosh recorded 24 points and 12 rebounds against the Brooklyn Nets, and hit a career-best 5-of-5 from three-point range. On January 4, 2016, he recorded a season-high 31 points and 11 rebounds in a 103–100 overtime victory over the Indiana Pacers. Though Bosh was voted to play in the 2016 NBA All-Star Game, and selected to compete in the Three-Point Contest, Bosh was forced to withdraw from both due to a calf injury.

A blood clot in his leg again forced Bosh to miss time following the 2016 All-Star break. He faced increasing pressure from physicians and the Heat organization to sit out the rest of the season because of the potential dangers of the recurring medical condition. The Heat finally shut Bosh down for the regular season after their February 9 game against the Spurs; as it turned out, it would be his last NBA game. On May 4, 2016, the Heat announced that Bosh would be held out for the remainder of the playoffs.

==== Comeback attempts and retirement (2016–2019) ====
Bosh was initially optimistic about a return to the Heat for the 2016–17 season, and the organization had become increasingly hopeful that he would be cleared for camp. Those hopes quickly faded due to Bosh's continued issues with blood clotting. In September 2016, Bosh failed his physical exam and was not cleared by the team to participate in training camp. On September 26, 2016, Heat president Pat Riley said that the team viewed Bosh's career with the team as over. In May 2017, Bosh and the Heat reportedly reached a unique agreement in which Bosh would be paid his full salary for the 2017–18 season but that salary would not be counted against Miami's salary cap. Miami also recouped more than 50% of Bosh's paid-out 2016–17 salary through an insurance claim.

On June 2, 2017, the NBA ruled that Bosh's blood clotting issues were a career-ending illness, meaning the Heat would be allowed to remove his contract from their salary cap once they officially released him. Two days later, the Heat announced that they had waived Bosh, ending his seven-year stint with the organization. Following Bosh's release, Pat Riley said, "The number '1' will never be worn by another player and we can't wait to someday hang his jersey in the rafters." In February 2018, Bosh declared himself on the comeback trail, having refused to rule out a return to the NBA.

On February 12, 2019, Bosh announced that he was no longer pursuing his NBA career and that he planned to retire from the NBA when his jersey was retired by the Heat. A month later, on March 26, the Heat retired Bosh's No. 1 jersey before a regular season game against the Orlando Magic. In 2024, Bosh played in Goran Dragić's Farewell Game in Ljubljana, Slovenia.

== NBA career statistics ==
Legend
GP	Games played	GS	Games started	MPG	Minutes per game
FG%	Field goal percentage	3P%	3-point field goal percentage	FT%	Free throw percentage
RPG	Rebounds per game	APG	Assists per game	SPG	Steals per game
BPG	Blocks per game	PPG	Points per game	**Bold**	Career high
†	Won an NBA championship

=== Regular season ===
Year	Team	GP	GS	MPG	FG%	3P%	FT%	RPG	APG	SPG	BPG	PPG
2003–04	Toronto	75	63	33.5	.459	.357	.701	7.4	1.0	.8	**1.4**	11.5
2004–05	Toronto	**81**	**81**	37.2	.471	.300	.760	8.9	1.9	.9	**1.4**	16.8
2005–06	Toronto	70	70	**39.3**	.505	.000	.816	9.2	**2.6**	.7	1.1	22.5
2006–07	Toronto	69	69	38.5	.496	.343	.785	10.7	2.5	.6	1.3	22.6
2007–08	Toronto	67	67	36.2	.494	**.400**	**.844**	8.7	**2.6**	.9	1.0	22.3
2008–09	Toronto	77	77	38.0	.487	.245	.817	10.0	2.5	.9	1.0	22.7
2009–10	Toronto	70	70	36.1	.518	.364	.797	**10.8**	2.4	.6	1.0	**24.0**
2010–11	Miami	77	77	36.3	.496	.240	.815	8.3	1.9	.8	.6	18.7
2011–12†	Miami	57	57	35.2	.487	.286	.821	7.9	1.8	.9	.8	18.0
2012–13†	Miami	74	74	33.2	**.535**	.284	.798	6.8	1.7	.9	**1.4**	16.6
2013–14	Miami	79	79	32.0	.516	.339	.820	6.6	1.1	**1.0**	1.0	16.2
2014–15	Miami	44	44	35.4	.460	.375	.772	7.0	2.2	.9	.6	21.1
2015–16	Miami	53	53	33.5	.467	.365	.795	7.4	2.4	.7	.6	19.1
Career		893	881	35.8	.494	.335	.799	8.5	2.0	.8	1.0	19.2
All-Star		9	3	19.4	.524	.333	.533	5.1	1.1	1.0	.2	10.9

=== Playoffs ===
Year	Team	GP	GS	MPG	FG%	3P%	FT%	RPG	APG	SPG	BPG	PPG
2007	Toronto	6	6	37.0	.396	.200	**.842**	**9.0**	2.5	.8	**1.8**	17.5
2008	Toronto	5	5	**39.8**	.472	.143	.833	**9.0**	**3.6**	**1.6**	.4	**24.0**
2011	Miami	21	21	39.7	.475	.000	.814	8.5	1.1	.7	.9	18.6
2012†	Miami	14	10	31.4	.493	**.538**	.827	7.8	.6	.4	1.0	14.0
2013†	Miami	**23**	**23**	32.7	.458	.405	.733	7.3	1.5	1.0	1.6	12.1
2014	Miami	20	20	34.3	**.507**	.405	.750	5.6	1.1	.9	1.0	14.9
Career		89	85	35.2	.473	.386	.800	7.5	1.3	.8	1.1	15.6

== National team career ==
Bosh grabs a rebound against China at the 2008 Summer Olympics

Bosh's national team career began in 2002 when he was selected as a member of the 2002 USA Basketball Junior World Championship Qualifying Team that finished with a 4–1 record and the bronze medal.

After his NBA career began, Bosh was named in March 2006 to the 2006–2008 United States men's national basketball team program, and helped lead the team to a 5–0 record during its pre-World Championship tour. In August 2006, Bosh was named as a member of the 2006 USA World Championship Team. Together with fellow 2003 draftees Dwyane Wade, LeBron James, Carmelo Anthony, and Kirk Hinrich, this team competed in the 2006 FIBA World Championship. The team won the bronze medal, defeating former 2004 Olympic champion Argentina. Bosh was ranked sixth in field goal percentage.

Following the 2006–07 season, Bosh was named to the team that would compete in the 2007 FIBA Americas Championship. However, he sustained a foot injury and withdrew from the squad. On June 23, 2008, he was named to the team that would compete in the 2008 Olympic Games in Beijing. During the tournament itself, Bosh operated as the main backup to center Dwight Howard as Team USA went unbeaten in all eight games en route to the gold medal, defeating Spain in the final. He averaged 9.1 points per game, and led the team in rebounds with 6.1 a game.

In June 2012, Bosh withdrew his name from consideration for the 2012 Olympics in London to recover from a lower abdominal strain that kept him out of some playoff games.

== Player profile ==
You are not going to see a whole lot of screaming and hollering at guys... He is a guy that is going to pull somebody aside and say it in a positive way, and I think it goes a lot farther that way.

— Anthony Parker on Bosh's leadership

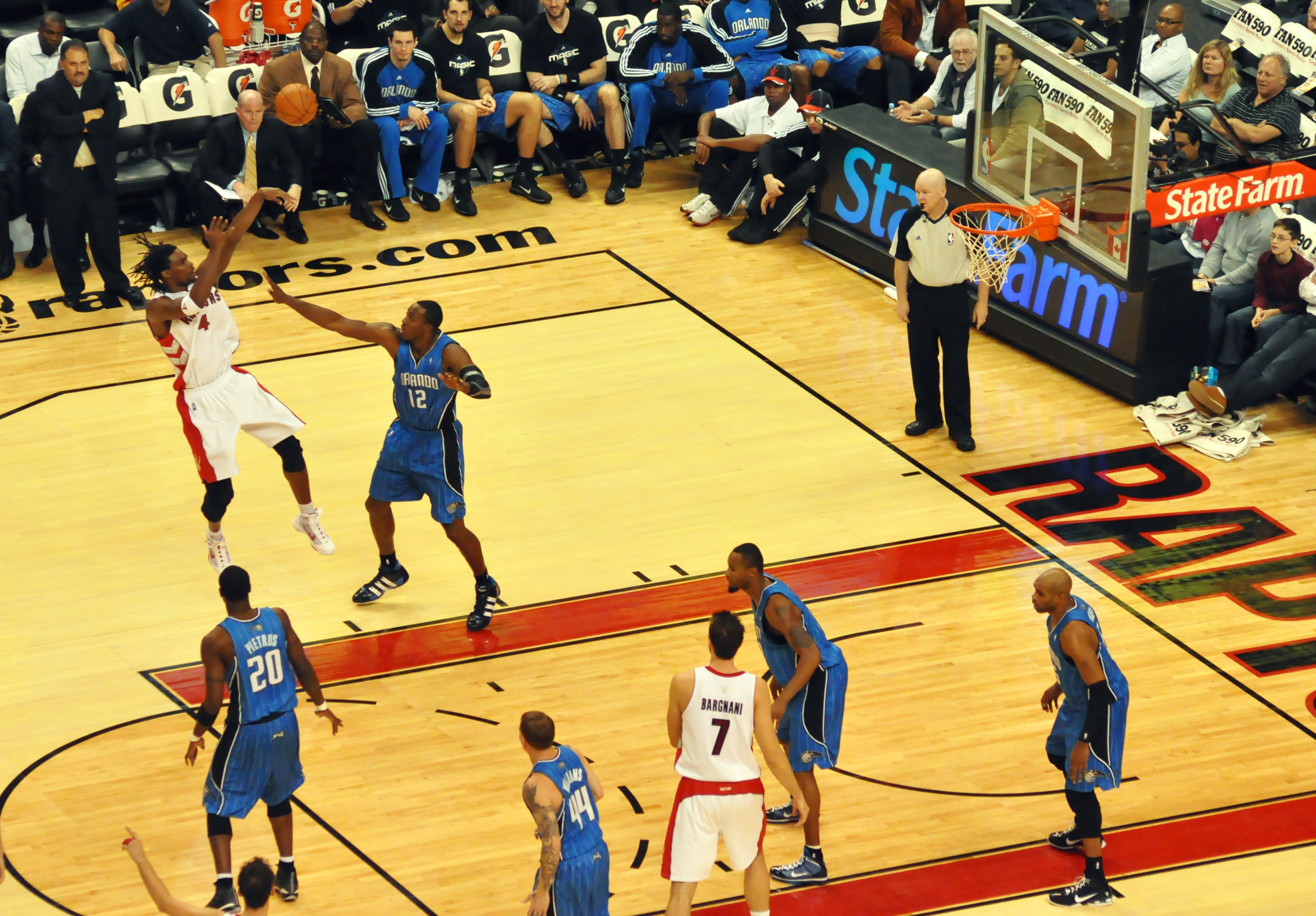
The mid-range jump shot was one of Bosh's trademark moves.

Bosh traditionally played the power forward position, including during his first season with the Miami Heat. However, starting in the 2011–12 season, he began to start at center and played the position during the team's consecutive championships. Listed at 6 feet 11 inches (2.11 m) and 235 pounds (107 kg), Bosh possessed excellent speed, athleticism, and ball handling for a player of his size. Bosh was particularly noted for his ability to drive to the basket and finish strong or get to the free throw line—where he was also proficient, but he was also known for his well-developed jump shot. Indiana Pacers coach Jim O'Brien once commented on the match-up problems Bosh posed for opposing defenders: "We've tried over the years to put big guys on him. It doesn't work. We've tried to put small guys on him. It doesn't seem to work either. I don't know if we have somebody to play Bosh, to tell you the truth." When he was the centerpiece of the Raptors' offense, Bosh was often double teamed, and he was noted to unselfishly pass the ball to teammates who were in better shooting positions. Bosh improved his shooting range when he worked on his three-point shooting during the summer of 2006 and showed improvement in the 2006–07 season. On November 8, 2006, against the Philadelphia 76ers, Bosh hit a game-winning three-point shot with 6.1 seconds left. It was reminiscent of the shot that marked his "arrival" to the NBA in his first season, when Bosh hit a game-tying three-pointer against Houston to send the game to overtime. When the 2006–07 season ended, Bosh had shot .343 from the three-point arc for the season; he improved to .400 the following season. Because of his ability to hit three-pointers, it was during his tenure with the Heat that Bosh began to be relied upon as one of the team's outside shooters, taking multiple three-pointers throughout the 2012 and 2013 championship runs. During the 2013–14 season, Bosh shot and made more three-pointers than at any point during his career, and continued to make crucial shots during the playoffs.

Bosh was noted for his leadership. When he was the leader of the Raptors, Bosh was not known for being vocal on the court, preferring to maintain his quiet and humble demeanor but expecting his teammates to match his work ethic. However, Bosh was also known to deliver stern rebukes to teammates who made bad calls on the court. Throughout his career, comparisons were made between Bosh and Kevin Garnett due to their similar style of play and physique.

== Honors and achievements ==
- NBA Eastern Conference Player of the Month: January 2007
- 9× NBA Eastern Conference Player of the Week: January 3, 2005; January 30, 2006; March 26, 2007; January 7, 2008; October 28, 2008; February 1, 2010; April 5, 2010; December 23, 2013; October 28, 2014
- NBA Atlantic Division champion: 2007
- 4× NBA Southeast Division champion: 2011, 2012, 2013, 2014
- 2× NBA champion: 2012, 2013
- 11× NBA All-Star: 2006, 2007, 2008, 2009, 2010, 2011, 2012, 2013, 2014, 2015, 2016
- All-NBA Second Team: 2007
- NBA All-Rookie Team: 2004
- 2× NBA Rookie All-Star Game: 2004, 2005
- 3× NBA Shooting Stars champion (with Swin Cash and Dominique Wilkins) 2013, 2014, 2015
- Magic Johnson Award: 2010
- Bronze medal winner with Team USA at the 2006 FIBA World Championship
- Gold medal winner with Team USA at the 2008 Summer Olympics
- Third-youngest player in NBA history to record 1,000 rebounds
- Fourth-youngest player in NBA history to record 20 points and 20 rebounds in a game
- Toronto's first player to achieve 10,000 points
- Toronto's all-time leader in rebounds
- Toronto's all-time leader in defensive rebounds
- Toronto's all-time leader in offensive rebounds
- Toronto's all-time leader in rebounds per game
- Toronto's all-time leader in rebounds per game in a season
- Toronto's all-time leader in blocks
- Toronto's all-time leader in free throws made
- Toronto's all-time leader in free throws made in a season
- Toronto's all-time leader in free throws attempted
- Toronto's all-time leader in free throws attempted in a season
- Toronto's all-time leader in double-doubles
- Toronto's all-time leader in double-doubles in a season
- NBA Sportsmanship Award (divisional winner): 2007–08
- Elected to the Naismith Memorial Basketball Hall of Fame

== Off the court ==
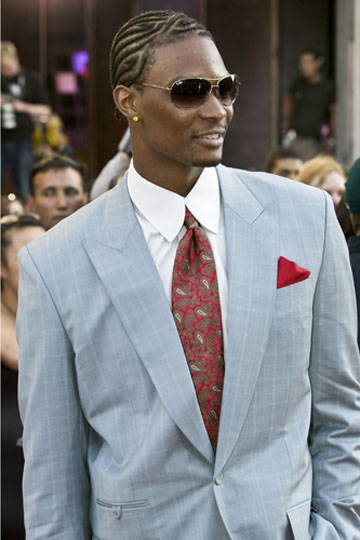
Bosh at the 2007 MuchMusic Video Awards

Besides his on-the-court exploits, Bosh was a National Honor Society member and graduated with honors from Lincoln High School. He is also a member of the National Society of Black Engineers and the Dallas Association of Minority Engineers. Following his success in the NBA, Bosh soon had his own YouTube channel, and has since made various TV appearances. In December 2009, First Ink, a DVD featuring comedic digital shorts and a documentary about Bosh, was released. The DVD was filmed during the summer of 2009. Bosh voiced the Marvel Comics character Heimdall in an episode of Hulk and the Agents of S.M.A.S.H. in 2014. He also made appearances on episodes of Entourage, Jessie, and Parks and Recreation.

In the field of philanthropy, Bosh established the Chris Bosh Foundation in 2004. Remembering the challenges he had faced as a youth, Bosh founded the organization to help younger people in academics and athletics. The Foundation, with programs in Toronto and Dallas, has worked closely with organizations such as the Toronto Special Olympics to raise important funding for community projects. Bosh's mother, Freida, has served as CEO of the Foundation. As an avid reader, Bosh also regularly speaks to groups of children about the benefits of reading, and has received the NBA Community Assist Award for his active contributions for the Raptors community development program in Toronto and Dallas during the course of the NBA campaign. In November 2008, Bosh pledged to donate $75,000 to the Boys and Girls Clubs of Canada. He is also an advocate for increased computer literacy in schools, supporting the non-profit code.org.

On April 9, 2011, Bosh married Adrienne Williams. They renewed their vows on July 16, 2011. The couple have three sons and two daughters.

Bosh has dabbled in hip-hop production. In 2017, alongside record producer, songwriter, and singer Rico Love, Bosh co-produced a song titled "Miss My Woe" by Gucci Mane. The song is featured on Gucci's 11th studio album titled, Mr. Davis.

In June 2021, Bosh published his book, Letters to a Young Athlete.

In August 2026, Bosh revealed that he had suffered a pulmonary embolism in January of that year, saying "I almost dropped dead pretty much and came back to life." and cautioned Spurs forward Victor Wembanyama, who had a season ending blood clot during the 2024-2025 season, to "Take your medicine. Make sure that he's staying on top of his regimen to make sure that doesn't happen again because it only takes one more time. It happened one more time for me, it happened twice, and I couldn't play anymore.

=== Paternity lawsuit ===
On March 24, 2009, it was reported that Bosh's former girlfriend, Allison Mathis, was seeking child support and sole custody of their daughter, Trinity (born November 2, 2008). Mathis alleged that when she was seven months pregnant, Bosh stopped supporting her financially and tried to remove her from their home. Three days later, it was reported that the dispute was only over the amount Bosh paid. Mathis' lawyer also told the press, "My client very much wanted this dispute to remain private. Certainly this thing did not get started by anything on our side... She is very distressed that somehow this thing got into the newspapers. She wants Trinity to have a good relationship with her dad, Chris Bosh, and adverse publicity makes that more difficult."

== See also ==
- Toronto Raptors accomplishments and records
