= First Ink =

- Directed by: Rob Pilichowski
- Written by: Max Sawka
- Produced by: Amin Todai (executive); Chris Bosh (executive); Hadi Teherany (executive); Patricia Tay; Richard Fung; Raj Nandy; Scott Pasko (associate); Jen Woodall (associate)
- Cinematography: John Price
- Edited by: Steve Guise
- Music by: Boi-1da
- Production company: OneMethod Inc.
- Distributed by: Warner Music Canada
- Release date: December 15, 2009
- Running time: 30 minutes
- Country: Canada
- Language: English

First Ink is a DVD featuring comedic digital shorts and a documentary about professional basketball player Chris Bosh. The comedic digital shorts segment, known as CBTV, features a collection of new digital shorts and characters. The new skits are coupled with "classic CBTV" skits, which earned Chris top ranking in ESPN's viral athletes rankings. The documentary segment follows Chris during his time off in the summer before his final season on contract with the Toronto Raptors. The film is approximately 30 minutes long and documents Chris' attempt to transform his body both by gaining weight and muscle and by getting a full back tattoo.

The DVD was released in Canada on December 15, 2009.
