= Baseball Chapel =

Baseball Chapel is an organization that provides Christian chaplains to professional baseball teams. It was founded by Watson Spoelstra in 1973, a former sportswriter in Detroit. All of the major league organizations had a chapel program put in place by 1975, just two years after being founded. In 1978, Baseball chapel expanded to minor league organizations and Latin America. In 2003 Baseball Chapel expanded into Mexico, and in 2004 to Japan. Baseball Chapel has expanded to every major league teams and to all minor league baseball teams. Baseball Chapel currently serves in more than 350 locations in both the United States and Canada.

The four main leaders of Baseball Chapel are Vince Nauss, Rob Crose, Luke Sawyer, and Steve Sisco.
