= 2013 NBA All-Star Game =

Exhibition basketball game

| | 1 | 2 | 3 | 4 | Total |
|---|---|---|---|---|---|
| East | 26 | 39 | 39 | 34 | 138 |
| West | 31 | 38 | 39 | 35 | 143 |
- Date: February 17, 2013
- Arena: Toyota Center
- City: Houston
- MVP: Chris Paul (West)
- National anthem: John Legend (American); Gloria Reuben (Canadian)
- Halftime show: Alicia Keys
- Attendance: 16,101
- Network: TNT
- Announcers: Marv Albert, Steve Kerr and Reggie Miller; Kevin Harlan, Reggie Miller, Kenny Smith, Charles Barkley and Shaquille O'Neal (All-Star Saturday Night); Matt Winer, Mike Fratello and Chris Webber (Rising Stars Challenge)

NBA All-Star Game
| < 2012 | 2014 > |

The 2013 NBA All-Star Game was an exhibition basketball game that was played on February 17, 2013, during the National Basketball Association's (NBA) 2012–13 season. It was the 62nd edition of the NBA All-Star Game, and was played at Toyota Center in Houston, home of the Houston Rockets. The Western Conference defeated the Eastern Conference, 143–138. Chris Paul of the Los Angeles Clippers was named the All-Star Game Most Valuable Player. The Rockets were awarded the All-Star Game in an announcement by commissioner David Stern on February 8, 2012. This was the third time that Houston had hosted the All-Star Game; the city had previously hosted the event in 1989 at the Astrodome and 2006 at the Toyota Center. It was also the fourth All-Star Game to be hosted by the Rockets franchise, with the first in 1971, when they were known as the San Diego Rockets.

Starters for the game were selected by the fans, who could select three frontcourt players and two guards from each conference. Previously, fans selected two forwards and one center instead of generic frontcourt players. Kobe Bryant of the Los Angeles Lakers received the most overall votes at 1,591,437.

Starting this season, NBA All-Star Saturday Night events became contests between the Eastern and Western Conferences.

== All-Star Game ==
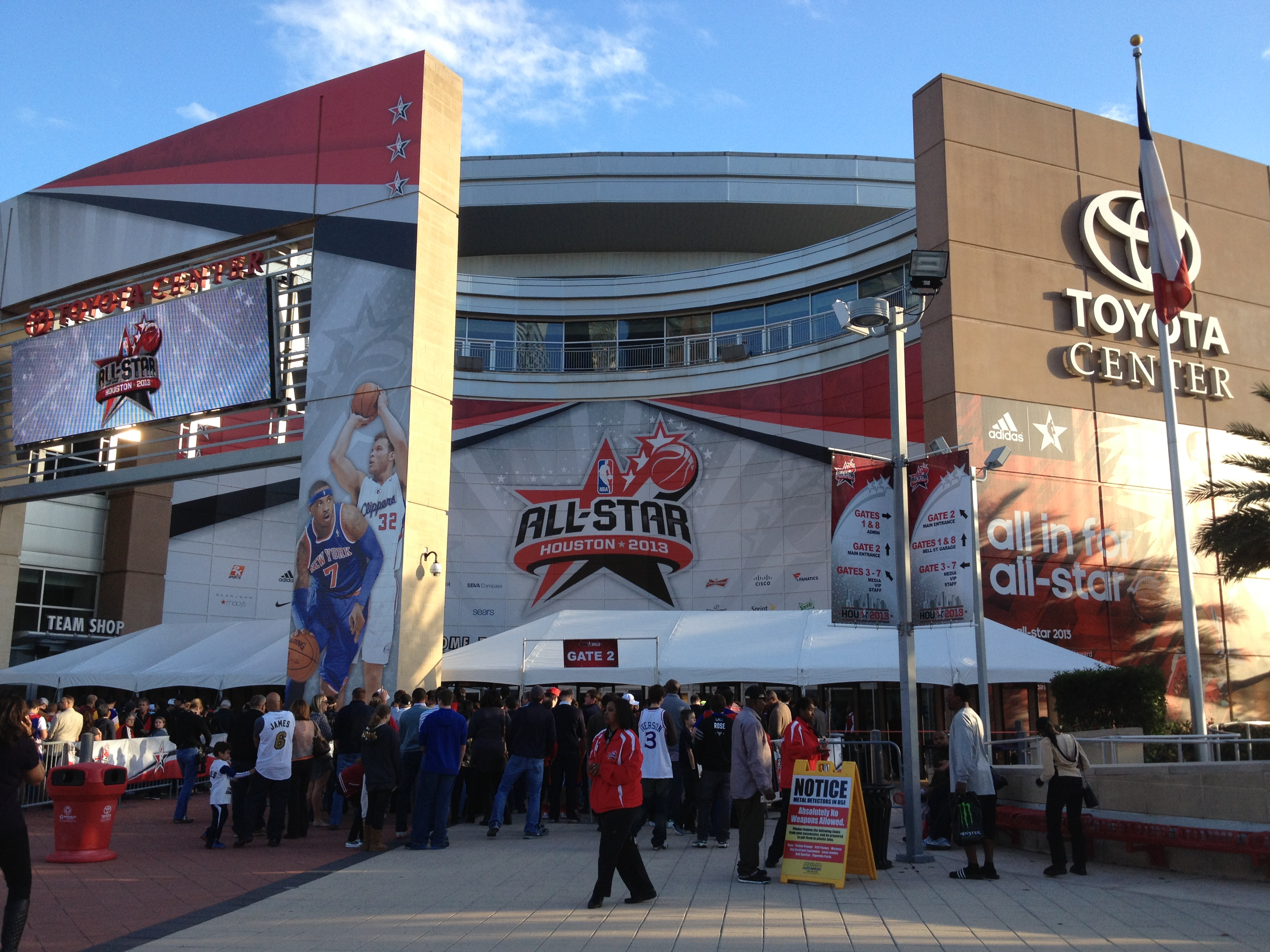
Spectators make their way into Toyota Center through the LaBranch street entrance prior to tip-off of the 62nd NBA All-Star game on Sunday, Feb. 17, 2013.

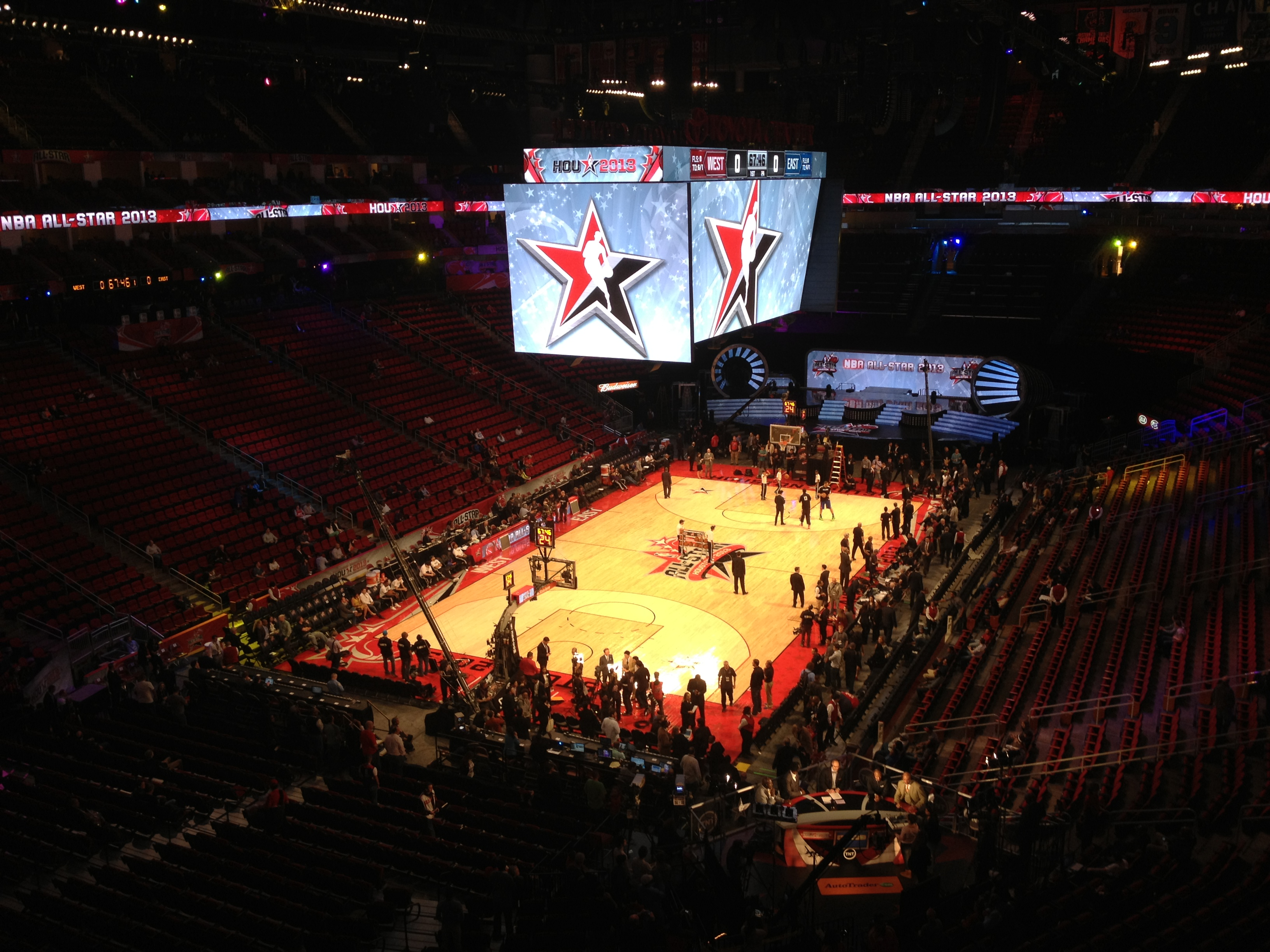
The inside of the Toyota Center hours prior to tip-off of the 62nd NBA All-Star game on Sunday, Feb. 17, 2013. The arena crew make the last preparations as spectators start to fill the arena.

=== Coaches ===
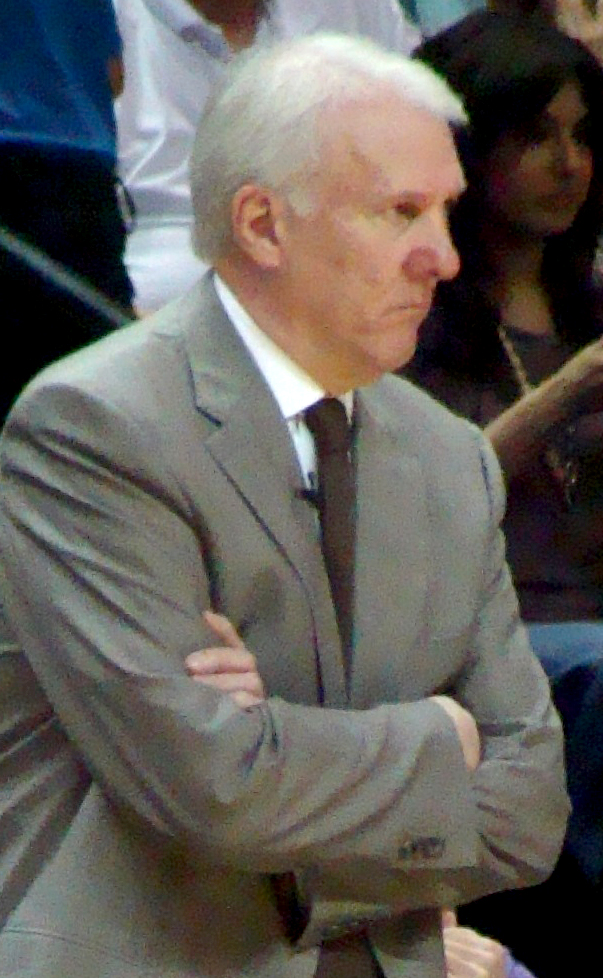
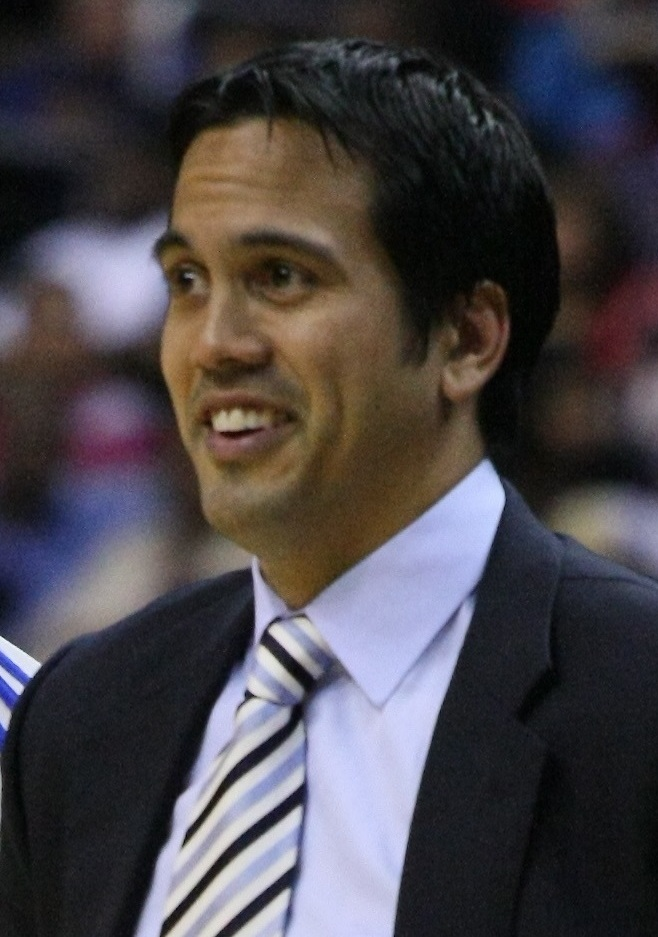
Gregg Popovich (left) and Erik Spoelstra (right) were selected as the West and East head coach, respectively.

The coaches for the All-Star game were the head coaches who led the teams with the best winning percentages in their conference through the games of February 3, 2013. Gregg Popovich of the San Antonio Spurs clinched the West position after a win on January 30. Erik Spoelstra of the Miami Heat clinched the East position after a win over the Toronto Raptors on February 3, 2013. The head coaches from the previous year, Tom Thibodeau and Scott Brooks, were not eligible for selection.

=== Players ===
The rosters for the All-Star Game were chosen in two ways. The starters were chosen via a fan ballot. Two guards and three frontcourt players who received the highest vote were named the All-Star starters. NBA head coaches voted for the reserves for their respective conferences, none of which could be players on their own team. Each coach selected two guards, three frontcourt players and two wild cards, with each selected player ranked in order of preference within each category. If a multi-position player was to be selected, coaches were encouraged to vote for the player at the position that was "most advantageous for the All-Star team," regardless of where the player was listed on the All-Star ballot or the position he was listed in box scores. If a player is unable to participate due to injury, the commissioner will select a replacement.

Kobe Bryant of the Los Angeles Lakers topped the ballots with 1,591,437 votes, which earned him a starting position as a guard in the Western Conference team. Bryant earned a record 15th consecutive All-Star selection. Chris Paul, Kevin Durant, Blake Griffin, and Dwight Howard completed the Western Conference starting position. The lone first-time All-Star in the Western Conference is the Houston Rockets' James Harden. All of the players from the West started in last year's All-Star Game, save for Howard who started for the East, and similar to last year, both Los Angeles teams, the Lakers and the Clippers, are represented by two players each, all of whom are starters. Also sending a pair of players to the All-Star Game were the Oklahoma City Thunder, represented by Durant and Russell Westbrook, and the San Antonio Spurs, represented by Tim Duncan and Tony Parker. The Golden State Warriors had an All-Star representative for the first time since Latrell Sprewell was selected in 1997, with David Lee.

The Eastern Conference's leading vote-getter was LeBron James, who finished with 1,583,646 votes. Rajon Rondo, Dwyane Wade, Carmelo Anthony, and Kevin Garnett completed the Eastern Conference starting positions. Anthony, James and Wade were starters for the previous year's Eastern Conference team. The Eastern Conference reserves included six first-time selections: Tyson Chandler, Paul George, Jrue Holiday, Kyrie Irving, Brook Lopez, and Joakim Noah. The Boston Celtics sent two players to start in the All-Star Game for the first time since 1984, when Larry Bird and Robert Parish started for the East. The New York Knicks sent two players to the All-Star Game for the first time since 2001.

=== Roster ===
Eastern Conference All-Stars
| Pos | Player | Team | No. of selections | Votes |
Starters
| G | Rajon Rondo^{INJ} ^{1} | Boston Celtics | 4 | 924,180 |
| G | Dwyane Wade (C) | Miami Heat | 9 | 1,052,310 |
| F | LeBron James | Miami Heat | 9 | 1,583,646 |
| F | Carmelo Anthony | New York Knicks | 6 | 1,460,950 |
| F/C | Kevin Garnett | Boston Celtics | 15 | 553,222 |
Reserves
| F/C | Chris Bosh^{1} | Miami Heat | 8 | — |
| C | Tyson Chandler | New York Knicks | 1 | — |
| F | Luol Deng | Chicago Bulls | 2 | — |
| F | Paul George | Indiana Pacers | 1 | — |
| G | Jrue Holiday | Philadelphia 76ers | 1 | — |
| G | Kyrie Irving | Cleveland Cavaliers | 1 | — |
| C | Joakim Noah | Chicago Bulls | 1 | — |
| C | Brook Lopez^{REP} | Brooklyn Nets | 1 | — |
Head coach: Erik Spoelstra (Miami Heat)

Western Conference All-Stars
| Pos | Player | Team | No. of selections | Votes |
Starters
| G | Chris Paul (C) | Los Angeles Clippers | 6 | 929,155 |
| G | Kobe Bryant | Los Angeles Lakers | 15 | 1,591,437 |
| F | Kevin Durant | Oklahoma City Thunder | 4 | 1,504,047 |
| F | Blake Griffin | Los Angeles Clippers | 3 | 863,832 |
| C | Dwight Howard | Los Angeles Lakers | 7 | 922,070 |
Reserves
| F | LaMarcus Aldridge | Portland Trail Blazers | 2 | — |
| F | Tim Duncan | San Antonio Spurs | 14 | — |
| G | James Harden | Houston Rockets | 1 | — |
| F | David Lee | Golden State Warriors | 2 | — |
| G | Tony Parker | San Antonio Spurs | 5 | — |
| F | Zach Randolph | Memphis Grizzlies | 2 | — |
| G | Russell Westbrook | Oklahoma City Thunder | 3 | — |
Head coach: Gregg Popovich (San Antonio Spurs)

(C) – Named team captains for All-Star Game by National Basketball Players Association.

^INJ Did not participate due to injury.
^REP Brook Lopez was named Rajon Rondo's replacement by NBA commissioner David Stern.
^1 Erik Spoelstra chose Chris Bosh to start in place of the injured Rajon Rondo

=== Game ===
TNT

February 17, 2013
8:30 p.m. ET

Box score

Eastern Conference 138, Western Conference 143
Scoring by quarter: 26–31, 39–38, 39–39, 34–35
| Pts: Anthony 26; Rebs: Anthony 12; Asts: Wade 7 | Pts: Durant 30; Rebs: Howard 7 Asts: Paul 15 |

Toyota Center, Houston, Texas
Attendance: 16,101
Referees:
- #10 Ron Garretson
- #71 Rodney Mott
- #40 Leon Wood

The West led at the end of each quarter and won 143–138 behind Chris Paul, who won MVP honors scoring 20 points, handing out 15 assists and grabbing 4 steals. The West never led by more than eight points through the first three quarters, but they pushed the lead to double figures early in the fourth. Kobe Bryant blocked two shots by LeBron James late in the game, part of a late run to secure the game for the West. Kevin Durant led all scorers with 30 points and became the first player in NBA history to score 30+ points in three consecutive All-Star games, while Bryant had nine points and eight assists. Carmelo Anthony led the East with 26 points and 12 rebounds. James, who shot well during the latter part of the season's first half, shot only 7-for-18 while scoring 19 points.

== All-Star Weekend ==
=== BBVA Rising Stars Challenge ===
Team Shaq
| Round | Pick | Pos. | Player | Team | Rookie / Sophomore |
|---|---|---|---|---|---|
| 1 | 1 | G | Damian Lillard | Portland Trail Blazers | Rookie |
| 2 | 3 | G | Kyrie Irving | Cleveland Cavaliers | Sophomore |
| 3 | 5 | C | Andre Drummond^{INJ} | Detroit Pistons | Rookie |
| 4 | 7 | G/F | Klay Thompson | Golden State Warriors | Sophomore |
| 5 | 9 | F | Harrison Barnes | Golden State Warriors | Rookie |
| 6 | 11 | F | Chandler Parsons | Houston Rockets | Sophomore |
| 7 | 13 | G | Dion Waiters | Cleveland Cavaliers | Rookie |
| 8 | 15 | F | Michael Kidd-Gilchrist | Charlotte Bobcats | Rookie |
| Draw | | C | Tyler Zeller | Cleveland Cavaliers | Rookie |
| Draw | | G | Kemba Walker | Charlotte Bobcats | Sophomore |
| – | | F | Andrew Nicholson^{REP} | Orlando Magic | Rookie |
Head coach: David Fizdale (Miami Heat)
General manager: Shaquille O'Neal

Team Chuck
| Round | Pick | Pos. | Player | Team | Rookie / Sophomore |
|---|---|---|---|---|---|
| 1 | 2 | F/C | Anthony Davis | New Orleans Hornets | Rookie |
| 2 | 4 | F | Kenneth Faried | Denver Nuggets | Sophomore |
| 3 | 6 | F | Kawhi Leonard | San Antonio Spurs | Sophomore |
| 4 | 8 | G | Bradley Beal | Washington Wizards | Rookie |
| 5 | 10 | G | Ricky Rubio | Minnesota Timberwolves | Sophomore |
| 6 | 12 | F/C | Tristan Thompson | Cleveland Cavaliers | Sophomore |
| 7 | 14 | C | Nikola Vučević | Orlando Magic | Sophomore |
| 8 | 16 | G | Brandon Knight | Detroit Pistons | Sophomore |
| Draw | | G | Isaiah Thomas | Sacramento Kings | Sophomore |
| Draw | | G | Alexey Shved | Minnesota Timberwolves | Rookie |
Head coach: Mike Budenholzer (San Antonio Spurs)
General manager: Charles Barkley

^INJ Andre Drummond was unable to participate due to injury.
^REP Andrew Nicholson was named Andre Drummond's replacement.

TNT

February 15
9:00 p.m. ET

Boxscore

Team Shaq 135, Team Chuck 163
Scoring by half: 66–90, 69–73
| Pts: Irving 32; Rebs: Irving 6 Asts: Walker 8 | Pts: Faried 40; Rebs: Faried, Thompson 10; Asts: Rubio, Thomas 10 |

Toyota Center, Houston, Texas
Attendance: 16,101
Referees:
- #66 Haywoode Workman
- #58 Josh Tiven
- #60 James Williams

=== Sears Shooting Stars Competition ===
- Note:
  - The sponsor of 2013 Shooting Stars Competition changed from Haier to Sears.
  - 2013 Shooting Stars Competition consisted four teams of three players, East and West represent two (teams) of each.

Western Contestants
| Team Name | Members | Team | First round | Final round |
|---|---|---|---|---|
| Team Harden | James Harden | Houston Rockets | 37.9 | - |
| Team Harden | Tina Thompson | Seattle Storm | 37.9 | - |
| Team Harden | Sam Cassell | (retired) | 37.9 | - |
| Team Westbrook | Russell Westbrook | Oklahoma City Thunder | 29.5 | DNF |
| Team Westbrook | Maya Moore | Minnesota Lynx | 29.5 | DNF |
| Team Westbrook | Robert Horry | (retired) | 29.5 | DNF |

Eastern Contestants
| Team Name | Members | Team | First round | Final round |
|---|---|---|---|---|
| Team Bosh | Chris Bosh | Miami Heat | 50.0 | 1:29 |
| Team Bosh | Swin Cash | Chicago Sky | 50.0 | 1:29 |
| Team Bosh | Dominique Wilkins | (retired) | 50.0 | 1:29 |
| Team Lopez | Brook Lopez | Brooklyn Nets | 1:07 | - |
| Team Lopez | Tamika Catchings | Indiana Fever | 1:07 | - |
| Team Lopez | Muggsy Bogues | (retired) | 1:07 | - |

- All Legends do not specify which teams players represent.

=== Taco Bell Skill Challenge ===
- Note: 2013 Skill Challenge had six players as usual, but divided three players of each conference into East and West.

Eastern Contestants
| Pos. | Player | Team | Height | Weight | First round | Final round |
|---|---|---|---|---|---|---|
| G | Jrue Holiday | Philadelphia 76ers | 6–4 | 205 | 29.3 | 35.6 |
| G | Brandon Knight | Detroit Pistons | 6–3 | 189 | 32.2 | NA |
| G | Jeff Teague | Atlanta Hawks | 6–2 | 181 | 49.4 | NA |

Western Contestants
| Pos. | Player | Team | Height | Weight | First round | Final round |
|---|---|---|---|---|---|---|
| G | Damian Lillard | Portland Trail Blazers | 6–3 | 195 | 28.8 | 29.8 |
| G | Jeremy Lin | Houston Rockets | 6–3 | 200 | 35.8 | NA |
| G | Tony Parker | San Antonio Spurs | 6–2 | 180 | 48.7 | NA |

=== Foot Locker Three-Pointer Contest ===
- Note: 2013 Three-Point Contest had six players as usual, but divided three players of each conference into East and West.

Eastern Contestants
| Pos. | Player | Team | Height | Weight | First round | Final round |
|---|---|---|---|---|---|---|
| G/F | Paul George | Indiana Pacers | 6–8 | 221 | 10 | NA |
| G | Kyrie Irving | Cleveland Cavaliers | 6–3 | 191 | 18 | 23 |
| F | Steve Novak | New York Knicks | 6–10 | 235 | 17 | NA |

Western Contestants
| Pos. | Player | Team | Height | Weight | First round | Final round |
|---|---|---|---|---|---|---|
| F | Ryan Anderson | New Orleans Hornets | 6–10 | 240 | 18 | NA |
| F/C | Matt Bonner | San Antonio Spurs | 6–10 | 235 | 19 | 20 |
| G | Stephen Curry | Golden State Warriors | 6–3 | 185 | 17 | NA |

=== Sprite Slam Dunk Contest ===
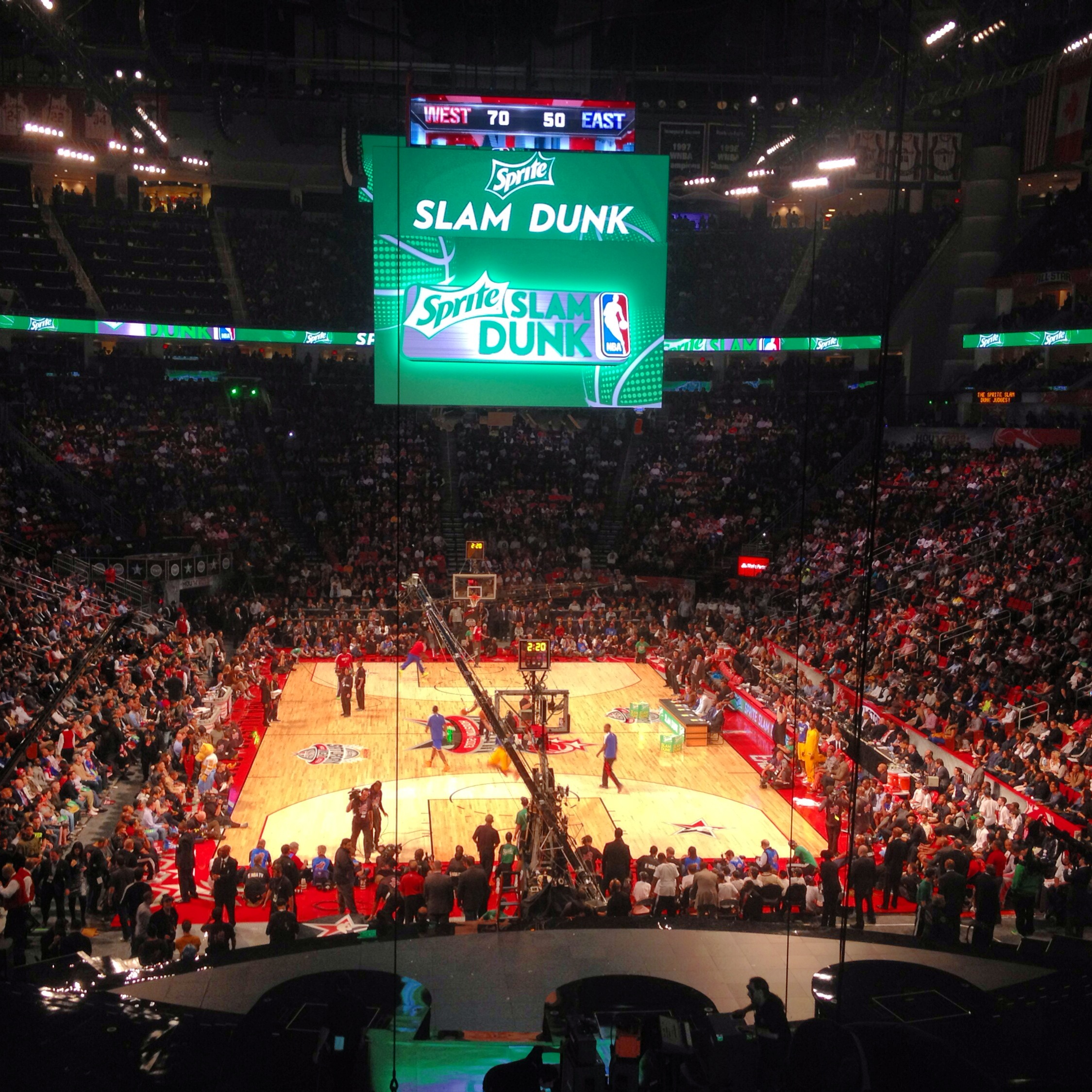
Spectators inside the Toyota Center await the start of the NBA Slam Dunk contest on Saturday, Feb. 16, 2013.

- Note:
  - 2013 Slam Dunk Contest increased from four players to six, with three players representing each conference into East and West.
  - The allowable dunk time was shortened from 2:00 to 1:30, but if the player had not finished a dunk within 1:30, he would be given one final attempt.
  - In Team Round (or First Round), each competitor completed two dunks which were scored on a scale of 6 to 10 by a panel of 5 judges. The Championship Round (or Final Round) was a fan voting poll to decide a winner.

Eastern Contestants
| Pos. | Player | Team | Height | Weight | First round | | | Final round |
| Pos. | Player | Team | Height | Weight | 1st dunk | 2nd dunk | Total | Votes |
|---|---|---|---|---|---|---|---|---|
| G/F | Gerald Green | Indiana Pacers | 6–8 | 210 | 50 | 32 | 82 | N/A |
| G | Terrence Ross | Toronto Raptors | 6–6 | 195 | 50 | 49 | 99 | 58% |
| G/F | James White | New York Knicks | 6–7 | 215 | 45 | 32 | 77 | N/A |

Western Contestants
| Pos. | Player | Team | Height | Weight | First round | | | Final round |
| Pos. | Player | Team | Height | Weight | 1st dunk | 2nd dunk | Total | Votes |
|---|---|---|---|---|---|---|---|---|
| G | Eric Bledsoe | Los Angeles Clippers | 6–1 | 195 | 39 | 50 | 89 | N/A |
| F | Jeremy Evans | Utah Jazz | 6–9 | 194 | 47 | 43 | 90 | 42% |
| F | Kenneth Faried | Denver Nuggets | 6–8 | 228 | 39 | 50 | 89 | N/A |

=== Competition score ===
Starting in 2013, the Western Conference and the Eastern Conference will compete to see who gets the most points. This score will only be applied to All-Star Saturday Night competitions.

- Final Score:
  - Eastern: 125
  - Western: 140
- Structure:
  - Team Round = First Round, Championship Round = Final Round.
  - Each competition will have two rounds.
  - TEAM ROUND—All competitors within each conference will have their scores added together to get a TOTAL time/score.
  - Points will be awarded to the conference that wins the Team Round (best TOTAL time/score)
  - The highest scoring (or fastest timing) competitor from each conference will advance to the Championship Round.
  - CHAMPIONSHIP ROUND—A head-to-head competition between the highest scoring West and highest scoring East competitor from the Team Round, to decide each competition champion.
  - Points will be awarded to the conference whose competitor wins the Championship Round.
  - The conference with the most points at the end of the night will be crowned State Farm All-Star Saturday Night Champions.
- Event Scoring:
- Sears Shooting Stars:
  - TEAM Round—20 POINTS awarded to the conference with the fastest TOTAL time.
  - CHAMPIONSHIP Round—10 POINTS awarded to the conference of the champion.
- Taco Bell Skills Challenge:
  - TEAM Round—30 POINTS awarded to the conference with the fastest TOTAL time.
  - CHAMPIONSHIP Round—10 POINTS awarded to the conference of the champion.
- Foot Locker Three-Point Contest:
  - TEAM Round—40 POINTS awarded to the conference with the highest TOTAL score.
  - CHAMPIONSHIP Round—10 POINTS awarded to the conference of the champion.
- Sprite Slam Dunk:
  - TEAM Round—50 POINTS awarded to the conference with the highest TOTAL score.
  - CHAMPIONSHIP Round—55 POINTS awarded to the conference of the champion.
  - In addition, each time a player scores a perfect 50 for a dunk during the TEAM Round, his conference will have 10 BONUS POINTS added to its overall All-Star Saturday Night score.
