= Jon Spoelstra =

American author, sports marketer, and business executive (born 1946)

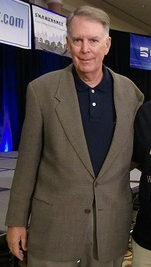
- Spoelstra in January 2012
- Born: June 19, 1946 (age 80)
- Education: University of Notre Dame
- Height: 6 ft 3 in (1.91 m)
- Spouse: Elisa Celino
- Children: 2, including Erik Spoelstra
- Parent: Watson Spoelstra (father)

Jon Spoelstra (born June 19, 1946) is an American author, sports marketer, and a former National Basketball Association (NBA) executive for the Buffalo Braves, Portland Trail Blazers, Denver Nuggets and New Jersey Nets. He is the co-founder of SRO Partners, and he currently serves as president of Mandalay Sports Entertainment. Spoelstra graduated from Notre Dame in 1966. He was a judge at the Miss America 2004 contest. He has two children: Monica and Erik, the head coach of the Miami Heat. Spoelstra's father was sportswriter Watson Spoelstra.

== NBA and business career ==
After graduating from Notre Dame in 1966, Spoelstra founded his first marketing company in 1970, The New School of Youth Marketing and Other Phenomena Inc. In the mid-1970s, his company obtained the rights to syndicate Notre Dame basketball games for $2,000 per game. In 1977, Spoelstra's career in the NBA began when the Buffalo Braves hired him as vice president of marketing. One of his biggest tasks he was assigned was to try to prevent a relocation of the Braves, although the team moved to San Diego ten months later. In 1979, then Portland Trail Blazers owner Larry Weinberg hired Spoelstra as senior vice president and general manager where he would serve for ten years before resigning.

In one of the most unusual transactions in NBA history, Spoelstra was effectively traded in January 1983 while serving as vice president of marketing for the Portland Trail Blazers. After Portland’s starting point guard, Darnell Valentine, suffered an injury, the Indiana Pacers, who were struggling financially and exploring a potential sale to California out in either Anaheim or Sacramento or otherwise would have looked to have the team be bought out by the NBA itself, offered veteran guard Don Buse to the Blazers in exchange for Spoelstra’s temporary services as a marketing consultant. Though initially believed to be a joke, the deal was approved by Blazers owner Larry Weinberg, with the official announcement framing it as "Don Buse for cash and other considerations," with Spoelstra being considered the "other consideration" in mind. He spent a week in Indianapolis (one week less than planned) meeting prospective buyers and providing recommendations, including strategies for in-house radio broadcasting, before returning to Portland with the DEC desktop computer the Pacers had promised him. The trade ultimately aided both franchises: Buse helped Portland reach the 1983 NBA playoffs, while the Pacers were sold later that year to Mel and Herb Simon, whom Spoelstra had met during his visit, who kept the team in Indiana and continue implementing the same strategies to this very day.

The Denver Nuggets hired Spoelstra in 1989 as president and general manager, but he was fired after 90 days due to a dispute with management. Spoelstra returned to Portland, where he co-founded SRO Partners, and began teaching sports marketing at the University of Portland. He began consulting for the New Jersey Nets in March 1991, and became the team's president 1993. During his time with the Nets, Spoelstra implemented marketing tactics that increased the team's home game attendance from last in the league when he initially arrived to first in the NBA. His most famous marketing gimmick came in 1994, when he sent rubber chickens through direct mail with the tagline "Don't Fowl Out!" to Nets season ticket holders who had not yet renewed their season tickets.

== Bibliography ==
- Spoelstra, Jon (1997). Ice to the Eskimos: How to Market a Product Nobody Wants. New York: HarperCollins. ISBN 0061745839.
- Spoelstra, Jon (1999). Success is Just One Wish Away. DelStar Books. ISBN 1891686151.
- Spoelstra, Jon (2001). Marketing Outrageously Redux: How to Increase Your Revenue by Staggering Amounts. Bard Press. ISBN 1885167504.
