= Watson Spoelstra =

American sportswriter (1910–1999)

- Born: April 5, 1910; Grand Rapids, Michigan, U.S.
- Died: July 20, 1999 (aged 89); Largo, Florida, U.S.
- Education: Hope College
- Occupation: Sportswriter
- Employer: The Detroit News (1945–1973)
- Known for: Waddy's World (1947–1973); Founder and leader, Baseball Chapel (1973–1982)
- Children: Jon Spoelstra
- Relatives: Erik Spoelstra (grandson)

Watson N. "Waddy" Spoelstra (April 5, 1910 – July 20, 1999) was an American sportswriter for The Detroit News from 1945 to 1973. He served as the president of the Baseball Writers' Association of America in 1968. After retiring from The Detroit News, he founded Baseball Chapel, a Christian ministry for professional baseball players, which he led from 1973 to 1982.

Spoelstra was born in Grand Rapids, Michigan in 1910. He attended Hope College where he played baseball and basketball. He became Hope College's all-time leading scorer in basketball. He graduated from Hope College in 1932.

After graduating from college, Spoelstra was hired as a sportswriter by the Associated Press, assigned to Detroit. In approximately 1945, Spoelstra was hired by The Detroit News, where he remained for nearly 30 years.

His son Jon Spoelstra is a former National Basketball Association executive and his grandson Erik Spoelstra is the current head coach of the Miami Heat.
