= Erik Spoelstra =

American basketball coach (born 1970)

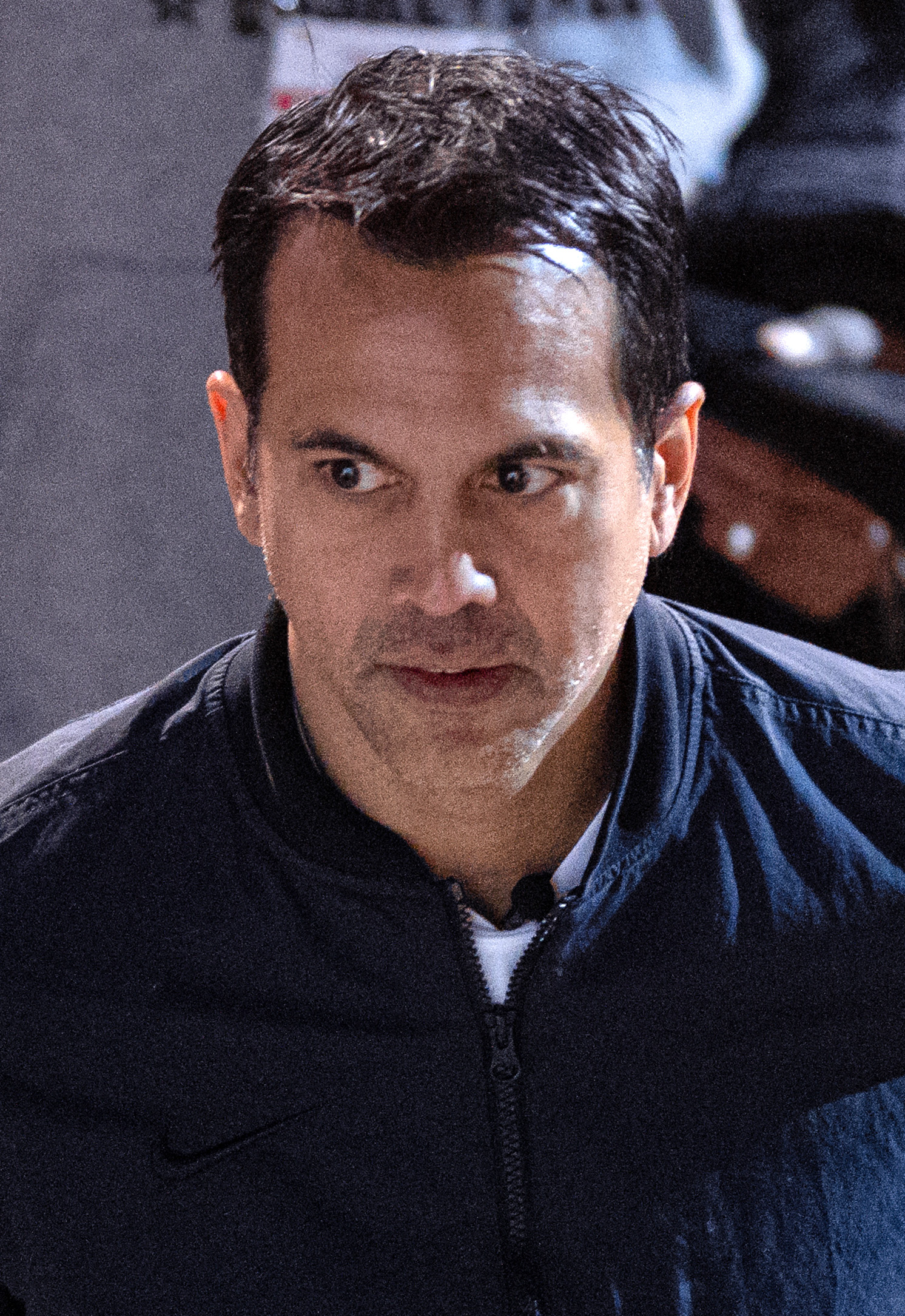
- Spoelstra at the 2022 NBA All-Star Game

Miami Heat
- Title: Head coach
- League: NBA

Personal information
- Born: November 1, 1970 (age 56) Evanston, Illinois, U.S.
- Listed height: 6 ft 2 in (1.88 m)
- Listed weight: 180 lb (82 kg)

Career information
- High school: Jesuit (Beaverton, Oregon)
- College: Portland (1988–1992)
- NBA draft: 1992: undrafted
- Playing career: 1993–1995
- Position: Point guard
- Coaching career: 1993–present

Career history

Playing
- 1993–1995: TuS Herten

Coaching
- 1993–1995: TuS Herten (assistant)
- 1997–2008: Miami Heat (assistant)
- 2008–present: Miami Heat

Career highlights
- As player: WCC Freshman of the Year (1989); As head coach: 2× NBA champion (2012, 2013); 2× NBA All-Star Game head coach (2013, 2022); NBCA Co-Coach of the Year (2017); Top 15 Coaches in NBA History; As assistant coach: NBA champion (2006)
Medals
Assistant coach for United States
Men's national basketball team
Olympic Games
Gold medal – first place	2024 Paris	Team

Erik Jon Spoelstra (/ˈspoʊlstrə/ SPOHL-strə; born November 1, 1970), is a Filipino-American professional basketball coach who is the head coach for the Miami Heat of the National Basketball Association (NBA) and the U.S. national team. Nicknamed Spo, he is widely regarded as one of the greatest coaches of all time. He has won three NBA championships with the Heat, including two as the team's head coach. Following the retirement of Gregg Popovich as head coach of the San Antonio Spurs in 2025, and the resignation of head coach Mike Tomlin of the NFL's Pittsburgh Steelers, Spoelstra is currently the longest-tenured active NBA head coach with a single team, and the longest-tenured active head coach in the four major North American sports leagues.

Spoelstra played college basketball with the Portland Pilots before playing professionally and coaching in Germany. He served as assistant coach and director of scouting for the Heat from 2001 to 2008, during which time the team won the 2006 NBA Finals. Spoelstra was promoted to head coach in the 2008–09 season. The Heat have made six NBA Finals appearances during his tenure, winning consecutive championships in 2012 and 2013, becoming the first Asian American head coach in the four major North American sports leagues to win a championship.

== Early life and education ==
Spoelstra was born in Evanston which is directly north of Chicago, to Jon Spoelstra and Elisa Celino. Jon, an American of Dutch and Irish descent, is a former NBA executive of the Buffalo Braves, Portland Trail Blazers, Denver Nuggets, and New Jersey Nets. Elisa is a native of San Pablo, Laguna, Philippines. Erik is also the grandson of Watson Spoelstra, a longtime sportswriter for The Detroit News.

As a child, Erik Spoelstra lived in Buffalo, New York and moved to Portland, Oregon by the late 1970s. He went to Raleigh Hills Elementary and Whitford Jr. High School in Portland before attending Jesuit High School in Beaverton, Oregon, where he excelled at point guard on the basketball team. Spoelstra wore number 30 during high school and college in honor of then-Trail Blazer Terry Porter, one of his favorite NBA players. Prior to his senior year, Spoelstra participated in Sonny Vaccaro's Nike All-Star camp in Princeton, New Jersey, alongside future NBA players Alonzo Mourning, Shawn Kemp, Billy Owens, and Bobby Hurley.

== College career ==
Spoelstra received basketball scholarship offers, and eventually accepted one from the University of Portland in Portland. In 1989, he was named West Coast Conference (WCC) freshman of the year. He was the Pilots' starting point guard for four years, averaging 9.2 points, 4.4 assists, and 2.4 rebounds per game. He is a member of the school's 1,000-point club, and is among the Pilots' career leaders in several statistical categories. During a 1990 WCC basketball tournament game against Loyola Marymount, he was on the court standing near Hank Gathers when Gathers collapsed and died of a heart condition. Spoelstra majored in communications and graduated from the University of Portland in 1992.

== Professional career ==
=== TuS Herten (1993–1995) ===
After college, Spoelstra initially boxed shoes at a Nike warehouse. He had originally planned to play basketball in the Philippines as he had watched their games on VHS tape for years. However, the paperwork to play in the country got delayed. Instead he went to Germany, spending two years (1993–1995) in the 2. Basketball Bundesliga as a player–assistant coach for TuS Herten, a professional club based in Westphalia and here he got his first coaching job, as coach of the club's local youth team. Spoelstra began having back problems after the end of his second year with the team, and contemplated having surgery. In 1995, Spoelstra was offered another two-year contract with the club, but the NBA's Miami Heat also offered him a position. Although both offers held appeal, Spoelstra chose to take the Heat position.

== Coaching career ==
=== Miami Heat (1995–present) ===
==== Assistant coach (1997–2008) ====
Chris Wallace, then the director of player personnel for the Heat, convinced then general manager Dave Wohl to offer Spoelstra a position with the team. Spoelstra was hired as the Heat's video coordinator in 1995, although at first he was not promised the position past the summer of that year. Pat Riley was named the Heat's head coach not long after Spoelstra's hiring. Erik's father, Jon Spoelstra, said, "Contractually, Riley wasn't allowed to bring in his video guy, otherwise, Erik would have been out of a job right then."

After two years as video coordinator, Spoelstra was an assistant coach/video coordinator for two years. He was promoted to assistant coach/advance scout in 1999, and later became the Heat's assistant coach/director of scouting in 2001. Many of his colleagues attribute his ascent in the Heat coaching ranks to his strong work ethic. As an assistant coach, he was credited for improving Heat star shooting guard Dwyane Wade's balance and jump shot after Wade's return from the 2004 Summer Olympics. Spoelstra won his first NBA championship as an assistant coach when the Heat defeated the Dallas Mavericks in the 2006 NBA Finals.

==== Head coach promotion and struggles (2008–2011) ====
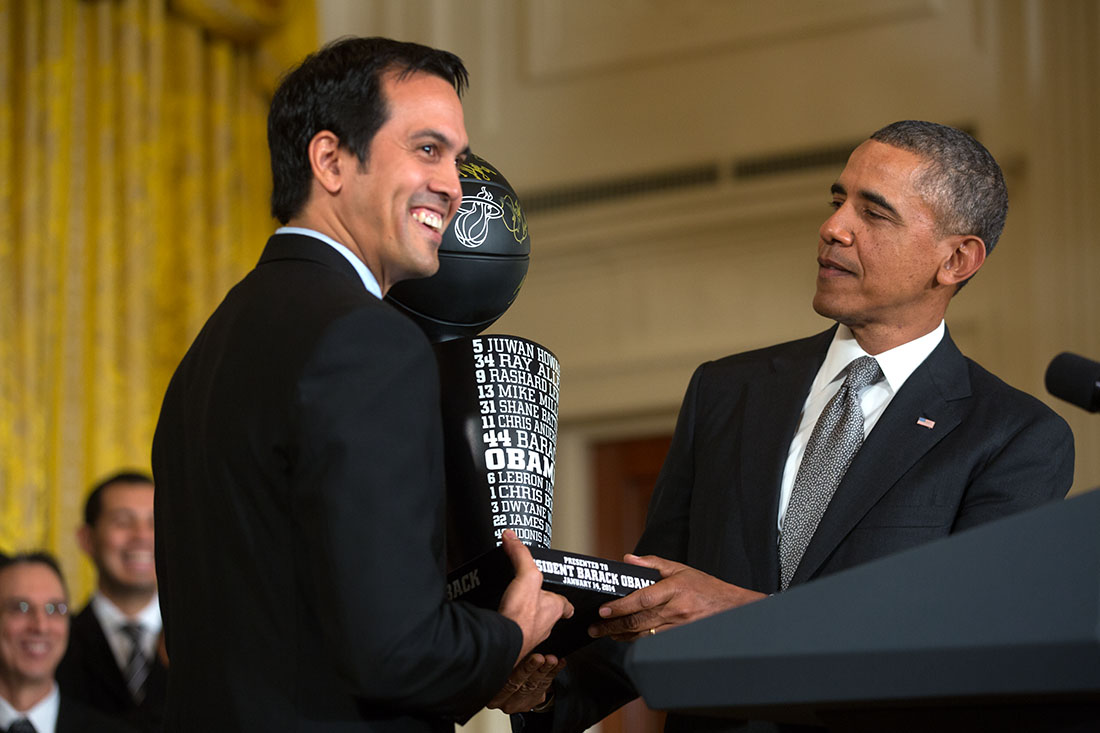
Spoelstra presents a team trophy to President Barack Obama in January 2014.

In April 2008, Spoelstra became the head coach of the Miami Heat after Pat Riley's decision to step down. Spoelstra was Riley's hand-picked successor. In naming Spoelstra as head coach, Riley said: "This game is now about younger coaches who are technologically skilled, innovative, and bring fresh new ideas. That's what we feel we are getting with Erik Spoelstra. He's a man that was born to coach." Spoelstra became the first Asian American head coach in the NBA, and the first Asian American head coach in the history of the four major North American sports leagues. He led the Heat to the NBA Playoffs in his first year as head coach, despite the team's league-worst record of 15-67 the previous season. The Heat, however, were defeated in seven games by the Atlanta Hawks in the first round. Spoelstra's team returned to the postseason a year later, but lost again in the first round to the Boston Celtics in five games.

Expectations of the team's success were raised significantly for the next season and beyond, after the free agent acquisitions of LeBron James and Chris Bosh in the summer of 2010. After the team started off the 2010–11 season with a 9–8 record, some Heat players reportedly were "frustrated" with Spoelstra, and questioned if he should remain their head coach. Chris Bosh intimated that the team was being worked too hard and that the players would rather "chill". LeBron James famously bumped into Spoelstra on his way to the bench during a timeout in a game. These two issues, coupled with the relatively poor start to the season, put Spoelstra on the coaching hot seat. The team bounced back, however, and made the playoffs while posting the second-best record in the Eastern Conference. Spoelstra led the Heat to an appearance in the 2011 NBA Finals, but lost to the Dallas Mavericks in six games. After Spoelstra failed to win a championship during his first season as head coach of the "big three" (James, Wade, and Bosh), Heat executive Pat Riley was asked if he would consider returning to coach the team. Riley, however, turned down the idea and supported Spoelstra as the head coach going forward. Spoelstra received a $6 million contract extension in December 2011 which lasted through the 2013–14 NBA season.

==== Back-to-back championship run (2011–2013) ====
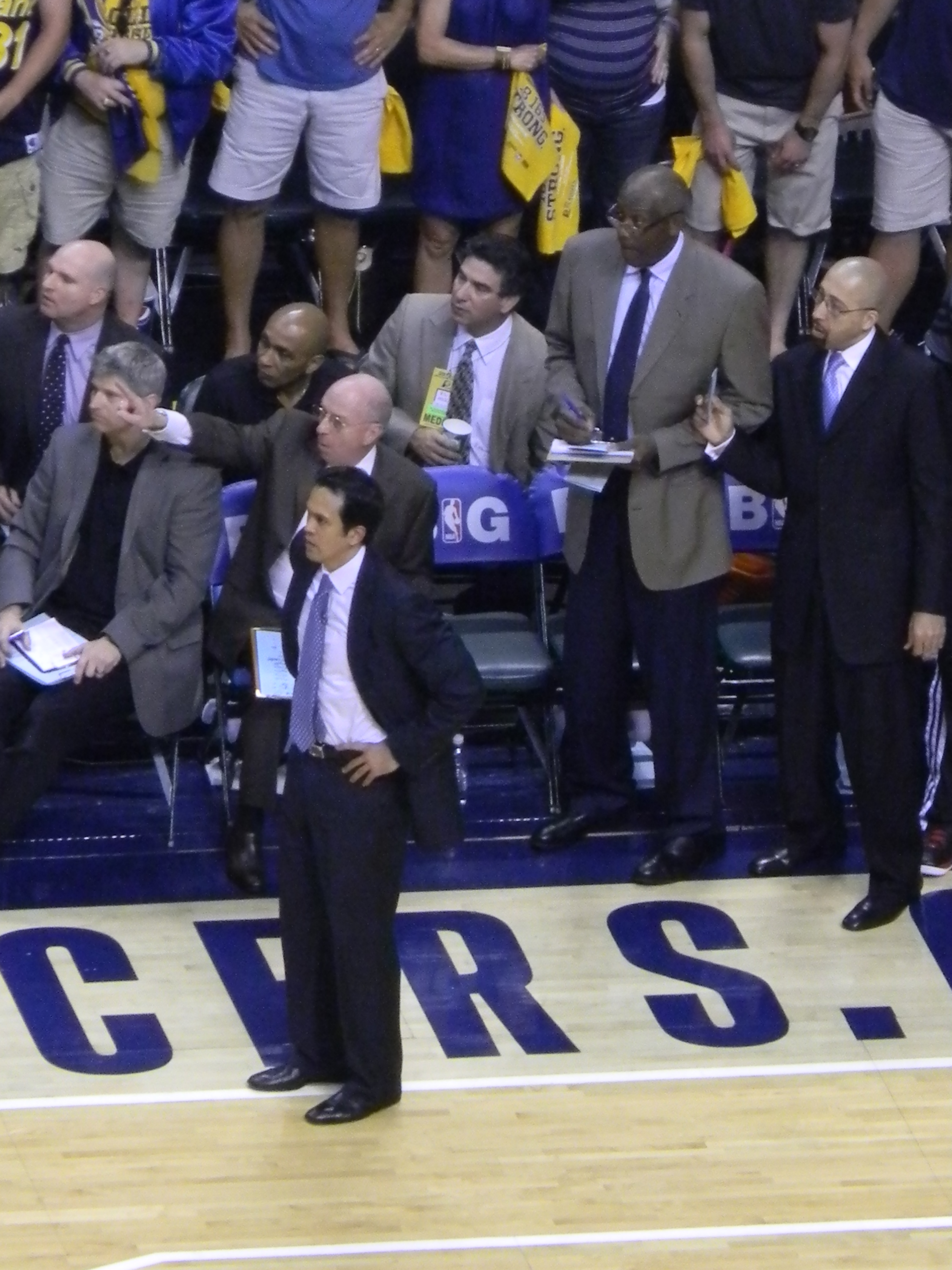
Spoelstra (in front) at an away game between the Heat and Pacers during the playoffs, May 2012

The next season, Spoelstra again guided the team to the postseason as the two seed. The Heat overcame a 2–1 game deficit against the Indiana Pacers in the Eastern Conference semi-finals, and a 3–2 game deficit against the Boston Celtics in the Eastern Conference finals to reach the 2012 NBA Finals despite an injury to starter Chris Bosh that forced him to miss nine straight games. Spoelstra's Heat defeated the Oklahoma City Thunder in five games to win the NBA championship. He became the first Asian American head coach to win an NBA championship, and the second Heat head coach to win the title. He also became the only Miami Heat head coach to take the team to the NBA Finals multiple times.

During the 2012–13 season, Spoelstra was selected as head coach of the 2013 Eastern Conference All-Stars in the 2013 NBA All-Star Game, with the Heat holding the best record in the Eastern Conference at the time of selection. He later coached the Heat to a 27-game winning streak (the third longest in NBA history). It started with a 100–85 win over the Toronto Raptors on February 3, 2013, and ended with a 97–101 loss to the Chicago Bulls on March 27, 2013. The team made the playoffs as the one seed while posting the best overall NBA regular season record. After sweeping the Milwaukee Bucks in the first round, the Heat won a seven-game series with the Indiana Pacers in the Eastern Conference finals, and advanced to face the San Antonio Spurs in the 2013 NBA Finals. The Heat defeated the Spurs in seven games.

==== Later years (2013–present) ====
On September 29, 2013, the Heat extended Spoelstra's contract to an undisclosed multi-year deal. Details were not released, but Spoelstra was expected to receive a pay raise and a bigger role in the front office. Spoelstra led the Heat to the 2014 NBA Finals, becoming the third coach to lead his team to four straight Finals. The Heat faced the San Antonio Spurs once again, only this time losing the series in five games. On December 16, 2017, Spoelstra got his 455th win as the head coach of the Heat and passed Riley for most wins in franchise history, when they defeated the Los Angeles Clippers 90–85. Topping off the 2016–17 season, Spoelstra was named the NBCA Co-Coach of the Year after leading the Heat to a 30 win record in the final 41 games of the season.

During the 2019–20 season, Spoelstra coached the Heat to the 2020 NBA Finals before falling 4–2 to the Los Angeles Lakers. On April 28, 2021, Spoelstra earned his 600th win as the Heat's head coach and also became the sixth head coach in NBA history to win 600 games with one team. On February 6, 2022, Spoelstra was named as the Eastern Conference head coach for the 2022 NBA All-Star Game.

On March 13, 2023, Spoelstra won his 697th game, which ranks him 20th on the all-time wins list among NBA head coaches. He surpassed Red Holzman and is behind John MacLeod on the list. During the 2022–23 season, Spoelstra coached the 8-seed Heat to the 2023 NBA Finals, his sixth appearance as head coach, but lost the series to the Denver Nuggets in five games.

On January 9, 2024, Spoelstra and the Heat agreed to an eight-year contract extension worth more than 120 million.

When the NFL's Pittsburgh Steelers head coach Mike Tomlin stepped down on January 13, 2026 and the Baltimore Ravens head coach John Harbaugh was fired on January 6 2026, Spoelstra became the longest-tenured active coach in U.S. pro sports.

== Personal life ==
After a brief engagement with Analia Romero, Spoelstra announced his engagement to former Miami Heat dancer, Nikki Sapp. They were married in July 2016 and have three children. In November 2023, the couple divorced.

On November 6, 2025, his home in Coral Gables, Florida was heavily damaged by fire. Spoelstra was not at home when the fire started, having been with the team on a chartered flight back to Miami. His children were at their mother's house at the time.

== Head coaching record ==
Legend
Regular season	G	Games coached	W	Games won	L	Games lost	W–L %	Win–loss %
Playoffs	PG	Playoff games	PW	Playoff wins	PL	Playoff losses	PW–L %	Playoff win–loss %

Team	Year	G	W	L	W–L%	Finish	PG	PW	PL	PW–L%	Result
Miami	2008–09	82	43	39	.524	3rd in Southeast	7	3	4	.429	Lost in first round
Miami	2009–10	82	47	35	.573	3rd in Southeast	5	1	4	.200	Lost in first round
Miami	2010–11	82	58	24	.707	1st in Southeast	21	14	7	.667	Lost in NBA Finals
Miami	2011–12	66	46	20	.697	1st in Southeast	23	16	7	.696	Won NBA championship
Miami	2012–13	82	66	16	.805	1st in Southeast	23	16	7	.696	Won NBA championship
Miami	2013–14	82	54	28	.659	1st in Southeast	20	13	7	.650	Lost in NBA Finals
Miami	2014–15	82	37	45	.451	3rd in Southeast	—	—	—	—	Missed playoffs
Miami	2015–16	82	48	34	.585	1st in Southeast	14	7	7	.500	Lost in conference semifinals
Miami	2016–17	82	41	41	.500	3rd in Southeast	—	—	—	—	Missed playoffs
Miami	2017–18	82	44	38	.537	1st in Southeast	5	1	4	.200	Lost in first round
Miami	2018–19	82	39	43	.476	3rd in Southeast	—	—	—	—	Missed playoffs
Miami	2019–20	73	44	29	.603	1st in Southeast	21	14	7	.667	Lost in NBA Finals
Miami	2020–21	72	40	32	.556	2nd in Southeast	4	0	4	.000	Lost in first round
Miami	2021–22	82	53	29	.646	1st in Southeast	18	11	7	.611	Lost in conference finals
Miami	2022–23	82	44	38	.537	1st in Southeast	23	13	10	.565	Lost in NBA Finals
Miami	2023–24	82	46	36	.561	2nd in Southeast	5	1	4	.200	Lost in first round
Miami	2024–25	82	37	45	.451	3rd in Southeast	4	0	4	.000	Lost in first round
Miami	2025–26	82	43	39	.524	4th in Southeast	—	—	—	—	Missed playoffs
Career		1,441	830	611	.576		189	110	83	.570	
