= List of NBA All-Stars =

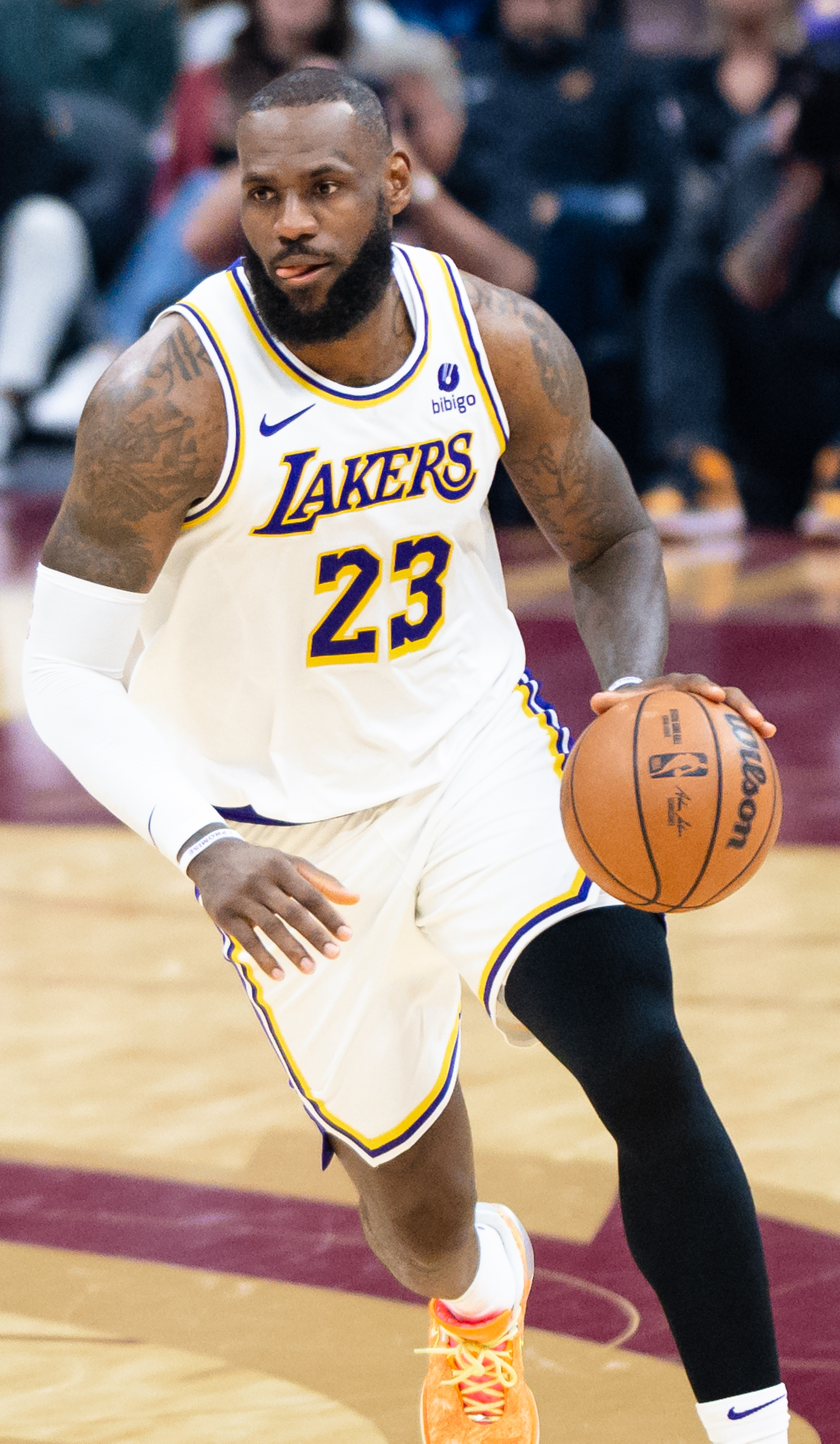
LeBron James was selected to start in the NBA All-Star Game 22 consecutive times, an NBA record.

The National Basketball Association (NBA) All-Star Game is an annual exhibition basketball game. It is the main event of the NBA All-Star Weekend. Traditionally, the All-Star Game featured a conference-based format, featuring a team composed of all of the top ranked basketball players in the Eastern Conference and another team of all-stars from the Western Conference. From 2018 to 2023, the NBA employed a different format featuring two teams captained by the top leading vote-getter from each conference. For the 2025 game, a tournament-based format was used, featuring three teams composed of NBA All-Stars, and a fourth team represented by a mix of NBA rookies, sophomores and NBA G League standouts that won the Rising Stars Challenge.^{[e]} The 2026 game featured a tournament, but with two teams consisting of "U.S." All-Stars and one "World" All-Star team. Following the selection of the all-star starters and reserves, the captains choose from a pool of all-stars to form their teams regardless of conference. Twelve players—five starters and seven reserves—from each conference are chosen from what used to be a pool of 120 players—60 players from each conference with 24 guards and 24 frontcourts (forwards and centers)—listed on the ballots by a panel of sport writers and broadcasters to all active players. The starters are chosen by a combination of fans, media, and current players. Fans may vote using a variety of online platforms, and account for 50% of the vote, with the media and current players each accounting for 25%. The reserves are chosen by voting among the head coaches of each team's particular conference. Coaches are not allowed to vote for their own players, and can select two guards, three front court players, and two players regardless of positions. If a player is unable to participate due to injury, the NBA commissioner will select a replacement. The league canceled the 1999 All-Star Game due to the lockout.

== List ==
The following is a list of players who have been selected for the NBA All-Star Game at least once in their career. Note that the number indicates the player's number of selections—not the number of games played. For instance, Michael Jordan was named to the All-Star Game roster 15 times, but missed the 1986 game due to injury. As of February 12, 2026, 466 players have been selected to an All-Star Game roster at least once. Of these, 322 of them have earned multiple selections to the game.

LeBron James holds the record for most All-Star Game selections (22), most consecutive selections (22), most games played (20), and most consecutive games played (20). Kareem Abdul-Jabbar is second in overall selections with 19. Kobe Bryant is second in consecutive selections with 17. Bob Cousy and John Havlicek are tied for second most consecutive games played, appearing in 13 straight All-Star Games. Tim Duncan also played in 13 straight All-Star Games if the lockout-cancelled 1999 game is excluded; he also owns the record for the most All-Star Games played without missing a game. Several players were named to All-Star Game rosters, but never actually played in the game due to injury.

At age 19, Kobe Bryant was the youngest All-Star selected when he made his All-Star Game debut in 1998, as well as the only player under 20 years old to be selected. Three players have been named NBA All-Stars after turning 40 years old: Kareem Abdul-Jabbar, Dirk Nowitzki, and LeBron James. Abdul-Jabbar and James were selected to multiple All-Star Games after turning 40, each with two selections. Nathaniel Clifton in 1957 was the oldest player to be selected to his first All-Star Game, at 34 years and 3 months old. Sam Cassell (2004) and Anthony Mason (2001) were the only other players aged 34 or older to be selected to their first All-Star Game.

There have been 45 rookies who were named NBA All-Stars. However, in the draft lottery era (since 1985), the number of rookies selected to All-Star rosters became even rarer, with only eight rookies selected since, and none with at least two rookies in a game. The 1985 NBA All-Star Game was the most recent game to feature two rookies, with Michael Jordan and Hakeem Olajuwon being selected. Blake Griffin in 2011 is the most recent rookie to be named an All-Star, and Yao Ming in 2003 is the most recent rookie to start in an All-Star Game.

#	The number of times the player has been selected to play in the All-Star Game
^	Denotes player who is still active as of the 2025–26 season
*	Elected to the Naismith Memorial Basketball Hall of Fame
†	Not yet eligible for Hall of Fame consideration
§	1st time eligible for Hall of Fame in 2027

Note: Statistics accurate as of the 2026 NBA All-Star Game.

Player	#	Selections^{[c]}	Nationality	Notes	Reference
LeBron James^	22	2005–2026	(United States)	Missed 2025 game. Team captain in 2018, 2019, 2020, 2021, 2022, 2023, and 2024 games. MVP of the 2006, 2008, and 2018 games.	
Kareem Abdul-Jabbar*^{[a]}	19	1970–1977; 1979–1989	(United States)	Missed 1973 game. Replacement selection in 1989 game.	
Kobe Bryant*	18	1998; 2000–2016	(United States)	Missed 2010, 2014, and 2015 games. MVP of 2002, 2007, 2009 (co-MVP with Shaquille O'Neal), and 2011 games.	
Kevin Durant^	16	2010–2019; 2021–2026	(United States)	Missed 2021, 2022, and 2023 games. Team captain in 2021 and 2022 games. MVP of the 2012 and 2019 games.	
Tim Duncan*	15	1998; 2000–2011; 2013; 2015	(United States Virgin Islands) ^{[f]}		
Kevin Garnett*	15	1997–1998; 2000–2011; 2013	(United States)	Missed 2008 game. MVP of the 2003 game. Replacement selection in 1997 game.	
Shaquille O'Neal*	15	1993–1998; 2000–2007; 2009	(United States)	Missed 1997, 2001, and 2002 games. MVP of 2000, 2004, and 2009 (co-MVP with Kobe Bryant) games.	
Michael Jordan*	14	1985–1993; 1996–1998; 2002–2003	(United States)	Missed 1986 game. MVP of 1988, 1996, and 1998 games.	
Karl Malone*	14	1988–1998; 2000–2002	(United States)	Missed 1990 and 2002 games.	
Dirk Nowitzki*	14	2002–2012; 2014–2015; 2019	(Germany)	Replacement selection in 2015 game. Special roster selection in 2019 game.	
Jerry West*	14	1961–1974	(United States)	Missed 1969 and 1974 games.	
Wilt Chamberlain*	13	1960–1969; 1971–1973	(United States)	MVP of the 1960 game.	
Bob Cousy*	13	1951–1963	(United States)	MVP of 1954 and 1957 games.	
John Havlicek*	13	1966–1978	(United States)		
Dwyane Wade*	13	2005–2016; 2019	(United States)	Missed 2015 game. MVP of the 2010 game. Special roster selection in 2019 game.	
Larry Bird*	12	1980–1988; 1990–1992	(United States)	Missed 1991 and 1992 games.	
Stephen Curry^	12	2014–2019; 2021–2026	(United States)	Missed 2023 and 2026 games. Team captain in 2018 game. MVP of the 2022 and 2025 games.	
Elvin Hayes*	12	1969–1980	(United States)		
Magic Johnson*	12	1980; 1982–1992	(United States)	Missed 1989 game.	
Moses Malone*	12	1978–1989	(United States)	Missed 1984 game; also a one-time ABA All-Star.	
Hakeem Olajuwon*^{[b]}	12	1985–1990; 1992–1997	(Nigeria)		
Chris Paul^{†}	12	2008–2016; 2020–2022	(United States)	Missed 2010 game. MVP of the 2013 game.	
Oscar Robertson*	12	1961–1972	(United States)	MVP of 1961, 1964, and 1969 games.	
Bill Russell*	12	1958–1969	(United States)		
Dolph Schayes*	12	1951–1962	(United States)	Missed 1952 game.	
Isiah Thomas*	12	1982–1993	(United States)	Missed 1991 game.	
Charles Barkley*	11	1987–1997	(United States)	Missed 1994 and 1997 games.	
Elgin Baylor*	11	1959–1965; 1967–1970	(United States)		
Chris Bosh*	11	2006–2016	(United States)	Missed 2009 and 2016 games.	
Julius Erving*	11	1977–1987	(United States)	Also a five-time ABA All-Star.	
Patrick Ewing*	11	1986; 1988–1997	(Jamaica)	Missed 1986 and 1997 games.	
James Harden^	11	2013–2022; 2025	(United States)	Missed 2022 game.	
Allen Iverson*	11	2000–2010	(United States)	Missed 2007 and 2010 games. MVP of the 2001 and 2005 games.	
Bob Pettit*	11	1955–1965	(United States)		
Ray Allen*	10	2000–2002; 2004–2009; 2011	(United States)	Replacement selection in 2007, 2008, and 2009 games.	
Giannis Antetokounmpo^	10	2017–2026	(Greece)	Team captain in 2019, 2020, 2023 and 2024 games. MVP of the 2021 game. Missed 2025 and 2026 games.	
Carmelo Anthony*	10	2007–2008; 2010–2017	(United States)	Replacement selection in 2007 and 2017 games.	
Paul Arizin*	10	1951–1952; 1955–1962	(United States)	Missed 1960 game.	
Anthony Davis^	10	2014–2021; 2024–2025	(United States)	Missed 2015, 2021, and 2025 games. Replacement selection in 2014 game. MVP of the 2017 game.	
Clyde Drexler*	10	1986; 1988–1994; 1996–1997	(United States)	Missed 1997 game.	
Hal Greer*	10	1961–1970	(United States)		
Jason Kidd*	10	1996; 1998; 2000–2004; 2007–2008; 2010	(United States)	Missed 2007 game. Replacement selection in 2010 game.	
Paul Pierce*	10	2002–2006; 2008–2012	(United States)		
David Robinson*	10	1990–1996; 1998; 2000–2001	(United States)		
John Stockton*	10	1989–1997; 2000	(United States)		
Paul George^	9	2013–2014; 2016–2019; 2021; 2023–2024	(United States)	Replacement selection in 2018 game.	
George Gervin*	9	1977–1985	(United States)	Also a three-time ABA All-Star.	
Kyrie Irving^	9	2013–2015; 2017–2019; 2021; 2023; 2025	(United States) ^{[g]}	MVP of the 2014 game. Replacement selection in 2025 game.	
Damian Lillard^	9	2014–2015; 2018–2021; 2023–2025	(United States)	Missed 2020 game. Replacement selection in 2015 game. MVP of the 2024 game.	
Robert Parish*	9	1981–1987; 1990–1991	(United States)		
Gary Payton*	9	1994–1998; 2000–2003	(United States)	Replacement selection in 1994 game.	
Russell Westbrook^{†}	9	2011–2013; 2015–2020	(United States)	MVP of the 2015 and 2016 games.	
Lenny Wilkens*	9	1963–1965; 1967–1971; 1973	(United States)		
Dominique Wilkins*	9	1986–1994	(United States) ^{[h]}	Missed 1992 game.	
Rick Barry*	8	1966–1967; 1973–1978	(United States)	Missed 1973 game; also a four-time ABA All-Star.	
Vince Carter*	8	2000–2007	(United States)	Missed 2002 game.	
Dave Cowens*	8	1972–1978; 1980	(United States)	Missed 1977 and 1980 games.	
Dave DeBusschere*	8	1966–1968; 1970–1974	(United States)		
Alex English*	8	1982–1989	(United States)		
Larry Foust	8	1951–1956; 1958–1959	(United States)	Missed 1952 game.	
Dwight Howard*	8	2007–2014	(United States)		
Nikola Jokić^	8	2019–2026	(Serbia)		
Bob Lanier*	8	1972–1975; 1977–1979; 1982	(United States)	MVP of the 1974 game. Replacement selection in 1979 game.	
Dikembe Mutombo*	8	1992; 1995–1998; 2000–2002	(Democratic Republic of the Congo)	Replacement selection in 1995 and 2001 games.	
Steve Nash*	8	2002–2003; 2005–2008; 2010; 2012	(Canada) ^{[i]}	Missed 2007 game.	
Bill Sharman*	8	1953–1960	(United States)		
Yao Ming*	8	2003–2009; 2011	(China)	Missed 2007 and 2011 games.	
LaMarcus Aldridge	7	2012–2016; 2018–2019	(United States)		
Dave Bing*	7	1968–1969; 1971; 1973–1976	(United States)		
Joel Embiid^	7	2018–2024	(Cameroon)	Missed 2021 and 2024 games.	
Walt Frazier*	7	1970–1976	(United States)		
Harry Gallatin*	7	1951–1957	(United States)		
Grant Hill*	7	1995–1998; 2000–2001; 2005	(United States)	Missed 2001 game.	
Joe Johnson	7	2007–2012; 2014	(United States)	Missed 2012 game. Replacement in 2007 game.	
Kawhi Leonard^	7	2016–2017; 2019–2021; 2024; 2026	(United States)	MVP of the 2020 game.	
Jerry Lucas*	7	1964–1969; 1971	(United States)		
Ed Macauley*	7	1951–1957	(United States)		
Slater Martin*	7	1953–1959	(United States)		
Tracy McGrady*	7	2001–2007	(United States)		
Dick McGuire*	7	1951–1952; 1954–1956; 1958–1959	(United States)		
Kevin McHale*	7	1984; 1986–1991	(United States)		
Donovan Mitchell^	7	2020–2026	(United States)		
Alonzo Mourning*	7	1994–1997; 2000–2002	(United States)	Missed 1994, 1997, and 2001 games.	
Scottie Pippen*	7	1990; 1992–1997	(United States)		
Willis Reed*	7	1965–1971	(United States)		
Jack Sikma*	7	1979–1985	(United States)		
Nate Thurmond*	7	1965–1968; 1970; 1973–1974	(United States)	Missed 1968 and 1970 games.	
Chet Walker*	7	1964; 1966–1967; 1970–1971; 1973–1974	(United States)		
Jo Jo White*	7	1971–1977	(United States)		
James Worthy*	7	1986–1992	(United States)		
Nate Archibald*	6	1973; 1975–1976; 1980–1982	(United States)		
Jimmy Butler^	6	2015–2018; 2020; 2022	(United States)	Missed 2016 game.	
Larry Costello	6	1958–1962; 1965	(United States)	Missed 1962 game; inducted as a contributor.	
Adrian Dantley*	6	1980–1982; 1984–1986	(United States)		
Walter Davis*	6	1978–1981; 1984; 1987	(United States)		
DeMar DeRozan^	6	2014; 2016–2018; 2022–2023	(United States)		
Luka Dončić^	6	2020–2024; 2026	(Slovenia)		
Joe Dumars*	6	1990–1993; 1995; 1997	(United States)	Replacement selection in 1997 game.	
Pau Gasol*	6	2006; 2009–2011; 2015–2016	(Spain)	Replacement selection in 2016 game.	
Artis Gilmore*	6	1978–1979; 1981–1983; 1986	(United States)	Also a five-time ABA All-Star.	
Blake Griffin	6	2011–2015; 2019	(United States)	Missed 2015 game.	
Richie Guerin*	6	1958–1963	(United States)		
Tom Heinsohn*	6	1957; 1961–1965	(United States)	Missed 1965 game.	
Bailey Howell*	6	1961–1964; 1966–1967	(United States)		
Lou Hudson*	6	1969–1974	(United States)		
Neil Johnston*	6	1953–1958	(United States)		
Shawn Kemp	6	1993–1998	(United States)		
Kyle Lowry^{†}	6	2015–2020	(United States)		
Vern Mikkelsen*	6	1951–1953; 1955–1957	(United States)		
Jermaine O'Neal	6	2002–2007	(United States)	Missed 2006 game.	
Tony Parker*	6	2006–2007; 2009; 2012–2014	(France) ^{[j]}		
Mitch Richmond*	6	1993–1998	(United States)	Missed 1993 game.	
Amar'e Stoudemire*	6	2005; 2007–2011	(United States)		
Jayson Tatum^	6	2020–2025	(United States)		
Karl-Anthony Towns^	6	2018–2019; 2022; 2024–2026	(Dominican Republic)		
Jack Twyman*	6	1957–1960; 1962–1963	(United States)		
George Yardley*	6	1955–1960	(United States)		
Chauncey Billups*	5	2006–2010	(United States)	Replacement selection in 2010 game.	
Devin Booker^	5	2020–2022; 2024; 2026	(United States)	Missed 2021 game. Replacement selection in 2020 and 2021 games.	
Carl Braun*	5	1953–1957	(United States)	Missed 1956 game.	
Jaylen Brown^	5	2021; 2023–2026	(United States)		
Brad Daugherty	5	1988–1989; 1991–1993	(United States)		
Wayne Embry*	5	1961–1965	(United States)	Missed 1963 game; inducted as a contributor.	
Tom Gola*	5	1960–1964	(United States)	Missed 1962 game.	
Gail Goodrich*	5	1969; 1972–1975	(United States)	Replacement selection in 1969 game.	
Cliff Hagan*	5	1958–1962	(United States)	Missed 1958 game; also a one-time ABA All-Star.	
Tim Hardaway*	5	1991–1993; 1997–1998	(United States)		
Al Horford^	5	2010–2011; 2015–2016; 2018	(Dominican Republic)	Replacement selection in 2016 game.	
Dennis Johnson*	5	1979–1982; 1985	(United States)		
Gus Johnson*	5	1965; 1968–1971	(United States)		
Marques Johnson	5	1979–1981; 1983; 1986	(United States)		
Sam Jones*	5	1962; 1964–1966; 1968	(United States)		
Rudy LaRusso	5	1962–1963; 1966; 1968–1969	(United States)	Missed 1962 game.	
Kevin Love^{†}	5	2011–2012; 2014; 2017–2018	(United States)	Missed 2017 and 2018 games. Replacement selection in 2011 game.	
Pete Maravich*	5	1973–1974; 1977–1979	(United States)	Missed 1978 game	
Bob McAdoo*	5	1974–1978	(United States)		
Reggie Miller*	5	1990; 1995–1996; 1998; 2000	(United States)		
Sidney Moncrief*	5	1982–1986	(United States)		
Chris Mullin*	5	1989–1993	(United States)	Missed 1993 game.	
Don Ohl	5	1963–1967	(United States)		
Andy Phillip*	5	1951–1955	(United States)		
Gene Shue	5	1958–1962	(United States)		
Klay Thompson^	5	2015–2019	(United States)		
Rudy Tomjanovich	5	1974–1977; 1979	(United States)	Inducted as a coach.	
Wes Unseld*	5	1969; 1971–1973; 1975	(United States)		
John Wall	5	2014–2018	(United States)	Missed 2018 game.	
Bobby Wanzer*	5	1952–1956	(United States)		
Chris Webber*	5	1997; 2000–2003	(United States)	Missed 2003 game. Replacement selection in 1997 game.	
Paul Westphal*	5	1977–1981	(United States)		
Vin Baker	4	1995–1998	(United States)		
Walt Bellamy*	4	1962–1965	(United States)		
Otis Birdsong	4	1979–1981; 1984	(United States)		
Rolando Blackman	4	1985–1987; 1990	(Panama)	Replacement selection in 1990 game.	
Tom Chambers	4	1987; 1989–1991	(United States)	Replacement selection in 1987 game and also game's MVP.	
Maurice Cheeks*	4	1983; 1986–1988	(United States)		
Doug Collins	4	1976–1979	(United States)	Missed 1979 game.	
DeMarcus Cousins	4	2015–2018	(United States)	Missed 2018 game. Replacement selection in 2015 game.	
Billy Cunningham*	4	1969–1972	(United States)	Also a one-time ABA All-Star.	
Bob Dandridge*	4	1973; 1975–1976; 1979	(United States)		
Bob Davies*	4	1951–1954	(United States)		
Anthony Edwards^	4	2023–2026	(United States)	Missed 2025 game. MVP of the 2026 game. Replacement selection in 2023 game.	
Dick Garmaker	4	1957–1960	(United States)		
Shai Gilgeous-Alexander^	4	2023–2026	(Canada)	Missed 2026 game.	
Draymond Green^	4	2016–2018; 2022	(United States)	Missed 2022 game.	
Johnny Green	4	1962–1963; 1965; 1971	(United States)		
Penny Hardaway	4	1995–1998	(United States)		
Connie Hawkins*	4	1970–1973	(United States)	Also a one-time ABA All-Star.	
Spencer Haywood*	4	1972–1975	(United States)	Also a one-time ABA All-Star.	
Mel Hutchins	4	1953–1954; 1956–1957	(United States)		
Bobby Jones*	4	1977–1978; 1981–1982	(United States)	Also a two-time ABA All-Star.	
Bernard King*	4	1982; 1984–1985; 1991	(United States)		
Bill Laimbeer	4	1983–1985; 1987	(United States)	Replacement selection in 1984 and 1985 games.	
Clyde Lovellette*	4	1956–1957; 1960–1961	(United States)		
Maurice Lucas	4	1977–1979; 1983	(United States)	Also a one-time ABA All-Star.	
Shawn Marion	4	2003; 2005–2007	(United States)		
George Mikan*	4	1951–1954	(United States)		
Paul Millsap	4	2014–2017	(United States)		
Earl Monroe*	4	1969; 1971; 1975; 1977	(United States)		
Willie Naulls	4	1958; 1960–1962	(United States)		
Jim Pollard*	4	1951–1952; 1954–1955	(United States)		
Mark Price	4	1989; 1992–1994	(United States)		
Micheal Ray Richardson	4	1980–1982; 1985	(United States)		
Arnie Risen*	4	1952–1955	(United States)	Missed 1955 game.	
Alvin Robertson	4	1986–1988; 1991	(United States)		
Guy Rodgers*	4	1963–1964; 1966–1967	(United States)		
Rajon Rondo	4	2010–2013	(United States)	Missed 2013 game. Replacement selection in 2012 game.	
Ralph Sampson*	4	1984–1987	(United States)	Missed 1987 game.	
Pascal Siakam^	4	2020; 2023; 2025–2026	(Cameroon)	Replacement selection in 2023 game.	
Latrell Sprewell	4	1994–1995; 1997; 2001	(United States)	Replacement selection in 2001 game.	
David Thompson*	4	1977–1979; 1983	(United States)	Also a one-time ABA All-Star.	
Kemba Walker	4	2017–2020	(United States)	Replacement selection in 2018 game.	
Ben Wallace*	4	2003–2006	(United States)		
Rasheed Wallace	4	2000–2001; 2006; 2008	(United States)	Replacement selection in 2008 game.	
Sidney Wicks	4	1972–1975	(United States)		
Trae Young^	4	2020; 2022; 2024–2025	(United States)	Replacement selection in 2024 and 2025 games.	
Bam Adebayo^	3	2020; 2023–2024	(United States)		
Mark Aguirre	3	1984; 1987–1988	(United States)		
Gilbert Arenas	3	2005–2007	(United States)	Replacement selection in 2006 game.	
Bradley Beal^	3	2018–2019; 2021	(United States)		
Bill Bridges	3	1967–1968; 1970	(United States)		
Jalen Brunson^	3	2024–2026	(United States)		
Phil Chenier	3	1974–1975; 1977	(United States)		
Terry Dischinger	3	1963–1965	(United States)		
Steve Francis	3	2002–2004	(United States)		
Marc Gasol	3	2012; 2015; 2017	(Spain)		
Rudy Gobert^	3	2020–2022	(France)		
Richard Hamilton	3	2006–2008	(United States)		
Kevin Johnson	3	1990–1991; 1994	(United States)		
Eddie Jones	3	1997–1998; 2000	(United States)		
Bob Kauffman	3	1971–1973	(United States)		
Johnny Kerr	3	1956; 1959; 1963	(United States)		
Bob Love	3	1971–1973	(United States)		
Dan Majerle	3	1992–1993; 1995	(United States)		
George McGinnis*	3	1976–1977; 1979	(United States)	Also a three-time ABA All-Star.	
Khris Middleton^	3	2019–2020; 2022	(United States)		
Jeff Mullins	3	1969–1971	(United States)		
Larry Nance	3	1985; 1989; 1993	(United States)		
Julius Randle^	3	2021; 2023–2024	(United States)	Missed 2024 game.	
Glen Rice	3	1996–1998	(United States)		
Derrick Rose^{§}	3	2010–2012	(United States)		
Dan Roundfield	3	1980–1982	(United States)	Missed 1981 and 1982 games.	
Brandon Roy	3	2008–2010	(United States)	Missed 2010 game.	
Domantas Sabonis^	3	2020–2021; 2023	(Lithuania)	Replacement selection in 2021 game.	
Detlef Schrempf	3	1993; 1995; 1997	(Germany)	Replacement selection in 1997 game.	
Charlie Scott*	3	1973–1975	(United States)	Also a two-time ABA All-Star.	
Paul Seymour	3	1953–1955	(United States)		
Ben Simmons^	3	2019–2021	(Australia)	Missed 2021 game.	
Peja Stojaković	3	2002–2004	(Serbia)	Replacement selection in 2003 game.	
Maurice Stokes*	3	1956–1958	(United States)		
Dick Van Arsdale	3	1969–1971	(United States)		
Tom Van Arsdale	3	1970–1972	(United States)		
Norm Van Lier	3	1974; 1976–1977	(United States)		
Antoine Walker	3	1998; 2002–2003	(United States)		
Jamaal Wilkes*	3	1976; 1981; 1983	(United States)		
Buck Williams	3	1982–1983; 1986	(United States)		
Deron Williams	3	2010–2012	(United States)		
Scottie Barnes^	2	2024; 2026	(United States)	Replacement selection in 2024 game.	
Leo Barnhorst	2	1952–1953	(United States)		
Zelmo Beaty*	2	1966; 1968	(United States)	Also a three-time ABA All-Star.	
Carlos Boozer	2	2007–2008	(United States)	Missed 2007 game.	
Elton Brand	2	2002; 2006	(United States)	Replacement selection in 2002.	
Terrell Brandon	2	1996–1997	(United States)		
Frank Brian	2	1951–1952	(United States)		
Caron Butler	2	2007–2008	(United States)	Missed 2008 game.	
Joe Caldwell	2	1969–1970	(United States)	Also a two-time ABA All-Star.	
Archie Clark	2	1968; 1972	(United States)		
Terry Cummings	2	1985; 1989	(United States)		
Cade Cunningham^	2	2025–2026	(United States)		
Baron Davis	2	2002; 2004	(United States)	Replacement selection in 2002 game.	
Luol Deng	2	2012–2013	(United Kingdom) ^{[k]}		
John Drew	2	1976; 1980	(United States)		
Andre Drummond^	2	2016; 2018	(United States)	Replacement selection in 2018 game.	
Kevin Duckworth	2	1989; 1991	(United States)		
Walter Dukes	2	1960–1961	(United States)		
Dwight Eddleman	2	1951–1952	(United States)		
Sean Elliott	2	1993; 1996	(United States)		
Michael Finley	2	2000–2001	(United States)		
De'Aaron Fox^	2	2023; 2026	(United States)	Replacement selection in 2023 and 2026 games.	
Joe Fulks*	2	1951–1952	(United States)		
Darius Garland^	2	2022; 2025	(United States)		
Jack George	2	1956–1957	(United States)		
Manu Ginóbili*	2	2005; 2011	(Argentina)		
Tyrese Haliburton^	2	2023–2024	(United States)		
Roy Hibbert	2	2012; 2014	(United States)		
Jrue Holiday^	2	2013; 2023	(United States)		
Allan Houston	2	2000–2001	(United States)		
Rod Hundley	2	1960–1961	(United States)		
Žydrūnas Ilgauskas	2	2003; 2005	(Lithuania)		
Brandon Ingram^	2	2020; 2026	(United States)	Replacement selection in 2026 game.	
Jaren Jackson Jr.^	2	2023; 2025	(United States)		
Antawn Jamison	2	2005; 2008	(United States)		
Eddie Johnson	2	1980–1981	(United States)		
John Johnson	2	1971–1972	(United States)		
Larry Johnson	2	1993; 1995	(United States)		
Larry Kenon	2	1978–1979	(United States)	Also a three-time ABA All-Star.	
Don Kojis	2	1968–1969	(United States)		
Zach LaVine^	2	2021–2022	(United States)		
David Lee	2	2010; 2013	(United States)	Replacement selection in 2010 game.	
Fat Lever	2	1988; 1990	(United States)		
Rashard Lewis	2	2005; 2009	(United States)		
Jeff Malone	2	1986–1987	(United States)		
Danny Manning	2	1993–1994	(United States)		
Stephon Marbury	2	2001; 2003	(United States)		
Jack Marin	2	1972–1973	(United States)		
Tyrese Maxey^	2	2024; 2026	(United States)		
Brad Miller	2	2003–2004	(United States)		
Ja Morant^	2	2022–2023	(United States)		
Norm Nixon	2	1982; 1985	(United States)		
Joakim Noah	2	2013–2014	(United States)		
Victor Oladipo^{§}	2	2018–2019	(United States)	Missed 2019 game.	
Jim Paxson	2	1983–1984	(United States)		
Geoff Petrie	2	1971; 1974	(United States)		
Terry Porter	2	1991; 1993	(United States)	Replacement selection in 1993 game.	
Zach Randolph	2	2010; 2013	(United States)		
Glenn Robinson	2	2000–2001	(United States)		
Truck Robinson	2	1978; 1981	(United States)		
Red Rocha	2	1951–1952	(United States)		
Dennis Rodman*	2	1990; 1992	(United States)		
Jeff Ruland	2	1984–1985	(United States)	Missed 1985 game.	
Fred Scolari	2	1952–1953	(United States)	Missed 1953 game.	
Ken Sears	2	1958–1959	(United States)		
Frank Selvy	2	1955; 1962	(United States)		
Alperen Şengün^	2	2025–2026	(Turkey)	Replacement selection in 2026 game.	
Paul Silas	2	1972; 1975	(United States)		
Jerry Sloan	2	1967; 1969	(United States)		
Phil Smith	2	1976–1977	(United States)		
Randy Smith	2	1976; 1978	(United States)		
Jerry Stackhouse	2	2000–2001	(United States)		
Reggie Theus	2	1981; 1983	(United States)		
Isaiah Thomas^{§}	2	2016–2017	(United States)		
Andrew Toney	2	1983–1984	(United States)		
Kelly Tripucka	2	1982; 1984	(United States)		
Kiki Vandeweghe	2	1983–1984	(United States)		
Nikola Vučević^	2	2019; 2021	(Montenegro) ^{[l]}		
Jimmy Walker	2	1970; 1972	(United States)		
Bill Walton*	2	1977–1978	(United States)	Missed 1977 game.	
Scott Wedman	2	1976; 1980	(United States)	Missed 1980 game.	
Victor Wembanyama^	2	2025–2026	(France)		
David West	2	2008–2009	(United States)		
Gus Williams	2	1982–1983	(United States)		
Zion Williamson^	2	2021; 2023	(United States)	Missed 2023 game.	
Brian Winters	2	1976; 1978	(United States)		
Shareef Abdur-Rahim	1	2002	(United States)		
Alvan Adams	1	1976	(United States)		
Michael Adams	1	1992	(United States)	Replacement selection in 1992 game.	
Danny Ainge	1	1988	(United States)		
Jarrett Allen^	1	2022	(United States)	Replacement selection in 2022 game.	
Kenny Anderson	1	1994	(United States)		
B. J. Armstrong	1	1994	(United States)		
Deni Avdija^	1	2026	(Israel)		
LaMelo Ball^	1	2022	(United States)	Replacement selection in 2022 game.	
Paolo Banchero^	1	2024	(United States)		
Don Barksdale*	1	1953	(United States)	Inducted as a contributor.	
Dick Barnett*	1	1968	(United States)		
Dana Barros	1	1995	(United States)		
Butch Beard	1	1972	(United States)		
Ralph Beard	1	1951	(United States)		
Mookie Blaylock	1	1994	(United States)		
John Block	1	1973	(United States)		
Bob Boozer	1	1968	(United States)		
Vince Boryla	1	1951	(United States)		
Bill Bradley*	1	1973	(United States)		
Fred Brown	1	1976	(United States)		
Don Buse	1	1977	(United States)	Also a one-time ABA All-Star.	
Andrew Bynum	1	2012	(United States)		
Austin Carr	1	1974	(United States)		
Joe Barry Carroll	1	1987	(United States)		
Bill Cartwright	1	1980	(United States)		
Sam Cassell	1	2004	(United States)		
Cedric Ceballos	1	1995	(United States)	Missed 1995 game.	
Tyson Chandler	1	2013	(United States)		
Len Chappell	1	1964	(United States)		
Nathaniel Clifton*	1	1957	(United States)		
Derrick Coleman	1	1994	(United States)		
Jack Coleman	1	1955	(United States)		
Mike Conley^	1	2021	(United States)	Replacement selection in 2021 game.	
Antonio Davis	1	2001	(United States)	Replacement selection in 2001 game.	
Dale Davis	1	2000	(United States)		
Vlade Divac*	1	2001	(Serbia)	Replacement selection in 2001 game.	
James Donaldson	1	1988	(United Kingdom)	Replacement selection in 1988 game.	
Goran Dragić	1	2018	(Slovenia)	Replacement selection in 2018 game. game	
Jalen Duren^	1	2026	(United States)		
Mark Eaton	1	1989	(United States)		
Dale Ellis	1	1989	(United States)		
Ray Felix	1	1954	(United States)		
Sleepy Floyd	1	1987	(United States)		
World B. Free	1	1980	(United States)		
Billy Gabor	1	1953	(United States)		
Chris Gatling	1	1997	(United States)	Replacement selection in 1997 game.	
Danny Granger	1	2009	(United States)		
Horace Grant	1	1994	(United States)		
A.C. Green	1	1990	(United States)		
Rickey Green	1	1984	(United States)		
Alex Groza	1	1951	(United States)		
Tom Gugliotta	1	1997	(United States)		
Devin Harris	1	2009	(United States)		
Bob Harrison	1	1956	(United States)		
Hersey Hawkins	1	1991	(United States)	Replacement selection in 1991 game.	
Gordon Hayward^{§}	1	2017	(United States)		
Walt Hazzard	1	1968	(United States)		
Tyler Herro^	1	2025	(United States)		
Tyrone Hill	1	1995	(United States)		
Lionel Hollins	1	1978	(United States)		
Chet Holmgren^	1	2026	(United States)		
Jeff Hornacek	1	1992	(United States)		
Josh Howard	1	2007	(United States)		
Juwan Howard	1	1996	(United States)		
Andre Iguodala	1	2012	(United States)		
Darrall Imhoff	1	1967	(United States)		
Dan Issel*	1	1977	(United States)	Also a six-time ABA All-Star.	
Lucious Jackson	1	1965	(United States)		
Mark Jackson	1	1989	(United States)		
Jalen Johnson^	1	2026	(United States)		
Steve Johnson	1	1988	(United States)	Missed 1988 game.	
DeAndre Jordan^	1	2017	(United States)		
Chris Kaman	1	2010	(United States)	Replacement selection in 2010 game.	
Jim King	1	1968	(United States)		
Andrei Kirilenko	1	2004	(Russia)		
Billy Knight	1	1977	(United States)	Also a one-time ABA All-Star.	
Kyle Korver	1	2015	(United States)	Replacement selection in 2015 game.	
Sam Lacey	1	1975	(United States)		
Christian Laettner	1	1997	(United States)		
Clyde Lee	1	1968	(United States)		
Reggie Lewis	1	1992	(United States)		
Brook Lopez^	1	2013	(United States)	Replacement selection in 2013 game.	
Jamaal Magloire	1	2004	(Canada)		
Lauri Markkanen^	1	2023	(Finland)		
Kenyon Martin	1	2004	(United States)		
Jamal Mashburn	1	2003	(United States)		
Anthony Mason	1	2001	(United States)		
Xavier McDaniel	1	1988	(United States)		
Antonio McDyess	1	2001	(United States)		
Jon McGlocklin	1	1969	(United States)		
Tom Meschery	1	1963	(United States)		
Eddie Miles	1	1966	(United States)		
Mike Mitchell	1	1981	(United States)		
Steve Mix	1	1975	(United States)		
Evan Mobley^	1	2025	(United States)		
Jack Molinas	1	1954	(United States)	Missed 1954 game.	
Calvin Murphy*	1	1979	(United States)		
Dejounte Murray^	1	2022	(United States)	Replacement selection in 2022 game.	
Jamal Murray^	1	2026	(Canada)		
Calvin Natt	1	1985	(United States)		
Jameer Nelson	1	2009	(United States)	Missed 2009 game.	
Chuck Noble	1	1960	(United States)		
Charles Oakley	1	1994	(United States)	Replacement selection in 1994 game.	
Mehmet Okur	1	2007	(Turkey)		
Ricky Pierce	1	1991	(United States)		
Kristaps Porziņģis^	1	2018	(Latvia)	Missed 2018 game.	
Jim Price	1	1975	(United States)		
Norman Powell^	1	2026	(Jamaica)		
Theo Ratliff	1	2001	(United States)	Missed 2001 game.	
Michael Redd	1	2004	(United States)		
Richie Regan	1	1957	(United States)		
Doc Rivers	1	1988	(United States)		
Clifford Robinson	1	1994	(United States)		
Flynn Robinson	1	1970	(United States)		
Curtis Rowe	1	1976	(United States)		
Bob Rule	1	1970	(United States)		
Campy Russell	1	1979	(United States)		
Cazzie Russell	1	1972	(United States)		
D'Angelo Russell^	1	2019	(United States)	Replacement selection in 2019 game.	
Woody Sauldsberry	1	1959	(United States)		
Fred Schaus	1	1951	(United States)		
Lee Shaffer	1	1963	(United States)		
Lonnie Shelton	1	1982	(United States)		
Adrian Smith	1	1966	(United States)		
Steve Smith	1	1998	(United States)		
Rik Smits	1	1998	(Netherlands)		
John Starks	1	1994	(United States)		
Don Sunderlage	1	1954	(United States)		
Wally Szczerbiak	1	2002	(United States)		
Jeff Teague	1	2015	(United States)		
Otis Thorpe	1	1992	(United States)		
Nick Van Exel	1	1998	(United States)		
Fred VanVleet^	1	2022	(United States)		
Gerald Wallace	1	2010	(United States)		
Paul Walther	1	1952	(United States)		
Kermit Washington	1	1980	(United States)		
Andrew Wiggins^	1	2022	(Canada)		
Jalen Williams^	1	2025	(United States)		
Jayson Williams	1	1998	(United States)		
Mo Williams	1	2009	(United States)	Replacement selection in 2009 game.	
Kevin Willis	1	1992	(United States)	Replacement selection in 1992 game.	
Metta World Peace^{[d]}	1	2004	(United States)		
Max Zaslofsky	1	1952	(United States)		

== Notes and references ==
Notes

- ^{a} Before the 1971–72 season, Lew Alcindor changed his name to Kareem Abdul-Jabbar. He missed the 1973 All-Star Game for personal reasons.
- ^{b} When Hakeem Olajuwon arrived in the United States, the University of Houston incorrectly spelled his first name "Akeem". Olajuwon used that spelling until March 9, 1991, when he announced that he would add an H.
- ^{c} This column does not include American Basketball Association (ABA) All-Star Game selections.
- ^{d} Before the 2011–12 season, Ron Artest changed his name to Metta World Peace.
- ^{e} The list excludes players from the Rising Stars Challenge who competed in the All-Star Game tournament, as they are not officially considered NBA All-Stars.
- ^{f} Although Tim Duncan was born in the U.S. Virgin Islands and is a United States citizen, the NBA considers him an international player.
- ^{g} Kyrie Irving, who was born in Australia, was raised in America, and has played for the USA Basketball National Team.
- ^{h} Dominique Wilkins, who was born in Paris, settled down in America, and has played for the USA Basketball National Team.
- ^{i} Steve Nash, who was born in South Africa, was raised in Canada.
- ^{j} Tony Parker was born in Belgium. He holds French citizenship and plays for their national team.
- ^{k} Luol Deng, who was born in Sudan (now South Sudan), was raised in Great Britain, became a naturalized British citizen, and represented England and Great Britain internationally.
- ^{l} Nikola Vučević, who was born in Switzerland, was raised in Belgium and represents Montenegro internationally.
- "All-Star Game Selections by Player". basketball-reference.com. Sports Reference LLC. Archived from the original on October 14, 2012.

Specific
