= Coach Wooden "Keys to Life" Award =

Award in U.S. basketball

- Awarded for: Qualities exemplified by Coach John Wooden: outstanding character, integrity, and leadership on the court, in the work place, in the home, and in the community
- Location: Wooden Family Fieldhouse (Xenia, Ohio)
- Country: United States
- Presented by: Athletes in Action

History
- First award: 1998
- Most recent: Steve Alford
- Website: Official website

The Coach Wooden "Keys to Life" Award is presented annually to a member of the college or professional basketball community who lives out qualities exemplified by coach John Wooden: outstanding character, integrity, and leadership on the court, in the work place, in the home, and in the community. The award was established in 1998 and was named for Wooden, who coached at Indiana State and UCLA, compiling an overall record of 664–162 with 10 national championships. He was inducted into the Naismith Basketball Hall of Fame both as a player (1960) and as a coach (1973), as well as being inducted into the National Collegiate Basketball Hall of Fame in 2006.

== Key ==
| † | Multiple recipients in same season |
| HOF | Year inducted into the Naismith Basketball Hall of Fame |
| CBHOF | Year inducted into the National Collegiate Basketball Hall of Fame |

== Winners ==
| Season | Recipient(s) | Notes | HOF | CBHOF | Reference |
|---|---|---|---|---|---|
| 1997–98 | Marv Harshman | Coached Pacific Lutheran (1945–1958), Washington State (1958–1971), and Washington (1971–1985) | 1985 | 2006 | |
| 1998–99 | A. C. Green | NBA All-Star (1990) and 3× NBA champion (1987, 1988, 2000) | — | — | |
| 1999–00 | Jerry Colangelo | Coached Phoenix Suns (1970, 1972–1973); 4× NBA Executive of the Year (1977, 1982, 1990, 1994); and USA Basketball Director (2005–2021) | — | — | |
| 2000–01 | Junior Bridgeman | 12-year NBA veteran (1975–1987) and 2× Missouri Valley Conference Player of the Year (1974, 1975) | — | — | |
| 2001–02 | Mark Price | 4× NBA All-Star (1989, 1992–1994) and All-NBA First Team (1993); and 2× NBA Three-Point Contest champion (1993, 1994) | — | — | |
| 2002–03 | Clark Kellogg | NBA All-Rookie First Team (1983) and CBS College Basketball analyst (1997–present) | — | — | |
| 2003–04 | David Robinson | NBA MVP (1995); 2× NBA champion (1999, 2003); 2× NBA anniversary teams (50th, 75th); and NCAA player of the year (1987) | 2009 | — | |
| 2004–05 | Bobby Jones | NBA champion (1983); 4× NBA All-Star (1977, 1978, 1981, 1982); ABA All-Star (1976); and consensus second-team NCAA All-American (1974) | 2019 | — | |
| 2005–06 | Lorenzo Romar | Coached Pepperdine (1996–1999; 2018–2024), Saint Louis (1999–2002), and Washington (2002–2017) | — | — | |
| 2006–07 | Jim Haney | Coached Oregon (1978–1983); commissioner of three conferences (1983–1992); and NABC Executive Director (1992–2020) | — | — | |
| 2007–08 | Hubert Davis | 12-year NBA veteran (1992–2004); coached North Carolina (2021–2026); and ESPN College Basketball commentator (2007–2012) | — | — | |
| 2008–09 | David Thompson | 4× NBA All-Star (1977–1979, 1983); ABA All-Time Team (1997); NCAA champion (1974); and 2× NCAA player of the year (1974, 1975) | 1996 | 2006 | |
| 2009–10 | Don Meyer | Coached Hamline (1972–1975), Lipscomb (1975–1999), and Northern State (1999–2010); and NAIA national champion (1986) | — | — | |
| 2010–11 | Charlie Ward | Basketball and football multi-sport star: Heisman Trophy (1993); NCAA football national champion (1993); 11-year NBA veteran who led New York Knicks to 1999 NBA Finals | — | — | |
| 2011–12 | Homer Drew | Coached Bethel (IN) (1976–1987), Indiana–South Bend (1987–1988), and Valparaiso (1998–2002; 2003–2011) | — | 2019 | |
| 2012–13 | Dick Bennett | Coached Wisconsin–Stevens Point (1976–1985), Green Bay (1985–1995), Wisconsin (1995–2001), and Washington State (2003–2006); NAIA Coach of the Year (1984) | — | — | |
| 2013–14 | Del Harris | NBA Coach of the Year (1994); coached Houston Rockets (1979–1983), Milwaukee Bucks (1987–1991), and Los Angeles Lakers (1994–1999) | 2022 | — | |
| 2014–15 | Danny Miles | Coached Oregon Tech (1971–2016); 3× NAIA Division II champion; 2× NAIA Coach of the Year (2004, 2008); and NABC NAIA Division II Coach of the Year (2012) | — | 2018 | |
| 2015–16 | Cazzie Russell | NBA champion (1970); NBA All-Star (1972); NCAA player of the year (1966); and 2× consensus first-team NCAA All-American (1965, 1966) | — | 2011 | |
| 2016–17^{†} | Gary Cunningham | Long-time assistant to John Wooden at UCLA (1965–1975) then head coach (1977–1979); athletic director at four other schools (1979–2008) | — | — | |
| 2016–17^{†} | Paul Westphal | NBA champion (1974); 5× NBA All-Star (1977–1981); 2× NBA All-Star Game head coach (1993, 1995); and NAIA champion (1988) | 2019 | 2018 | |
| 2017–18 | Rick Barnes | Coached George Mason (1987–1988), Providence (1988–1994), Clemson (1994–1998), Texas (1998–2015), and Tennessee (2015–present) | — | — | |
| 2018–19 | John Beilein | Coached six NCAA teams (1982–2019), the NBA's Cleveland Cavaliers (2019–2020) and NIT champion (2007) | — | 2022 | |
| 2019–20 | Not awarded | | | | |
| 2020–21^{†} | Billy Kennedy | Billy coached Centenary (1997–1999), Southeastern Louisiana (1999–2005), Murray State (2006–2011), and Texas A&M (2011–2019); his wife Mary made them the first couple to receive this award | — | — | |
| 2020–21^{†} | Mary Kennedy | Billy coached Centenary (1997–1999), Southeastern Louisiana (1999–2005), Murray State (2006–2011), and Texas A&M (2011–2019); his wife Mary made them the first couple to receive this award | — | — | |
| 2021–22 | Allan Houston | 2× NBA All-Star (2000, 2001) and 12-year NBA veteran (1993–2005) | — | — | |
| 2022–23 | Scott Drew | Coached Valparaiso (2002–2003) and Baylor (2003–present); NCAA champion (2021) | — | — | |
| 2023–24 | Lionel Hollins | NBA champion (1977); NBA All-Star (1978); and coached the Vancouver Grizzlies (1999–2000), Memphis Grizzlies (2004; 2009–2013), and Brooklyn Nets (2014–2016) | — | — | |
| 2024–25 | Monty Williams | NBA Coach of the Year (2022); NBA All-Star Game head coach (2022); and coached the New Orleans Hornets / Pelicans (2010–2015), Phoenix Suns (2019–2023), and Detroit Pistons (2023–2024) | — | — | |
| 2025–26 | Steve Alford | NCAA champion (1987); 2× consensus first-team NCAA All-American (1986, 1987); and coached six college teams (1991–present) | — | — | |
