= 1957 NBA All-Star Game =

Exhibition basketball game

	1	2	3	4	Total
East	18	23	33	35	109
West	26	17	23	31	97
- Date: Tuesday, January 15, 1957
- Arena: Boston Garden
- City: Boston
- MVP: Bob Cousy
- Attendance: 11,178
- Network: WPIX
- Announcers: Bob Wolff, Sonny Hertzberg and Jack McCarthy (in the studio)

NBA All-Star Game
< 1956	1958 >

The 7th Annual NBA All Star Game was an exhibition basketball game held on January 15, 1957, at the Boston Garden in Boston, home of the Boston Celtics. This was the third NBA All-Star Game to be held in Boston, after the first two editions were held there in 1951 and 1952.

The coaches were the Celtics' Red Auerbach for the East and the Rochester Royals' Bobby Wanzer for the West, as both the Celtics and the Royals had led their respective divisions entering the month of January. With the score 43–39 in favor of the West and with time running out in the first half, the East's Bill Sharman attempted to throw a long pass to Bob Cousy. Instead, the play resulted in him making a remarkable 70-foot (21 m) shot to end the first half, narrowing the West's lead by just two. The East eventually came back and won the game 109–97. Bob Cousy was named the Most Valuable Player.

Aside from the game, the event was the first to feature a side event, particularly the inaugural NBA Old-Timers Game featuring retired players. After which, the side game entered a hiatus until it was restored in 1964.

== Roster ==
Eastern All-Stars
Pos.	Player	Team	No. of selections
Starters
F	Paul Arizin	Philadelphia Warriors	5th
G	Bob Cousy	Boston Celtics	7th
F/C	Harry Gallatin	New York Knickerbockers	7th
F/C	Dolph Schayes	Syracuse Nationals	7th
G	Bill Sharman	Boston Celtics	5th
Reserves
G	Carl Braun	New York Knickerbockers	5th
F/C	Nathaniel Clifton	New York Knickerbockers	1st
G	Jack George	Philadelphia Warriors	2nd
F	Tom Heinsohn	Boston Celtics	1st
C	Neil Johnston	Philadelphia Warriors	5th
Head coach: Red Auerbach (Boston Celtics)

Western All-Stars
Pos.	Player	Team	No. of selections
Starters
G	Dick Garmaker	Minneapolis Lakers	1st
G	Slater Martin	St. Louis Hawks	5th
F/C	Bob Pettit	St. Louis Hawks	3rd
F/C	Maurice Stokes	Rochester Royals	2nd
F/G	George Yardley	Fort Wayne Pistons	3rd
Reserves
F/C	Mel Hutchins	Fort Wayne Pistons	4th
C	Clyde Lovellette	Minneapolis Lakers	2nd
F/C	Ed Macauley	St. Louis Hawks	7th
F/C	Vern Mikkelsen	Minneapolis Lakers	6th
G	Richie Regan	Rochester Royals	1st
G/F	Jack Twyman	Rochester Royals	1st
Head coach:Bobby Wanzer (Rochester Royals)

Legend
	Starter		MVP	MIN	Minutes played
FG	Field goals	FGA	Field goal attempts	FT	Free throws	FTA	Free throw attempts
REB	Rebounds	AST	Assists	PF	Personal fouls	PTS	Points

== Eastern Division ==
Head Coach: Red Auerbach, Boston Celtics

Player	Team	MIN	FG	FGA	FT	FTA	REB	AST	PF	PTS
Bob Cousy	Boston Celtics	28	4	14	2	2	5	7	0	10
Paul Arizin	Philadelphia Warriors	26	6	13	1	2	5	0	2	13
Dolph Schayes	Syracuse Nationals	25	4	6	1	1	10	1	1	9
Harry Gallatin	New York Knicks	24	4	7	0	2	11	1	3	8
Bill Sharman	Boston Celtics	23	5	17	2	2	6	5	1	12
Carl Braun	New York Knicks	24	4	9	2	2	3	2	2	10
Neil Johnston	Philadelphia Warriors	23	8	12	3	3	9	1	2	19
Tom Heinsohn	Boston Celtics	23	5	17	2	2	7	0	3	12
Nathaniel Clifton	New York Knicks	23	4	11	0	0	11	3	1	8
Jack George	Philadelphia Warriors	21	3	6	2	2	1	5	1	8
Totals		240	47	112	15	18	68	25	16	109

== Western Division ==
Head Coach: Bobby Wanzer, Rochester Royals

Player	Team	MIN	FG	FGA	FT	FTA	REB	AST	PF	PTS
Bob Pettit	St. Louis Hawks	31	8	18	5	6	11	2	2	21
Maurice Stokes	Rochester Royals	31	8	19	3	3	12	7	1	19
Slater Martin	St. Louis Hawks	31	4	11	0	0	2	3	1	8
George Yardley	Fort Wayne Pistons	25	4	10	1	1	9	0	2	9
Dick Garmaker	Minneapolis Lakers	18	5	10	0	0	7	1	2	10
Mel Hutchins	Fort Wayne Pistons	26	4	12	2	3	7	0	0	10
Vern Mikkelsen	Minneapolis Lakers	21	3	10	0	4	9	1	3	6
Richie Regan	Rochester Royals	21	2	7	0	0	4	1	0	4
Ed Macauley	St. Louis Hawks	19	3	6	1	2	5	3	0	7
Jack Twyman	Rochester Royals	17	1	8	1	3	0	1	1	3
Clyde Lovellette	Minneapolis Lakers	Did not play due to injury								
Totals		240	42	111	13	22	66	19	12	97

== NBA Old-Timers Game ==
The first NBA Old-Timers Game was held. Joe Lapchick, former coach of the New York Knicks, was named as a coach, while retired players Sonny Hertzberg and Connie Simmons also participated in the game. The Eastern Old Timers beat the Western Old Timers, 42–38.
