= 1962 NBA All-Star Game =

Exhibition basketball game

| | 1 | 2 | 3 | 4 | Total |
|---|---|---|---|---|---|
| East | 32 | 28 | 34 | 36 | 130 |
| West | 35 | 29 | 41 | 45 | 150 |
- Date: January 16, 1962
- Arena: St. Louis Arena
- City: St. Louis
- MVP: Bob Pettit
- Attendance: 15,112

NBA All-Star Game
| < 1961 | 1963 > |

The 12th Annual National Basketball Association All-Star Game was an exhibition basketball game that was played on Tuesday, January 16, 1962, at St. Louis Arena in St. Louis, Missouri, the home of the St. Louis Hawks. This was the second time the game was held in St. Louis, with the first being held in 1958.

The West won the game over the East, 150–130. The hometown Hawks' Bob Pettit was named the Most Valuable Player after logging 25 points and a game-high 27 rebounds.

== Coaches ==
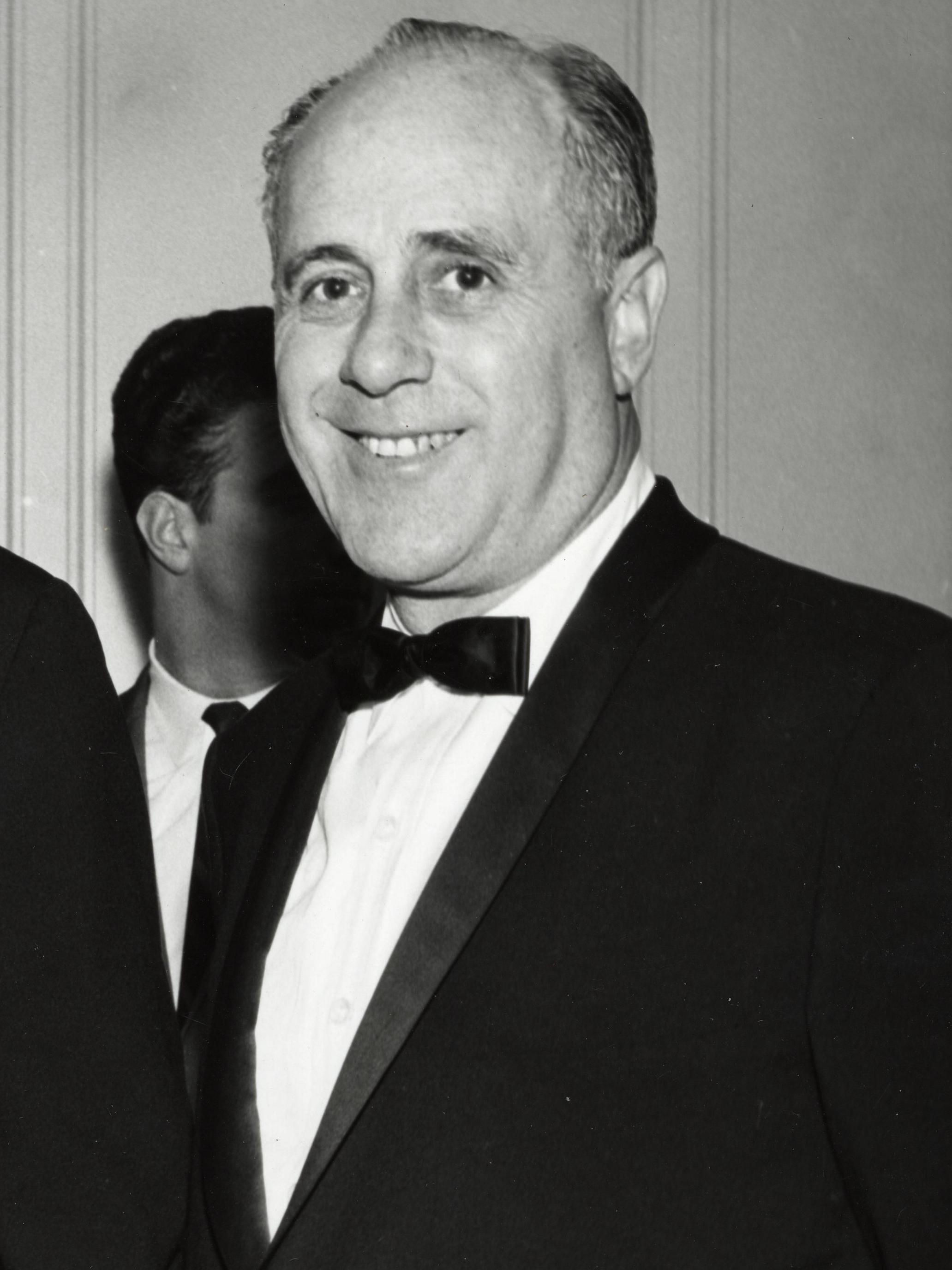
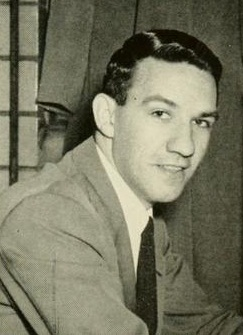
Red Auerbach and Fred Schaus were selected as the East and West head coach, respectively.

The coaches were the Celtics' Red Auerbach for the East and the Los Angeles Lakers' Fred Schaus for the West, as their respective teams led their respective divisions entering the game.

== Western Division ==
| Player, Team | MIN | FGM | FGA | FTM | FTA | REB | AST | PF | PTS |
| Elgin Baylor, LAL | 37 | 10 | 23 | 12 | 14 | 9 | 4 | 2 | 32 |
| Oscar Robertson, CIN | 37 | 9 | 20 | 8 | 14 | 7 | 13 | 3 | 26 |
| Bob Pettit, STL | 37 | 10 | 20 | 5 | 5 | 27 | 2 | 5 | 25 |
| Jerry West, LAL | 31 | 7 | 14 | 4 | 6 | 3 | 1 | 2 | 18 |
| Walt Bellamy, CHP | 29 | 10 | 18 | 3 | 8 | 17 | 1 | 6 | 23 |
| Gene Shue, DET | 17 | 3 | 6 | 1 | 1 | 5 | 4 | 3 | 7 |
| Wayne Embry, CIN | 16 | 2 | 6 | 0 | 0 | 4 | 1 | 4 | 4 |
| Frank Selvy, LAL | 11 | 0 | 3 | 0 | 0 | 4 | 1 | 1 | 0 |
| Cliff Hagan, STL | 9 | 1 | 3 | 0 | 0 | 2 | 1 | 1 | 2 |
| Jack Twyman, CIN | 8 | 4 | 6 | 3 | 3 | 1 | 2 | 0 | 11 |
| Bailey Howell, DET | 8 | 1 | 2 | 0 | 0 | 0 | 1 | 1 | 2 |
Rudy LaRusso, LAL (injured)
| Totals | 240 | 57 | 121 | 36 | 51 | 79 | 31 | 28 | 150 |

== Eastern Division ==
| Player, Team | MIN | FGM | FGA | FTM | FTA | REB | AST | PF | PTS |
| Wilt Chamberlain, PHW | 37 | 17 | 23 | 8 | 16 | 24 | 1 | 4 | 42 |
| Bob Cousy, BOS | 31 | 4 | 13 | 3 | 4 | 6 | 8 | 2 | 11 |
| Richie Guerin, NYK | 27 | 10 | 17 | 3 | 6 | 3 | 1 | 6 | 23 |
| Bill Russell, BOS | 27 | 5 | 12 | 2 | 3 | 12 | 2 | 2 | 12 |
| Hal Greer, SYR | 24 | 3 | 14 | 2 | 7 | 10 | 9 | 3 | 8 |
| Willie Naulls, NYK | 21 | 5 | 16 | 1 | 1 | 7 | 0 | 5 | 11 |
| Johnny Green, NYK | 21 | 2 | 4 | 3 | 3 | 2 | 0 | 1 | 7 |
| Paul Arizin, PHW | 21 | 2 | 12 | 0 | 0 | 2 | 0 | 4 | 4 |
| Sam Jones, BOS | 14 | 1 | 8 | 0 | 1 | 1 | 0 | 1 | 2 |
| Tom Heinsohn, BOS | 13 | 4 | 11 | 2 | 2 | 2 | 1 | 4 | 10 |
| Dolph Schayes, SYR | 4 | 0 | 0 | 0 | 0 | 1 | 0 | 3 | 0 |
Tom Gola, PHW (injured)
Larry Costello, SYR (injured)
| Totals | 240 | 53 | 130 | 24 | 43 | 70 | 22 | 35 | 130 |

== Score by periods ==
| Score by periods: | 1 | 2 | 3 | 4 | Final |
| West | 35 | 29 | 41 | 45 | 150 |
| East | 32 | 28 | 34 | 36 | 130 |

- Halftime— West, 64–60
- Third Quarter— West, 105–94
- Officials:
- Attendance: 15,112
