= Jack Madden =

American basketball referee

Jack Madden is an American retired professional basketball referee. He was born in Trenton, NJ.

Madden's career accomplishments included officiating in the 1970 NBA All-Star Game, 1975 ABA All-Star Game, 1978 NBA Finals, 1979 NBA All-Star Game, 1980 NBA Finals, 1981 NBA Finals, 1984 NBA Finals, 1986 NBA All-Star Game, 1989 NBA Finals, 1990 NBA Finals, 1991 NBA Finals and 1993 NBA All-Star Game, 1994 NBA Finals

Madden broke his leg officiating a 1985 game between the Boston Celtics and Philadelphia 76ers.
