= 1970 NBA All-Star Game =

Exhibition basketball game

	1	2	3	4	Total
West	21	38	26	50	135
East	36	35	35	36	142
- Date: January 20, 1970
- Arena: Spectrum
- City: Philadelphia
- MVP: Willis Reed
- Attendance: 15,244
- Network: ABC
- Announcers: Chris Schenkel; Jack Twyman

NBA All-Star Game
< 1969	1971 >

The 20th Annual National Basketball Association All-Star Game was an exhibition basketball game played on January 20, 1970, at the Spectrum in Philadelphia, home of the Philadelphia 76ers. The game was broadcast by ABC, with Chris Schenkel and Jack Twyman commentating.

This was the second time the NBA All-Star Game was played in Philadelphia and the first to be hosted by the 76ers in the city; the first All-Star game in the city was hosted in 1960 by the Philadelphia Warriors, who would later relocate to the San Francisco Bay Area in 1962. This was the second time the franchise hosted the game, having previously done so in Syracuse, New York, as the Nationals in 1961.

The Eastern All-Stars beat the Western All-Stars 142–135. Willis Reed of the New York Knicks was named the Most Valuable Player after scoring 21 points and grabbing 11 rebounds.

== Coaches ==
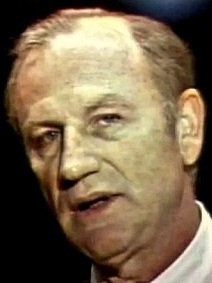
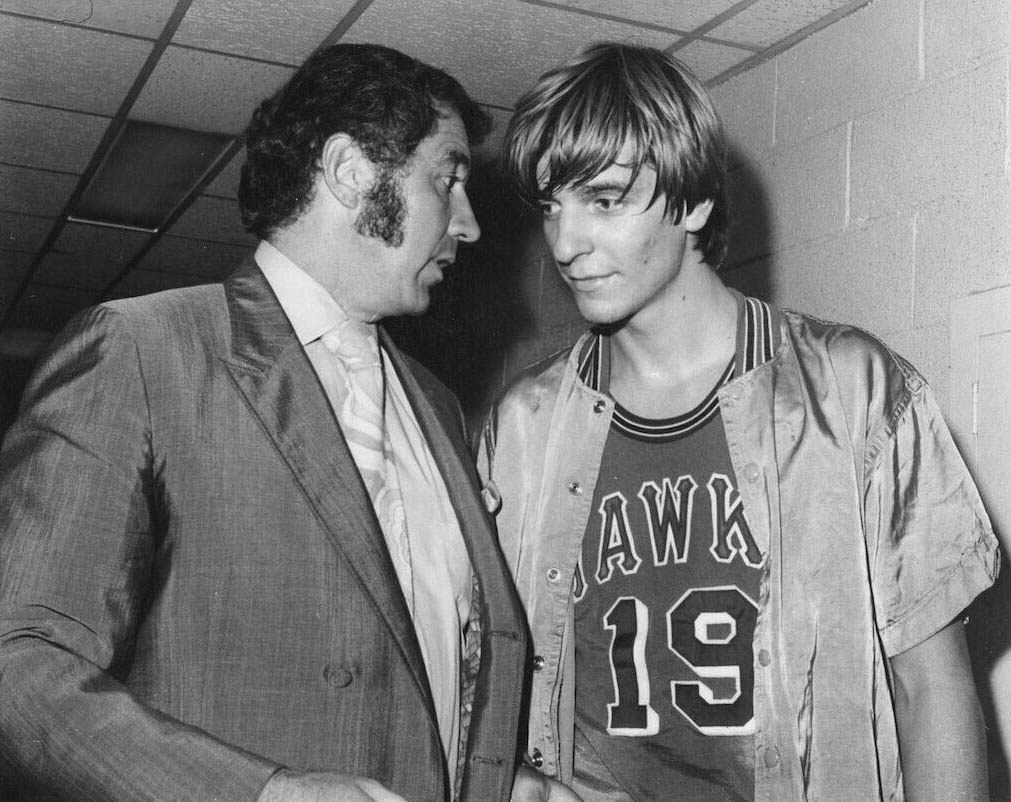
New York Knicks' Red Holzman (left) and Atlanta Hawks's Richie Guerin (right, pictured with Pete Maravich) were selected as head coach for the East and West, respectively

Red Holzman, head coach of the Eastern Division leader New York Knicks, qualified as the head coach of the Eastern All-Stars. Richie Guerin, head coach of the Western Division leader Atlanta Hawks, qualified as the head coach of the Western All-Stars.

== Team rosters ==
=== Eastern Division ===
Player, Team	MIN	FGM	FGA	FTM	FTA	REB	AST	PF	PTS
Willis Reed, NYK	30	9	18	3	3	11	0	6	21
Oscar Robertson, CIN	29	9	11	3	4	6	4	3	21
John Havlicek, BOS	29	7	15	3	3	5	7	2	17
Billy Cunningham, PHI	28	7	13	5	5	4	2	3	19
Walt Frazier, NYK	24	3	7	1	2	3	4	2	7
Hal Greer, PHI	21	7	11	1	1	4	3	4	15
Lew Alcindor, MIL	18	4	8	2	2	11	4	6	10
Gus Johnson, BAL	17	5	12	0	0	7	1	2	10
Dave DeBusschere, NYK	14	5	10	0	0	7	2	1	10
Jimmy Walker, DET	14	0	3	1	1	1	0	2	1
Flynn Robinson, MIL	8	3	4	0	0	1	2	2	6
Tom Van Arsdale, CIN	8	2	7	1	1	0	1	2	5
Totals	240	61	119	20	22	60	30	35	142

=== Western Division ===
Player, Team	MIN	FGM	FGA	FTM	FTA	REB	AST	PF	PTS
Elvin Hayes, SDR	35	9	21	6	12	15	1	1	24
Jerry West, LAL	31	7	12	8	12	5	5	3	22
Elgin Baylor, LAL	26	2	9	5	7	7	3	3	9
Joe Caldwell, ATL	19	5	11	3	4	7	1	2	13
Connie Hawkins, PHO	19	2	4	6	6	4	2	3	10
Lou Hudson, ATL	18	5	12	5	5	1	0	1	15
Lenny Wilkens, SEA	17	5	7	2	3	2	4	1	12
Chet Walker, CHI	17	1	3	2	2	2	1	2	4
Dick Van Arsdale, PHO	16	4	8	0	0	2	2	0	8
Bill Bridges, ATL	15	2	2	1	5	4	2	1	5
Jeff Mullins, SFW	14	4	6	0	0	1	1	2	8
Bob Rule, SEA	13	2	6	1	1	4	0	2	5
Nate Thurmond, SFW (injured)
Totals	240	48	101	39	57	54	22	21	135

Bob Rule of the Seattle SuperSonics was the replacement for the injured Nate Thurmond of the San Francisco Warriors.

== Score by periods ==
Score by periods:	1	2	3	4	Final
East	36	35	35	36	142
West	21	38	26	50	135

- Officials: Richie Powers and Jack Madden
- Attendance: 15,244.
