= 1975 NBA All-Star Game =

Exhibition basketball game

	1	2	3	4	Total
East	29	22	32	25	108
West	29	17	27	29	102
- Date: January 14, 1975
- Arena: Arizona Veterans Memorial Coliseum
- City: Phoenix
- MVP: Walt Frazier
- Attendance: 12,885
- Network: CBS
- Announcers: Brent Musburger and Oscar Robertson

NBA All-Star Game
< 1974	1976 >

The 25th Annual NBA All-Star Game was an exhibition basketball game that was played on January 14, 1975, at the Arizona Veterans Memorial Coliseum in Phoenix, Arizona, home of the Phoenix Suns. This was the first All-Star Game to be held in Phoenix. Bob McAdoo of the Buffalo Braves led the All-Star voting. The East won the game 108–102. The MVP of the game was Walt Frazier, who led all scorers with 30 points for the East.

== Coaches ==
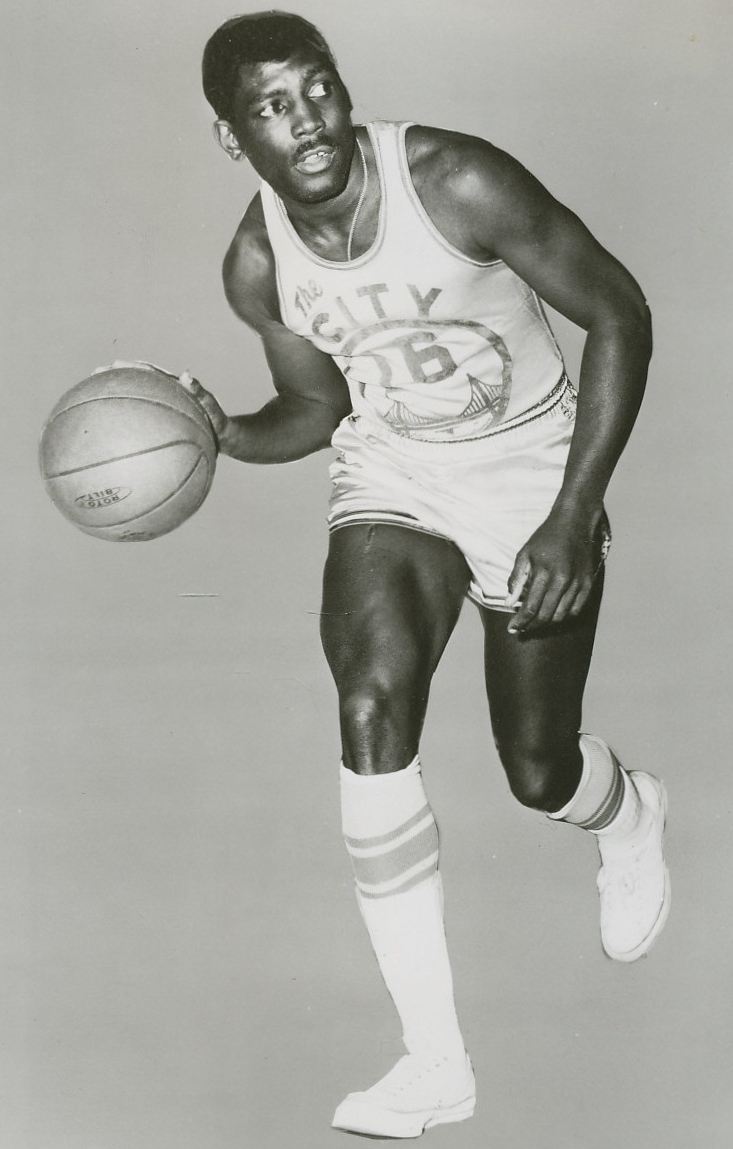
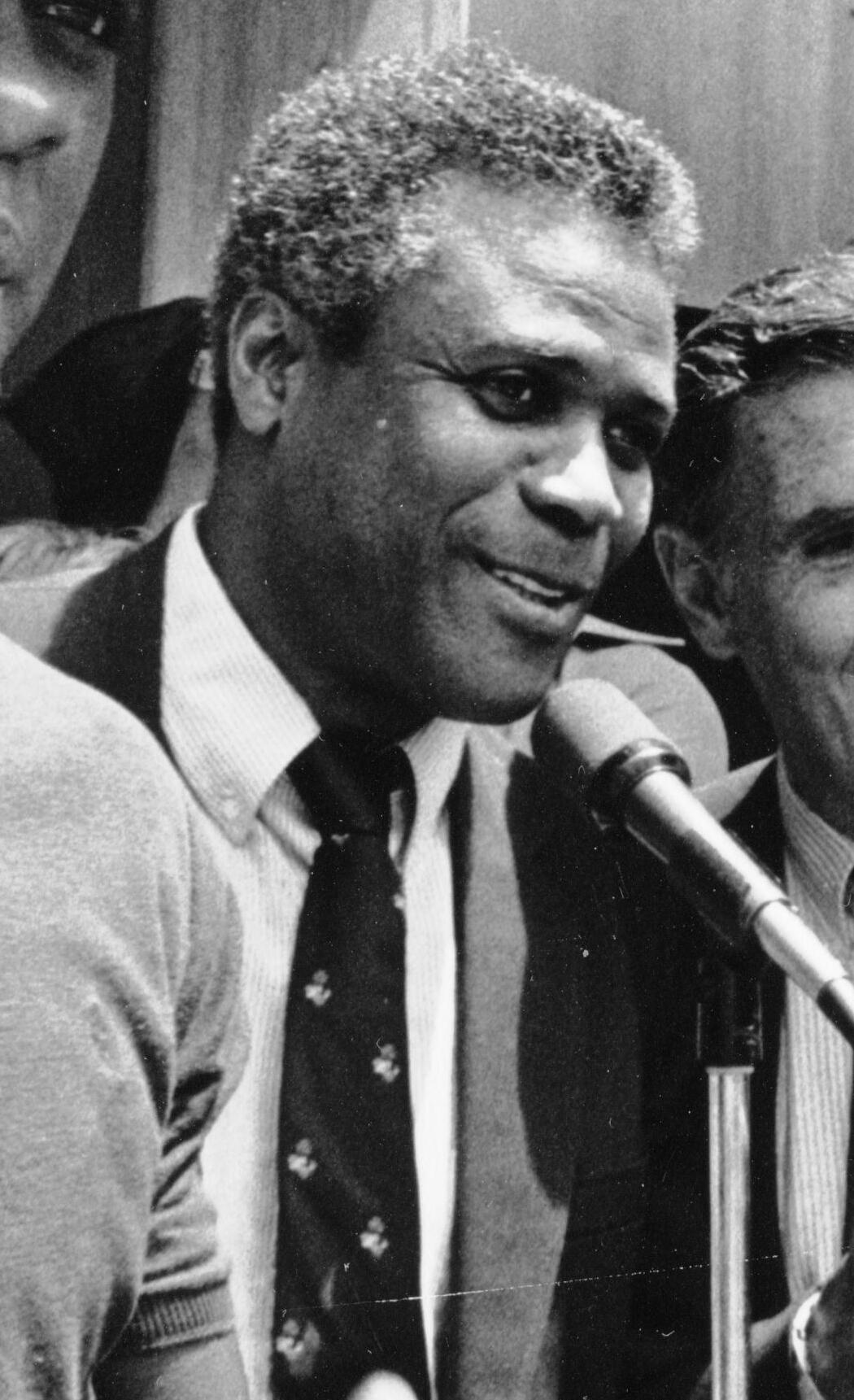
Al Attles and K.C. Jones were selected as the West and East head coach, respectively.

K.C. Jones, head coach of the Eastern Conference leader Washington Bullets, qualified as the head coach of the Eastern All-Stars. Al Attles, head coach of the Western Conference leader Golden State Warriors, qualified as the head coach of the Western All-Stars.

== Roster ==
=== Eastern Conference ===
Player, Team	MIN	FGM	FGA	FTM	FTA	ORB	DRB	REB	AST	STL	BLK	PFS	PTS
Walt Frazier, NY	35	10	17	10	11	0	5	5	2	4	0	2	30
John Havlicek, BOS	31	7	12	2	2	1	5	6	1	2	0	2	16
Bob McAdoo, BUF	26	4	9	3	3	4	2	6	2	0	0	4	11
Earl Monroe, NY	25	3	8	3	5	0	3	3	2	1	0	2	9
Phil Chenier, WAS	23	4	8	1	2	2	0	2	1	2	0	0	9
Elvin Hayes, WAS	17	2	6	0	0	0	5	5	2	1	0	1	4
Wes Unseld, WAS	15	2	3	2	2	2	4	6	1	2	0	2	6
Dave Cowens, BOS	15	3	7	0	0	0	6	6	3	1	0	4	6
Paul Silas, BOS	15	2	4	2	2	0	2	2	2	4	0	2	6
Rudy Tomjanovich, HOU	14	0	3	0	0	1	2	3	0	0	0	3	0
Jo Jo White, BOS	13	1	2	5	6	0	1	1	4	0	0	1	7
Steve Mix, PHI	11	2	5	0	0	0	2	2	0	0	0	2	4
Totals	240	40	84	28	33	10	37	47	20	17	0	25	108

=== Western Conference ===
Player, Team	MIN	FGM	FGA	FTM	FTA	ORB	DRB	REB	AST	STL	BLK	PFS	PTS
Rick Barry, GS	38	11	20	0	0	1	4	5	8	8	1	4	22
Nate Archibald, KCO	36	10	15	7	8	1	1	2	6	3	1	2	27
Sidney Wicks, POR	23	7	19	2	3	4	5	9	1	0	1	1	16
Kareem Abdul-Jabbar, MIL	19	3	10	1	2	5	5	10	3	0	1	2	7
Bob Dandridge, MIL	18	2	6	0	0	1	1	2	1	2	0	3	4
Jim Price, MIL	17	3	9	2	2	0	2	2	0	2	0	4	8
Sam Lacey, KCO	17	2	6	2	2	3	4	7	1	2	1	2	6
Spencer Haywood, SEA	17	1	9	0	0	1	2	3	0	0	0	1	2
Charlie Scott, PHO	16	1	6	0	0	1	1	2	1	0	0	3	2
Gail Goodrich, LA	15	2	4	0	0	0	1	1	4	0	0	1	4
Dave Bing, DET	12	0	2	2	2	0	0	0	1	0	0	0	2
Bob Lanier, DET	12	1	4	0	0	2	5	7	2	2	0	3	2
Totals	240	43	110	16	19	19	31	50	28	19	5	26	102

== Score by periods ==
Score by periods:	1	2	3	4	Final
East	29	22	32	25	108
West	29	17	27	29	102

- Halftime – East, 51–46
- Third Quarter – East, 83–73
- Officials: Mendy Rudolph and Jerry Loeber
- Attendance: 12,885
