= 1961 NBA All-Star Game =

Exhibition basketball game

	1	2	3	4	Total
West	47	37	31	38	153
East	19	43	35	34	131
- Date: January 17, 1961
- Arena: Onondaga County War Memorial Coliseum
- City: Syracuse
- MVP: Oscar Robertson
- Attendance: 8,016

NBA All-Star Game
< 1960	1962 >

The 11th Annual NBA All-Star Game was an exhibition basketball game played on January 17, 1961, at the Onondaga County War Memorial Coliseum in Syracuse, New York, home of the Syracuse Nationals. To date, this was the only NBA All-Star Game to be held in Syracuse, as the Nationals would relocate to Philadelphia and rebrand as the Philadelphia 76ers in 1963.

The coaches were the Boston Celtics' Red Auerbach for the East and the St. Louis Hawks' Paul Seymour for the West, as both teams had led their respective divisions prior to the game. The West won the game 153–131, becoming the highest-scoring All-Star game at that time, surpassing the record of 248 set in 1958. This record was held until 1984 wherein the All-Stars combined for 299 points. Oscar Robertson was named the Most Valuable Player after logging 23 points and 14 assists.

== Roster ==
Western All-Stars
Pos.	Player	Team	No. of selections
Starters
F	Elgin Baylor	Los Angeles Lakers	3rd
C	Clyde Lovellette	St. Louis Hawks	4th
F/C	Bob Pettit	St. Louis Hawks	7th
G	Oscar Robertson	Cincinnati Royals	1st
G	Gene Shue	Detroit Pistons	4th
Reserves
C	Walter Dukes	Detroit Pistons	2nd
C	Wayne Embry	Cincinnati Royals	1st
F	Cliff Hagan	St. Louis Hawks	4th
F	Bailey Howell	Detroit Pistons	1st
G	Hot Rod Hundley	Los Angeles Lakers	2nd
G	Jerry West	Los Angeles Lakers	1st
Head coach: Paul Seymour (St. Louis Hawks)

Eastern All-Stars
Pos.	Player	Team	No. of selections
Starters
C	Wilt Chamberlain	Philadelphia Warriors	2nd
G	Bob Cousy	Boston Celtics	11th
G	Richie Guerin	New York Knicks	4th
F	Tom Heinsohn	Boston Celtics	2nd
F/C	Dolph Schayes	Syracuse Nationals	11th
Reserves
F	Paul Arizin	Philadelphia Warriors	9th
G	Larry Costello	Syracuse Nationals	4th
G	Tom Gola	Philadelphia Warriors	2nd
G	Hal Greer	Syracuse Nationals	1st
F	Willie Naulls	New York Knicks	3rd
C	Bill Russell	Boston Celtics	4th
Head coach:Red Auerbach (Boston Celtics)

== Eastern Division ==
Player, Team	MIN	FGM	FGA	FTM	FTA	REB	AST	PF	PTS
Wilt Chamberlain, PHW	38	2	8	8	15	18	5	1	12
Bob Cousy, BOS	33	2	11	0	0	3	8	6	4
Bill Russell, BOS	28	9	15	6	8	11	1	2	24
Dolph Schayes, SYR	27	7	15	7	7	6	3	4	21
Tom Gola, PHW	25	6	13	2	4	5	3	2	14
Tom Heinsohn, BOS	19	2	16	0	0	6	1	4	4
Hal Greer, SYR	18	7	11	0	0	6	2	2	14
Paul Arizin, PHW	17	6	12	5	6	2	1	4	17
Willie Naulls, NYK	16	4	6	0	1	6	2	2	8
Richie Guerin, NYK	15	3	8	5	6	0	2	2	11
Larry Costello, SYR	5	1	2	0	0	0	0	2	2
Totals	240	49	117	33	47	63	28	31	131

== Western Division ==
Player, Team	MIN	FGM	FGA	FTM	FTA	REB	AST	PF	PTS
Oscar Robertson, CIN	34	8	13	7	9	9	14	5	23
Bob Pettit, STL	32	13	22	3	7	9	0	2	29
Clyde Lovellette, STL	31	10	19	1	1	10	3	4	21
Elgin Baylor, LAL	27	3	11	9	10	10	4	5	15
Jerry West, LAL	25	2	8	5	6	2	4	3	9
Gene Shue, DET	23	6	10	3	4	3	6	1	15
Walter Dukes, DET	17	3	6	2	2	4	1	4	8
Bailey Howell, DET	16	5	10	3	4	3	3	4	13
Hot Rod Hundley, LAL	14	6	10	2	2	0	2	1	14
Cliff Hagan, STL	13	0	2	2	2	2	0	1	2
Wayne Embry, CIN	8	2	4	0	0	3	0	0	4
Totals	240	58	115	37	47	55	37	30	153

== Score by periods ==
Score by periods:	1	2	3	4	Final
East	19	43	35	34	131
West	47	37	31	38	153

- Halftime— West, 84–62
- Third Quarter— West, 115–97
- Officials: Norm Drucker and Richie Powers
- Attendance: 8,016.
