= NBA All-Star Legends Game =

Former game of basketball

- Frequency: Annual
- Inaugurated: 1957
- Most recent: 1993
- Organizer: National Basketball Association

The NBA All-Star Legends Game (also called the Legends Classic) was an NBA Legends game from 1984 to 1993 that featured retired players. It was held during the NBA All-Star Weekend and consisted of two teams, East and West.

The NBA cancelled the NBA Legends Classic after 1994 due to the players' frequent injuries from the game in part due to the apparent wide range in fitness levels between players recently retired and those who had not played seriously in recent years (During the 1992 game, Norm Nixon and David Thompson both sustained significant injuries playing in the game).

The now-defunct Shooting Stars Competition and still-active Rising Stars Challenge are largely considered its replacements.

Previously, in 1957 and 1964, there were two NBA Old-Timers Games.

== All-Star Legends Game results ==
Year	Final score
1957	West 38, East 42
1964	West 46, East 50
1984	East 63, West 64
1985	East 63, West 53
1986	East 44, West 53
1987	East 43, West 54
1988	East 47, West 45 (OT)
1989	East 53, West 54
1990	East 37, West 36
1991	East 41, West 34
1992	East 38, West 46
1993	East 58, West 45
