= 1951 NBA All-Star Game =

Exhibition basketball game

	1	2	3	4	Total
East	31	22	30	28	111
West	22	20	22	30	94
- Date: Friday, March 2, 1951
- Arena: Boston Garden
- City: Boston
- MVP: Ed Macauley (East)
- Attendance: 10,094

NBA All-Star Game
	1952 >

The 1st Annual NBA All-Star Game was an exhibition basketball game played on March 2, 1951, at Boston Garden in Boston, home of the Boston Celtics. The game was the first edition of the National Basketball Association (NBA) All-Star Game and was played during the 1950–51 NBA season. The idea of holding an All-Star Game was conceived during a meeting between NBA President Maurice Podoloff, NBA publicity director Haskell Cohen and Boston Celtics owner Walter A. Brown. At that time, the basketball world had just been stunned by the college basketball point-shaving scandal. In order to regain public attention to the league, Cohen suggested the league to host an exhibition game featuring the league's best players, similar to the Major League Baseball's All-Star Game. Although most people, including Podoloff, were pessimistic about the idea, Brown remained confident that it would be a success. He even offered to host the game and to cover all the expenses or potential losses incurred from the game.

The Eastern All-Stars team defeated the Western All-Stars team 111–94. Boston Celtics' Ed Macauley was named as the first NBA All-Star Game Most Valuable Player. The game became a success, drawing an attendance of 10,094, much higher than that season's average attendance of 3,500.

== Roster ==
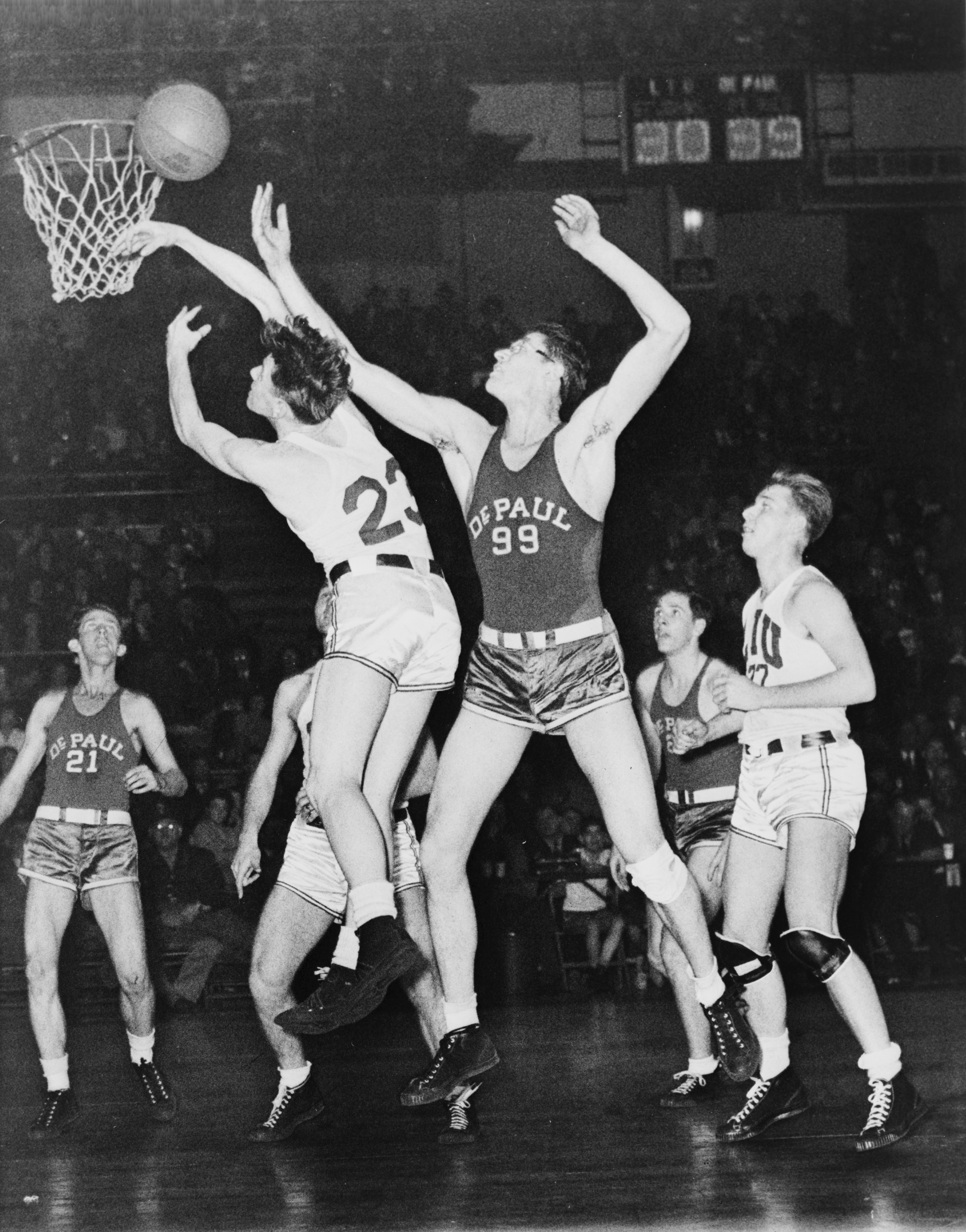
George Mikan (#99) was selected to the Western team.

The players for the All-Star Game were chosen by sports writers in several cities. They were not allowed to select players from their own cities. Players were selected without regard to position. On February 13, the team was announced by the NBA President Maurice Podoloff. Ten players from each Division were selected to represent the Eastern and Western Division in the All-Star Game. Vince Boryla, Ed Macauley, Dick McGuire and Dolph Schayes were unanimous selections to the Eastern team. Frank Brian, Ralph Beard, Bob Davies, Alex Groza, George Mikan, Vern Mikkelsen and Fred Schaus were unanimous selections to the Western team. Both the Philadelphia Warriors and the New York Knickerbockers were represented by three players each on the roster. The All-Star rosters included three rookies who were drafted in the 1950 draft: Paul Arizin, Bob Cousy and Larry Foust. Two players, Ken Murray and Arnie Risen, were named as alternates for the Eastern and Western team respectively. The alternates would be invited to the team if any of the twenty players selected failed to take part in the game. The starters were chosen by each team's head coach.

The coaches for the All-Star Game were the head coaches who coached the teams with the best winning percentage in their division through February 18, the Sunday two weeks before the All-Star game. The coach for the Western team was Minneapolis Lakers head coach John Kundla. As of February 18, the Lakers had 36–18 record, the best winning percentage in the Western Division and in the league. The coach for the Eastern team was New York Knickerbockers head coach Joe Lapchick. As of February 18, the Knickerbockers had 31–21 record, the best winning percentage in the Eastern Division and the second-best winning percentage in the league.

Eastern All-Stars
Pos.	Player	Team
Starters
G	Bob Cousy	Boston Celtics
F/C	Joe Fulks	Philadelphia Warriors
C/F	Ed Macauley	Boston Celtics
G/F	Andy Phillip	Philadelphia Warriors
F/C	Dolph Schayes	Syracuse Nationals
Reserves
F/G	Paul Arizin	Philadelphia Warriors
F	Vince Boryla	New York Knickerbockers
F/C	Harry Gallatin	New York Knickerbockers
G	Dick McGuire	New York Knickerbockers
C/F	Red Rocha	Baltimore Bullets
Alternate
G/F	Ken Murray	Fort Wayne Pistons^{[a]}
Head coach: Joe Lapchick (New York Knickerbockers)

Western All-Stars
Pos.	Player	Team
Starters
G	Ralph Beard	Indianapolis Olympians
G/F	Bob Davies	Rochester Royals
C	Alex Groza	Indianapolis Olympians
C	George Mikan	Minneapolis Lakers
F/C	Jim Pollard	Minneapolis Lakers
Reserves
G	Frank Brian	Tri-Cities Blackhawks
F/G	Dwight Eddleman	Tri-Cities Blackhawks
F/C	Larry Foust	Fort Wayne Pistons
F/C	Vern Mikkelsen	Minneapolis Lakers
F	Fred Schaus	Fort Wayne Pistons
Alternate
C/F	Arnie Risen	Rochester Royals
Head coach:John Kundla (Minneapolis Lakers)

Note

^{a} Ken Murray was a member of Eastern Division's Baltimore Bullets when the team was announced. He was sold to Western Division's Fort Wayne Pistons on February 15.

== Game ==
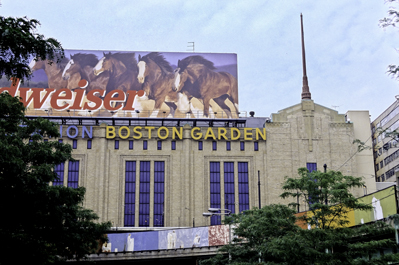
Boston Garden hosted the inaugural NBA All-Star Game.

The East defeated the West by 17 points. The West trailed by the end of the first quarter, where they were outscored by 9 points. The East's lead increased to 11 points at halftime and again to 19 points at the end of the third quarter. Boston Celtics' Ed Macauley scored a game-high 20 points and successfully defended Minneapolis Lakers star George Mikan, limiting him to only 4 field goals and 12 points. Alex Groza of the Indianapolis Olympians scored a team-high 17 points for the West. Syracuse Nationals' Dolph Schayes scored 15 points and also recorded a game-high 14 rebounds for the East while reserve Dick McGuire added a game-high 10 assists. Two other players from the East, Joe Fulks and reserve Paul Arizin, scored at least 19 and 15 points respectively as their team had 46.2 field goal percentage. On the other hand, the West only managed to make 32.7 percent of its shots. Macauley was named as the first All-Star Game Most Valuable Player. However, he was honored two years later during the 1953 All-Star Game, when the league decided to designate an MVP for each year's game.

=== Box score ===
March 2, 1951

Eastern All-Stars 111, Western All-Stars 94
Scoring by quarter: 31–22, 22–20, 30–22, 28–30
Pts: Ed Macauley 20; Rebs: Dolph Schayes 14; Asts: Dick McGuire 10	Pts: Alex Groza 17; Rebs: Alex Groza 13; Asts: Davies, Pollard 5 each

Boston Garden, Boston, Massachusetts
Attendance: 10,094
Referees:
- Pat Kennedy
- Charley Eckman

Legend
Pos	Position	Min	Minutes played	FGM	Field goals made	FGA	Field goal attempted	FTM	Free throws made
FTA	Free throw attempted	Reb	Rebounds	Ast	Assists	PF	Personal fouls	Pts	Points

Eastern All-Stars
Player	Pos	Min	FGM	FGA	FTM	FTA	Reb	Ast	PF	Pts
Starters
Bob Cousy	G	n/a	2	12	4	5	9	8	3	8
Andy Phillip	G/F	n/a	3	8	0	0	10	8	1	6
Joe Fulks	F/C	n/a	6	15	7	9	7	3	5	19
Dolph Schayes	F/C	n/a	7	10	1	2	14	3	1	15
Ed Macauley	C/F	n/a	7	12	6	7	6	1	3	20
Bench
Paul Arizin	F/G	n/a	7	12	1	2	7	0	2	15
Vince Boryla	F	n/a	4	6	1	1	2	2	3	9
Harry Gallatin	F/C	n/a	2	4	1	1	5	2	4	5
Dick McGuire	G	n/a	3	4	0	0	5	10	2	6
Red Rocha	C/F	n/a	2	10	4	4	2	3	2	8
Team totals		240	43	93	25	31	67	40	26	111

Western All-Stars
Player	Pos	Min	FGM	FGA	FTM	FTA	Reb	Ast	PF	Pts
Starters
Ralph Beard	G	n/a	3	8	0	3	3	2	1	6
Bob Davies	G/F	n/a	4	6	5	5	5	5	3	13
Jim Pollard	F/C	n/a	2	11	0	0	4	5	1	4
Alex Groza	C	n/a	8	16	1	1	13	1	4	17
George Mikan	C	n/a	4	17	4	6	11	3	2	12
Bench
Frank Brian	G	n/a	5	14	4	5	6	3	2	14
Dwight Eddleman	F/G	n/a	2	9	3	5	0	3	3	7
Larry Foust	C/F	n/a	1	6	0	0	5	2	3	2
Vern Mikkelsen	F/C	n/a	4	11	3	4	9	1	3	11
Fred Schaus	F	n/a	2	9	4	4	4	2	3	8
Team totals		240	35	107	24	33	60	27	25	94
