= 1973 NBA All-Star Game =

Exhibition basketball game

	1	2	3	4	Total
East	27	23	26	28	104
West	27	18	20	19	84
- Date: January 23, 1973
- Arena: Chicago Stadium
- City: Chicago
- MVP: Dave Cowens
- Attendance: 17,527
- Network: ABC
- Announcers: Chris Schenkel and Bill Russell

NBA All-Star Game
< 1972	1974 >

The 23rd NBA All-Star Basketball Game was an exhibition basketball game played on January 23, 1973, at the Chicago Stadium in Chicago, home of the Chicago Bulls. This was the first NBA All-Star Game to be held in Chicago.

The East All-Stars defeated the West All-Stars 104–84, with Dave Cowens of the Boston Celtics winning the Most Valuable Player award. Cowens scored 15 points, grabbed 15 rebounds, and dished 1 assist. This was the last All-Star Game in which a team scored fewer than 100 points.

== Coaches ==
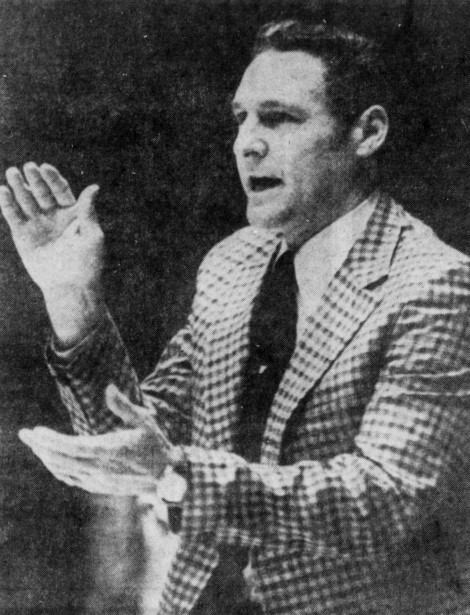
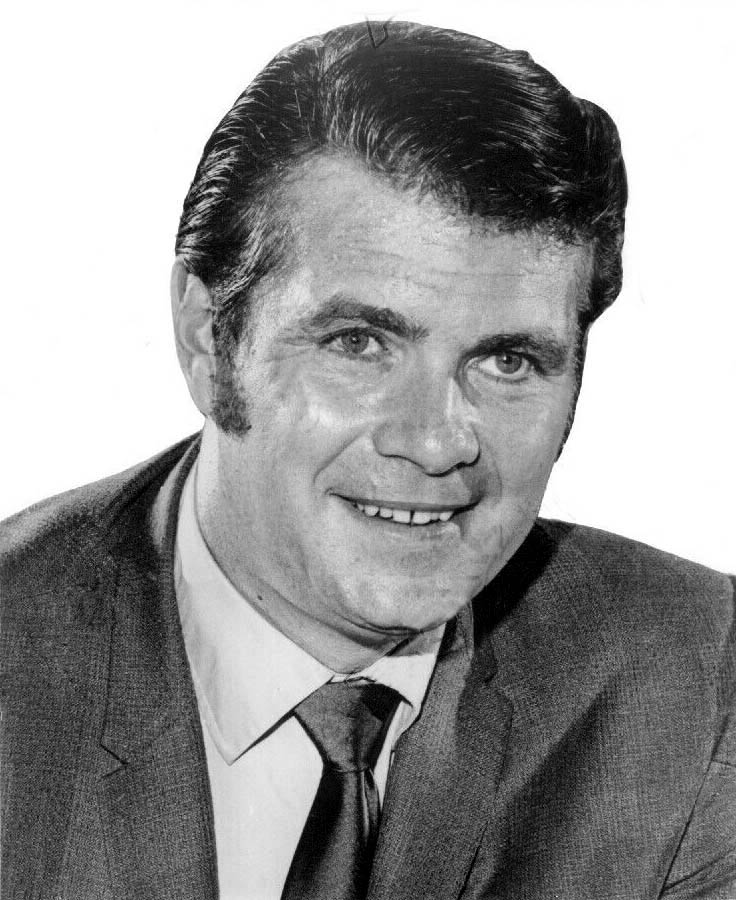
Bill Sharman and Tom Heinsohn were selected as the West and East head coach, respectively.

Bill Sharman, head coach of the Western Conference leader Los Angeles Lakers, was named as coach for the Western All-Stars. Tom Heinsohn, head coach of the Eastern Conference leader Boston Celtics, was named as coach for the Eastern All-Stars. This marks the second straight year that Sharman and Heinsohn have coached at the All-Star Game.

== Eastern Conference ==
Player, Team	MIN	FGM	FGA	FTM	FTA	REB	AST	PF	PTS
Dave Cowens, BOS	30	7	15	1	1	13	1	2	15
Walt Frazier, NYK	26	5	15	0	0	6	2	1	10
Dave DeBusschere, NYK	25	4	8	1	2	7	2	1	9
Lenny Wilkens, CLE	24	3	8	1	2	2	1	1	7
John Havlicek, BOS	22	6	10	2	5	3	5	1	14
Pete Maravich, ATL	22	4	8	0	0	3	5	4	8
Jo Jo White, BOS	18	3	7	0	0	5	5	0	6
Elvin Hayes, BAL	16	4	13	2	2	12	0	0	10
Bill Bradley, NYK	12	2	5	0	0	1	0	2	4
Wes Unseld, BAL	11	2	4	0	0	5	1	0	4
Jack Marin, HOU	11	2	6	0	0	4	1	0	4
Lou Hudson, ATL	9	2	8	2	2	2	0	2	6
Bob Kauffman, BUF	9	1	2	1	2	1	1	1	3
John Block, PHI	5	2	4	0	0	2	0	1	4
Totals	240	47	113	10	16	66	24	16	104

== Western Conference ==
Player, Team	MIN	FGM	FGA	FTM	FTA	REB	AST	PF	PTS
Nate Archibald, KCO	27	6	12	5	5	1	5	1	17
Sidney Wicks, POR	24	4	10	5	5	5	1	2	13
Spencer Haywood, SEA	22	5	10	2	2	10	0	5	12
Wilt Chamberlain, LAL	22	1	2	0	0	7	3	0	2
Jerry West, LAL	20	3	6	0	0	4	3	2	6
Dave Bing, DET	19	0	4	2	2	3	0	1	2
Chet Walker, CHI	16	1	5	2	2	1	0	2	4
Gail Goodrich, LAL	16	1	7	0	0	2	1	2	2
Nate Thurmond, GSW	14	2	5	0	0	4	1	2	4
Charlie Scott, PHO	14	0	5	0	0	2	2	1	0
Bob Lanier, DET	12	5	9	0	0	6	0	1	10
Bob Love, CHI	12	2	4	2	2	3	0	1	6
Bob Dandridge, MIL	11	2	4	0	0	3	0	0	4
Connie Hawkins, PHO	11	1	5	0	0	2	3	1	2
Kareem Abdul-Jabbar, MIL (DNP)
Rick Barry, GSW (injured)
Totals	240	33	88	18	18	53	19	21	84

== Score by periods ==
Score by periods:	1	2	3	4	Final
East	27	23	26	28	104
West	27	18	20	19	84

- Halftime— East, 50–45
- Third Quarter— East, 76–65
- Officials: Richie Powers and Jake O'Donnell
- Attendance: 17,527.
