= 1974 NBA All-Star Game =

Exhibition basketball game

	1	2	3	4	Total
West	39	27	35	33	134
East	29	18	38	38	123
- Date: January 15, 1974
- Arena: Seattle Center Coliseum
- City: Seattle
- MVP: Bob Lanier
- Attendance: 14,360
- Network: CBS
- Announcers: Pat Summerall, Rod Hundley and Elgin Baylor

NBA All-Star Game
< 1973	1975 >

The 24th Annual NBA All Star Game was an exhibition basketball game that was played on January 15, 1974, at the Seattle Center Coliseum in Seattle, the home of the Seattle SuperSonics. It was played during the 1973–74 NBA season. It was the first NBA All-Star Game held in Seattle.

The Western All-Stars won the game 134–123. The MVP of the game was Bob Lanier, who scored 24 points.

== Coaches ==
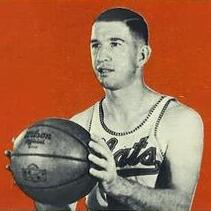
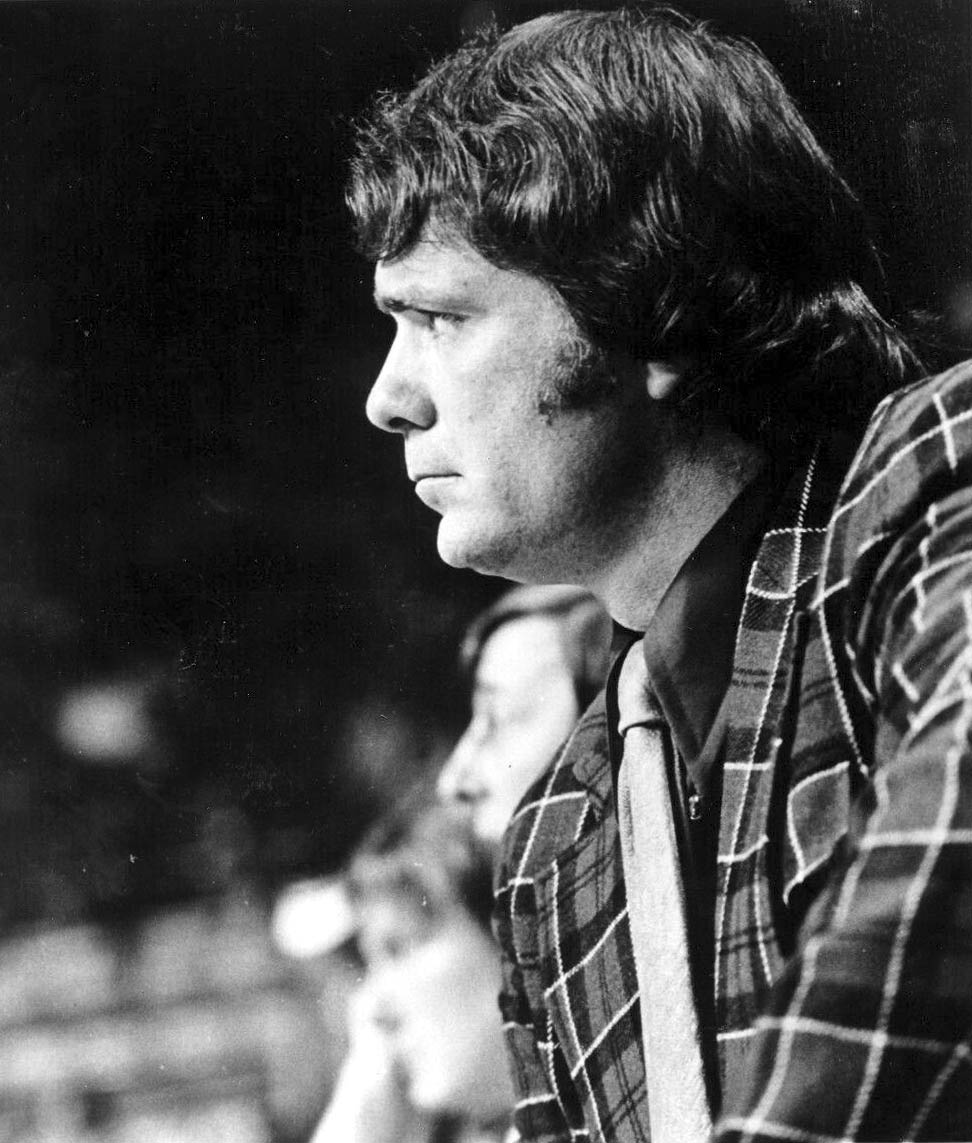
Larry Costello and Tom Heinsohn were selected as the West and East head coach, respectively.

Tom Heinsohn, head coach of the Eastern Conference leader Boston Celtics, qualified as the head coach of the Eastern All-Stars. Larry Costello, head coach of the Western Conference leader Milwaukee Bucks, qualified as the head coach of the Western All-Stars.

== Roster ==
=== Eastern Conference ===
Player, Team	MIN	FGM	FGA	FTM	FTA	ORB	DRB	REB	AST	STL	BLK	PFS	PTS
Elvin Hayes, CAP	35	5	13	2	3	4	11	15	6	0	1	4	12
Walt Frazier, NYK	28	5	12	2	2	1	1	2	5	3	0	1	12
Dave Cowens, BOS	26	5	10	1	3	6	6	12	1	0	1	3	11
Dave DeBusschere, NYK	24	8	14	0	0	2	1	3	3	1	0	2	16
Pete Maravich, ATL	22	4	15	7	9	1	2	3	4	0	0	2	15
Jo Jo White, BOS	22	6	12	1	3	2	4	6	4	2	1	1	13
John Havlicek, BOS	18	5	10	0	2	0	0	0	2	1	0	2	10
Lou Hudson, ATL	17	5	8	2	2	1	2	3	1	0	1	2	12
Rudy Tomjanovich, HOU	17	2	5	0	0	2	3	5	0	0	0	1	4
Bob McAdoo, BUF	13	3	4	5	8	1	2	3	1	0	1	4	11
Phil Chenier, CAP	13	3	6	1	2	1	1	2	1	0	0	0	7
Austin Carr, CLE	5	0	4	0	0	0	1	1	0	0	0	1	0
Totals	240	51	113	21	34	21	34	55	28	7	5	23	123

=== Western Conference ===
Player, Team	MIN	FGM	FGA	FTM	FTA	ORB	DRB	REB	AST	STL	BLK	PFS	PTS
Spencer Haywood, SEA	33	10	17	3	3	2	9	11	5	0	3	5	23
Bob Lanier, DET	26	11	15	2	2	2	8	10	2	0	2	1	24
Gail Goodrich, LAL	26	9	16	0	0	1	3	4	6	1	0	2	18
Geoff Petrie, POR	26	3	11	2	2	1	1	2	4	1	0	1	8
Sidney Wicks, POR	24	5	6	6	10	1	0	1	1	2	0	4	16
Kareem Abdul-Jabbar, MIL	23	7	11	0	0	1	7	8	6	1	1	2	14
Rick Barry, GSW	19	3	6	2	2	1	3	4	3	1	0	3	8
Charlie Scott, PHO	19	0	4	2	2	0	1	1	4	0	1	2	2
Dave Bing, DET	16	2	9	1	1	1	5	6	2	0	0	1	5
Chet Walker, CHI	14	4	5	4	4	0	2	2	1	0	0	1	12
Norm Van Lier, CHI	9	0	0	0	0	1	0	1	2	1	0	1	0
Nate Thurmond, GSW	5	2	4	0	1	1	2	3	0	0	0	0	4
Jerry West, LAL (injured)
Totals	240	56	104	22	27	12	41	53	36	7	7	23	134

== Score by periods ==
Score by periods:	1	2	3	4	Final
East	29	18	38	38	123
West	39	27	35	33	134

- Halftime— West, 66–47
- Third Quarter— West, 101–85
- Officials: Don Murphy and Bob Rakel
- Attendance: 14,360.
