= 1979 NBA All-Star Game =

Exhibition basketball game

	1	2	3	4	Total
West	36	44	24	30	134
East	27	31	40	31	129
- Date: February 4, 1979
- Arena: Pontiac Silverdome
- City: Pontiac
- MVP: David Thompson
- Attendance: 31,745
- Network: CBS
- Announcers: Brent Musburger, Steve Jones and John Havlicek

NBA All-Star Game
< 1978	1980 >

The 1979 NBA All-Star Game was an exhibition basketball game which was played on February 4, 1979, at the Pontiac Silverdome in the Detroit suburb of Pontiac, Michigan, the home of the Detroit Pistons. It was the 29th edition of the National Basketball Association (NBA) All-Star Game, held during the 1978–79 NBA season.

This was the first All-Star Game where no members from Boston Celtics or New York Knicks had been selected as All-Stars.

In addition, this was the first All-Star game held in a football or baseball dome as opposed to a traditional basketball arena; the Detroit Pistons were playing at the Pontiac Silverdome at that time. This was the third All-Star hosted by the Pistons franchise, after doing so in 1953 in Fort Wayne, Indiana, and in 1959 in Detroit.

The Western All-Stars defeated the Eastern All-Stars, 134–129. The MVP of the game was David Thompson, who scored 25 points. The game was officiated by John Vanak, Jack Madden, and Hugh Evans.

== Coaches ==
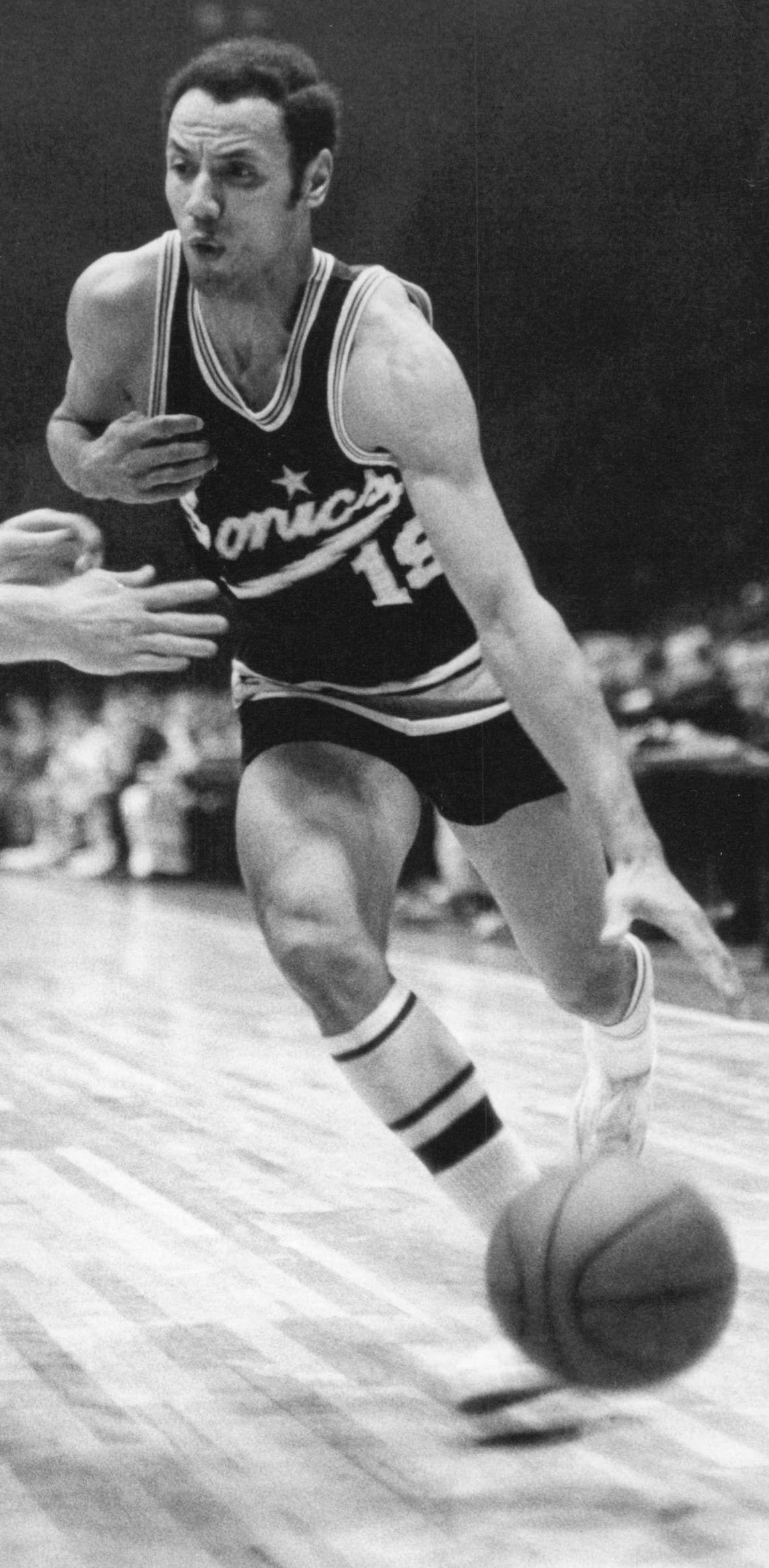
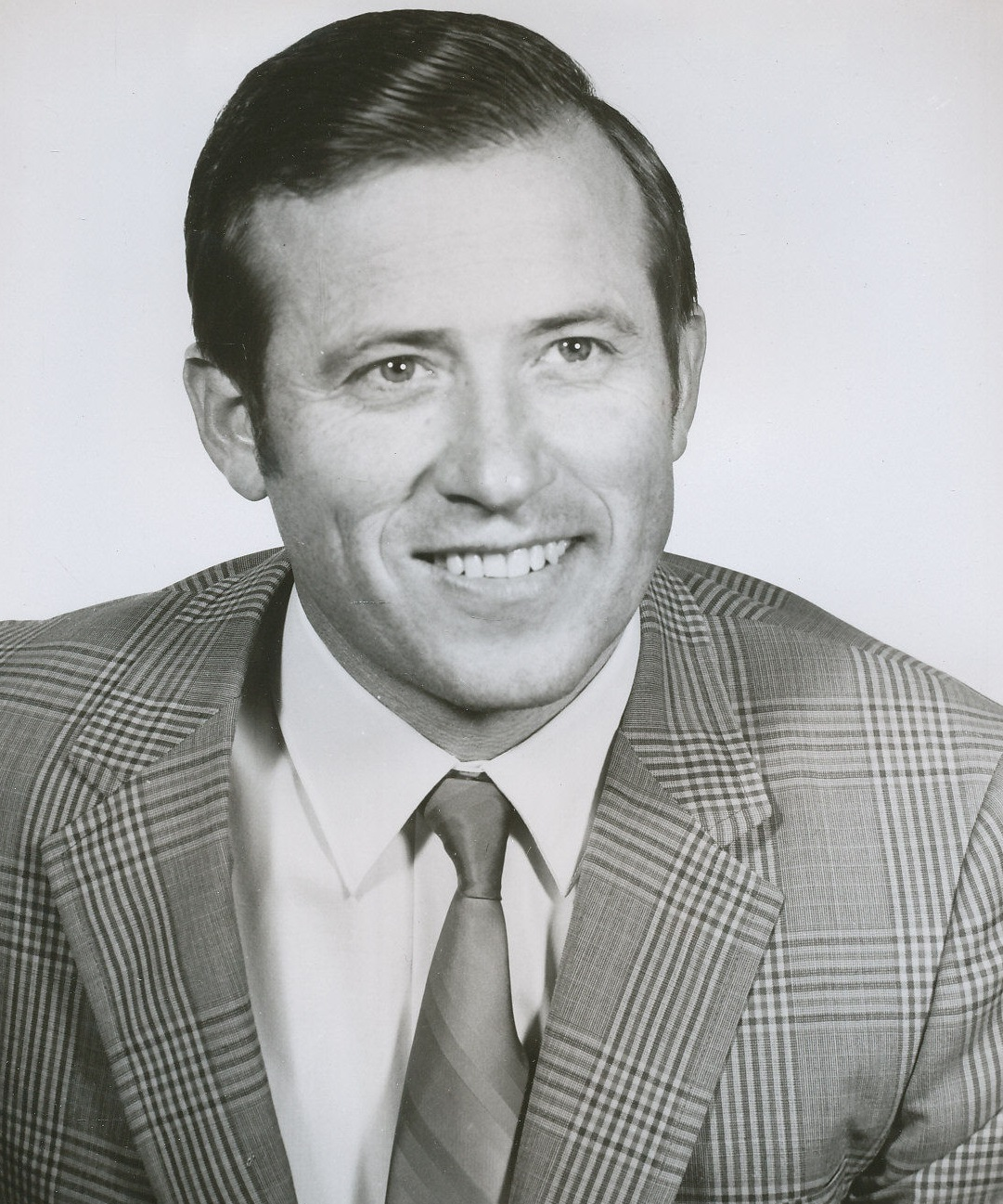
Lenny Wilkens and Dick Motta were selected as the West and East head coach, respectively.

Dick Motta, head coach of the Eastern Conference leader Washington Bullets, qualified as the head coach of the Eastern All-Stars. Lenny Wilkens, head coach of the Western Conference leader Seattle SuperSonics, qualified as the head coach of the Western All-Stars.

== Roster ==
=== Western Conference ===
Player, Team	MIN	FGM	FGA	FTM	FTA	REB	AST	BLK	PFS	PTS
David Thompson, DEN	34	11	17	3	7	5	2	1	4	25
Kareem Abdul-Jabbar, LAL	28	5	12	1	2	8	3	1	4	11
Dennis Johnson, SEA	27	5	7	2	2	1	3	1	3	12
George McGinnis, DEN	25	5	12	6	11	6	3	0	4	16
Paul Westphal, PHO	21	8	12	1	2	1	5	0	0	17
Marques Johnson, MIL	20	3	11	4	6	6	2	0	1	10
Maurice Lucas, POR	19	4	10	2	2	7	1	0	5	10
Walter Davis, PHO	19	4	9	0	0	4	4	0	0	8
Jack Sikma, SEA	18	4	5	0	0	4	0	0	1	8
Artis Gilmore, CHI	15	3	4	2	2	1	2	0	1	8
Otis Birdsong, KCK	14	4	6	1	2	2	0	0	1	9
Totals	240	56	105	22	36	45	25	3	24	134

=== Eastern Conference ===
Player, Team	MIN	FGM	FGA	FTM	FTA	REB	AST	BLK	PFS	PTS
Julius Erving, PHI	39	10	22	9	12	8	5	0	4	29
George Gervin, SAS	34	8	16	10	11	6	2	1	4	26
Bob Lanier, DET	31	5	10	0	0	4	4	1	4	10
Elvin Hayes, WSB	28	5	11	3	5	13	0	1	5	13
Rudy Tomjanovich, HOU	24	6	13	0	0	6	1	0	2	12
Bob Dandridge, WSB	18	3	5	2	3	3	1	0	2	8
Moses Malone, HOU	17	2	2	4	5	7	1	0	0	8
Calvin Murphy, HOU	15	3	5	0	0	1	5	0	4	6
Pete Maravich, NOJ	14	5	8	0	0	2	2	0	1	10
Campy Russell, CLE	13	2	8	0	0	1	0	0	0	4
Larry Kenon, SAS	7	1	3	1	2	2	1	0	0	3
Doug Collins, PHI (injured)
Totals	240	50	103	29	38	53	22	3	26	129

== Score by periods ==
Score by periods:	1	2	3	4	Final
West	36	44	24	30	134
East	27	31	40	31	129
