= 1982 NBA All-Star Game =

Exhibition basketball game

	1	2	3	4	Total
West	39	22	28	29	118
East	34	29	27	30	120
- Date: January 31, 1982
- Arena: Brendan Byrne Arena
- City: East Rutherford
- MVP: Larry Bird
- Attendance: 20,149
- Network: CBS
- Announcers: Dick Stockton and Bill Russell

NBA All-Star Game
< 1981	1983 >

The 1982 NBA All-Star Game was an exhibition basketball game that was played on January 31, 1982, at Brendan Byrne Arena in East Rutherford, New Jersey, home of the New Jersey Nets. This was the 32nd edition of the National Basketball Association All-Star Game and was played during the 1981–82 NBA season. This was the first and, to date, only All-Star Game to be held in New Jersey, as well as the only full All-Star Game the Nets have ever hosted, as the team would later relocate to Brooklyn, New York City, in 2012 and hosted only the 2015 NBA All-Star Friday and Saturday events there.

The head coaches were Bill Fitch of the Boston Celtics for the East and Pat Riley of the Los Angeles Lakers for the West, as both the Celtics and Lakers led their respective conferences at the end of January. The East won the game, 120–118. Larry Bird was named the game's MVP for his 4th quarter heroics during crunch time.

== Western Conference ==
Player, Team	MIN	FGM	FGA	3PM	3PA	FTM	FTA	REB	AST	BLK	PFS	PTS
George Gervin, SAS	27	5	14	0	0	2	2	6	1	3	3	12
Gus Williams, SEA	26	9	19	0	1	4	4	2	9	0	1	22
Magic Johnson, LAL	23	5	9	0	0	6	7	4	7	0	5	16
Kareem Abdul-Jabbar, LAL	22	1	10	0	0	0	0	3	1	2	3	2
Adrian Dantley, UTA	21	6	8	0	0	0	1	2	0	0	2	12
Jack Sikma, SEA	21	5	11	0	0	0	0	9	1	1	2	10
Moses Malone, HOU	20	5	11	0	0	2	6	11	0	1	2	12
Lonnie Shelton, SEA	20	3	3	0	0	1	2	9	1	0	4	7
Norm Nixon, LAL	19	7	14	0	0	0	0	0	2	0	0	14
Dennis Johnson, PHO	15	0	2	0	0	1	2	5	1	2	1	1
Bernard King, GSW	14	2	7	0	0	2	2	4	1	1	2	6
Alex English, DEN	12	2	6	0	0	0	0	5	1	0	2	4
Totals	240	50	114	0	1	18	26	60	25	10	27	118

== Eastern Conference ==
Player, Team	MIN	FGM	FGA	3PM	3PA	FTM	FTA	REB	AST	BLK	PFS	PTS
Julius Erving, PHI	32	7	16	0	0	2	4	8	2	2	4	16
Larry Bird, BOS	28	7	12	0	0	5	8	12	5	1	3	19
Nate Archibald, BOS	23	2	5	0	0	2	2	2	7	0	3	6
Sidney Moncrief, MIL	22	3	11	0	0	0	2	4	1	0	2	6
Buck Williams, NJN	22	2	7	0	0	0	2	10	1	2	0	4
Robert Parish, BOS	20	9	12	0	0	3	4	7	1	2	2	21
Micheal Ray Richardson, NYK	20	5	10	0	0	0	0	2	4	0	1	10
Isiah Thomas, DET	17	5	7	0	0	2	4	1	4	0	1	12
Artis Gilmore, CHI	16	3	6	0	0	1	1	3	2	1	4	7
Kelly Tripucka, DET	15	3	7	0	0	0	0	1	2	0	3	6
Bobby Jones, PHI	14	2	5	0	0	1	2	4	1	0	2	5
Bob Lanier, MIL	11	3	7	0	0	2	2	3	0	1	3	8
Dan Roundfield, ATL (injured)
Totals	240	51	105	0	0	18	31	57	30	9	28	120

== Score by periods ==
Score by periods:	1	2	3	4	Final
West	39	22	28	29	118
East	34	29	27	30	120

- Halftime— East, 63–61
- Third Quarter— East, 90–89
- Attendance: 20,149.
