= 1981 NBA All-Star Game =

Exhibition basketball game

	1	2	3	4	Total
East	23	39	36	26	123
West	27	31	30	32	120
- Date: February 1, 1981
- Arena: Richfield Coliseum
- City: Richfield
- MVP: Nate Archibald
- Attendance: 20,239
- Network: CBS
- Announcers: Gary Bender (Play by Play); Bill Russell and Rick Barry (Color); Hot Rod Hundley (Sideline)

NBA All-Star Game
< 1980	1982 >

The 1981 NBA All-Star Game was an exhibition basketball game which was played February 1, 1981, at the Richfield Coliseum in Richfield, Ohio, home of the Cleveland Cavaliers. This was the 31st edition of the National Basketball Association All-Star Game and was played during the 1980–81 NBA season. This was the first All-Star game to be held in the state of Ohio since 1966 when it was held in Cincinnati, the first one hosted by the Cavaliers, and the only one to be held at Richfield, as the franchise would move to the Gund Arena (now Rocket Arena) in Cleveland in 1994 and host the game there twice more.

The Eastern All-Stars won the game 123–120. Nate Archibald of the Boston Celtics was named the All-Star Game Most Valuable Player (MVP) after dishing a game-high 9 assists.

== Coaches ==
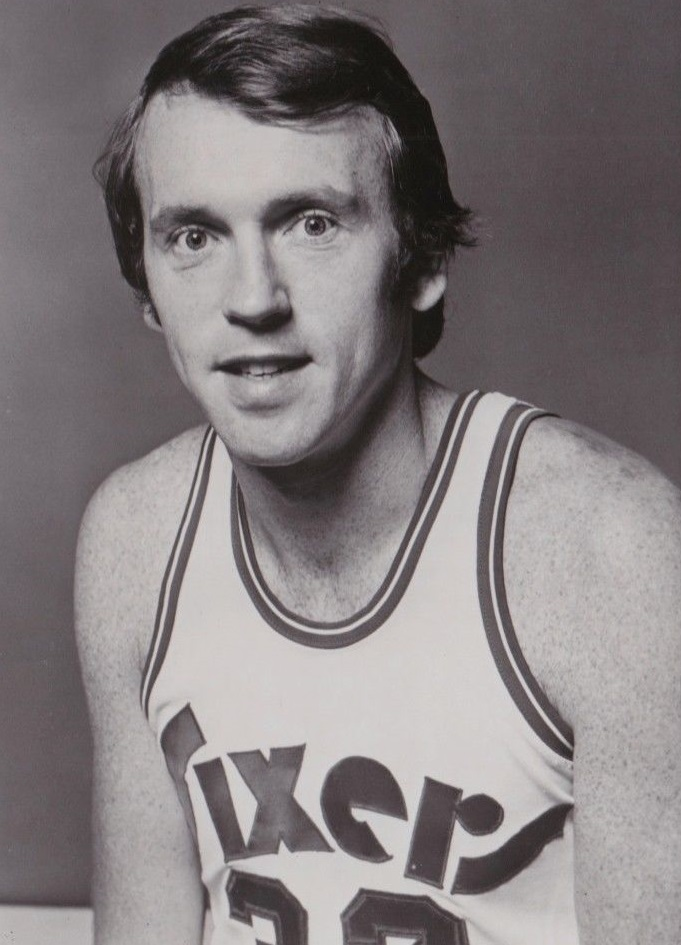
John MacLeod (not pictured) and Billy Cunningham were selected as the West and East head coach, respectively.

Billy Cunningham, head coach of the Eastern Conference leader Philadelphia 76ers, qualified as the head coach of the Eastern All-Stars. John MacLeod, head coach of the Western Conference leader Phoenix Suns, qualified as the head coach of the Western All-Stars.

== Team rosters ==
=== Western Conference ===
Player, Team	MIN	FGM	FGA	FTM	FTA	REB	AST	PTS
Walter Davis, PHO	22	5	9	2	2	7	1	12
Adrian Dantley, UTA	21	3	9	2	2	5	0	8
Kareem Abdul-Jabbar, LA	23	6	12	3	3	4	3	15
Paul Westphal, SEA	25	8	12	3	3	4	3	19
George Gervin, SA	24	5	9	1	2	3	0	11
Jamaal Wilkes, LA	25	6	12	3	3	8	3	15
Moses Malone, HOU	22	3	8	2	4	6	3	8
Truck Robinson, PHO	21	3	6	0	0	5	2	6
Jack Sikma, SEA	21	2	5	2	2	4	4	6
Dennis Johnson, PHO	24	5	8	9	10	2	1	19
Otis Birdsong, KC	12	0	3	1	2	1	1	1
Totals	240	46	90	28	33	51	22	120

=== Eastern Conference ===
Player, Team	MIN	FGM	FGA	FTM	FTA	REB	AST	PTS
Larry Bird, BOS	18	1	5	0	0	4	3	2
Julius Erving, PHI	29	6	15	6	7	3	2	18
Artis Gilmore, CHI	19	5	7	1	2	6	2	11
Eddie Johnson, ATL	28	7	12	2	3	2	2	16
Reggie Theus, CHI	19	4	7	0	0	1	3	8
Nate Archibald, BOS	25	4	7	1	3	5	9	9
Robert Parish, BOS	25	5	18	6	6	10	2	16
Bobby Jones, PHI	16	5	11	1	1	4	0	11
Marques Johnson, MIL	19	1	2	5	6	4	2	7
Micheal Ray Richardson, NY	24	5	7	1	2	5	3	11
Mike Mitchell, CLE	15	6	12	2	2	4	2	14
Dan Roundfield, ATL (injured)
Totals	240	49	103	25	32	48	30	123

Injury replacements

- Cleveland forward Mike Mitchell replaced Atlanta forward Dan Roundfield due to the latter's right calf injury

== Score by periods ==
Score by periods:	1	2	3	4	Final
Western Conference	27	31	30	32	120
Eastern Conference	23	38	36	26	123

- Halftime— East, 61–58
- Third Quarter— East, 97–88
- Officials: Paul Mihalak and Darell Garretson.
- Attendance: 20,239.
