= 1953 NBA All-Star Game =

Exhibition basketball game

	1	2	3	4	Total
East	20	14	21	20	75
West	20	15	22	22	79
- Date: January 13, 1953
- Arena: Allen County War Memorial Coliseum
- City: Fort Wayne
- MVP: George Mikan
- Attendance: 10,322

NBA All-Star Game
< 1952	1954 >

The 3rd Annual NBA All-Star Game was an exhibition basketball game played on January 13, 1953, at Allen County War Memorial Coliseum in Fort Wayne, Indiana, home of the Fort Wayne Pistons. The game was the third edition of the National Basketball Association (NBA) All-Star Game and was played during the 1952–53 NBA season. This was the only All-Star game held at Fort Wayne, as the Pistons would relocate to Detroit in 1957. It was also the first to be hosted in the state of Indiana; subsequent games were hosted in Indianapolis by the Indiana Pacers after they joined the NBA in 1976.

The Western All-Stars team defeated the Eastern All-Stars team 79–75; this was the lowest scoring NBA All-Star game ever as both teams combined for 154 points. This was the West's first ever win over the East. Minneapolis Lakers' George Mikan, who led the West with game-highs 22 points and 16 rebounds, was named as the All-Star Game Most Valuable Player.

== Background ==
Allen County War Memorial Coliseum in Fort Wayne, Indiana, was selected as the host venue for the third annual NBA All-Star Game following its opening in September 1952. Although Fort Wayne was the smallest market in the NBA at the time, Fort Wayne Pistons owner Fred Zollner paid the league approximately US$18,000 (equivalent to $218,233 in 2025) to secure the event and to showcase the new arena.

== Coaches ==
Minneapolis Lakers head coach John Kundla returned to coach the Western All-Stars for the third straight year. New York Knickerbockers head coach Joe Lapchick was named as the Eastern All-Stars head coach for the second time. Both the Lakers and Knickerbockers had led their respective divisions entering the month of January. Although New York was later overtaken by the Boston Celtics, reclaimed the lead, and was overtaken this time by the Syracuse Nationals less than a week before the game, these changes occurred after the cut-off date and did not affect Lapchick's selection.

== Roster ==
The players for the All-Star Game were chosen by sports writers in several cities. They were not allowed to select players from their own cities. Players were selected without regard to position. Ten players from each Division were selected to represent the Eastern and Western Division in the All-Star Game. However, Fred Scolari suffered an injury and was unable to participate in the game; one other player was added to the roster. Eight players from the previous year's Western All-Stars roster returned, while only five players from the previous year's Eastern All-Stars roster returned. Eight players, Don Barksdale, Carl Braun, Billy Gabor, Mel Hutchins, Neil Johnston, Slater Martin, Paul Seymour and Bill Sharman, were selected for the first time. Barksdale, one of the first African American players in the NBA, became the first African American to play in an All-Star Game. The Boston Celtics were represented by four players in the roster while three other teams, the Minneapolis Lakers, the New York Knickerbockers, and the Rochester Royals, were represented by three players each on the roster. The starters were chosen by each team's head coach.

Eastern All-Stars
Pos.	Player	Team	No. of selections
Starters
G	Bob Cousy	Boston Celtics	3rd
F/C	Harry Gallatin	New York Knickerbockers	3rd
C/F	Ed Macauley	Boston Celtics	3rd
F/C	Dolph Schayes	Syracuse Nationals	3rd
G	Bill Sharman	Boston Celtics	1st
Reserves
F/C	Don Barksdale	Baltimore Bullets	1st
G/F	Carl Braun	New York Knickerbockers	1st
G/F	Billy Gabor	Syracuse Nationals	1st
C	Neil Johnston	Philadelphia Warriors	1st
G	Fred Scolari	Baltimore Bullets	2nd
G/F	Paul Seymour	Syracuse Nationals	1st
Head coach: Joe Lapchick (New York Knicks)

Western All-Stars
Pos.	Player	Team	No. of selections
Starters
F/C	Mel Hutchins	Milwaukee Hawks	1st
C	George Mikan	Minneapolis Lakers	3rd
F/C	Vern Mikkelsen	Minneapolis Lakers	3rd
G/F	Andy Phillip	Fort Wayne Pistons	3rd
G	Bobby Wanzer	Rochester Royals	2nd
Reserves
F/G	Leo Barnhorst	Indianapolis Olympians	2nd
G/F	Bob Davies	Rochester Royals	3rd
C/F	Larry Foust	Fort Wayne Pistons	3rd
G	Slater Martin	Minneapolis Lakers	1st
C/F	Arnie Risen	Rochester Royals	2nd
Head coach:John Kundla (Minneapolis Lakers)

== Game ==
The West defeated the East by 4 points. The game was a tight contest with plenty of lead changes in the first three quarters. In the fourth quarter, West's Bob Davies scored eight successive points to give the West a lead. The West outscored the East 22–20 in the fourth quarter to win the game by four points. However, the All-Star Game Most Valuable Player Award went to Minneapolis Lakers center George Mikan who scored a game-high 22 points and 16 rebounds for the West. Boston Celtics' Ed Macauley led the East with 18 points while Syracuse Nationals' Dolph Schayes recorded 13 rebounds. Despite losing the game, the East had more balanced scoring with four players scoring in double-figures while the West only had Mikan and Larry Foust scoring in double-figures. Both teams did not shoot well, the East had 37.9 field goal percentage, while the West only managed to make 35.4 percent of its shots. The combined 154 points scored is the lowest total points scored in an All-Star Game.

=== Box score ===
January 13, 1953

Eastern All-Stars 75, Western All-Stars 79
Scoring by quarter: 20–20, 14–15, 21–22, 20–22
Pts: Ed Macauley 18; Rebs: Dolph Schayes 13; Asts: Cousy, Macauley, Schayes 3 each	Pts: George Mikan 22; Rebs: George Mikan 16; Asts: Andy Phillip 8

Allen County War Memorial Coliseum, Fort Wayne, Indiana
Attendance: 10,322
Referees:
- Sid Borgia
- Bud Lowell

Legend
Pos	Position	Min	Minutes played	FGM	Field goals made	FGA	Field goal attempted	FTM	Free throws made
FTA	Free throw attempted	Reb	Rebounds	Ast	Assists	PF	Personal fouls	Pts	Points

Eastern All-Stars
Player	Pos	Min	FGM	FGA	FTM	FTA	Reb	Ast	PF	Pts
Starters
Bob Cousy	G	36	4	11	7	7	5	3	1	15
Bill Sharman	G	26	5	8	1	1	4	0	2	11
Dolph Schayes	F/C	26	2	7	4	4	13	3	3	8
Harry Gallatin	F/C	19	1	4	1	2	3	2	1	3
Ed Macauley	C/F	35	5	12	8	8	7	3	2	18
Bench
Neil Johnston	C	27	5	13	1	2	12	0	2	11
Billy Gabor	G/F	25	0	3	0	1	5	2	1	0
Carl Braun	G/F	21	1	4	1	1	3	2	2	3
Paul Seymour	G/F	14	2	3	1	2	3	2	1	5
Don Barksdale	F/C	11	0	1	1	3	3	2	0	1
Fred Scolari	G	Did not play due to injury								
Team totals		240	25	66	25	31	58	19	15	75

Western All-Stars
Player	Pos	Min	FGM	FGA	FTM	FTA	Reb	Ast	PF	Pts
Starters
Bobby Wanzer	G	22	4	7	1	1	2	2	1	9
Andy Phillip	G/F	36	4	9	1	1	6	8	2	9
Mel Hutchins	F/C	30	1	8	0	1	6	5	2	2
Vern Mikkelsen	F/C	19	3	13	0	0	6	3	3	6
George Mikan	C	40	9	26	4	4	16	2	2	22
Bench
Slater Martin	G	26	2	10	1	1	2	1	2	5
Arnie Risen	C/F	19	2	7	1	3	9	2	3	5
Larry Foust	C/F	18	5	7	0	0	6	0	4	10
Bob Davies	G/F	17	3	7	3	6	3	2	2	9
Leo Barnhorst	F/G	13	1	2	0	1	3	2	0	2
Team totals		240	34	96	11	18	59	27	21	79
