= 1958 NBA All-Star Game =

Exhibition basketball game

	1	2	3	4	Total
East	30	31	31	38	130
West	31	35	25	27	118
- Date: Tuesday, January 21, 1958
- Arena: Kiel Auditorium
- City: St. Louis
- MVP: Bob Pettit
- Attendance: 12,854

NBA All-Star Game
< 1957	1959 >

The 8th Annual NBA All Star Game was an exhibition basketball game held on January 21, 1958, at the Kiel Auditorium in St. Louis, Missouri, home of the St. Louis Hawks. This was the first NBA All-Star Game to be held in St. Louis.

The coaches were the Boston Celtics' Red Auerbach for the East and the Hawks' Alex Hannum for the West, as both teams had led their respective divisions prior to the game. The East won the game 130–118. The Hawks' Bob Pettit was named the Most Valuable Player.

== Roster ==
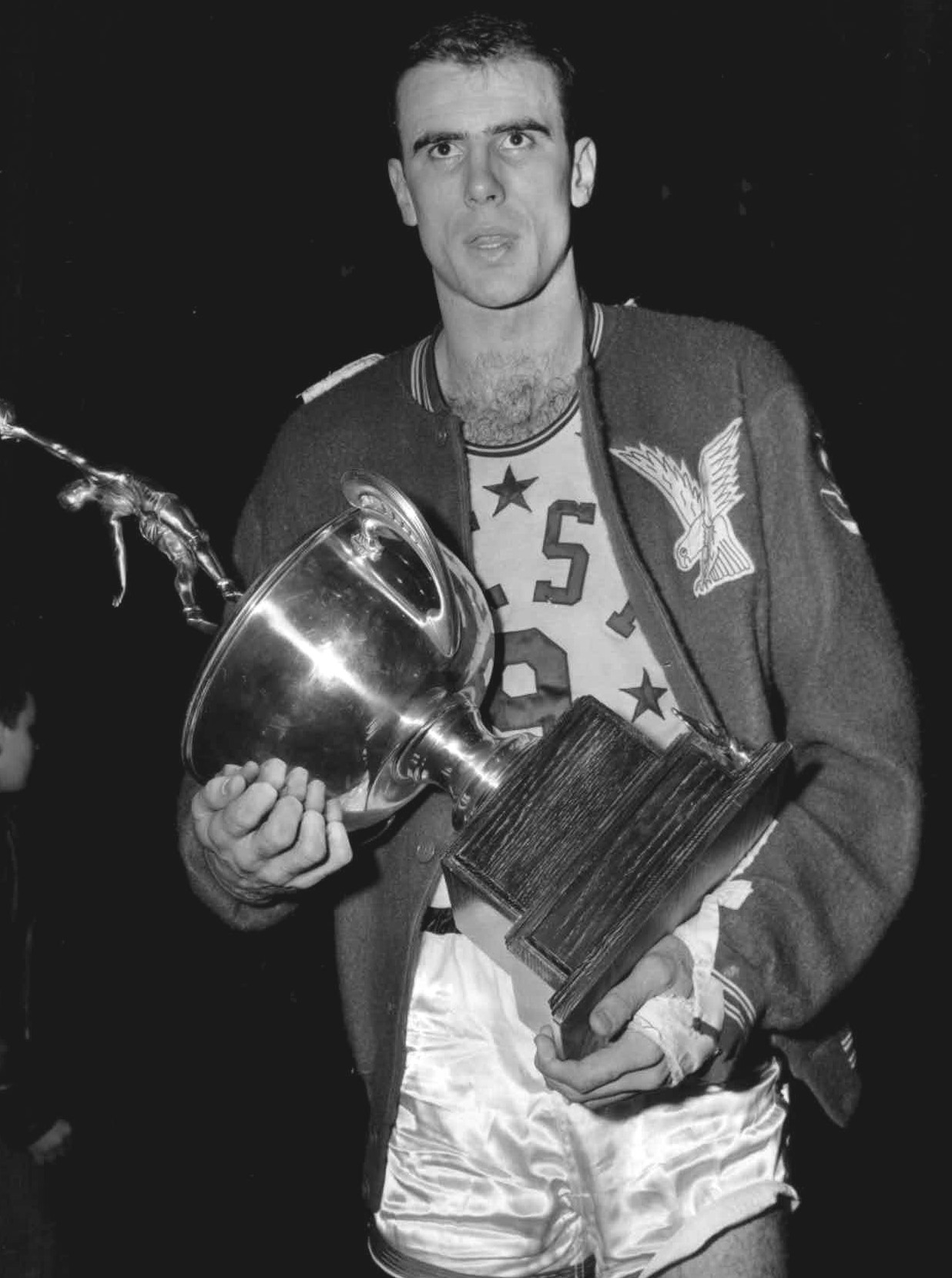
Bob Pettit was named as the 1958 All-Star Game MVP

Legend
	Starter		MVP	MIN	Minutes played
FG	Field goals	FGA	Field goal attempts	FT	Free throws	FTA	Free throw attempts
REB	Rebounds	AST	Assists	PF	Personal fouls	PTS	Points

Eastern All-Stars
Pos.	Player	Team	No. of selections
Starters
G	Bob Cousy	Boston Celtics	8th
F	Willie Naulls	New York Knicks	1st
C	Bill Russell	Boston Celtics	1st
F/C	Dolph Schayes	Syracuse Nationals	8th
G	Bill Sharman	Boston Celtics	6th
Reserves
F	Paul Arizin	Philadelphia Warriors	6th
G	Larry Costello	Syracuse Nationals	1st
G	Richie Guerin	New York Knicks	1st
C	Neil Johnston	Philadelphia Warriors	6th
F	Kenny Sears	New York Knicks	1st
Head coach: Red Auerbach (Boston Celtics)

Western All-Stars
Pos.	Player	Team	No. of selections
Starters
G	Dick Garmaker	Minneapolis Lakers	2nd
G	Slater Martin	St. Louis Hawks	6th
F/C	Bob Pettit	St. Louis Hawks	4th
F/C	Maurice Stokes	Cincinnati Royals	3rd
F/G	George Yardley	Detroit Pistons	4th
Reserves
F/C	Larry Foust	Minneapolis Lakers	7th
F	Cliff Hagan	St. Louis Hawks	1st
G	Dick McGuire	Detroit Pistons	6th
G	Gene Shue	Detroit Pistons	1st
F/G	Jack Twyman	Cincinnati Royals	2nd
Head coach:Alex Hannum (St. Louis Hawks)

== Eastern Division ==
Head Coach: Red Auerbach, Boston Celtics

Player	Team	MIN	FG	FGA	FT	FTA	REB	AST	PF	PTS
Dolph Schayes	Syracuse Nationals	39	6	15	6	6	9	2	4	18
Bob Cousy	Boston Celtics	31	8	20	4	6	5	10	0	20
Bill Russell	Boston Celtics	26	5	12	1	3	11	2	5	11
Bill Sharman	Boston Celtics	25	6	19	3	3	4	3	2	15
Willie Naulls	New York Knicks	15	3	9	2	2	3	0	0	8
Paul Arizin	Philadelphia Warriors	29	11	17	2	2	8	2	3	24
Neil Johnston	Philadelphia Warriors	22	6	13	2	2	8	1	5	14
Richie Guerin	New York Knicks	22	2	10	3	4	8	7	3	7
Larry Costello	Syracuse Nationals	17	0	6	1	1	1	4	2	1
Kenny Sears	New York Knicks	14	4	8	4	5	1	0	1	12
Totals		240	51	129	28	34	58	31	25	130

== Western Division ==
Head Coach: Alex Hannum, St. Louis Hawks

Player	Team	MIN	FG	FGA	FT	FTA	REB	AST	PF	PTS
Bob Pettit	St. Louis Hawks	38	10	21	8	10	26	1	1	28
Maurice Stokes	Cincinnati Royals	36	3	13	4	7	14	3	2	10
George Yardley	Detroit Pistons	32	8	15	3	5	9	1	1	19
Slater Martin	St. Louis Hawks	26	2	9	2	4	2	8	3	6
Dick Garmaker	Minneapolis Lakers	13	1	9	3	3	6	1	4	5
Dick McGuire	Detroit Pistons	31	2	4	0	0	7	10	4	4
Gene Shue	Detroit Pistons	25	8	11	2	3	2	0	3	18
Jack Twyman	Cincinnati Royals	25	8	13	2	2	3	0	3	18
Larry Foust	Minneapolis Lakers	13	1	4	8	8	3	0	3	10
Cliff Hagan	St. Louis Hawks	Did not play due to injury								
Totals		240	43	99	32	42	72	24	24	118
