= List of NBA All-Star vote leaders =

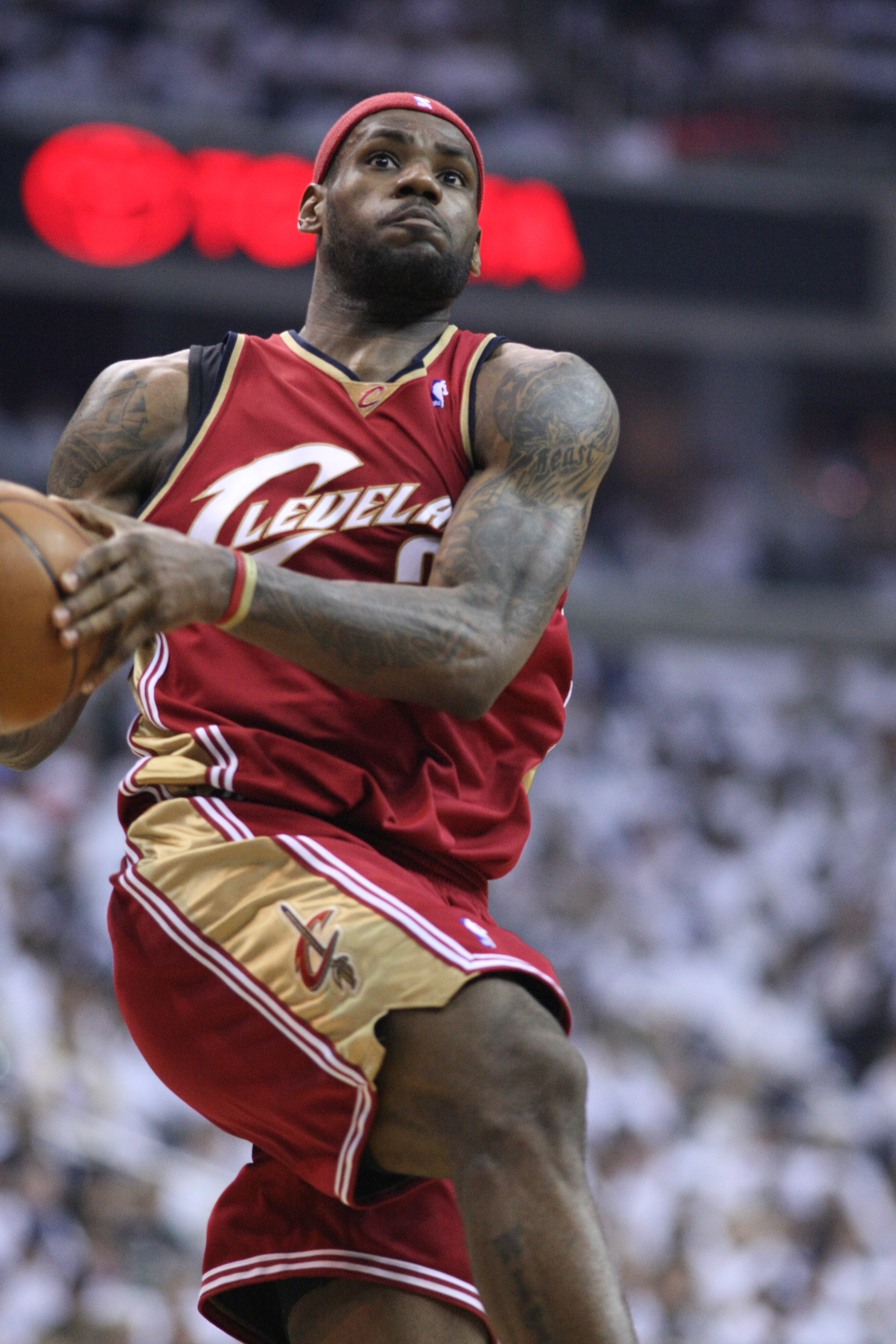
LeBron James led the voting 10 times and is considered one of the greatest basketball players of all time.

This article lists all-time leading ballot leaders achieved in the NBA All-Star Game fan ballot.

== Yearly leaders ==
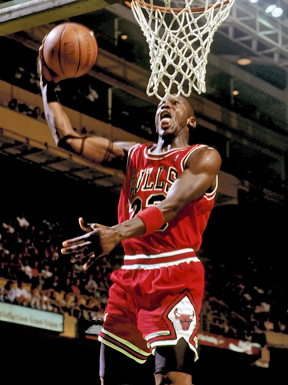
Hall of Famer Michael Jordan led the voting 9 times and is considered one of the greatest basketball players of all time.

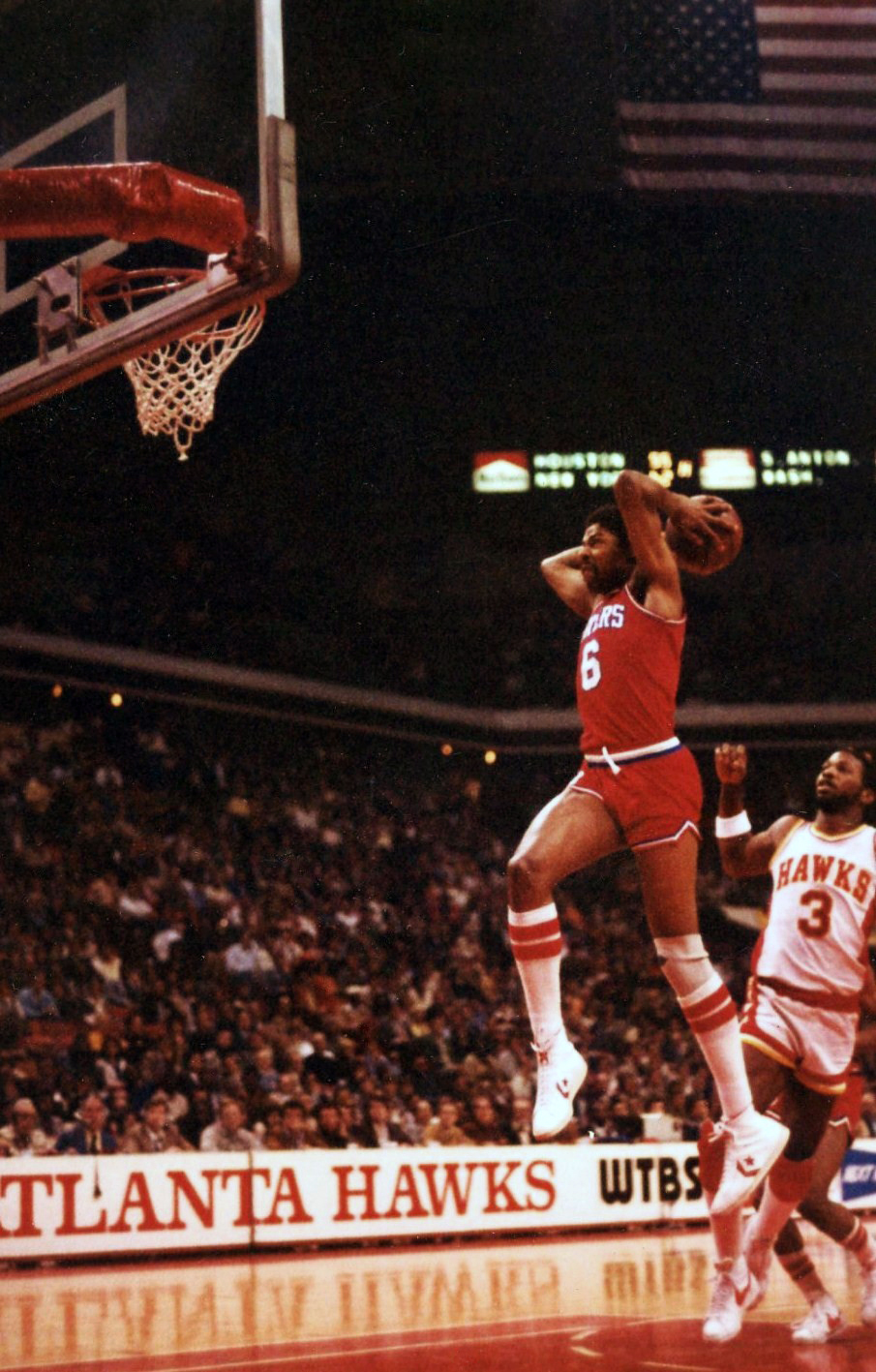
Hall of Famer Julius Erving led the voting 4 times, largely because of his flashy moves.

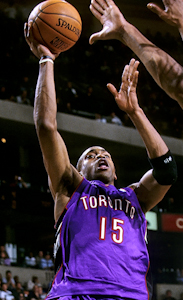
Vince Carter was a fan favorite for the all-star game in his prime for his high flying dunks. He led the voting 4 times throughout his career.

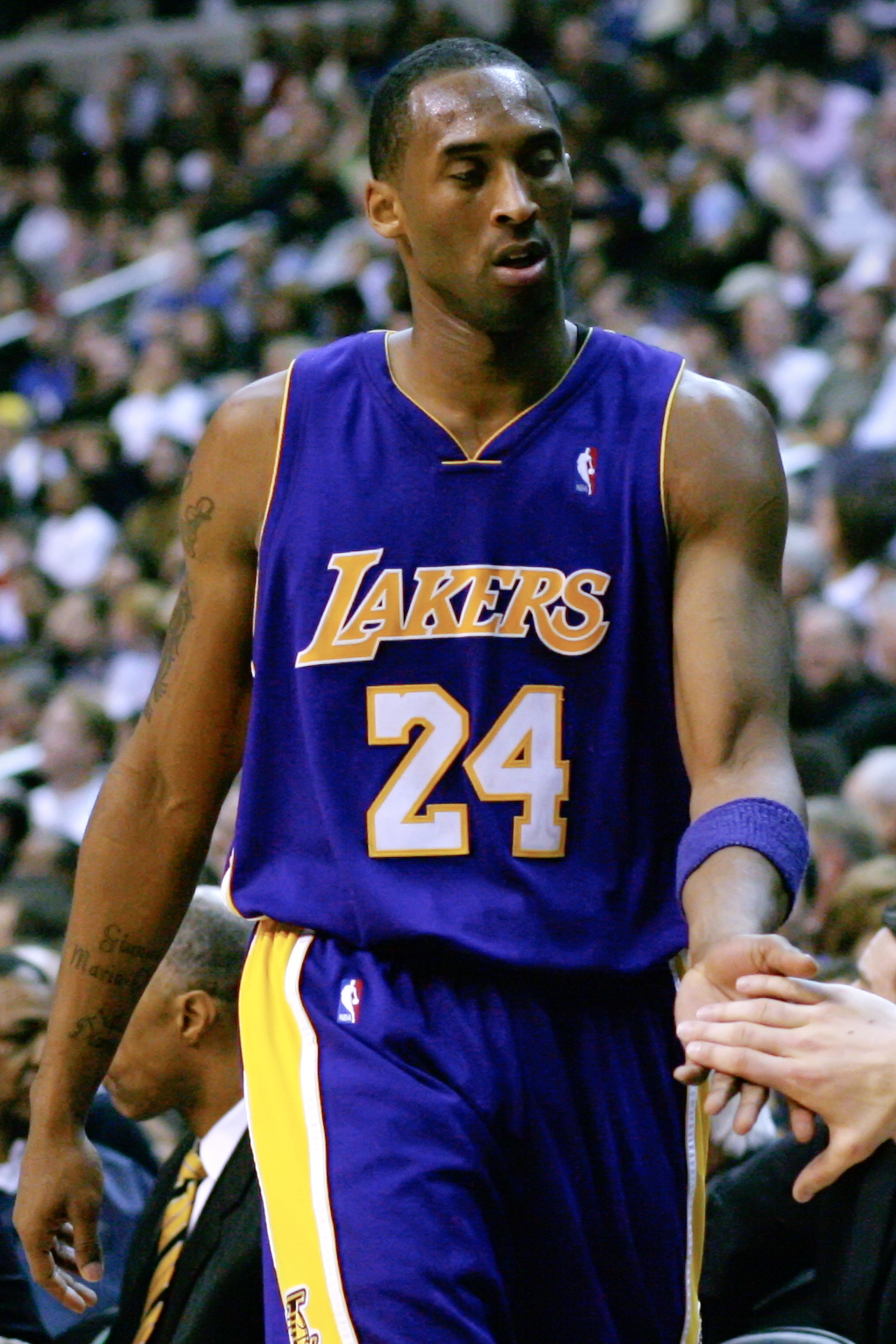
Kobe Bryant won the 1997 slam dunk contest and was always a fan favorite. He led the voting 4 times and is considered one of the greatest basketball players of all time.

^	Denotes players who are still active in the NBA
*	Elected to the Naismith Memorial Basketball Hall of Fame as a player
†	Not yet eligible for Hall of Fame consideration (Note: A player is not eligible for induction into the Naismith Memorial Basketball Hall of Fame until he has been fully retired for three calendar years.)
§	1st time eligible for Hall of Fame in 2024
bold	Denotes the player won the All-Star Game MVP award that year
Player (X)	Denotes the number of times the player led the ballots

Season	Player	Position	Nationality	Team	No. of votes
1975	Bob McAdoo*	Center	United States	Buffalo Braves	98,325
1976	Rick Barry*	Forward	United States	Golden State Warriors	135,471
1977	David Thompson*	Forward	United States	Denver Nuggets	319,047
1978	Julius Erving*	Forward	United States	Philadelphia 76ers	396,503
1979	George Gervin*	Guard	United States	San Antonio Spurs	427,540
1980	George Gervin* (2)	Guard	United States	San Antonio Spurs	286,463
1981	Julius Erving* (2)	Forward	United States	Philadelphia 76ers	304,600
1982	Julius Erving* (3)	Forward	United States	Philadelphia 76ers	432,230
1983	Julius Erving* (4)	Forward	United States	Philadelphia 76ers	707,012
1984	Moses Malone*	Center	United States	Philadelphia 76ers	927,779
1985	Magic Johnson*	Guard	United States	Los Angeles Lakers	957,447
1986	Magic Johnson* (2)	Guard	United States	Los Angeles Lakers	1,060,892
1987	Michael Jordan*	Guard	United States	Chicago Bulls	1,141,733
1988	Michael Jordan* (2)	Guard	United States	Chicago Bulls	1,121,285
1989	Michael Jordan* (3)	Guard	United States	Chicago Bulls	1,003,062
1990	Michael Jordan* (4)	Guard	United States	Chicago Bulls	321,114
1991	Michael Jordan* (5)	Guard	United States	Chicago Bulls	1,217,429
1992	Michael Jordan* (6)	Guard	United States	Chicago Bulls	1,049,573
1993	Michael Jordan* (7)	Guard	United States	Chicago Bulls	1,035,824
1994	Charles Barkley*	Forward	United States	Phoenix Suns	794,936
1995	Grant Hill*	Forward	United States	Detroit Pistons	1,289,585
1996	Grant Hill* (2)	Forward	United States	Detroit Pistons	1,358,004
1997	Michael Jordan* (8)	Guard	United States	Chicago Bulls	2,451,136
1998	Michael Jordan* (9)	Guard	United States	Chicago Bulls	1,028,235
2000	Vince Carter*	Forward	United States	Toronto Raptors	1,911,973
2001	Vince Carter* (2)	Forward	United States	Toronto Raptors	1,717,687
2002	Vince Carter* (3)	Forward	United States	Toronto Raptors	1,470,176
2003	Kobe Bryant*	Guard	United States	Los Angeles Lakers	1,474,386
2004	Vince Carter* (4)	Forward	United States	Toronto Raptors	2,127,183
2005	Yao Ming*	Center	China	Houston Rockets	2,558,278
2006	Yao Ming* (2)	Center	China	Houston Rockets	1,990,303
2007	LeBron James^	Forward	United States	Cleveland Cavaliers	2,516,049
2008	Kevin Garnett*	Forward	United States	Boston Celtics	2,399,148
2009	Dwight Howard*	Center	United States	Orlando Magic	3,150,181
2010	LeBron James^ (2)	Forward	United States	Cleveland Cavaliers	2,549,693
2011	Kobe Bryant* (2)	Guard	United States	Los Angeles Lakers	2,380,016
2012	Dwight Howard* (2)	Center	United States	Orlando Magic	1,600,390
2013	Kobe Bryant* (3)	Guard	United States	Los Angeles Lakers	1,591,437
2014	LeBron James^ (3)	Forward	United States	Miami Heat	1,416,419
2015	Stephen Curry^	Guard	United States	Golden State Warriors	1,513,324
2016	Kobe Bryant* (4)	Forward	United States	Los Angeles Lakers	1,891,614
2017	LeBron James^ (4)	Forward	United States	Cleveland Cavaliers	1,893,751
2018	LeBron James^ (5)	Forward	United States	Cleveland Cavaliers	2,638,294
2019	LeBron James^ (6)	Forward	United States	Los Angeles Lakers	4,620,809
2020	LeBron James^ (7)	Forward	United States	Los Angeles Lakers	6,275,459
2021	LeBron James^ (8)	Forward	United States	Los Angeles Lakers	5,922,554
2022	LeBron James^ (9)	Forward	United States	Los Angeles Lakers	9,128,231
2023	LeBron James^ (10)	Forward	United States	Los Angeles Lakers	7,418,116
2024	Giannis Antetokounmpo^	Forward	Greece	Milwaukee Bucks	5,427,874
2025	Giannis Antetokounmpo^ (2)	Forward	Greece	Milwaukee Bucks	4,435,266
2026	Luka Dončić^	Guard	Slovenia	Los Angeles Lakers	3,402,967

== Multi-time leaders ==
Times led	Player	Years
10	LeBron James	2007, 2010, 2014, 2017, 2018, 2019, 2020, 2021, 2022, 2023
9	Michael Jordan	1987, 1988, 1989, 1990, 1991, 1992, 1993, 1997, 1998
4	Julius Erving	1978, 1981, 1982, 1983
4	Vince Carter	2000, 2001, 2002, 2004
4	Kobe Bryant	2003, 2011, 2013, 2016
2	George Gervin	1979, 1980
2	Magic Johnson	1985, 1986
2	Grant Hill	1995, 1996
2	Yao Ming	2005, 2006
2	Dwight Howard	2009, 2012
2	Giannis Antetokounmpo	2024, 2025

== See also ==
- List of NBA All-Stars
- NBA All-Star Game Most Valuable Player Award
