= 1984 NBA All-Star Game =

Exhibition basketball game

| | 1 | 2 | 3 | 4 | OT | Total |
|---|---|---|---|---|---|---|
| East | 32 | 30 | 37 | 33 | 22 | 154 |
| West | 40 | 36 | 31 | 25 | 13 | 145 |
- Date: January 29, 1984
- Arena: McNichols Sports Arena
- City: Denver
- MVP: Isiah Thomas
- National anthem: The Temptations
- Attendance: 17,500
- Network: CBS; ESPN (Slam Dunk Contest)
- Announcers: Dick Stockton, Tom Heinsohn (CBS); Roger Twibell, Greg Gumbel, Dick Vitale, and John Andariese (ESPN)

NBA All-Star Game
| < 1983 | 1985 > |

The 34th NBA All-Star Game was an exhibition basketball game played on January 29, 1984, at McNichols Sports Arena in Denver, Colorado, the home of the Denver Nuggets. This was the first NBA All-Star Game to be held in Denver, with the next one held in 2005.

Moses Malone of the Philadelphia 76ers led the All-Star voting; however, he was unable to play due to an injury. The East All-Stars defeated the West All-Stars in overtime 154–145, making it the highest-scoring All-Star Game at that time, surpassing the record set in 1961, until it was surpassed in 1987. Isiah Thomas of the Detroit Pistons was named the MVP of the game, after scoring 21 points and dishing 15 assists.

This event marked the event's expansion into a multi-day format with side events such as the inaugural NBA Slam Dunk Contest and the return of the NBA All-Star Legends Game for retired players after a 20-year hiatus; both were held on January 28, 1984. As of 2026, this is the most recent NBA All-Star Game played in January, as the event has been held every February since 1985, except in 2021 when it was held in March due to the COVID-19 pandemic.

== Coaches ==
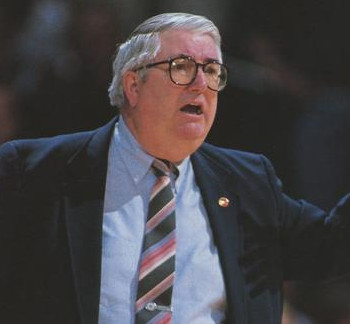
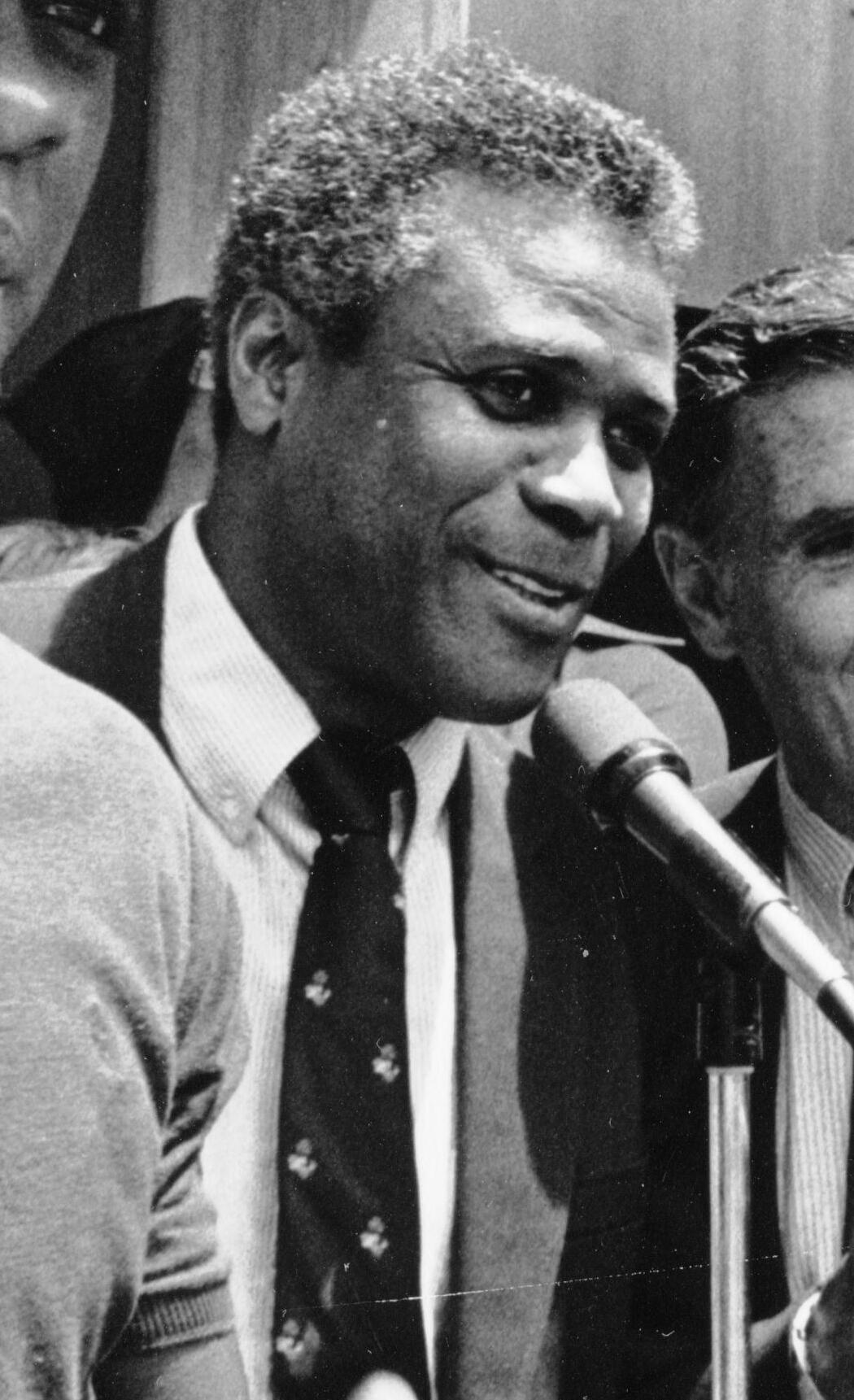
Frank Layden and K.C. Jones were selected as the West and East head coach, respectively.

K. C. Jones, head coach of the Eastern Conference leader Boston Celtics, qualified as coach of the Eastern All-Stars. Frank Layden, head coach of the Western Conference leader Utah Jazz, qualified as coach of the Western All-Stars.

== Rosters ==
Eastern Conference All-Stars
| Pos. | Player | Team | Appearance |
Coach
| HC | K.C. Jones | Boston Celtics | 1st |
Starters
| PG | Isiah Thomas | Detroit Pistons | 3rd |
| SG | Sidney Moncrief | Milwaukee Bucks | 3rd |
| SF | Julius Erving | Philadelphia 76ers | 8th |
| PF | Larry Bird | Boston Celtics | 5th |
| C | Moses Malone^{DNP} | Philadelphia 76ers | 7th |
Reserves
| SF | Bernard King | New York Knicks | 2nd |
| C/PF | Bill Laimbeer | Detroit Pistons | 2nd |
| SF/SG | Kelly Tripucka | Detroit Pistons | 2nd |
| C/PF | Jeff Ruland | Washington Bullets | 1st |
| PF | Kevin McHale | Boston Celtics | 1st |
| SG | Andrew Toney | Philadelphia 76ers | 2nd |
| SG/PG | Otis Birdsong | New Jersey Nets | 4th |
| C | Robert Parish^{ST} | Boston Celtics | 4th |

Western Conference All-Stars
| Pos. | Player | Team | Appearance |
Coach
| HC | Frank Layden | Utah Jazz | 1st |
Starters
| PG | Magic Johnson | Los Angeles Lakers | 4th |
| SG | George Gervin | San Antonio Spurs | 8th |
| SF | Alex English | Denver Nuggets | 3rd |
| PF | Adrian Dantley | Utah Jazz | 4th |
| C | Kareem Abdul-Jabbar | Los Angeles Lakers | 14th |
Reserves
| SF | Mark Aguirre | Dallas Mavericks | 1st |
| PF/C | Ralph Sampson | Houston Rockets | 1st |
| SF/SG | Jim Paxson | Portland Trail Blazers | 2nd |
| C/PF | Jack Sikma | Seattle SuperSonics | 6th |
| SF | Kiki Vandeweghe | Denver Nuggets | 2nd |
| PG | Rickey Green | Utah Jazz | 1st |
| SF/SG | Walter Davis | Phoenix Suns | 5th |

- DNPMoses Malone was unable to participate due to injury. Bill Laimbeer was named as his replacement.
- STEastern Conference head coach K.C. Jones chose Robert Parish to start in place of the injured Malone.

== Score by quarter ==
| Score by periods: | 1 | 2 | 3 | 4 | OT | Final |
| East | 32 | 30 | 37 | 33 | 22 | 154 |
| West | 40 | 36 | 31 | 25 | 13 | 145 |

- Halftime— West, 76–62
- Third Quarter— West, 107–99

== Slam Dunk Contest ==
The first ever NBA Slam Dunk Contest was held on January 28, 1984.

Indicates the champion

| # | P | Player | Team | First Round | | | | Semifinals | | | | Finals | | | |
| # | P | Player | Team | 1 | 2 | 3 | T | 1 | 2 | 3 | T | 1 | 2 | 3 | T |
|---|---|---|---|---|---|---|---|---|---|---|---|---|---|---|---|
| 1 | F | Larry Nance | Phoenix Suns | 44 | 44 | 46 | 134 | 49 | 48 | 43 | 140 | 48 | 39 | 47 | 134 |
| 2 | F | Julius Erving | Philadelphia 76ers | 39 | 47 | 48 | 134 | 44 | 49 | 47 | 140 | 47 | 25 | 50 | 122 |
| 3 | F | Dominique Wilkins | Atlanta Hawks | 47 | 39 | 49 | 135 | 48 | 48 | 41 | 137 | DNQ | | | |
| 4 | G | Darrell Griffith | Utah Jazz | 39 | 40 | 42 | 121 | 42 | 42 | 24 | 108 | DNQ | | | |
| 5 | F/C | Edgar Jones | San Antonio Spurs | 32 | 43 | 43 | 118 | DNQ | | | | | | | |
| 6 | C/F | Ralph Sampson | Houston Rockets | 37 | 40 | 41 | 118 | DNQ | | | | | | | |
| 7 | F | Orlando Woolridge | Chicago Bulls | 23 | 45 | 48 | 116 | DNQ | | | | | | | |
| 8 | G/F | Clyde Drexler | Portland Trail Blazers | 40 | 24 | 44 | 108 | DNQ | | | | | | | |
| 9 | G | Michael Cooper | Los Angeles Lakers | 24 | 24 | 22 | 70 | DNQ | | | | | | | |

== NBA All-Star Legends Game ==
1984 also saw the return of the Legends Game after a 20-year absence. The West won the game over the East 64–63.

- In the East squad, it featured the likes of Pete Maravich, Oscar Robertson, Sam Jones, John Havlicek, Dave DeBusschere, Nate Thurmond, Zelmo Beaty, Wes Unseld, Bill Sharman, Tom Heinsohn and Dick McGuire.
- In the West squad, it featured the likes of Rick Barry, Lou Hudson, Earl Monroe, Hal Greer, Bob Pettit, Jerry West, Connie Hawkins, Dolph Schayes, Johnny "Red" Kerr, and Dave Bing.
