= 1992 NBA All-Star Game =

Exhibition basketball game

	1	2	3	4	Total
West	44	35	36	38	153
East	31	24	28	30	113
- Date: February 9, 1992
- Arena: Orlando Arena
- City: Orlando
- MVP: Magic Johnson
- National anthem: Michael Bolton
- Halftime show: Vanilla Ice
- Attendance: 14,272
- Network: NBC; TNT (All-Star Saturday)
- Announcers: Dick Enberg and Mike Fratello; Bob Neal, Doug Collins and Hubie Brown (All-Star Saturday)

NBA All-Star Game
< 1991	1993 >

The 1992 NBA All-Star Game was the 42nd edition of the All-Star Game held at the Orlando Arena in Orlando, Florida, home of the Orlando Magic, on February 9, 1992. The West defeated the East, 153–113, setting an NBA All-Star Game record for the largest margin of victory at 40 points. The game is memorable for the return of Los Angeles Lakers guard Magic Johnson, who retired before the 1991–92 NBA season after contracting HIV. Johnson was given the game's MVP award after scoring a game-high 25 points. He also took the final shot of the game, a three-pointer, and the final 14.5 seconds of the game were not played. The game was broadcast by NBC for the second consecutive year.

== Overview ==
The All-Star Game features NBA players voted in by fans and coaches by conference and position. The teams are divided into the Western Conference and Eastern Conference. All 11 professional basketball players of the "Dream Team," the 1992 United States men's Olympic basketball team, were also on the 1992 All-Star Game roster.

== Coaches ==
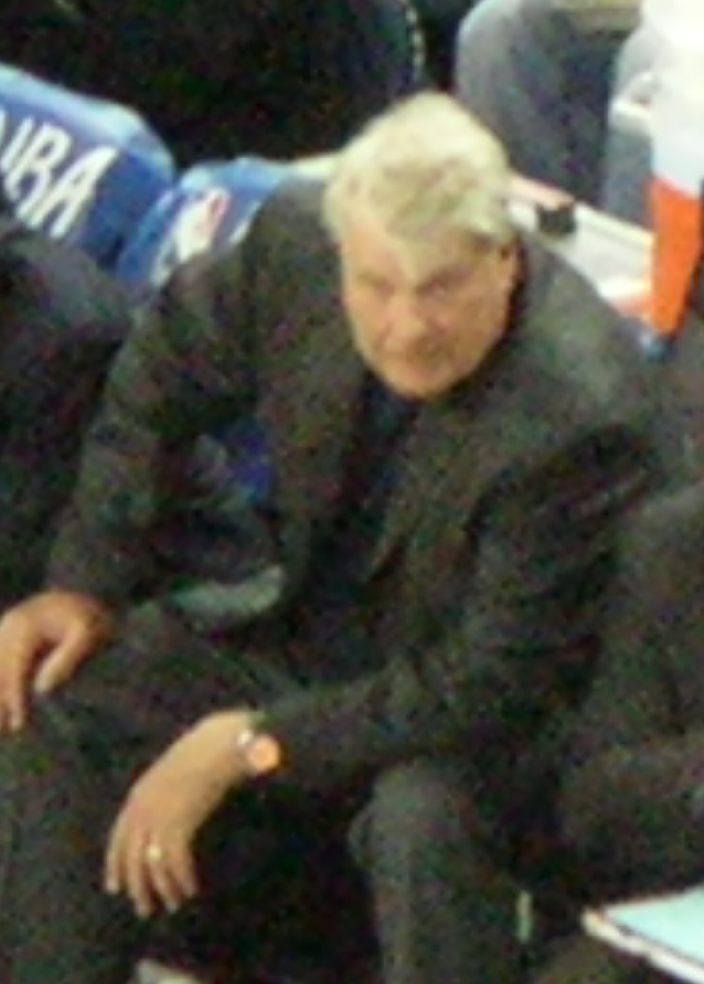
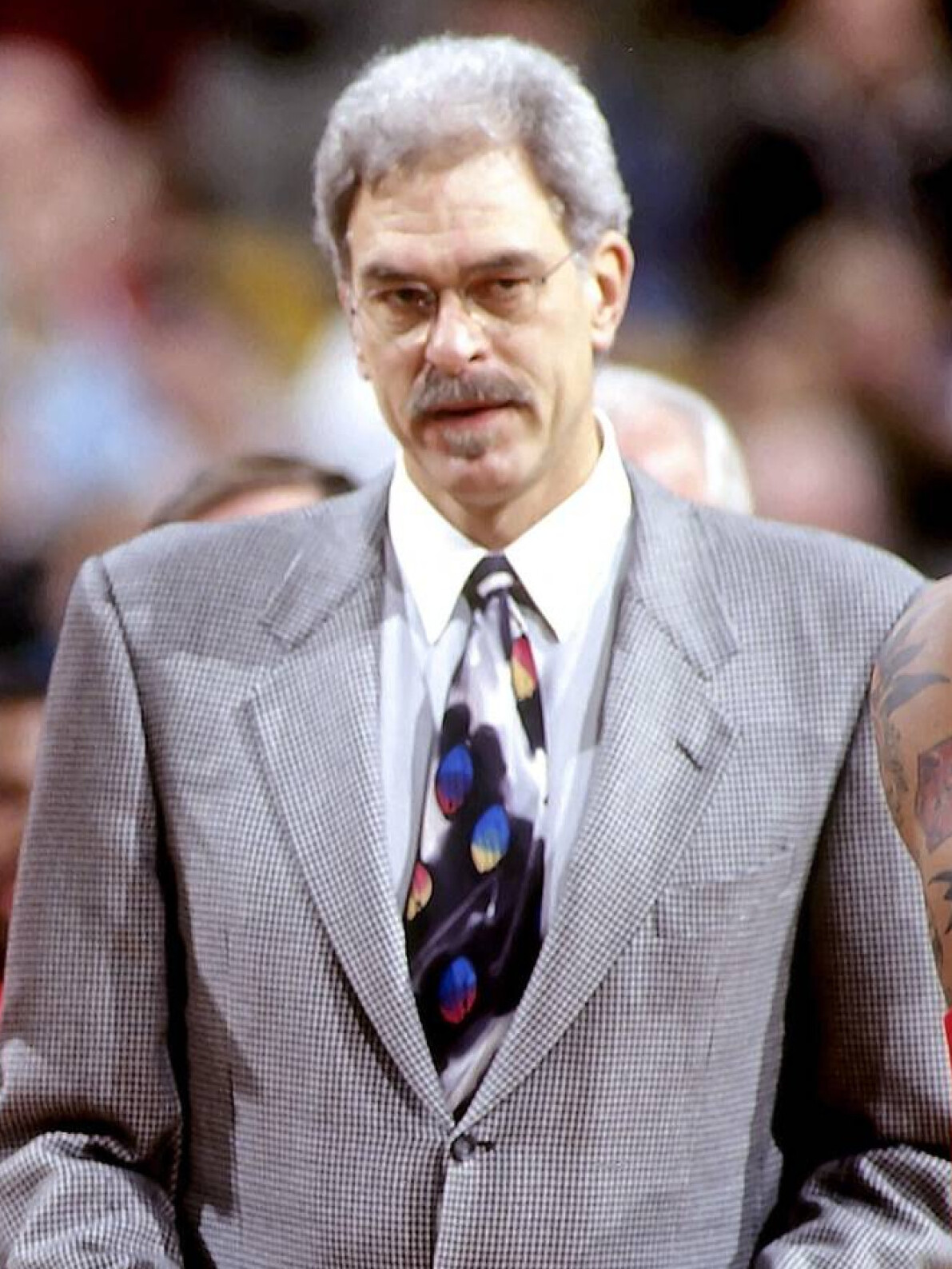
Don Nelson (left) and Phil Jackson (right) were selected as the West and East head coach, respectively.

The Western All-Stars were coached by Don Nelson, the head coach of the Golden State Warriors. Although the Portland Trail Blazers have the best record in the Western Conference entering the game, their head coach, Rick Adelman, was ineligible to coach in the All-Star Game because he had coached in the previous year's game and league rules prohibit a coach from coaching in consecutive All-Star Games. The Eastern All-Stars were coached by Phil Jackson, the head coach of the Eastern Conference leader Chicago Bulls.

== Game description ==
Los Angeles Lakers guard Magic Johnson had announced his retirement at the beginning of the 1991–92 season due to testing positive for HIV. Nevertheless, he was voted in by the fans as a guard for the Western Conference team in the All-Star Game. This remains the only time in NBA All-Star Game history that the “road” team was introduced last, specifically so that Magic Johnson was able to be the last player introduced. He led all players with 25 points and was awarded the MVP. He also took the final shot of the game, a three-pointer, after which point the game ended with 14.5 seconds left, as players ran onto the court to congratulate Johnson and exchange high-fives. Of his performance, Gary Washburn of the Boston Globe wrote, "It was supposed to be a swan song, one of professional sport's most emotional and riveting moments: the farewell of Magic Johnson from the NBA and perhaps mainstream society after announcing that he had contracted HIV."

The game ended with the West defeating the East 153–113, setting a new record for largest margin of victory (40 points) in the NBA All-Star Game.

== Rosters ==
Eastern Conference All-Stars
Pos.	Player	Team	Appearance
Coach
HC	Phil Jackson	Chicago Bulls	1st
Starters
PG	Isiah Thomas	Detroit Pistons	11th
SG	Michael Jordan	Chicago Bulls	8th
SF	Larry Bird	Boston Celtics	12th (DNP)
PF	Charles Barkley	Philadelphia 76ers	6th
C	Patrick Ewing	New York Knicks	6th
Reserves
PG	Michael Adams	Washington Bullets	1st (REP)
C	Brad Daugherty	Cleveland Cavaliers	4th
SG/PG	Joe Dumars	Detroit Pistons	3rd
SG/SF	Reggie Lewis	Boston Celtics	1st
SF	Scottie Pippen	Chicago Bulls	2nd (ST)
PG	Mark Price	Cleveland Cavaliers	2nd
PF	Dennis Rodman	Detroit Pistons	2nd
SF	Dominique Wilkins	Atlanta Hawks	7th (DNP)
PF/C	Kevin Willis	Atlanta Hawks	1st (REP)

Western Conference All-Stars
Pos.	Player	Team	Appearance
Coach
HC	Don Nelson	Golden State Warriors	1st
Starters
PG	Magic Johnson	—N/a	12th
SG	Clyde Drexler	Portland Trail Blazers	6th
SF	Chris Mullin	Golden State Warriors	4th
PF	Karl Malone	Utah Jazz	5th
C	David Robinson	San Antonio Spurs	3rd
Reserves
PG	Tim Hardaway	Golden State Warriors	2nd
SG	Jeff Hornacek	Phoenix Suns	1st
SF/SG	Dan Majerle	Phoenix Suns	1st
C	Dikembe Mutombo	Denver Nuggets	1st
C	Hakeem Olajuwon	Houston Rockets	7th
PG	John Stockton	Utah Jazz	4th
PF/C	Otis Thorpe	Houston Rockets	1st
SF	James Worthy	Los Angeles Lakers	7th

- Both Larry Bird and Dominique Wilkins were selected but did not play due to injury. Kevin Willis replaced Wilkins. Michael Adams replaced Bird.
- Scottie Pippen started in place of the injured Bird.
- The rosters included the 11 professional players who would be part of the Dream Team, which won gold medals at the 1992 Summer Olympics in Barcelona.

== Boxscore ==
=== Western All-Stars ===
Player	Team	Min	Fgm	Fga	Ftm	Fta	Reb	Ast	Pts
Karl Malone	UTA	19	5	7	1	2	7	3	11
Chris Mullin	GS	24	6	7	0	0	1	3	13
David Robinson	SA	18	7	9	5	8	5	2	19
Clyde Drexler	POR	28	10	15	0	0	9	6	22
Earvin Johnson	LAL	29	9	12	4	4	5	9	25
Tim Hardaway	GS	20	5	10	2	2	0	7	14
Hakeem Olajuwon	HOU	20	3	6	1	1	4	2	7
Jeff Hornacek	PHX	24	5	7	0	0	2	3	11
Otis Thorpe	HOU	4	1	1	0	0	0	0	2
James Worthy	LAL	14	4	7	1	1	4	1	9
John Stockton	UTA	18	5	8	0	0	1	5	12
Dan Majerle	PHX	12	2	5	0	0	3	2	4
Dikembe Mutombo	DEN	10	2	4	0	0	2	1	4
TOTAL		240	64	98	14	20	43	44	153

=== Eastern All-Stars ===
Player	Team	Min	Fgm	Fga	Ftm	Fta	Reb	Ast	Pts
Scottie Pippen	CHI	21	6	13	2	3	4	1	14
Charles Barkley	PHI	28	6	14	0	0	9	1	12
Patrick Ewing	NY	17	4	7	2	5	4	0	10
Isiah Thomas	DET	28	7	14	0	0	1	5	15
Michael Jordan	CHI	31	9	17	0	0	1	5	18
Mark Price	CLE	15	1	5	4	4	0	3	6
Brad Daugherty	CLE	15	3	8	0	0	6	1	6
Joe Dumars	DET	17	2	7	0	0	1	3	4
Dennis Rodman	DET	25	2	7	0	0	13	0	4
Reggie Lewis	BOS	15	3	7	1	2	4	2	7
Kevin Willis	ATL	14	4	10	0	0	4	0	8
Michael Adams	WAS	14	4	8	0	0	1	1	9
TOTAL		240	51	117	9	14	48	22	113

== Game data ==
- Attendance: 14,272
- Officials: Darell Garretson, Joe Crawford, Tommy Nuñez
- Broadcast Network: NBC
- Announce Team: Dick Enberg and Mike Fratello

== NBA All-Star Saturday ==
=== Legends Game ===
In this game, the East featured the likes of George Gervin, Jo Jo White, Dan Roundfield, Rick Barry, Connie Hawkins, Spencer Haywood, Dave Bing, Dave Cowens, Norm Nixon and Clifford Ray.

The West squad featured the likes of Calvin Murphy, Doug Collins, Alvan Adams, Bob Love, Artis Gilmore, Bobby Jones, Maurice Lucas, David Thompson, and Jamaal Wilkes.
