= NBA All-Star Game Most Valuable Player =

National Basketball Association award

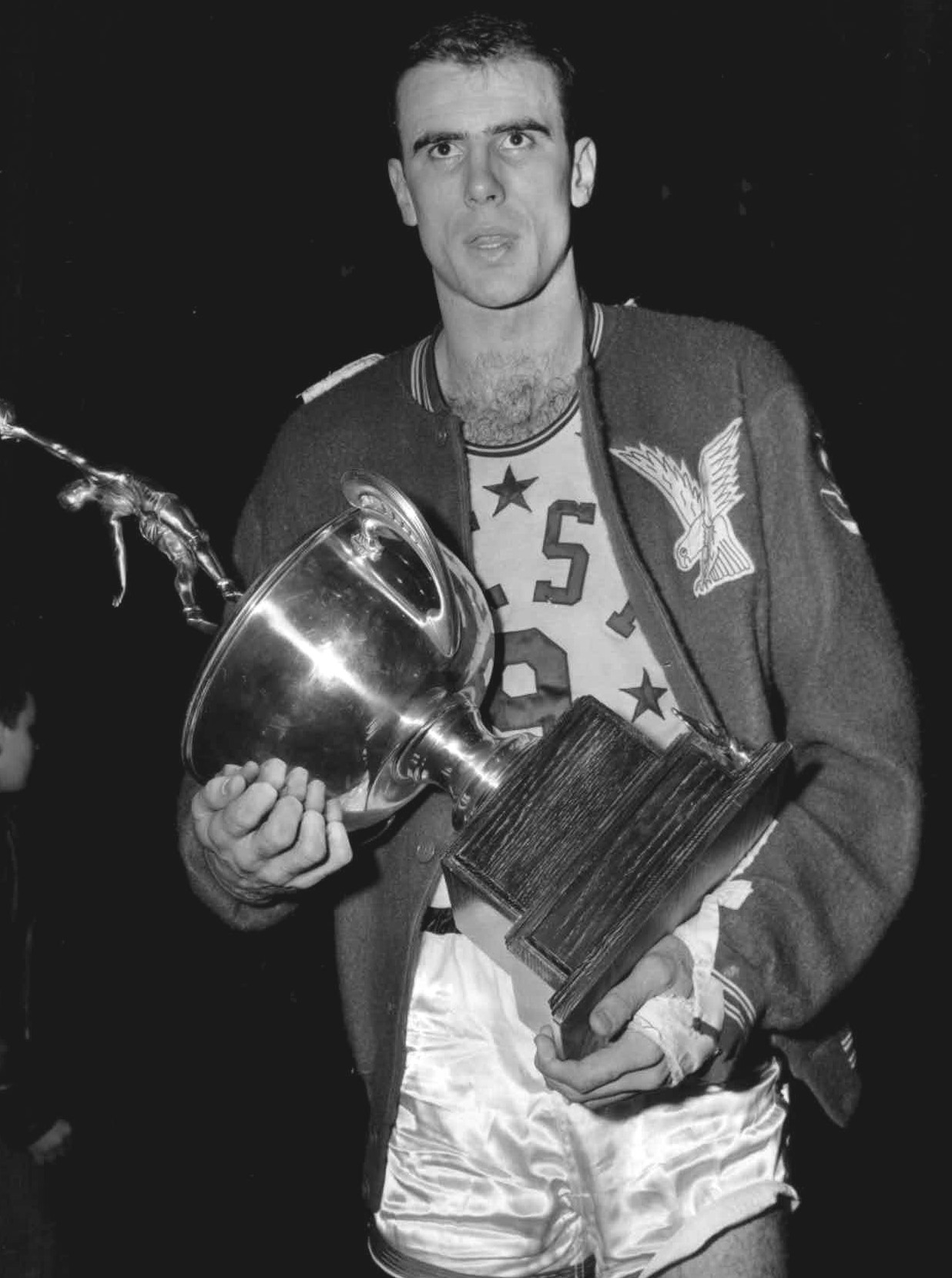
Bob Pettit with his 1958 NBA All-Star Game MVP trophy

The NBA All-Star Game Kobe Bryant Most Valuable Player (MVP) is an annual National Basketball Association (NBA) award given to the player(s) voted best of the annual All-Star Game. The award was established in 1953 when NBA officials decided to designate an MVP for each year's game. The league also re-honored players from the previous two All-Star Games. Ed Macauley and Paul Arizin were selected as the 1951 and 1952 MVP winners respectively. The winner is voted upon by a panel of media members, who cast their vote after the conclusion of the game. The fan voting accounts for 25% of the voting. The player(s) with the most votes or ties for the most votes wins the award. In February 2020, Commissioner Adam Silver renamed the NBA All-Star Game Most Valuable Player in honor of four-time winner Kobe Bryant, who had died in a helicopter crash three weeks prior to the 2020 game.

As of 2026, the most recent recipient is Minnesota Timberwolves guard Anthony Edwards. Bryant and Bob Pettit are the only two players to win the All-Star Game MVP four times. Oscar Robertson, Michael Jordan, Shaquille O'Neal, and LeBron James have each won the award three times, while Bob Cousy, Julius Erving, Isiah Thomas, Magic Johnson, Karl Malone, Allen Iverson, Russell Westbrook, Kevin Durant, and Stephen Curry have all won the award twice. James became the youngest to win the award in 2006 at the age of 21 years and 1 month. No All-Star Game MVP was named in 1999 since the game was canceled due to the league's lockout. Four of the games had joint winners—Elgin Baylor and Pettit in 1959, John Stockton and Malone in 1993, O'Neal and Tim Duncan in 2000, and O'Neal and Bryant in 2009. O'Neal became the first player in All-Star history to share two MVP awards as well as the first player to win the award with multiple teams. The Los Angeles Lakers have had eleven winners while the Boston Celtics have had nine. Duncan of the U.S. Virgin Islands, Kyrie Irving of Australia, and Giannis Antetokounmpo of Greece are the only winners not born in the United States. Both Duncan and Irving (Note: Kyrie Irving was born in Australia to American parents who returned to the U.S. when he was two years old. He has dual U.S. and Australian citizenship, but has represented the United States internationally.) are American citizens, but are considered "international" players by the NBA because they were not born in one of the fifty states or Washington, D.C. Antetokounmpo of Greece is the only winner to be trained entirely outside the U.S.; Irving lived in the U.S. since age two, and Duncan played U.S. college basketball at Wake Forest.

Bob Pettit (1958, 1959) and Russell Westbrook (2015, 2016) are the only players to win consecutive awards. Pettit (1956), Bob Cousy (1957), Wilt Chamberlain (1960), Bill Russell (1963), Oscar Robertson (1964), Willis Reed (1970), Dave Cowens (1973), Michael Jordan (1988, 1996, 1998), Magic Johnson (1990), Shaquille O'Neal (2000), and Allen Iverson (2001) all won the All-Star Game MVP and the NBA Most Valuable Player Award in the same season; Jordan is the only player to do this multiple times. Fifteen players have won the award playing for the team that hosted the All-Star Game: Macauley (1951), Cousy (1957), Pettit (1958, 1962), Chamberlain (1960), Adrian Smith (1966), Rick Barry (1967), Jerry West (1972), Tom Chambers (1987), Jordan (1988), Malone (1993), John Stockton (1993), O'Neal (2004, 2009), Bryant (2011), Anthony Davis (2017), and Curry (2025); Pettit and O'Neal did this multiple times. Kareem Abdul-Jabbar has the distinction of playing in the most All-Star Games (18) without winning the All-Star Game MVP, while Adrian Smith won the MVP in his only All-Star Game.

== Winners ==
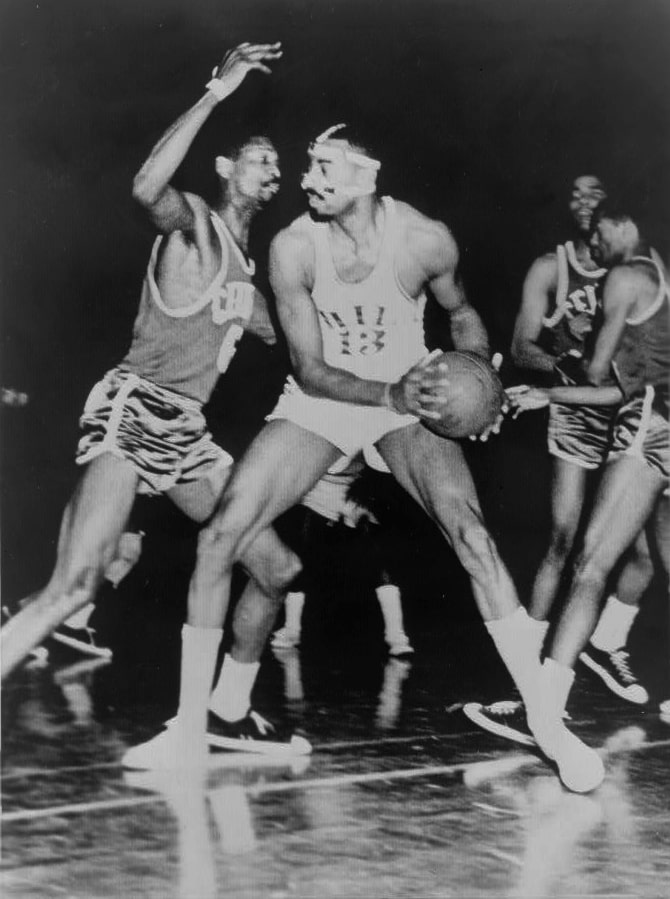
Hall-of-Famer Bill Russell (left) won the award in the 1963 NBA All-Star Game. Hall-of-Famer Wilt Chamberlain (center) won the award in the 1960 NBA All-Star Game.

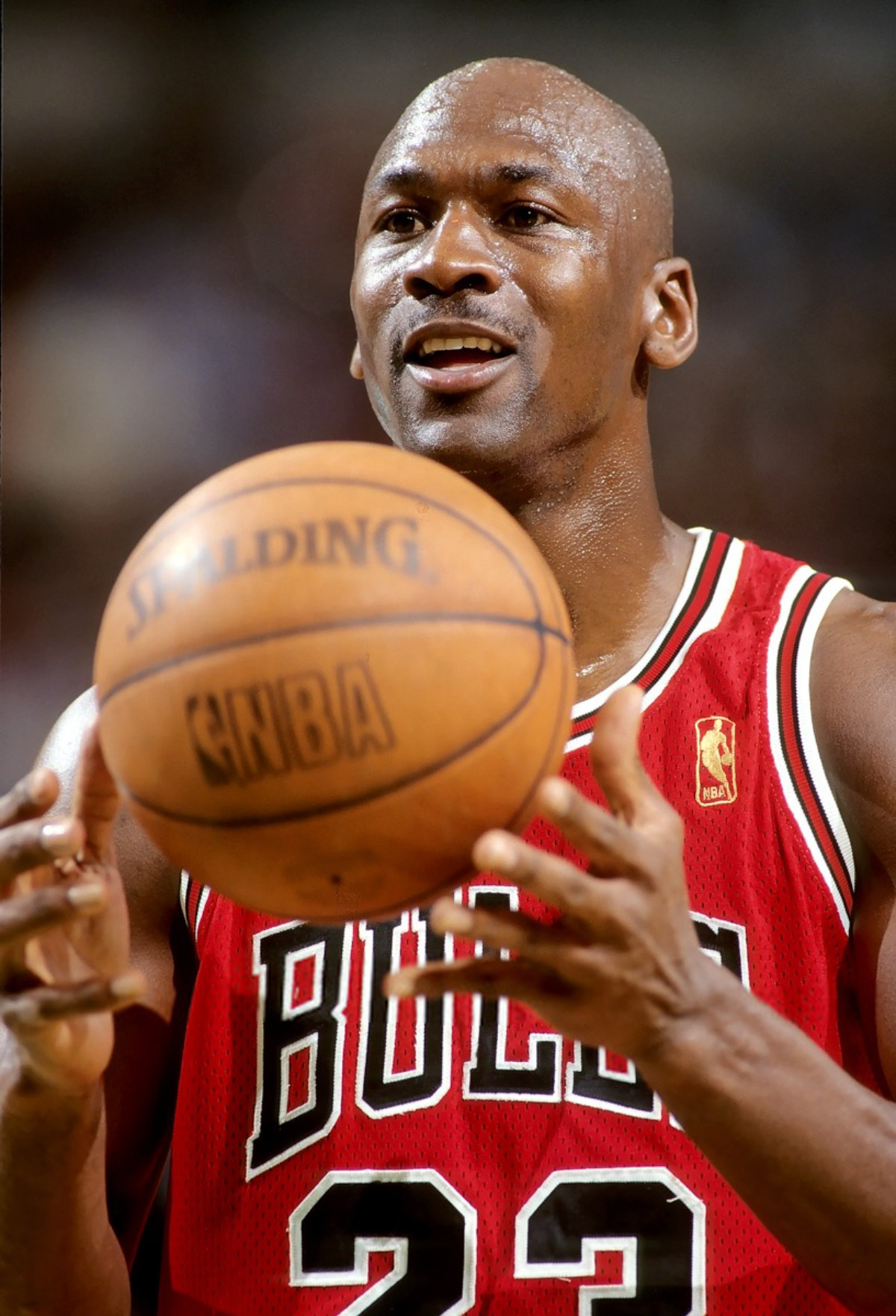
Hall-of-Famer Michael Jordan won the award three times in his career.

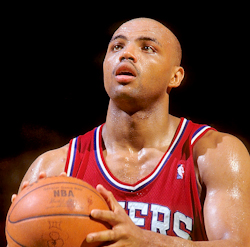
Hall-of-Famer Charles Barkley won the award in the 1991 NBA All-Star Game.

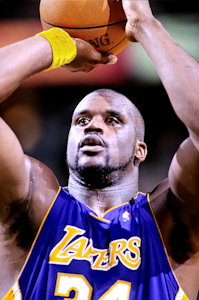
Hall-of-Famer Shaquille O'Neal has won the award three times in his career. He is also the oldest MVP ever, at 36 years and 346 days old.

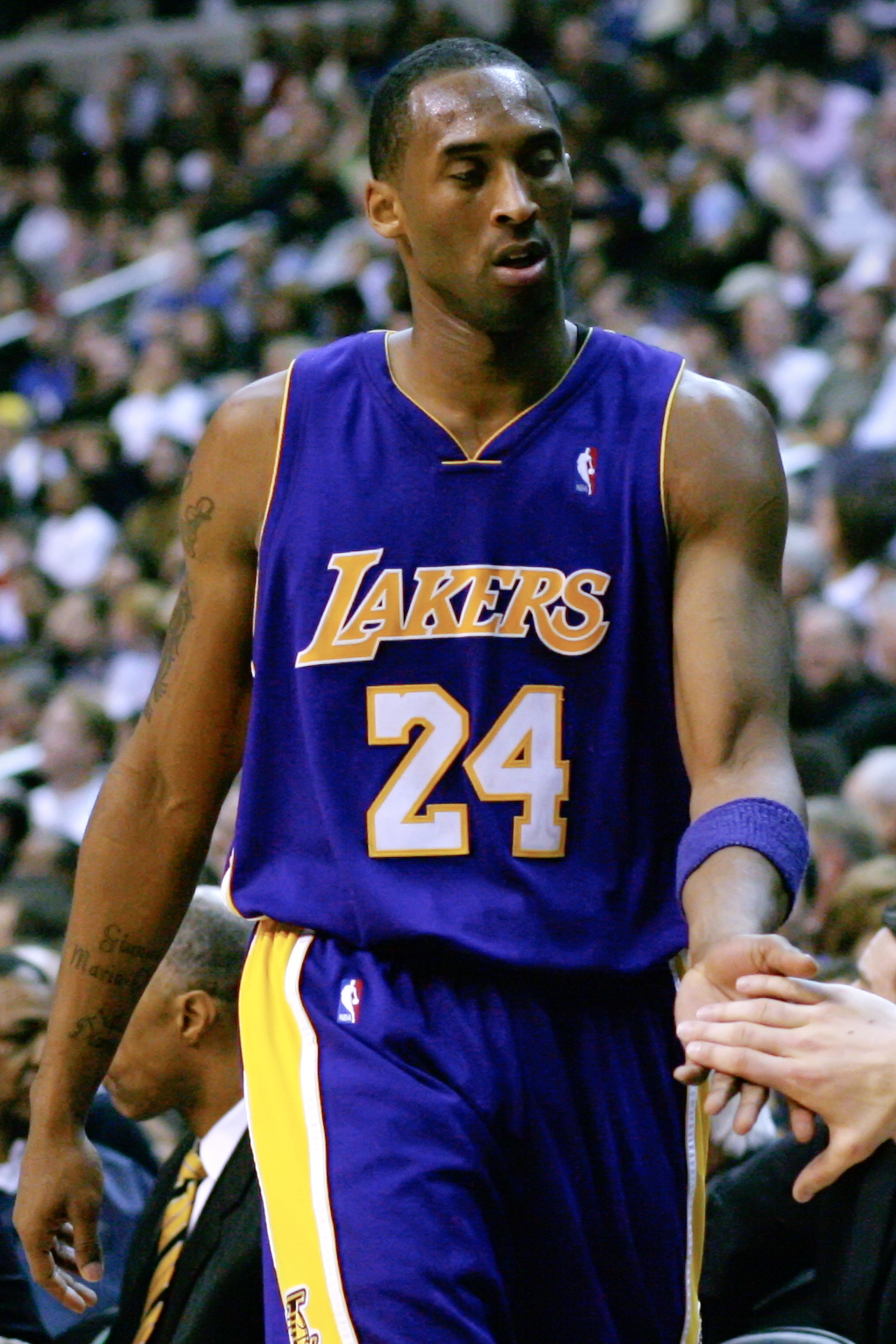
Hall-of-Famer Kobe Bryant won the award a record four times in his career, a feat he shares with Bob Pettit. The award was renamed after him following his death in 2020.

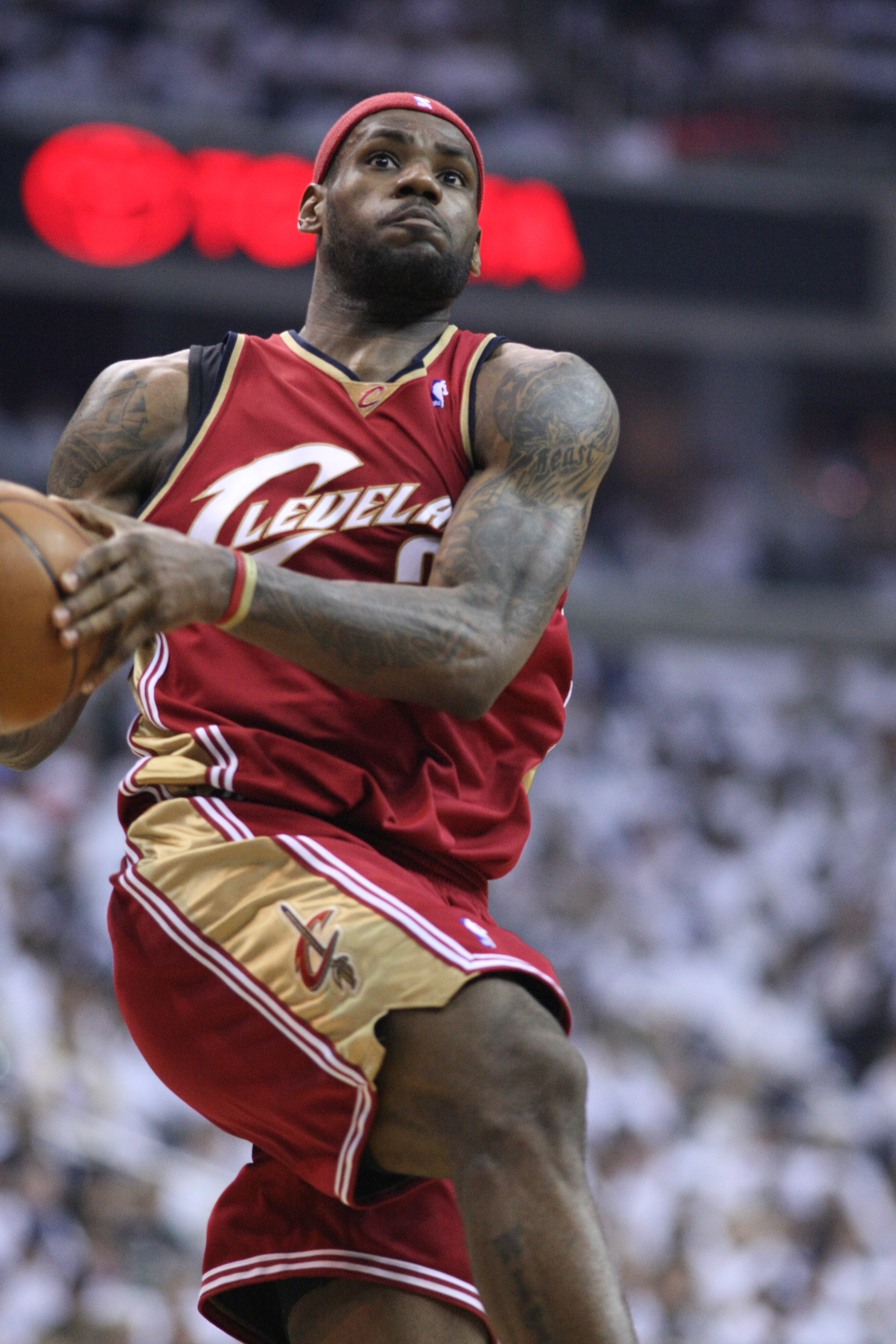
LeBron James was the youngest player to ever win the award at 21 years and 51 days old and is the all-time leader in points scored in NBA All-Star Game history.

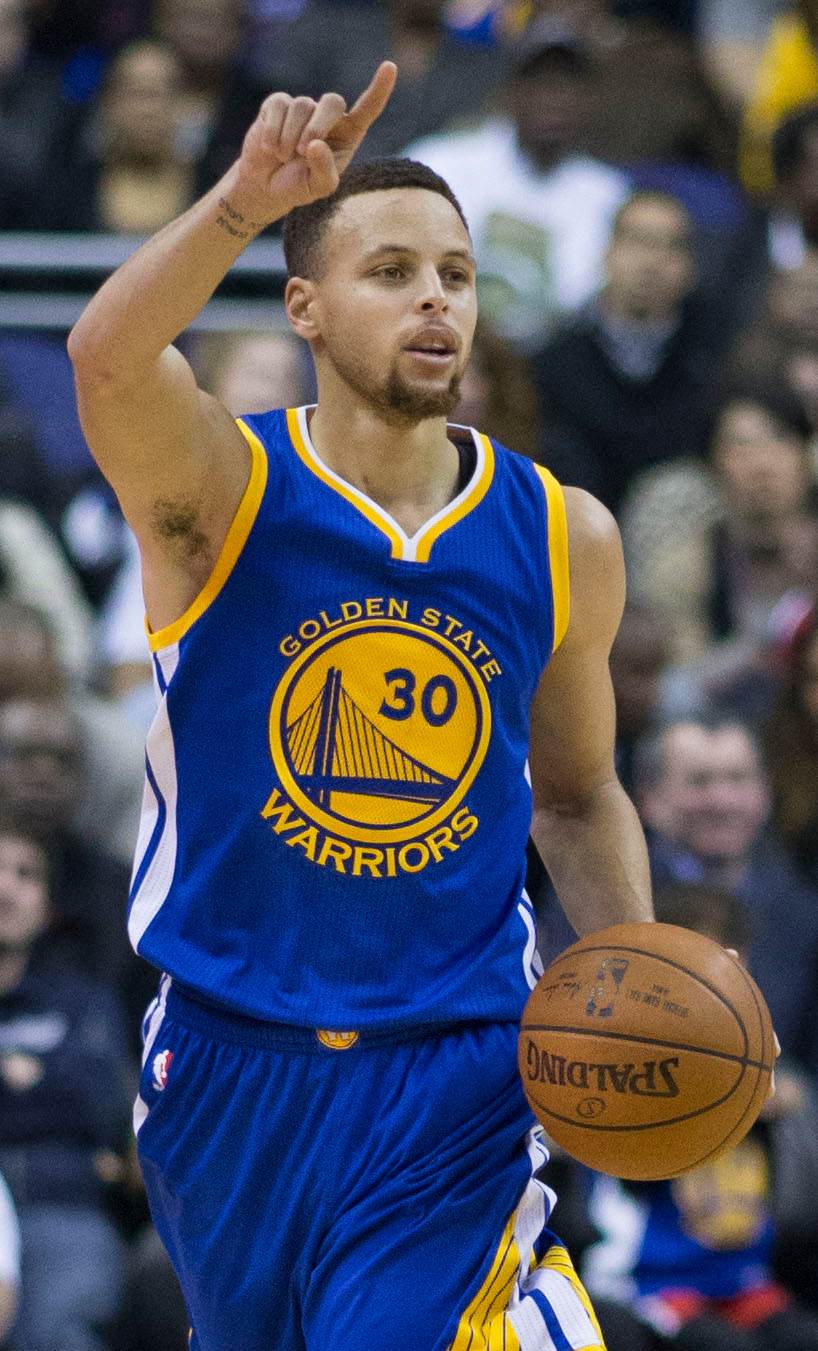
Stephen Curry has won the award two times in his career and is the all-time leader in three-point field goals made in NBA All-Star Game history.

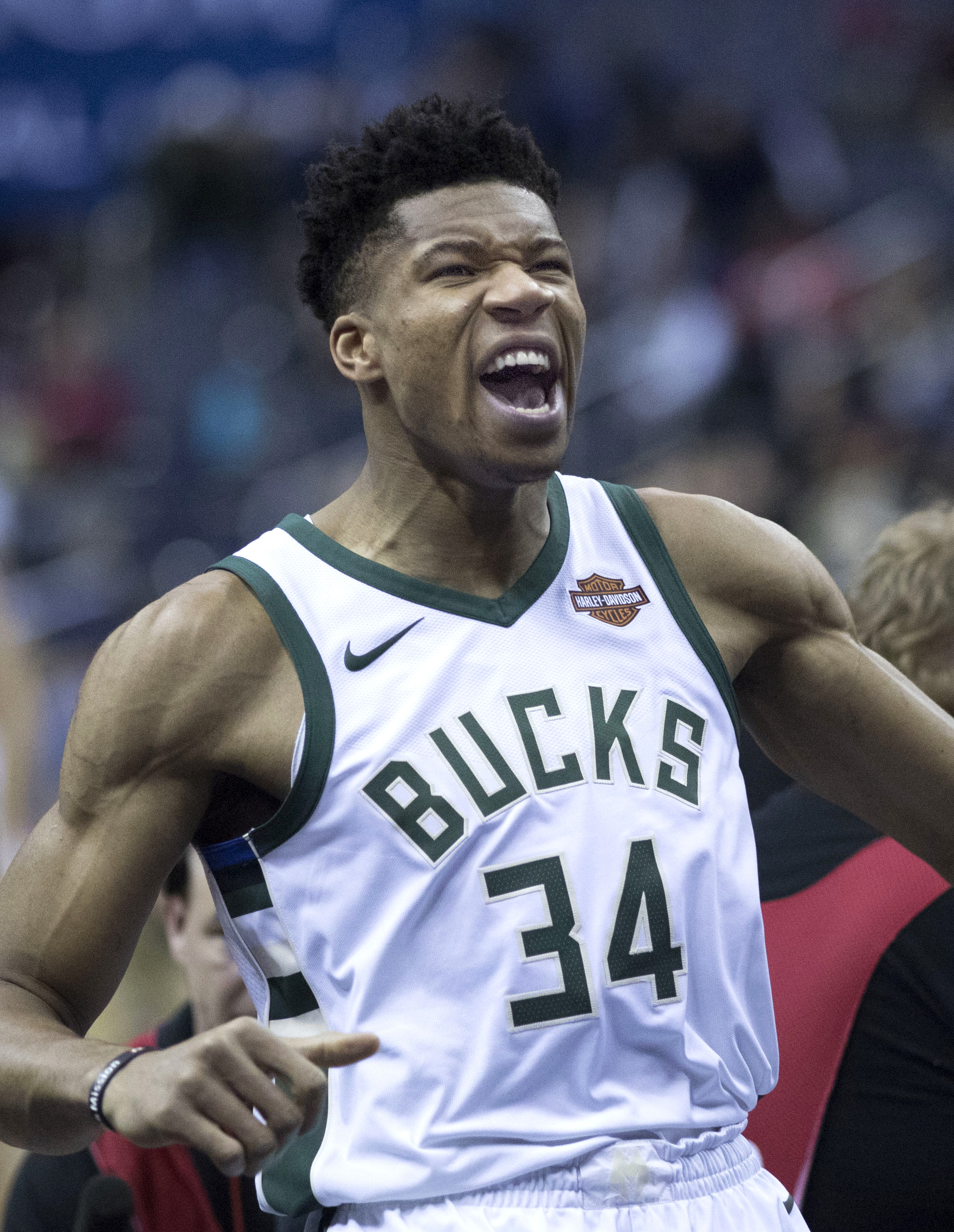
Giannis Antetokounmpo is the first and only non-American and Greek player to win the award.

^	Denotes player who is still active in the NBA
*	Elected to the Naismith Memorial Basketball Hall of Fame
†	Not yet eligible for Hall of Fame consideration
Player (#)	Denotes the number of times the player has been awarded the MVP award
Team (#)	Denotes the number of times a player from this team has won

Season	Player	Position	Nationality	Team
1951	Ed Macauley*	Center/forward	United States	Boston Celtics
1952	Paul Arizin*	Forward/guard	United States	Philadelphia Warriors
1953	George Mikan*	Center	United States	Minneapolis Lakers
1954	Bob Cousy*	Guard	United States	Boston Celtics (2)
1955	Bill Sharman*	Guard	United States	Boston Celtics (3)
1956	Bob Pettit*	Forward/center	United States	St. Louis Hawks
1957	Bob Cousy* (2)	Guard	United States	Boston Celtics (4)
1958	Bob Pettit* (2)	Forward/center	United States	St. Louis Hawks (2)
1959 (Note: Denotes All-Star Games in which joint winners were named)	Elgin Baylor*	Forward	United States	Minneapolis Lakers (2)
1959	Bob Pettit* (3)	Forward/center	United States	St. Louis Hawks (3)
1960	Wilt Chamberlain*	Center	United States	Philadelphia Warriors (2)
1961	Oscar Robertson*	Guard	United States	Cincinnati Royals
1962	Bob Pettit* (4)	Forward/center	United States	St. Louis Hawks (4)
1963	Bill Russell*	Center	United States	Boston Celtics (5)
1964	Oscar Robertson* (2)	Guard	United States	Cincinnati Royals (2)
1965	Jerry Lucas*	Forward/center	United States	Cincinnati Royals (3)
1966	Adrian Smith	Guard	United States	Cincinnati Royals (4)
1967	Rick Barry*	Forward	United States	San Francisco Warriors (3)
1968	Hal Greer*	Guard/forward	United States	Philadelphia 76ers
1969	Oscar Robertson* (3)	Guard	United States	Cincinnati Royals (5)
1970	Willis Reed*	Center/forward	United States	New York Knicks
1971	Lenny Wilkens*	Guard	United States	Seattle SuperSonics
1972	Jerry West*	Guard	United States	Los Angeles Lakers (3)
1973	Dave Cowens*	Center/forward	United States	Boston Celtics (6)
1974	Bob Lanier*	Center	United States	Detroit Pistons
1975	Walt Frazier*	Guard	United States	New York Knicks (2)
1976	Dave Bing*	Guard	United States	Washington Bullets
1977	Julius Erving*	Forward	United States	Philadelphia 76ers (2)
1978	Randy Smith	Guard/forward	United States	Buffalo Braves
1979	David Thompson*	Guard/forward	United States	Denver Nuggets
1980	George Gervin*	Guard/forward	United States	San Antonio Spurs
1981	Nate Archibald*	Guard	United States	Boston Celtics (7)
1982	Larry Bird*	Forward	United States	Boston Celtics (8)
1983	Julius Erving* (2)	Forward	United States	Philadelphia 76ers (3)
1984	Isiah Thomas*	Guard	United States	Detroit Pistons (2)
1985	Ralph Sampson*	Center/forward	United States	Houston Rockets
1986	Isiah Thomas* (2)	Guard	United States	Detroit Pistons (3)
1987	Tom Chambers	Forward/center	United States	Seattle SuperSonics (2)
1988	Michael Jordan*	Guard	United States	Chicago Bulls
1989	Karl Malone*	Forward	United States	Utah Jazz
1990	Magic Johnson*	Guard	United States	Los Angeles Lakers (4)
1991	Charles Barkley*	Forward	United States	Philadelphia 76ers (4)
1992	Magic Johnson* (2)	Guard	United States	Los Angeles Lakers (5)
1993	John Stockton*	Guard	United States	Utah Jazz (2)
1993	Karl Malone* (2)	Forward	United States	Utah Jazz (3)
1994	Scottie Pippen*	Forward	United States	Chicago Bulls (2)
1995	Mitch Richmond*	Guard	United States	Sacramento Kings (6)
1996	Michael Jordan* (2)	Guard	United States	Chicago Bulls (3)
1997	Glen Rice	Forward	United States	Charlotte Hornets
1998	Michael Jordan* (3)	Guard	United States	Chicago Bulls (4)
1999	Not awarded as the game was canceled due to the league's lockout.			
2000	Shaquille O'Neal*	Center	United States	Los Angeles Lakers (6)
2000	Tim Duncan*	Forward/center	United States (Note: Because Tim Duncan is a United States citizen by birth, as are all natives of the U.S. Virgin Islands, he was able to play for the U.S. internationally.)	San Antonio Spurs (2)
2001	Allen Iverson*	Guard	United States	Philadelphia 76ers (5)
2002	Kobe Bryant*	Guard	United States	Los Angeles Lakers (7)
2003	Kevin Garnett*	Forward/center	United States	Minnesota Timberwolves
2004	Shaquille O'Neal* (2)	Center	United States	Los Angeles Lakers (8)
2005	Allen Iverson* (2)	Guard	United States	Philadelphia 76ers (6)
2006	LeBron James^ (Note: James, at 21 years and 51 days old, is the youngest All-Star Game MVP in NBA history.)	Forward	United States	Cleveland Cavaliers
2007	Kobe Bryant* (2)	Guard	United States	Los Angeles Lakers (9)
2008	LeBron James^ (2)	Forward	United States	Cleveland Cavaliers (2)
2009	Kobe Bryant* (3)	Guard	United States	Los Angeles Lakers (10)
2009	Shaquille O'Neal* (3) (Note: O'Neal, at 36 years and 346 days old, is the oldest All-Star Game MVP in NBA history.)	Center	United States	Phoenix Suns
2010	Dwyane Wade*	Guard	United States	Miami Heat
2011	Kobe Bryant* (4)	Guard	United States	Los Angeles Lakers (11)
2012	Kevin Durant^	Forward	United States	Oklahoma City Thunder (3)
2013	Chris Paul^{†}	Guard	United States	Los Angeles Clippers (2)
2014	Kyrie Irving^	Guard	United States	Cleveland Cavaliers (3)
2015	Russell Westbrook^{†}	Guard	United States	Oklahoma City Thunder (4)
2016	Russell Westbrook^{†} (2)	Guard	United States	Oklahoma City Thunder (5)
2017	Anthony Davis^	Forward/center	United States	New Orleans Pelicans
2018	LeBron James^ (3)	Forward	United States	Cleveland Cavaliers (4)
2019	Kevin Durant^ (2)	Forward	United States	Golden State Warriors (4)
2020	Kawhi Leonard^	Forward	United States	Los Angeles Clippers (3)
2021	Giannis Antetokounmpo^	Forward	Greece	Milwaukee Bucks
2022	Stephen Curry^	Guard	United States	Golden State Warriors (5)
2023	Jayson Tatum^	Forward	United States	Boston Celtics (9)
2024	Damian Lillard^	Guard	United States	Milwaukee Bucks (2)
2025	Stephen Curry^ (2)	Guard	United States	Golden State Warriors (6)
2026	Anthony Edwards^	Guard	United States	Minnesota Timberwolves (2)

== Multi-time winners ==
Awards	Player	Team(s)	Years
4	(United States) Bob Pettit	St. Louis Hawks	1956, 1958, 1959, 1962
4	(United States) Kobe Bryant	Los Angeles Lakers	2002, 2007, 2009, 2011
3	(United States) Oscar Robertson	Cincinnati Royals	1961, 1964, 1969
3	(United States) Michael Jordan	Chicago Bulls	1988, 1996, 1998
3	(United States) Shaquille O'Neal	Los Angeles Lakers (2), Phoenix Suns (1)	2000, 2004, 2009
3	(United States) LeBron James	Cleveland Cavaliers	2006, 2008, 2018
2	(United States) Bob Cousy	Boston Celtics	1954, 1957
2	(United States) Julius Erving	Philadelphia 76ers	1977, 1983
2	(United States) Isiah Thomas	Detroit Pistons	1984, 1986
2	(United States) Karl Malone	Utah Jazz	1989, 1993
2	(United States) Magic Johnson	Los Angeles Lakers	1990, 1992
2	(United States) Allen Iverson	Philadelphia 76ers	2001, 2005
2	(United States) Russell Westbrook	Oklahoma City Thunder	2015, 2016
2	(United States) Kevin Durant	Oklahoma City Thunder (1), Golden State Warriors (1)	2012, 2019
2	(United States) Stephen Curry	Golden State Warriors	2022, 2025

== Teams ==
Awards	Teams	Years
11	Los Angeles Lakers / Minneapolis Lakers	1953, 1959, 1972, 1990, 1992, 2000, 2002, 2004, 2007, 2009, 2011
9	Boston Celtics	1951, 1954, 1955, 1957, 1963, 1973, 1981, 1982, 2023
6	Philadelphia 76ers	1968, 1977, 1983, 1991, 2001, 2005
6	Sacramento Kings / Cincinnati Royals	1961, 1964, 1965, 1966, 1969, 1995
6	Golden State Warriors / San Francisco Warriors / Philadelphia Warriors	1952, 1960, 1967, 2019, 2022, 2025
5	Oklahoma City Thunder / Seattle SuperSonics	1971, 1987, 2012, 2015, 2016
4	Chicago Bulls	1988, 1994, 1996, 1998
4	Cleveland Cavaliers	2006, 2008, 2014, 2018
4	Atlanta Hawks / St. Louis Hawks	1956, 1958, 1959, 1962
3	Los Angeles Clippers / Buffalo Braves	1978, 2013, 2020
3	Detroit Pistons	1974, 1984, 1986
2
2	Milwaukee Bucks	2021, 2024
2	Minnesota Timberwolves	2003, 2026
2	New York Knicks	1970, 1975
2	San Antonio Spurs	1980, 2000
2	Utah Jazz	1989, 1993
1	Charlotte Hornets	1997
1	Denver Nuggets	1979
1	Houston Rockets	1985
1	Miami Heat	2010
1	New Orleans Pelicans	2017
1	Phoenix Suns	2009
1	Washington Wizards / Washington Bullets	1976
0	Indiana Pacers	None
0	Brooklyn Nets	None
0	Dallas Mavericks	None
0	Portland Trail Blazers	None
0	Memphis Grizzlies	None
0	Toronto Raptors	None
0	Orlando Magic	None

== See also ==
- Bill Russell NBA Finals Most Valuable Player Award
- List of NBA All-Stars
- List of NBA All-Star vote leaders
- NBA Conference Finals Most Valuable Player Award
- NBA Most Valuable Player Award
