= Tommy Nuñez =

American basketball referee (1938–2026)

Tommy Núñéz (September 10, 1938 – April 24, 2026) was an American NBA basketball referee who was the founder of the Tommy Núñez foundation. He was the father of former NBA referee Tommy Núñez Jr.

== Biography ==
Nuñez was born in Santa Maria, California, on September 10, 1938, and was of Mexican American descent. In 1972 he was hired by the NBA and became the first Hispanic to referee in any major sport. After 30 years of reffing in the NBA, Tommy retired in 2002. Since retiring he put all his time and energy into speaking to kids from coast to coast, organizing summer sports camps, youth programs or directing his National Hispanic Basketball tournament.

Nuñez died on April 24, 2026, at the age of 87.
