= 1986 NBA All-Star Game =

Exhibition basketball game

	1	2	3	4	Total
East	34	35	31	39	139
West	36	30	36	30	132
- Date: February 9, 1986
- Arena: Reunion Arena
- City: Dallas
- MVP: Isiah Thomas
- National anthem: B.J. Thomas
- Attendance: 16,573
- Network: CBS (All-Star Game); TBS (All-Star Saturday)
- Announcers: Dick Stockton and Tom Heinsohn; Bob Neal and Rick Barry (All-Star Saturday)

NBA All-Star Game
< 1985	1987 >

The 36th Annual NBA All-Star Game was an exhibition basketball game that was played on February 9, 1986, at Reunion Arena in Dallas, the home of the Dallas Mavericks. It was the first NBA All-Star Game to be held in Dallas. The Eastern All-Stars won the game 139–132. The most valuable player was Isiah Thomas of the Detroit Pistons, who recorded 30 points, 10 assists and five steals.

== Coaches ==
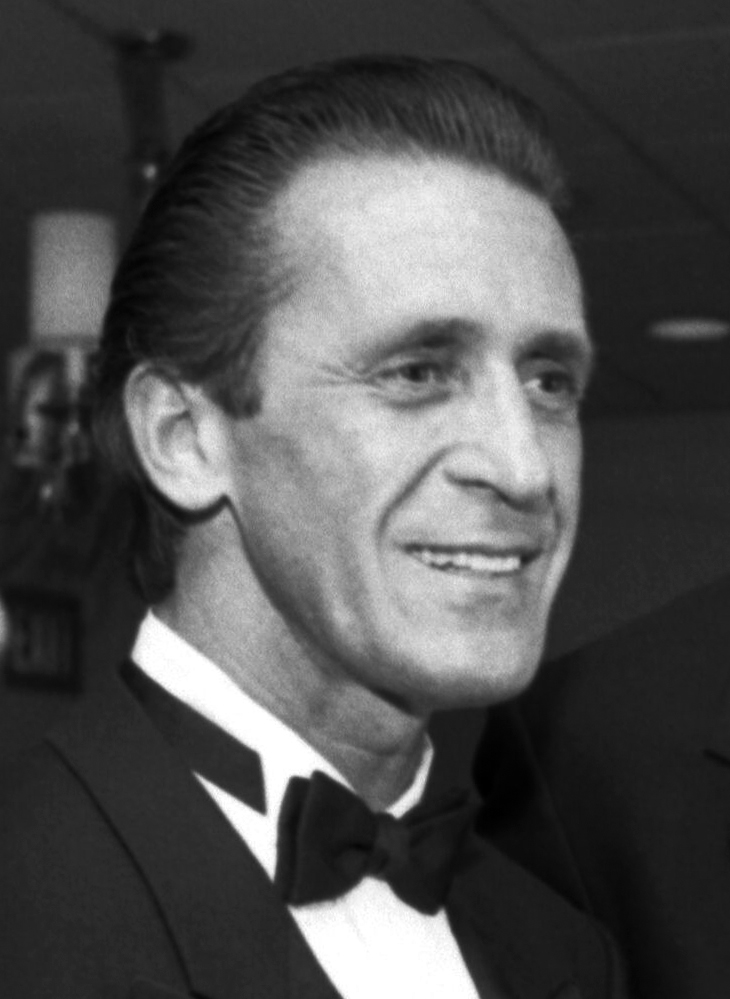
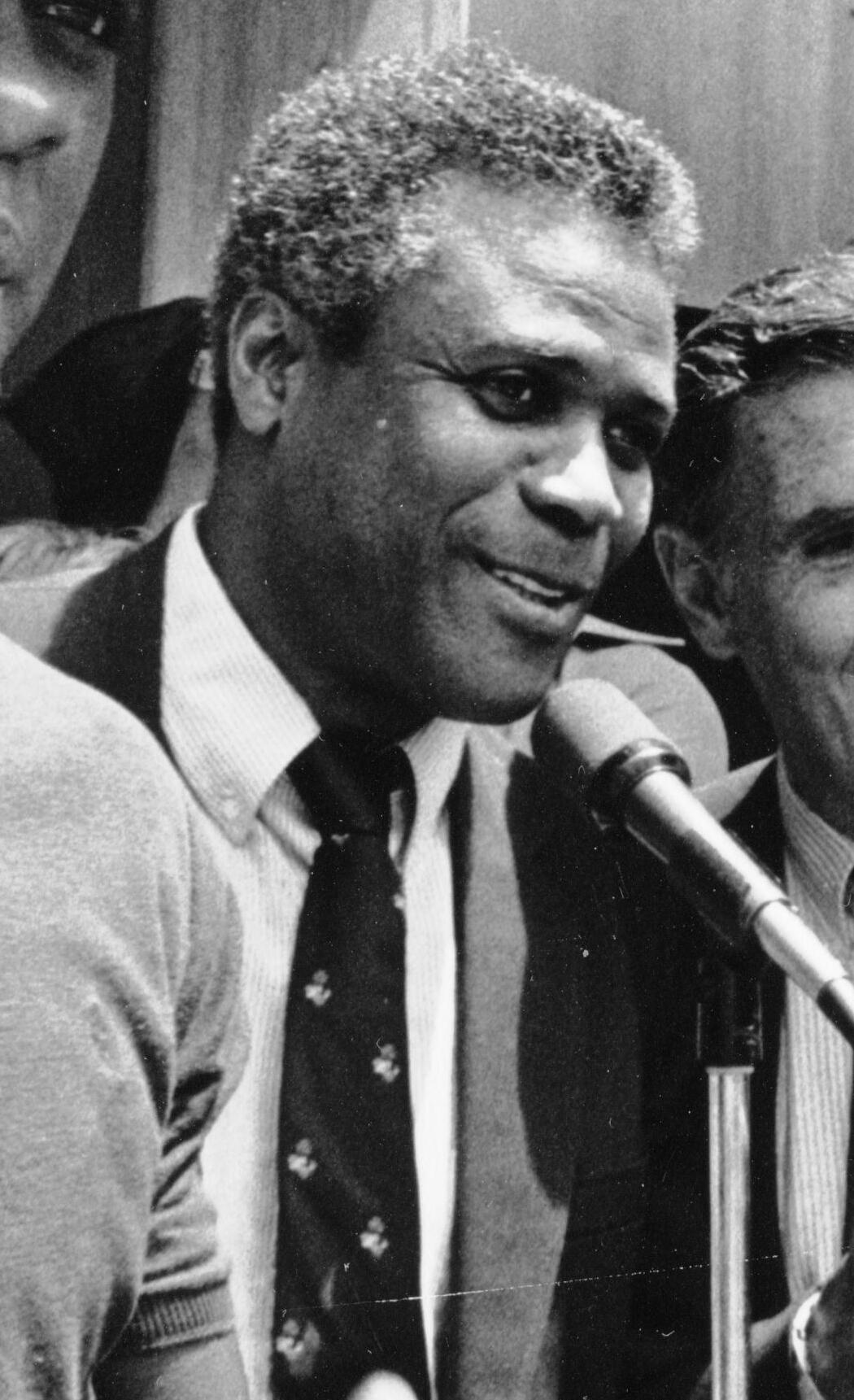
Pat Riley and K.C. Jones were selected as the West and East head coach, respectively.

K. C. Jones, head coach of the Eastern Conference leader Boston Celtics, coached the East team. Pat Riley, head coach of the Western Conference leader Los Angeles Lakers, coached the West team. This is the second straight game that features both Riley and Jones as coaches.

== Rosters ==
Eastern Conference All-Stars
Pos.	Player	Team	Appearance
Coach
HC	K.C. Jones	Boston Celtics	4th
Starters
PG	Isiah Thomas	Detroit Pistons	5th
SG	Michael Jordan^{DNP}	Chicago Bulls	2nd
SF	Julius Erving	Philadelphia 76ers	10th
PF	Larry Bird	Boston Celtics	7th
C	Moses Malone	Philadelphia 76ers	9th
Reserves
PF	Buck Williams	New Jersey Nets	3rd
PF	Kevin McHale	Boston Celtics	2nd
SF	Dominique Wilkins	Atlanta Hawks	1st
PG	Maurice Cheeks	Philadelphia 76ers	2nd
C	Patrick Ewing^{DNP}	New York Knicks	1st
SG	Jeff Malone	Washington Bullets	1st
C	Robert Parish	Boston Celtics	6th
SG	Sidney Moncrief^{ST}	Milwaukee Bucks	5th

Western Conference All-Stars
Pos.	Player	Team	Appearance
Coach
HC	Pat Riley	Los Angeles Lakers	5th
Starters
PG	Magic Johnson	Los Angeles Lakers	6th
SG	Alvin Robertson	San Antonio Spurs	1st
SF	James Worthy	Los Angeles Lakers	1st
PF	Ralph Sampson	Houston Rockets	3rd
C	Kareem Abdul-Jabbar	Los Angeles Lakers	16th
Reserves
SG	Rolando Blackman	Dallas Mavericks	2nd
SF/SG	Adrian Dantley	Utah Jazz	6th
SF	Alex English	Denver Nuggets	5th
SG	Clyde Drexler	Portland Trail Blazers	1st
C	Akeem Olajuwon	Houston Rockets	2nd
C	Artis Gilmore	San Antonio Spurs	6th
SF/SG	Marques Johnson	Los Angeles Clippers	5th

- DNP Michael Jordan and Patrick Ewing were unable to participate due to injury. Jordan and Ewing weren't replaced by anyone.
- ST Sidney Moncrief to start in place of the injured Jordan.

== Score by periods ==
Score by periods:	1	2	3	4	Final
East	34	35	31	39	139
West	36	30	36	30	132

- Halftime: East, 69–66
- Third quarter: West, 102–100

== NBA All-Star Legends Classic ==
- This game featured the East from the likes of Pete Maravich, Gail Goodrich, Bailey Howell, John Havlicek, Tom Sanders, Dave Cowens, Walt Bellamy, Connie Hawkins and Bob Cousy.
- The west represents the likes of Zelmo Beaty, Calvin Murphy, Oscar Robertson, Elvin Hayes, Cazzie Russell, Randy Smith, Jack Marin, Nate Thurmond, Slater Martin and Tom Gola.

== Slam Dunk Contest ==
Indicates the champion

#	P	Player	Team	First Round				Semifinals				Finals		
#	P	Player	Team	1	2	3	T	1	2	3	T	1	2	T
1	G	Spud Webb	Atlanta Hawks	46	48	47	141	50	42	46	138	50	50	100
2	F	Dominique Wilkins	Atlanta Hawks	Bye (Note: Dominique Wilkins received a first-round bye as he was the previous year's champion.)			—	46	47	45	138	50	48	98
3	G	Terence Stansbury	Indiana Pacers	34	47	48	129 (Note: Terence Stansbury defeated Kersey in a dunk-off to break their tie.)	44	39	49	132	DNQ		
4	G/F	Gerald Wilkins	New York Knicks	44	50	39	133	37	25	25	87	DNQ		
5	F	Jerome Kersey	Portland Trail Blazers	39	43	47	129	DNQ						
6	F	Paul Pressey	Milwaukee Bucks	44	35	37	116	DNQ						
7	F	Roy Hinson	Cleveland Cavaliers	35	39	38	112	DNQ						
8	F	Terry Tyler	Sacramento Kings	37	36	37	110	DNQ						
