= 1988 NBA All-Star Game =

Exhibition basketball game

	1	2	3	4	Total
West	32	22	35	44	133
East	27	33	39	39	138
- Date: February 7, 1988
- Arena: Chicago Stadium
- City: Chicago
- MVP: Michael Jordan (East)
- National anthem: Al Jarreau
- Attendance: 18,403
- Network: CBS (All-Star Game); TBS (All-Star Saturday)
- Announcers: Dick Stockton and Billy Cunningham; Bob Neal, Skip Caray, Rick Barry and Steve Jones (All-Star Saturday)

NBA All-Star Game
< 1987	1989 >

The 38th National Basketball Association All-Star Game was an exhibition basketball game that was played on February 7, 1988, at Chicago Stadium in Chicago, home of the Chicago Bulls. It was the 38th edition of the game. It was the second NBA All-Star Game to be held in Chicago, after the 1973 game. The East won the game 138–133. Michael Jordan was named the NBA All-Star Game Most Valuable Player (MVP) after scoring a game-high 40 points.

== Summary ==
The Eastern Conference team featured Michael Jordan and Dominique Wilkins, who had faced each other the preceding night in the Slam Dunk contest, along with Boston Celtics trio Larry Bird, Danny Ainge and Kevin McHale, plus Patrick Ewing of the New York Knicks, Maurice Cheeks and Charles Barkley of the Philadelphia 76ers, Moses Malone of the Washington Bullets, Isiah Thomas of the Detroit Pistons, Doc Rivers of the Atlanta Hawks, and Brad Daugherty of the Cleveland Cavaliers.

The Western Conference team was led by Magic Johnson of the Los Angeles Lakers, Clyde Drexler of the Portland Trail Blazers, the Utah Jazz's power forward Karl Malone and the Houston Rockets' center Akeem Olajuwon. Joining them were James Worthy and Kareem Abdul-Jabbar of the Lakers, Fat Lever and Alex English of the Denver Nuggets, Xavier McDaniel of the Seattle SuperSonics, Alvin Robertson of the San Antonio Spurs and Mark Aguirre and James Donaldson of the Dallas Mavericks. In this game, Abdul-Jabbar would become the all-time leading scorer in NBA All-Star Game history, a distinction he held for 15 years.

The Eastern Conference was coached by Mike Fratello of the Hawks, and the Western Conference by Pat Riley of the Lakers. Both the Hawks and Lakers led their respective conferences as of January 24.

The game was telecast by CBS Sports, with Dick Stockton and Billy Cunningham commentating, and Pat O'Brien and Lesley Visser reporting from the sidelines. On radio, ABC Radio broadcast their fourth consecutive All-Star game, with Lakers announcer Chick Hearn working alongside Celtics announcer Johnny Most, and the two trading roles on play-by-play and color analysis. ABC's regular NBA announcer Fred Manfra served as a sideline reporter.

== Rosters ==
Eastern Conference All-Stars
Pos.	Player	Team	Appearance
Starters
G	Isiah Thomas	Detroit Pistons	7th
G	Michael Jordan	Chicago Bulls	4th
F	Dominique Wilkins	Atlanta Hawks	3rd
F	Larry Bird	Boston Celtics	9th
C	Moses Malone	Washington Bullets	11th
Reserves
G	Danny Ainge	Boston Celtics	1st
C	Patrick Ewing	New York Knicks	2nd
G	Doc Rivers	Atlanta Hawks	1st
C	Brad Daugherty	Cleveland Cavaliers	1st
F	Charles Barkley	Philadelphia 76ers	2nd
F	Kevin McHale	Boston Celtics	4th
G	Maurice Cheeks	Philadelphia 76ers	4th
Head coach: Mike Fratello (Atlanta Hawks)

Western Conference All-Stars
Pos.	Player	Team	Appearance
Starters
G	Magic Johnson	Los Angeles Lakers	8th
G	Fat Lever	Denver Nuggets	1st
F	Alex English	Denver Nuggets	7th
F	Karl Malone	Utah Jazz	1st
C	Akeem Olajuwon	Houston Rockets	4th
Reserves
G	Clyde Drexler	Portland Trail Blazers	2nd
C	Kareem Abdul-Jabbar	Los Angeles Lakers	18th
F	James Worthy	Los Angeles Lakers	3rd
F	Xavier McDaniel	Seattle SuperSonics	1st
F	Mark Aguirre	Dallas Mavericks	3rd
G	Alvin Robertson	San Antonio Spurs	3rd
C	James Donaldson	Dallas Mavericks	1st
C	Steve Johnson^{DNP}	Portland Trail Blazers	1st
Head coach: Pat Riley (Los Angeles Lakers)

^DNPSteve Johnson was unable to play due to injury. James Donaldson was selected as his replacement.

== Score by periods ==
Score by periods:	1	2	3	4	Final
East	27	33	39	39	138
West	32	22	35	44	133

- Halftime: East, 60–54
- Third quarter: East, 99–89
- Officials: Darell Garretson and Jake O'Donnell
- Attendance: 18,403

== NBA All-Star Legends Classic ==
- This game featured the East including the likes of Randy Smith, Dave Cowens, Johnny Green, Calvin Murphy, John Havlicek, Gail Goodrich, Jamaal Wilkes, Oscar Robertson, Clifford Ray and Tom Sanders
- On the West side it featured the likes of Rick Barry, Doug Collins, Dave Bing, Jerry Sloan, Zelmo Beaty, Bailey Howell, Tom Hawkins, Nate Thurmond, Dolph Schayes and Norm Van Lier.

== All-Star Weekend ==
=== Slam Dunk Contest ===
Ron Harper (Cleveland) was to participate but withdrew due to injury.

Player	First round	Semifinals	Finals
Michael Jordan (Chicago)	94 (47+47)	145 (50+48+47)	147 (50+47+50)
Dominique Wilkins (Atlanta)	96 (49+47)	143 (49+47+47)	145 (50+50+45)
Clyde Drexler (Portland)	88 (44+44)	133 (45+42+46)	
Otis Smith (Golden State)	87 (40+47)	109 (45+22+42)	
Jerome Kersey (Portland)	79 (41+38)		
Greg Anderson (San Antonio)	76 (42+34)		
Spud Webb (Atlanta)	52 (34+18)		
