= 1990 NBA All-Star Game =

Exhibition basketball game

| | 1 | 2 | 3 | 4 | Total |
|---|---|---|---|---|---|
| West | 23 | 29 | 31 | 30 | 113 |
| East | 40 | 25 | 35 | 30 | 130 |
- Date: February 11, 1990
- Arena: Miami Arena
- City: Miami
- MVP: Magic Johnson
- National anthem: Branford Marsalis
- Attendance: 14,810
- Network: CBS (All-Star Game); TNT (All-Star Saturday)
- Announcers: Dick Stockton and Hubie Brown; Bob Neal, Rick Barry and Doug Collins (All-Star Saturday)

NBA All-Star Game
| < 1989 | 1991 > |

The 40th National Basketball Association All-Star Game was played on February 11, 1990, at Miami Arena in Miami, the home of the Miami Heat. Magic Johnson was named the game's MVP, as well as the leading scorer with 22 points.

The Eastern Conference All-Star Starters as selected by fan voting were Michael Jordan, Isiah Thomas, Charles Barkley, Larry Bird, and Patrick Ewing. The reserves consisted of Celtics duo Kevin McHale and Robert Parish, as well as Dominique Wilkins of the Atlanta Hawks. The reserves were rounded out by four first time all-stars; Scottie Pippen of the Chicago Bulls, Indiana Pacers guard Reggie Miller, and Detroit Piston teammates Joe Dumars and Dennis Rodman.

The Western Conference All-Star Starters as selected by fan voting were John Stockton, Magic Johnson, James Worthy, A.C. Green, and Akeem Olajuwon. The reserves consisted of Clyde Drexler from the Blazers, Phoenix Suns teammates Tom Chambers and Kevin Johnson, as well as Chris Mullin of the Golden State Warriors. The team also included San Antonio Spurs center David Robinson, Denver Nuggets guard Lafayette Lever and Utah Jazz power forward Karl Malone. Rolando Blackman was later named to the team as injury replacement for Karl Malone. A.C. Green, David Robinson, and Kevin Johnson were all making their first All-Star Game appearance

The game featured 11 out of 12 players that would go on to make the 1992 Dream Team as well as coach Chuck Daly.

Magic Johnson was the game MVP as well as leading scorer with 22 points. Akeem Olajuwon led the way with a game high 16 rebounds, and Isiah Thomas had the most assists on the night with 9.

This was the last NBA All-Star Game broadcast by CBS before moving to NBC in the following year.

== Background ==
The Miami Arena in Miami was announced to host the All-Star Game on December 9, 1988, during the inaugural season of the Miami Heat. Miami emerged from an initial field of eleven cities that submitted bids in April 1988 to host either the 1990 or 1991 editions of the game. Following proposals in June, Miami advanced to a four-city finalist group. Miami Mayor Xavier Suarez unveiled the city's selection at Miami City Hall, noting that landing the event so quickly was both a surprise and a first for an expansion team in its inaugural season. Heat general manager Lewis Schaffel credited the selection with validating Miami's standing as a viable NBA market.

== Coaches ==
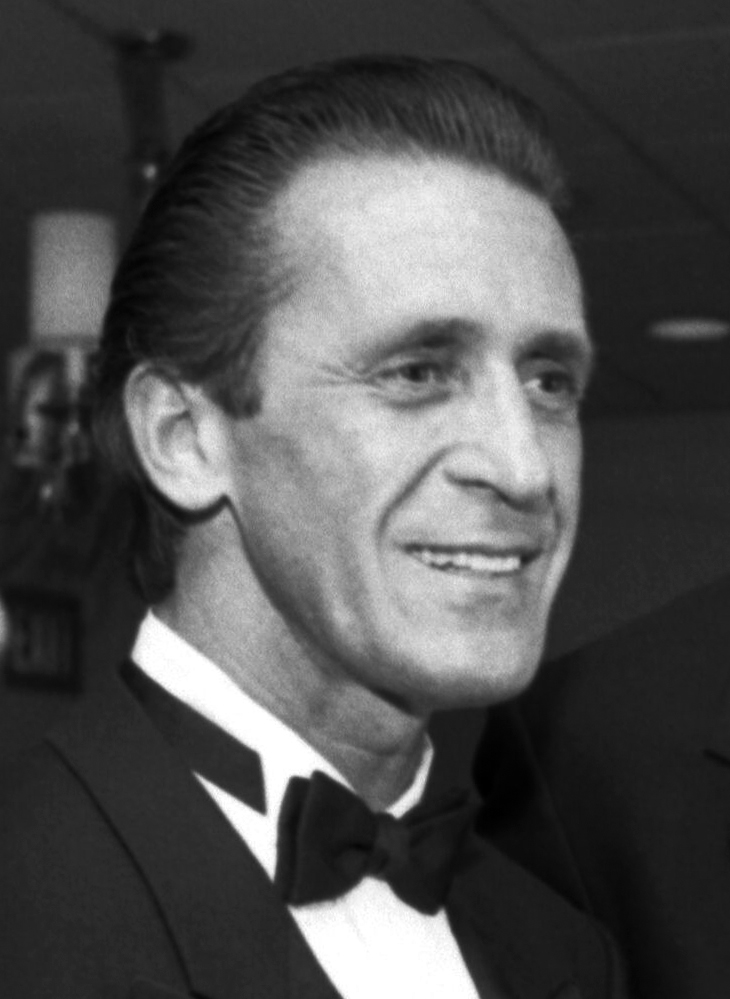
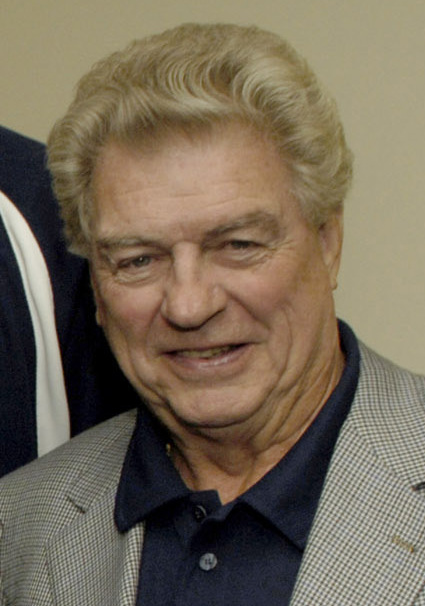
Pat Riley and Chuck Daly were selected as the West and East head coach, respectively.

Chuck Daly, head coach of the Eastern Conference leader Detroit Pistons, coached the Eastern All-Stars. Pat Riley, head coach of the Western Conference leader Los Angeles Lakers, coached the Western All-Stars. Both were determined by the best conference record at a pre-determined date mid-season before the All-Star Game (usually late January).

As a result of Riley's sixth straight appearance, the 1990 game was the last to allow a head coach to lead an All-Star team in consecutive seasons. The NBA implemented the "Pat Riley Rule" to ensure variety and prevent such dominance. This mandate disqualifies the previous year's coach from returning, even if their team currently leads the conference. In such cases, the honor passes to the coach of the team with the next-best record in the same conference, with tiebreakers favoring the coach who has either never coached the game or hasn't done so less recently.

== All-Star voting ==
All-Star Starters

Eastern Conference
| Pos. | Player | Votes |
|---|---|---|
| G | Isiah Thomas | 181,960 |
| G | Michael Jordan | 321,114 |
| F | Larry Bird | 248,837 |
| F | Charles Barkley | 182,639 |
| C | Patrick Ewing | 245,746 |

Western Conference
| Pos. | Player | Votes |
|---|---|---|
| G | Magic Johnson | 214,348 |
| G | John Stockton | 149,548 |
| F | James Worthy | 163,053 |
| F | A.C. Green | 160,788 |
| C | Akeem Olajuwon | 202,244 |

Eastern Conference voting

Guards
| Rank | Player | Votes |
|---|---|---|
| 1 | Michael Jordan | 321,114 |
| 2 | Isiah Thomas | 181,960 |
| 3 | Jeff Malone | 134,166 |
| 4 | Joe Dumars | 128,964 |
| 5 | Hersey Hawkins | 103,688 |
| 6 | Mark Price | 82,991 |
| 7 | Doc Rivers | 74,787 |
| 8 | John Battle | 59,217 |
| 9 | Reggie Miller | 57,616 |
| 10 | Reggie Lewis | 49,793 |

Forwards
| Rank | Player | Votes |
|---|---|---|
| 1 | Larry Bird | 248,837 |
| 2 | Charles Barkley | 182,639 |
| 3 | Dominique Wilkins | 132,994 |
| 4 | Mark Aguirre | 110,852 |
| 5 | Scottie Pippen | 106,717 |
| 6 | Kevin McHale | 94,718 |
| 7 | Bernard King | 88,550 |
| 8 | Dennis Rodman | 87,078 |
| 9 | Horace Grant | 81,393 |
| 10 | Rick Mahorn | 79,483 |

Centers
| Rank | Player | Votes |
|---|---|---|
| 1 | Patrick Ewing | 245,746 |
| 2 | Moses Malone | 134,849 |
| 3 | Bill Laimbeer | 126,604 |
| 4 | Robert Parish | 56,028 |
| 5 | Rik Smits | 51,693 |

Western Conference voting

Guards
| Rank | Player | Votes |
|---|---|---|
| 1 | Magic Johnson | 214,348 |
| 2 | John Stockton | 149,548 |
| 3 | Derek Harper | 146,986 |
| 4 | Clyde Drexler | 145,782 |
| 5 | Maurice Cheeks | 144,201 |
| 6 | Kevin Johnson | 78,812 |
| 7 | Dale Ellis | 66,198 |
| 8 | Pooh Richardson | 64,276 |
| 9 | Sleepy Floyd | 62,886 |
| 10 | Mitch Richmond | 60,704 |

Forwards
| Rank | Player | Votes |
|---|---|---|
| 1 | James Worthy | 163,053 |
| 2 | A.C. Green | 160,788 |
| 3 | Karl Malone | 159,562 |
| 4 | Xavier McDaniel | 158,759 |
| 5 | Kelly Tripucka | 77,832 |
| 6 | Chris Mullin | 72,817 |
| 7 | Derrick McKey | 67,430 |
| 8 | Thurl Bailey | 64,102 |
| 9 | Tom Chambers | 64,028 |
| 10 | Danny Manning | 58,593 |

Centers
| Rank | Player | Votes |
|---|---|---|
| 1 | Akeem Olajuwon | 202,244 |
| 2 | David Robinson | 119,301 |
| 3 | Mark Eaton | 99,591 |
| 4 | Steve Johnson | 65,111 |
| 5 | J.R. Reid | 62,897 |

Michael Jordan was the leading vote-getter overall. Magic Johnson received the most votes among Western Conference players.

== Rosters ==
Eastern Conference All-Stars
| Pos. | Player | Team | Appearance |
Starters
| G | Isiah Thomas | Detroit Pistons | 9th |
| G | Michael Jordan | Chicago Bulls | 6th |
| F | Larry Bird | Boston Celtics | 10th |
| F | Charles Barkley | Philadelphia 76ers | 4th |
| C | Patrick Ewing | New York Knicks | 4th |
Reserves
| C | Robert Parish | Boston Celtics | 8th |
| F | Kevin McHale | Boston Celtics | 6th |
| G | Joe Dumars | Detroit Pistons | 1st |
| F | Dominique Wilkins | Atlanta Hawks | 5th |
| G | Reggie Miller | Indiana Pacers | 1st |
| F | Scottie Pippen | Chicago Bulls | 1st |
| F | Dennis Rodman | Detroit Pistons | 1st |
Head coach: Chuck Daly (Detroit Pistons)

Western Conference All-Stars
| Pos. | Player | Team | Appearance |
Starters
| G | Magic Johnson | Los Angeles Lakers | 10th |
| G | John Stockton | Utah Jazz | 2nd |
| F | James Worthy | Los Angeles Lakers | 5th |
| F | A.C. Green | Los Angeles Lakers | 1st |
| C | Akeem Olajuwon | Houston Rockets | 6th |
Reserves
| C | David Robinson | San Antonio Spurs | 1st |
| G | Fat Lever | Denver Nuggets | 2nd |
| F | Tom Chambers | Phoenix Suns | 3rd |
| G | Rolando Blackman^{DNP} | Dallas Mavericks | 4th |
| F | Karl Malone^{DNP} | Utah Jazz | 3rd |
| G | Clyde Drexler | Portland Trail Blazers | 4th |
| F | Chris Mullin | Golden State Warriors | 2nd |
| G | Kevin Johnson | Phoenix Suns | 1st |
Head coach: Pat Riley (Los Angeles Lakers)

^DNPKarl Malone was unable to play due to injury. Rolando Blackman was selected as his replacement.

== Score by periods ==
| Score by periods: | 1 | 2 | 3 | 4 | Final |
| West | 23 | 29 | 31 | 30 | 113 |
| East | 40 | 25 | 35 | 30 | 130 |

- Halftime— East, 65–52
- Third Quarter— East, 100–83
- Officials: Earl Strom, Bill Oakes, and Paul Mihalak
- Attendance: 14,810

== NBA All-Star legends Game ==
- For the 7th straight year this contest featured stars from the East including Elvin Hayes, Wali Jones, Bobby Jones, Connie Hawkins, Cazzie Russell, Dave DeBusschere, Walt Hazzard, Zelmo Beaty and Archie Clark
- For the West this team featured Rick Barry, Calvin Murphy, Doug Collins, Fred Brown, Dave Bing, Jamaal Wilkes, Spencer Haywood, Bailey Howell, Clifford Ray, and Dave Cowens.
