= 1985 NBA All-Star Game =

Exhibition basketball game

| | 1 | 2 | 3 | 4 | Total |
|---|---|---|---|---|---|
| West | 40 | 28 | 29 | 43 | 140 |
| East | 35 | 33 | 24 | 37 | 129 |
- Date: February 10, 1985
- Arena: Hoosier Dome (Note: The game was originally scheduled to be held at the Market Square Arena, but was moved due to limited capacity.); Market Square Arena (All-Star Saturday)
- City: Indianapolis
- MVP: Ralph Sampson
- National anthem: United States Military Academy Cadet Glee Club
- Attendance: 43,146
- Network: CBS; TBS (All-Star Saturday)
- Announcers: Dick Stockton, Tom Heinsohn; Rick Barry, Bill Russell, John Andariese, Rod Hundley and Red Auerbach (All-Star Saturday)

NBA All-Star Game
| < 1984 | 1986 > |

The 35th Annual NBA All-Star Game was an exhibition basketball game played on February 10, 1985, at the Hoosier Dome in Indianapolis. This was the first NBA All-Star Game to be held in Indianapolis. This also marked the game's return to February since 1981 and to the state of Indiana since 1953, when it was hosted by the Fort Wayne Pistons (now Detroit Pistons). It was initially scheduled to be held at the Market Square Arena, home of the Indiana Pacers, but was moved to the Hoosier Dome, home of the National Football League's Indianapolis Colts, to accommodate a crowd more than twice the arena's capacity, making it the first All-Star Game played in a non-NBA venue. The game had an attendance of 43,146, which was an NBA record until it was surpassed in 1989. The Saturday events such as the Slam Dunk Contest and other side events were still held at the Market Square Arena on February 9, 1985.

The West All-Stars defeated the East All-Stars, 140–129. The MVP was Ralph Sampson of the Houston Rockets, with 24 points and 10 rebounds.

== Coaches ==
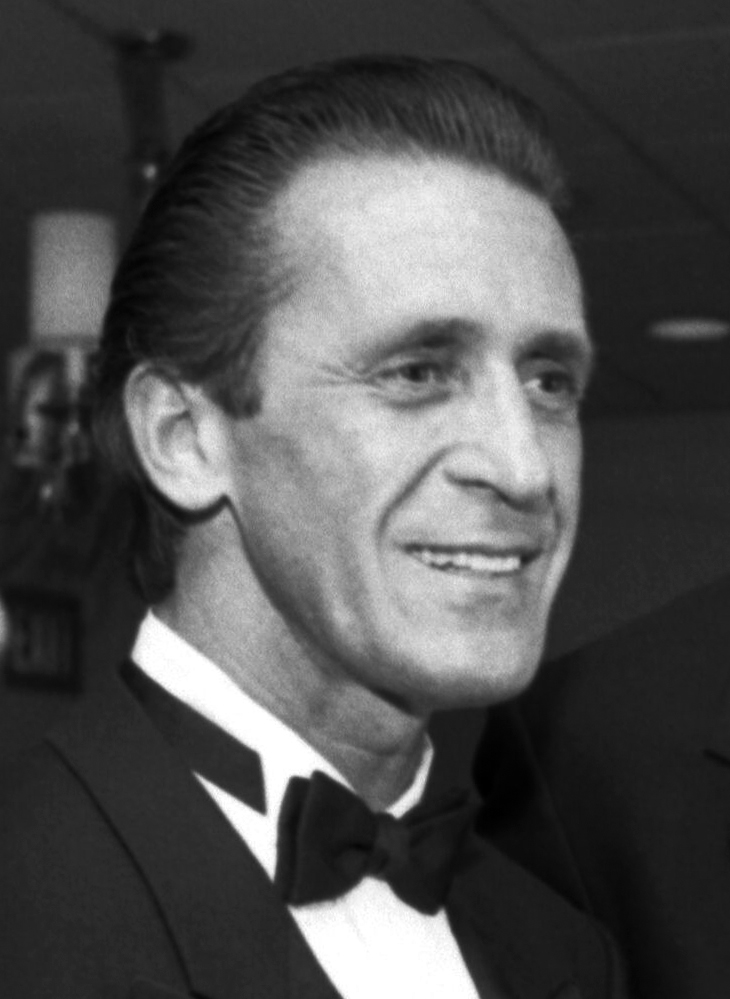
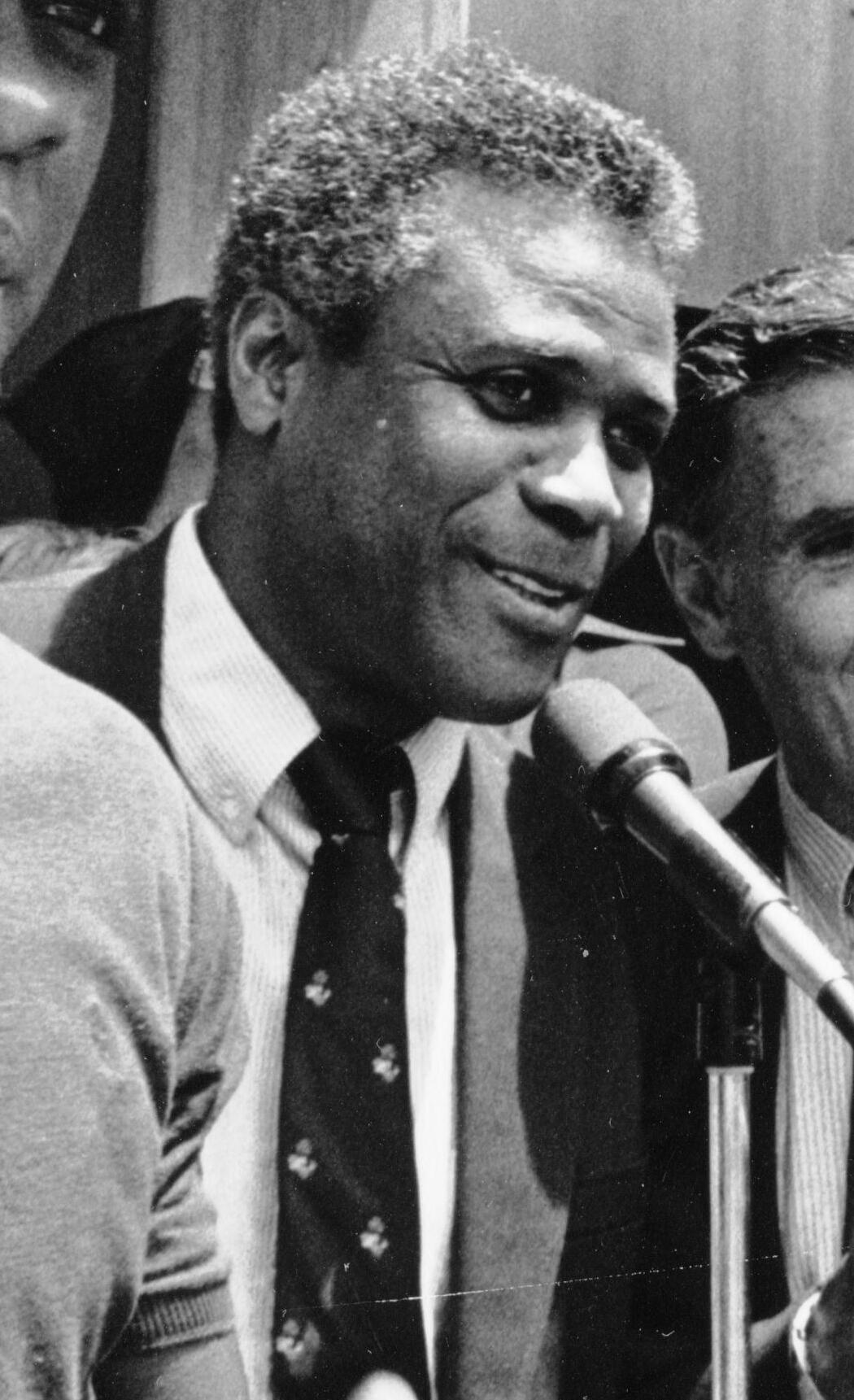
Pat Riley and K.C. Jones were selected as the West and East head coach, respectively.

K. C. Jones, head coach of the Eastern Conference leader Boston Celtics, coached the East team. Pat Riley, head coach of the Western Conference leader Los Angeles Lakers, coached the West team.

== Roster ==
=== Western Conference ===
| Player, Team | MIN | FGM | FGA | FTM | FTA | REB | AST | PTS |
Starters
| Adrian Dantley, Utah Jazz | 23 | 2 | 6 | 6 | 6 | 2 | 1 | 10 |
| Ralph Sampson, Houston Rockets | 29 | 10 | 15 | 4 | 6 | 10 | 1 | 24 |
| Kareem Abdul-Jabbar, Los Angeles Lakers | 23 | 5 | 10 | 1 | 2 | 6 | 1 | 11 |
| Magic Johnson, Los Angeles Lakers | 31 | 7 | 14 | 7 | 8 | 5 | 15 | 21 |
| George Gervin, San Antonio Spurs | 25 | 10 | 12 | 3 | 4 | 3 | 1 | 23 |
Reserves
| Alex English, Denver Nuggets | 14 | 0 | 3 | 0 | 0 | 2 | 1 | 0 |
| Norm Nixon, Los Angeles Clippers | 19 | 5 | 7 | 1 | 2 | 2 | 8 | 11 |
| Larry Nance, Phoenix Suns | 15 | 7 | 8 | 2 | 2 | 5 | 0 | 16 |
| Rolando Blackman, Dallas Mavericks | 23 | 7 | 14 | 1 | 2 | 3 | 2 | 15 |
| Jack Sikma, Seattle SuperSonics | 12 | 0 | 2 | 0 | 0 | 2 | 0 | 0 |
| Calvin Natt, Denver Nuggets | 11 | 1 | 3 | 1 | 2 | 3 | 1 | 3 |
| Akeem Olajuwon, Houston Rockets | 15 | 2 | 2 | 2 | 6 | 5 | 1 | 6 |
| Totals | 240 | 56 | 96 | 28 | 40 | 48 | 32 | 140 |

=== Eastern Conference ===
| Player, Team | MIN | FGM | FGA | FTM | FTA | REB | AST | PTS |
Starters
| Julius Erving, Philadelphia 76ers | 23 | 5 | 15 | 2 | 2 | 4 | 3 | 12 |
| Larry Bird, Boston Celtics | 31 | 8 | 16 | 5 | 6 | 8 | 2 | 21 |
| Moses Malone, Philadelphia 76ers | 33 | 2 | 10 | 3 | 6 | 12 | 1 | 7 |
| Isiah Thomas, Detroit Pistons | 25 | 9 | 14 | 1 | 1 | 2 | 5 | 22 |
| Michael Jordan, Chicago Bulls | 22 | 2 | 9 | 3 | 4 | 6 | 2 | 7 |
Reserves
| Micheal Ray Richardson, New Jersey Nets | 13 | 2 | 8 | 1 | 2 | 2 | 1 | 5 |
| Robert Parish, Boston Celtics | 10 | 2 | 5 | 0 | 0 | 6 | 1 | 4 |
| Bernard King, New York Knicks | 22 | 6 | 10 | 1 | 2 | 7 | 1 | 13 |
| Sidney Moncrief, Milwaukee Bucks | 22 | 1 | 5 | 6 | 6 | 5 | 4 | 8 |
| Terry Cummings, Milwaukee Bucks | 16 | 7 | 17 | 3 | 4 | 7 | 0 | 17 |
| Dennis Johnson, Boston Celtics | 12 | 3 | 7 | 2 | 2 | 6 | 3 | 8 |
| Bill Laimbeer, Detroit Pistons | 11 | 2 | 4 | 1 | 2 | 3 | 1 | 5 |
| Jeff Ruland, Washington Bullets (injured) |
| Totals | 240 | 49 | 120 | 28 | 37 | 68 | 24 | 129 |

== Score by periods ==
- Halftime— Tied, 68–68
- Third Quarter— West, 97–92

== NBA All-Star Legends Classic ==
- This event returned after a successful run from 1984; here the East was represented by the likes of Earl Monroe, Pete Maravich, Zelmo Beaty, Dave DeBusschere, Walt Frazier, Rick Barry, Tom Heinsohn, Nate Thurmond, George Yardley, Bob Davies and Bob Pettit.
- The West was represented by the likes of Roger Brown, John Havlicek, Mel Daniels, Tom Van Arsdale, Dick Van Arsdale, Oscar Robertson, Walt Bellamy, Connie Hawkins, Dave Bing, Bob Cousy and Red Kerr.

== Slam Dunk Contest ==
The Slam Dunk Contest was held on February 9, 1985, at the Market Square Arena.

Indicates the champion

| # | P | Player | Team | First Round | | | | Semifinals | | | | Finals | | | |
| # | P | Player | Team | 1 | 2 | 3 | T | 1 | 2 | 3 | T | 1 | 2 | 3 | T |
|---|---|---|---|---|---|---|---|---|---|---|---|---|---|---|---|
| 1 | F | Dominique Wilkins | Atlanta Hawks | 47 | 49 | 49 | 145 | 48 | 45 | 47 | 140 | 47 | 50 | 50 | 147 |
| 2 | G/F | Michael Jordan | Chicago Bulls | 44 | 42 | 42 | 130 | 45 | 47 | 50 | 142 | 43 | 44 | 49 | 136 |
| 3 | G | Terence Stansbury | Indiana Pacers | 46 | 50 | 34 | 130 | 49 | 48 | 39 | 136 | DNQ | | | |
| 4 | F | Julius Erving | Philadelphia 76ers | Bye (Note: Erving and Nance received first-round byes as they were the finalists from the previous year.) | | | — | 43 | 44 | 45 | 132 | DNQ | | | |
| 5 | F | Larry Nance | Phoenix Suns | Bye | | | — | 42 | 47 | 42 | 131 | DNQ | | | |
| 6 | G | Darrell Griffith | Utah Jazz | 38 | 42 | 46 | 126 | DNQ | | | | | | | |
| 7 | F | Orlando Woolridge | Chicago Bulls | 40 | 43 | 41 | 124 | DNQ | | | | | | | |
| 8 | G/F | Clyde Drexler | Portland Trail Blazers | 39 | 39 | 44 | 122 | DNQ | | | | | | | |
