= 2005 NBA All-Star Game =

Exhibition basketball game

	1	2	3	4	Total
East	27	34	34	30	125
West	33	26	30	26	115
- Date: February 20, 2005
- Arena: Pepsi Center
- City: Denver
- MVP: Allen Iverson
- National anthem: The United States Air Force Academy Choir (American), Tamia (Canada)
- Halftime show: LeAnn Rimes, Big & Rich
- Attendance: 18,227
- Network: TNT; ESPN Radio
- Announcers: Marv Albert, Doug Collins, Steve Kerr; Kevin Harlan, Charles Barkley, Kenny Smith, Magic Johnson and Julius Erving (All-Star Saturday Night); Jim Durham and James Worthy

NBA All-Star Game
< 2004	2006 >

The 2005 NBA All-Star Game was an exhibition basketball game which was played on February 20, 2005, at Pepsi Center in Denver, home of the Denver Nuggets. This game was the 54th edition of the North American National Basketball Association (NBA) All-Star Game and was played during the 2004–05 NBA season.

For the second time in the last six years, the East defeated the West 125–115, with Allen Iverson of the Philadelphia 76ers named the Most Valuable Player. Iverson scored 15 points, handed out 10 assists, and had 5 steals. Ray Allen led the West with 17, and 5-for-11 from three-point range.

== All-Star Game ==
=== Coaches ===
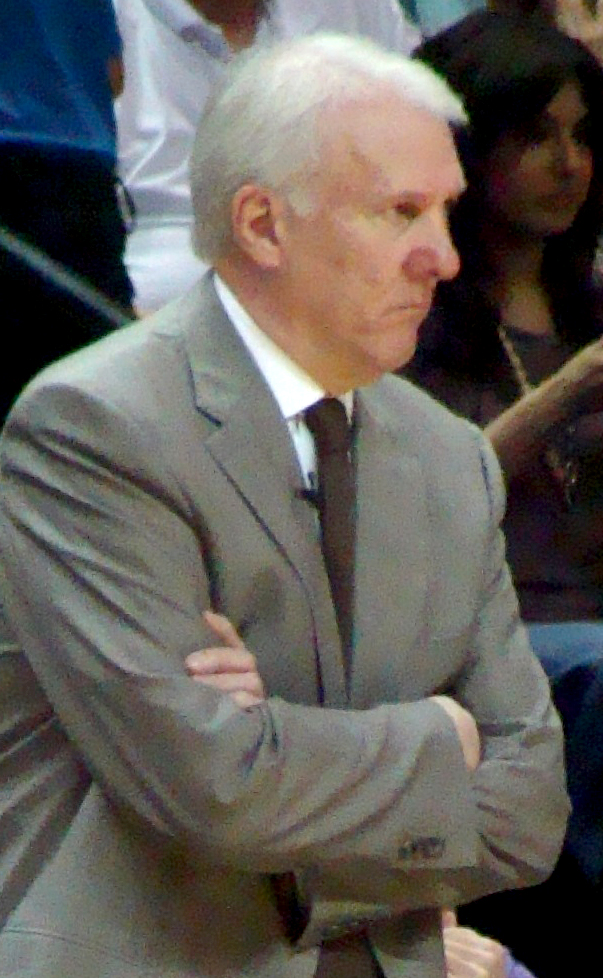
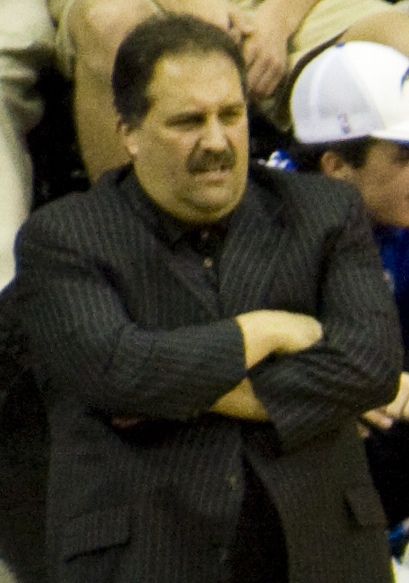
Gregg Popovich (left) and Stan Van Gundy (right) were selected as the West and East head coach, respectively.

The coaches for the All-Star game were the head coaches who led the teams with the best winning percentages in their conference through the games of February 6, 2005. The coach for the Western Conference team was San Antonio Spurs head coach Gregg Popovich. The Spurs had a 41–12 record on February 20. The coach for the Eastern Conference team was Miami Heat head coach Stan Van Gundy. The Heat had a 40–14 record on February 20.

=== Players ===
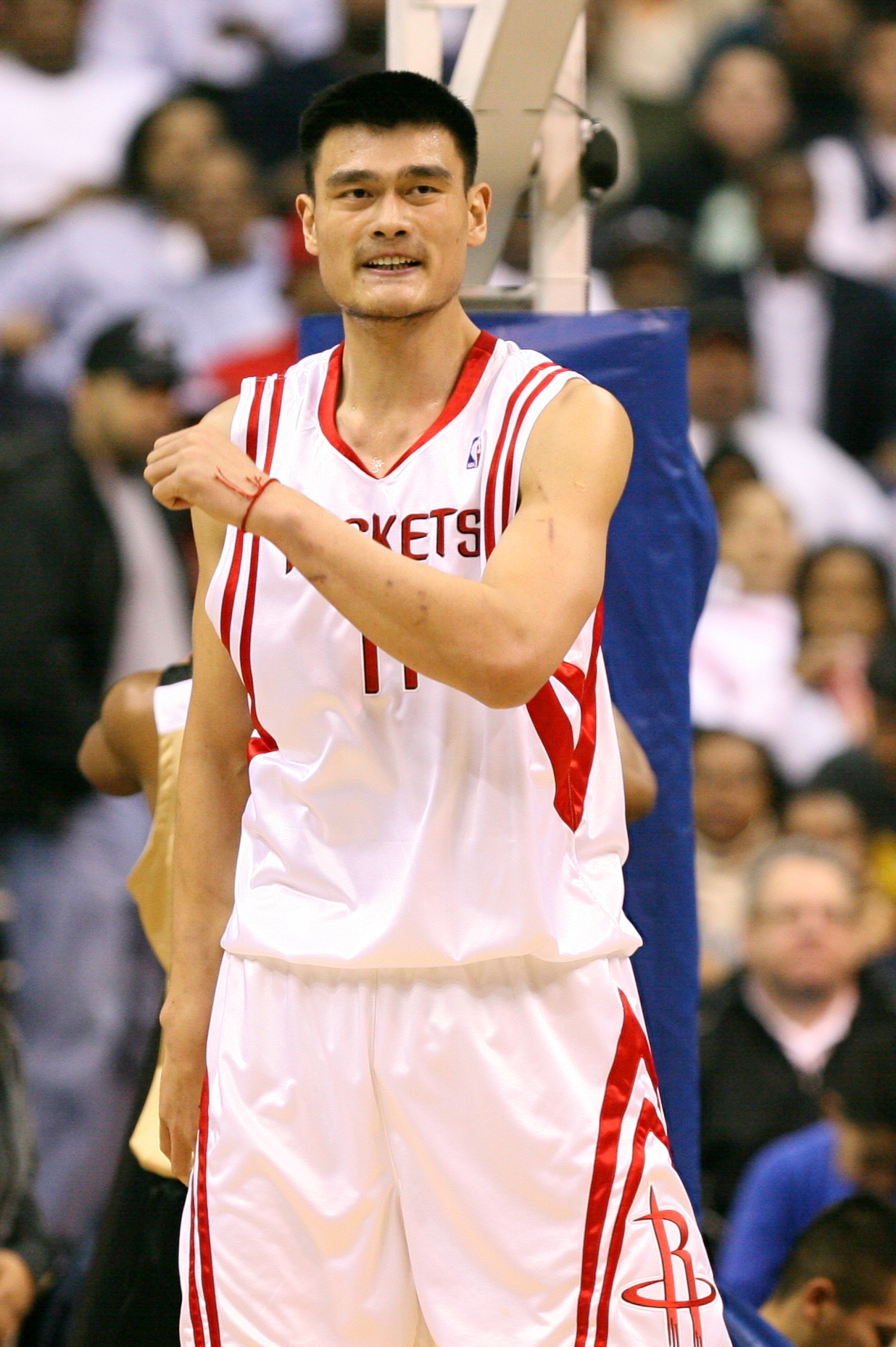
Yao Ming received the most votes for the 2005 All-Star game

The rosters for the All-Star Game were chosen in two ways. The starters were chosen via a fan ballot. Two guards, two forwards and one center who received the highest vote were named the All-Star starters. The reserves were chosen by votes among the NBA head coaches in their respective conferences. The coaches were not permitted to vote for their own players. The reserves consist of two guards, two forwards, one center and two players regardless of position. If a player is unable to participate due to injury, the commissioner will select a replacement.

The 2005 NBA All-Star introduced international players who became superstars. Amongst the players selected were: Žydrūnas Ilgauskas (Lithuania), Manu Ginóbili (Argentina), Steve Nash (Canada), Dirk Nowitzki (Germany) along with voted-starters Tim Duncan (U.S. Virgin Islands) and Yao Ming (China). This game tied the 2003 and 2004 All-Star Game record for the most international All-Stars in one year.

Yao Ming of the Houston Rockets led the ballots with 2,558,578 votes, which earned him a starting position in the Western Conference team for the third year in a row. Tracy McGrady, Kobe Bryant, Kevin Garnett, and Duncan completed the Western Conference starting positions. This was also the same starting line-up as the previous year, with the exception that McGrady started for the East. The Western Conference reserves included three first-time selections, Ginobili of the San Antonio Spurs, Amare Stoudemire of the Phoenix Suns, and Rashard Lewis of the Seattle SuperSonics. The team was rounded out by Nash, Nowitzki, Ray Allen, and Shawn Marion. The Phoenix Suns had three representations at the All-Star Game (Marion, Stoudemire, Nash), while two other teams, Houston Rockets, and San Antonio Spurs, had two representations with McGrady/Yao, and Duncan/Ginobili.

After being traded to the Eastern Conference's Miami Heat, Shaquille O'Neal led the East ballots with 2,488,089 votes. This would be O'Neal's twelfth appearance as an All-Star. Allen Iverson, Vince Carter, LeBron James, and Grant Hill completed the Eastern Conference starting position. This was James' first All-Star appearance. The Eastern Conference reserves included three first-time selections, Dwyane Wade, Gilbert Arenas, and Antawn Jamison. Ilgauskas, Ben Wallace, Jermaine O'Neal, and Paul Pierce rounded out the team. Three teams, Cleveland Cavaliers, Miami Heat, and Washington Wizards, had two representations at the All-Star Game with James/Ilgauskas, O'Neal/Wade, and Arenas/Jamison.

=== Roster ===
Western Conference All-Stars
Pos	Player	Team	No. of selections	Votes
Starters
G	Kobe Bryant	Los Angeles Lakers	7	1,815,952
G	Tracy McGrady	Houston Rockets	5	1,993,687
F	Kevin Garnett	Minnesota Timberwolves	8	2,087,200
F	Tim Duncan	San Antonio Spurs	7	1,812,522
C	Yao Ming	Houston Rockets	3	2,558,578
Reserves
G	Ray Allen	Seattle SuperSonics	5	—
G	Manu Ginóbili	San Antonio Spurs	1	—
G	Steve Nash	Phoenix Suns	3	—
F	Rashard Lewis	Seattle SuperSonics	1	—
F	Shawn Marion	Phoenix Suns	2	—
F	Dirk Nowitzki	Dallas Mavericks	4	—
C	Amare Stoudemire	Phoenix Suns	1	—
Head coach: Gregg Popovich (San Antonio Spurs)

Eastern Conference All-Stars
Pos	Player	Team	No. of selections	Votes
Starters
G	Allen Iverson	Philadelphia 76ers	6	1,590,400
G	Vince Carter	New Jersey Nets	6	1,803,529
F	LeBron James	Cleveland Cavaliers	1	1,661,204
F	Grant Hill	Orlando Magic	7	1,497,489
C	Shaquille O'Neal	Miami Heat	12	2,488,089
Reserves
G	Gilbert Arenas	Washington Wizards	1	—
G	Dwyane Wade	Miami Heat	1	—
F	Paul Pierce	Boston Celtics	4	—
F	Antawn Jamison	Washington Wizards	1	—
F	Jermaine O'Neal	Indiana Pacers	4	—
C	Zydrunas Ilgauskas	Cleveland Cavaliers	2	—
C	Ben Wallace	Detroit Pistons	3	—
Head coach: Stan Van Gundy (Miami Heat)

=== Game ===
TNT

February 20, 2005

Western Conference 115, Eastern Conference 125
Scoring by quarter: 33–27, 26–34, 30–34, 26–30
Pts: Ray Allen 17; Rebs: Amare Stoudemire and Tim Duncan 9 Asts: Kobe Bryant 7	Pts: Allen Iverson and Jermaine O'Neal 15; Rebs: LeBron James 8 Asts: Allen Iverson 10

Pepsi Center, Denver, CO
Attendance: 18,227
Referees:
- Bill Spooner
- Jack Nies
- Ken Mauer

== All-Star Weekend ==
=== Slam Dunk Contest ===
Josh Smith of the Atlanta Hawks won the Slam Dunk Contest.

=== Three-Point Contest ===
Quentin Richardson of the Phoenix Suns won the Three-Point Shootout.
