= 1987 NBA All-Star Game =

Exhibition basketball game

	1	2	3	4	OT	Total
East	33	32	42	33	9	149
West	29	41	30	40	14	154
- Date: February 8, 1987
- Arena: Kingdome; Seattle Center Coliseum (All-Star Saturday)
- City: Seattle
- MVP: Tom Chambers (West)
- National anthem: Jeffrey Osborne
- Attendance: 34,275
- Network: CBS (All-Star Game); TBS (All-Star Saturday)
- Announcers: Dick Stockton and Tom Heinsohn; Bob Neal and Rick Barry (All-Star Saturday)

NBA All-Star Game
< 1986	1988 >

The 37th Annual NBA All-Star Game was an exhibition basketball game that was played on February 8, 1987, at Seattle's Kingdome, the previous home of the Seattle SuperSonics. It was the 37th edition of the event. Saturday events were held at Seattle Center Coliseum, then the home of the SuperSonics, on February 7, 1987. The Western All-Stars won the game in overtime, 154–149. SuperSonics power forward Tom Chambers was named the NBA All-Star Game Most Valuable Player (MVP) after scoring a game-high 34 points.

The Eastern Conference team consisted of the Washington Bullets' Moses Malone and Jeff Malone, the Philadelphia 76ers' Julius Erving, Maurice Cheeks and Charles Barkley, the Boston Celtics' Larry Bird, Robert Parish and Kevin McHale, the Detroit Pistons' Isiah Thomas and Bill Laimbeer, the Atlanta Hawks' Dominique Wilkins and the Chicago Bulls' Michael Jordan.

In addition to game MVP Tom Chambers, the Western Conference team featured the Los Angeles Lakers' Magic Johnson, James Worthy and Kareem Abdul-Jabbar, the Golden State Warriors' Sleepy Floyd and Joe Barry Carroll, the Dallas Mavericks' Rolando Blackman and Mark Aguirre, the San Antonio Spurs' Alvin Robertson, the Phoenix Suns' Walter Davis, the Denver Nuggets' Alex English and the Houston Rockets' Akeem Olajuwon. Houston's Ralph Sampson was selected but unable to play due to injury.

This was the second and most recent NBA All-Star Game held in Seattle, after the 1974 game. The host SuperSonics later relocated to Oklahoma City and rebranded as the Oklahoma City Thunder in 2008.

== Coaches ==
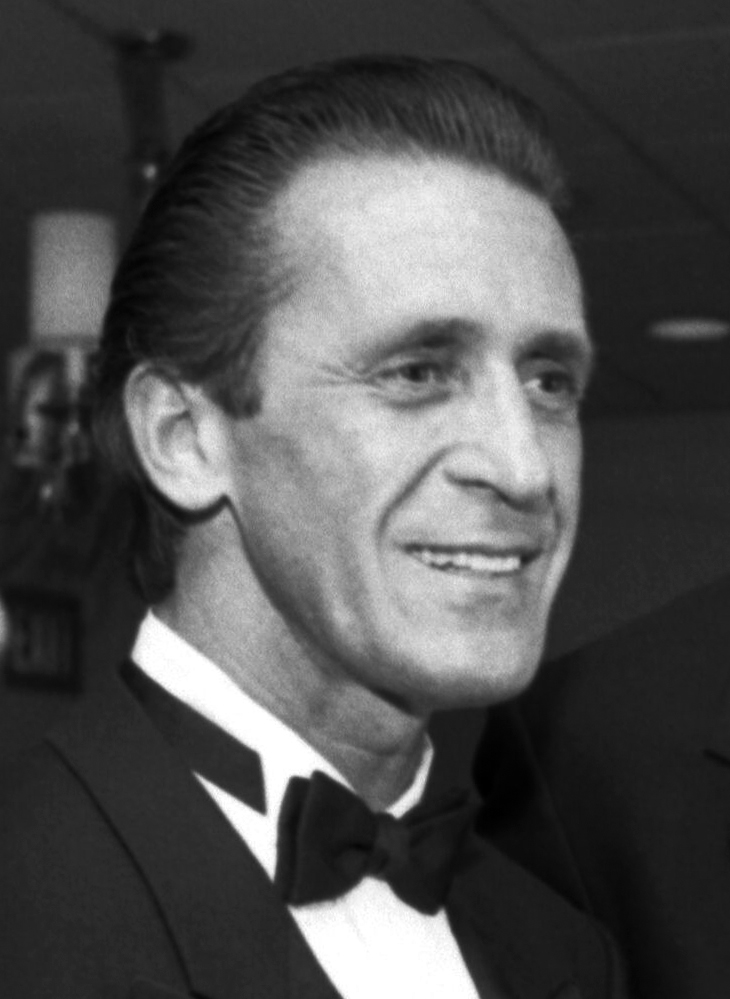
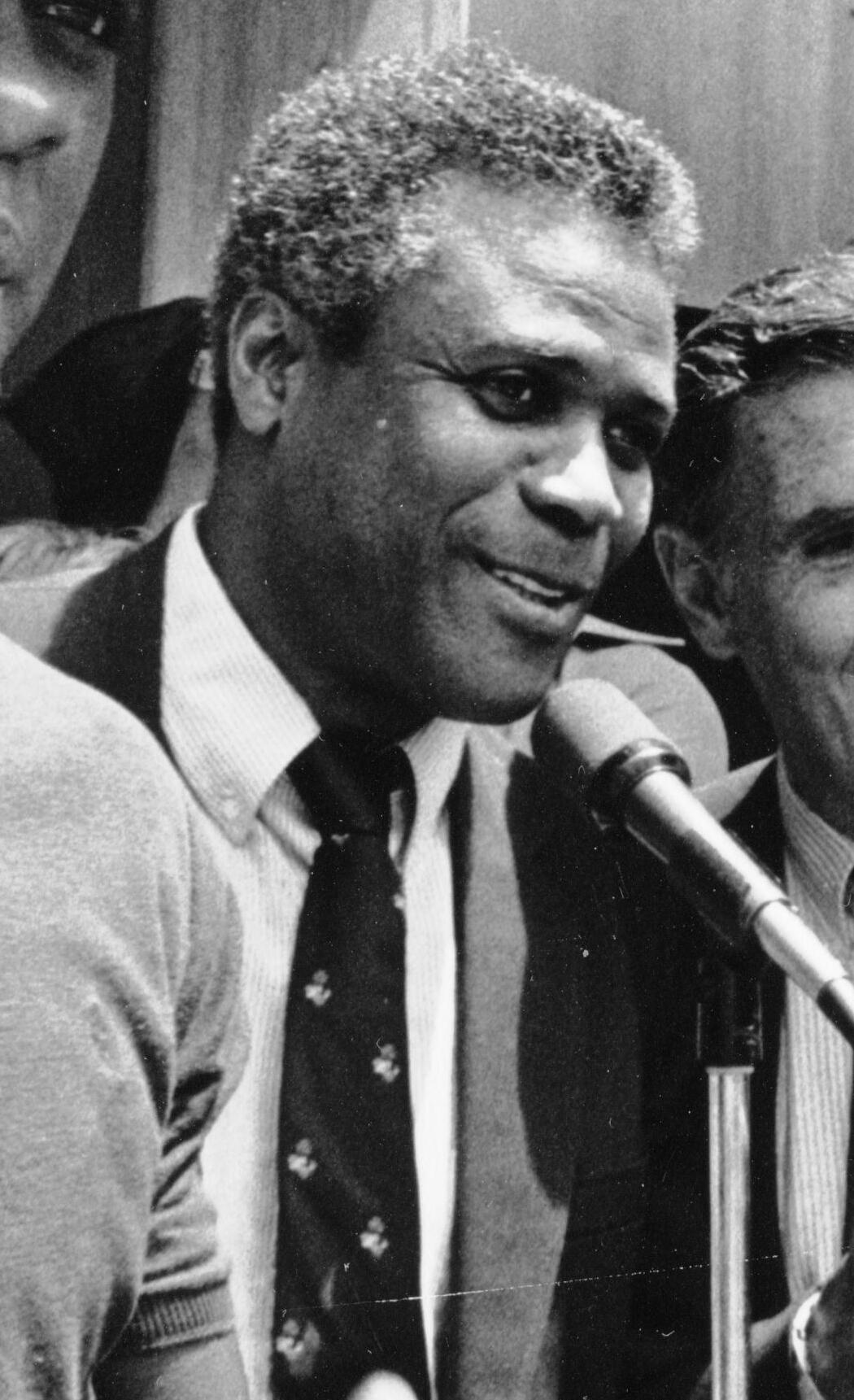
Pat Riley and K.C. Jones were selected as the West and East head coach, respectively.

K. C. Jones, head coach of the Eastern Conference leader Boston Celtics, coached the East team. Pat Riley, head coach of the Western Conference leader Los Angeles Lakers, coached the West team. This is the third straight game that features both Riley and Jones as coaches.

== Rosters ==
Eastern Conference All-Stars
Pos.	Player	Team	Appearance	Votes
Starters
G	Michael Jordan	Chicago Bulls	3rd	1,141,733
G	Julius Erving	Philadelphia 76ers	11th	819,468
F	Dominique Wilkins	Atlanta Hawks	2nd	1,029,131
F	Larry Bird	Boston Celtics	8th	902,701
C	Moses Malone	Washington Bullets	10th	565,491
Reserves
F	Kevin McHale	Boston Celtics	3rd	455,859
G	Isiah Thomas	Detroit Pistons	6th	713,173
F	Charles Barkley	Philadelphia 76ers	1st	479,176
G	Jeff Malone	Washington Bullets	2nd	206,255
C	Bill Laimbeer	Detroit Pistons	4th	432,104
C	Robert Parish	Boston Celtics	7th	510,471
G	Maurice Cheeks	Philadelphia 76ers	3rd	174,512
Head coach: K. C. Jones (Boston Celtics)

Western Conference All-Stars
Pos.	Player	Team	Appearance	Votes
Starters
G	Magic Johnson	Los Angeles Lakers	7th	949,304
G	Alvin Robertson	San Antonio Spurs	2nd	457,251
F	James Worthy	Los Angeles Lakers	2nd	588,778
F	Ralph Sampson^{DNP}	Houston Rockets	4th	611,480
C	Akeem Olajuwon	Houston Rockets	3rd	792,148
Reserves
C	Kareem Abdul-Jabbar	Los Angeles Lakers	17th	572,779
G	Rolando Blackman	Dallas Mavericks	3rd	307,838
G	Sleepy Floyd	Golden State Warriors	1st	--
C	Joe Barry Carroll	Golden State Warriors	1st	--
F	Mark Aguirre	Dallas Mavericks	2nd	339,337
G/F	Walter Davis	Phoenix Suns	6th	--
F	Alex English	Denver Nuggets	6th	343,348
F	Tom Chambers^{ST}	Seattle SuperSonics	1st	--
Head coach: Pat Riley (Los Angeles Lakers)

- ^DNPRalph Sampson was unable to play due to injury. Tom Chambers was selected as his replacement.
- ^STTom Chambers to start in place of the injured Sampson.

== Score by periods ==
Score by periods:	1	2	3	4	OT	Final
West	29	41	30	40	14	154
East	33	32	42	33	9	149

- Halftime— West, 70–65
- Third Quarter— East, 107–100
- Officials: Jess Kersey and Hue Hollins
- Attendance: 34,275.

== NBA All-Star Legends Game ==
- This fourth annual event featured the East including Pete Maravich, Dave Cowens, John Havlicek, Sam Jones, Walt Frazier, Paul Silas, Bob Cousy, Johnny Green, Wes Unseld, Harry Gallatin and Oscar Robertson.
- The West squad included Fred Brown, Spencer Haywood, Slick Watts, Jerry Lucas, Geoff Petrie, Terry Dischinger, Nate Thurmond, Tiny Archibald, Zelmo Beaty, and Ed Macauley.
