= NBA All-Star Weekend Skills Challenge =

U.S. national basketball contest

Skills Challenge
- Sport: Basketball
- Competition: National Basketball Association
- Sponsored by: Kia

History
- First award: Jason Kidd, 2003
- Most recent: Team Cavs (Evan Mobley and Donovan Mitchell), 2025

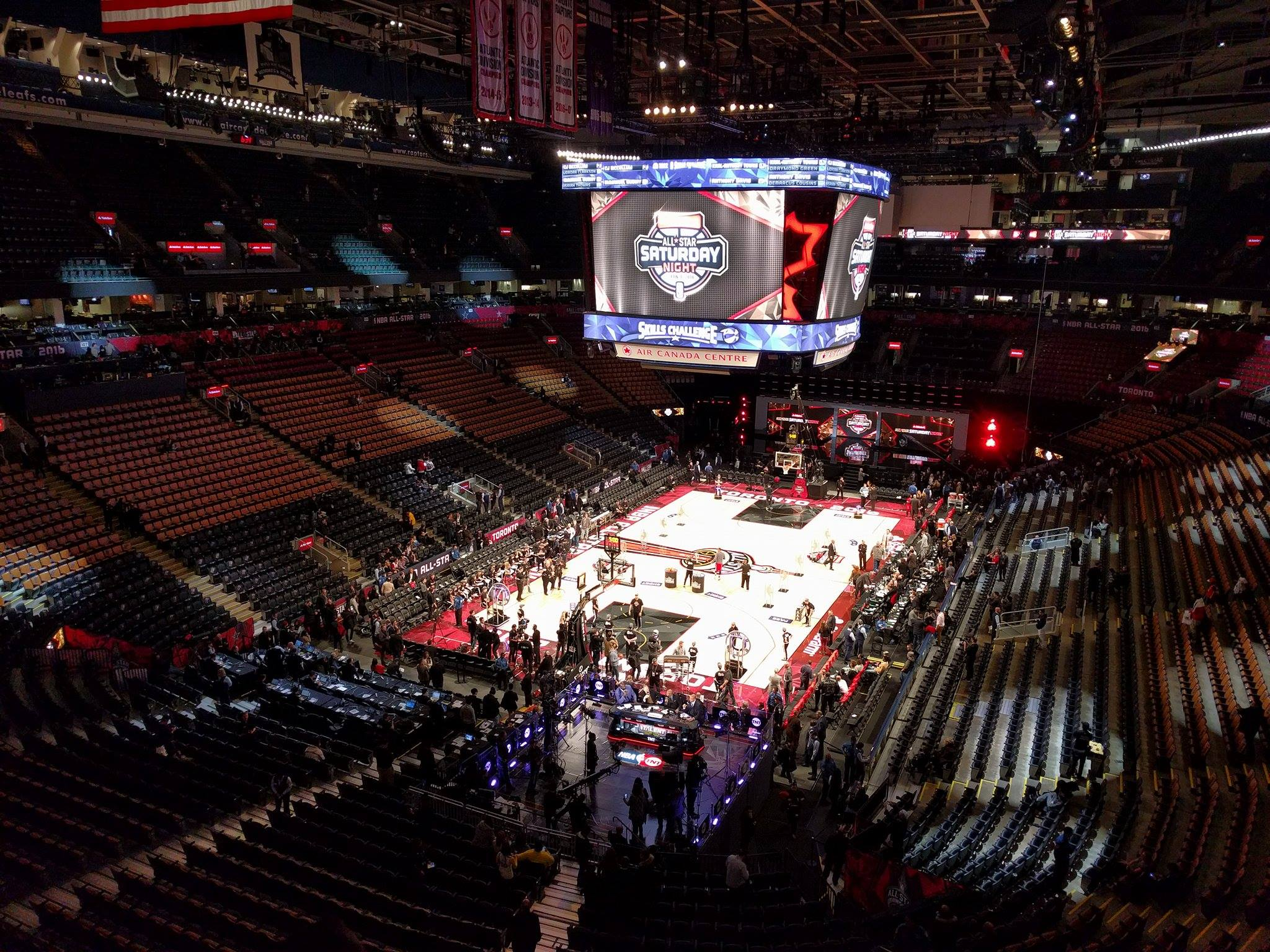
The NBA Skills Challenge in 2016

The NBA Skills Challenge (officially named the Kia Skills Challenge) was a National Basketball Association (NBA) contest held on the Saturday before the annual All-Star Game as part of the All-Star Weekend. First held in 2003 and last held in 2025, it was a competition to test ball-handling, passing, and shooting ability. In 2026, it was replaced by the returning Shooting Stars competition.

Until the 2022 edition, two participants raced against each other on identical courses by first dribbling between five obstacles while running down the court. Next, the player must throw a pass into an upright hoop. Then, the players must dribble back the full length of the court for a lay up. Shortly after, the players must dribble back down the court and hit a three pointer from the top of the basketball key. The match ends when the first player hits the three pointer. The champion was decided via a single elimination tournament format, with a guard and a frontcourt player guaranteed to face off in the final round. Frontcourt players were first allowed and invited to participate in 2016, and the event has since crowned centers and forwards as winners, beginning with Karl-Anthony Towns that year and followed by Kristaps Porziņģis in 2017, Bam Adebayo in 2020, and Domantas Sabonis in 2021.

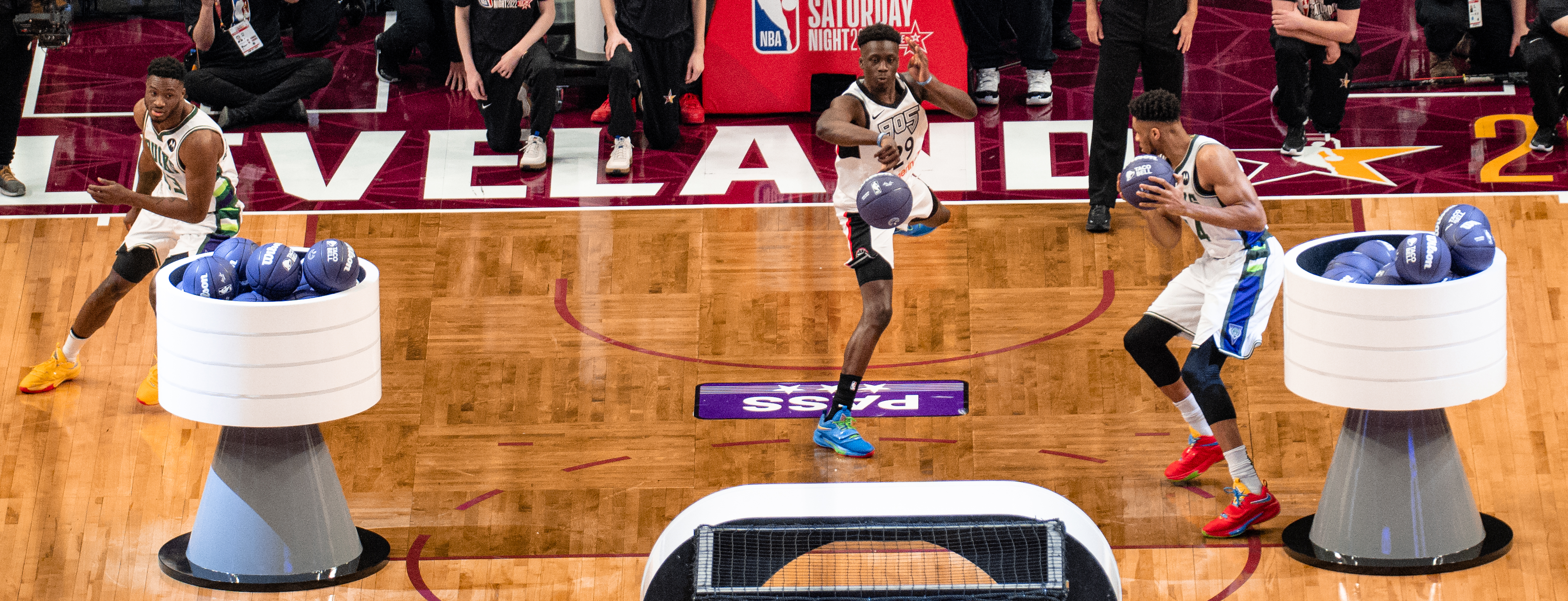
The 2022 NBA All Star Skills Challenge

In the format used from 2022 to 2025, three teams participate in a four-round competition. One of the teams competing is always composed of players from the host team. The first round is identical to previous editions, this time as a team relay, with the fastest team earning 100 points. The second round is a passing challenge where players must pass the ball through different targets, with the highest-scoring team also earning 100 points. The third round is a shooting challenge where players must make field goals from different spots, with the highest-scoring team earning 200 points. The two highest-scoring teams overall advance to the final round, which is a half-court shootout, where the fastest team to make a field goal from the half-court line wins the entire skills challenge. The format was slightly altered in 2023, with the challenge now ending after three rounds. The order of the first three rounds is reversed and the half-court shootout becomes a tiebreaker round. The contest was removed from the all-star weekend line-up in 2026, with the returning Shooting Stars Competition taking its place. The most recent champions are Donovan Mitchell and Evan Mobley from Team Cavaliers in 2025.

== Winners ==
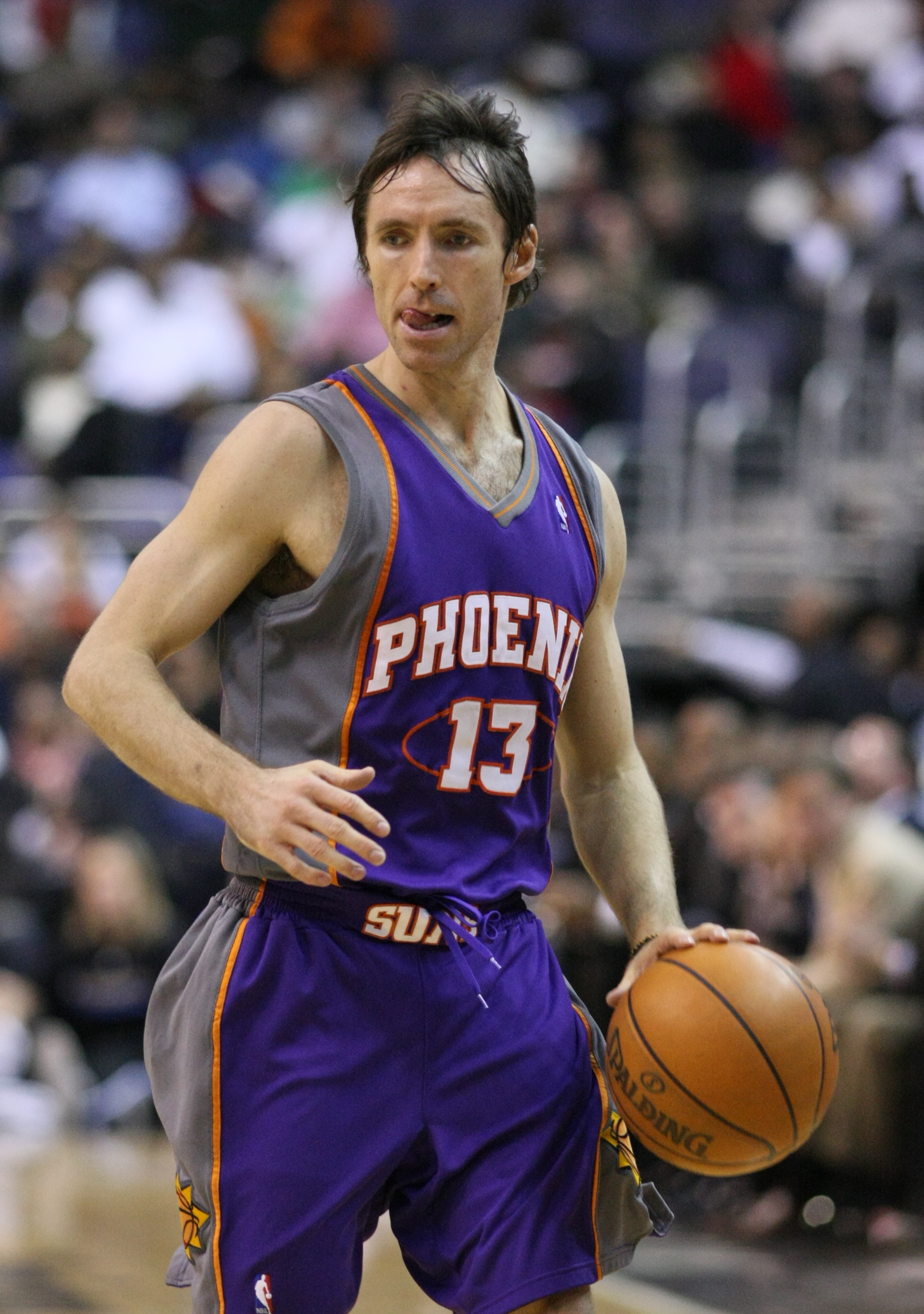
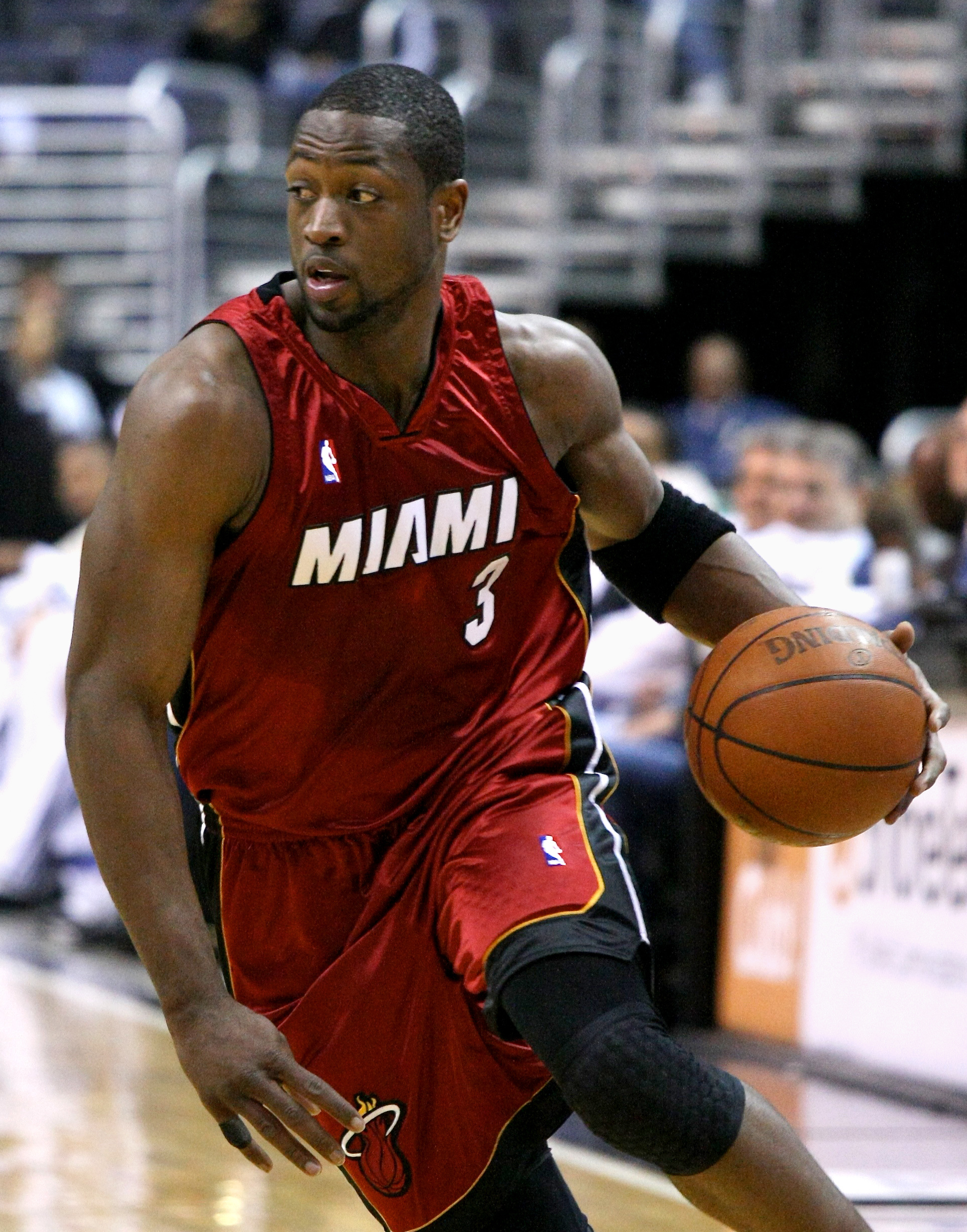
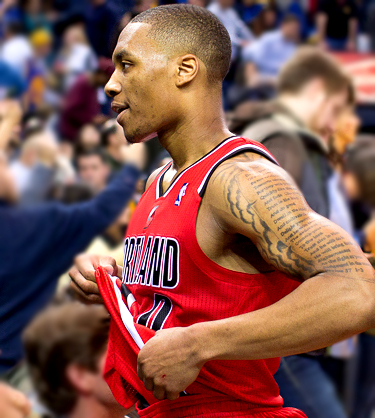
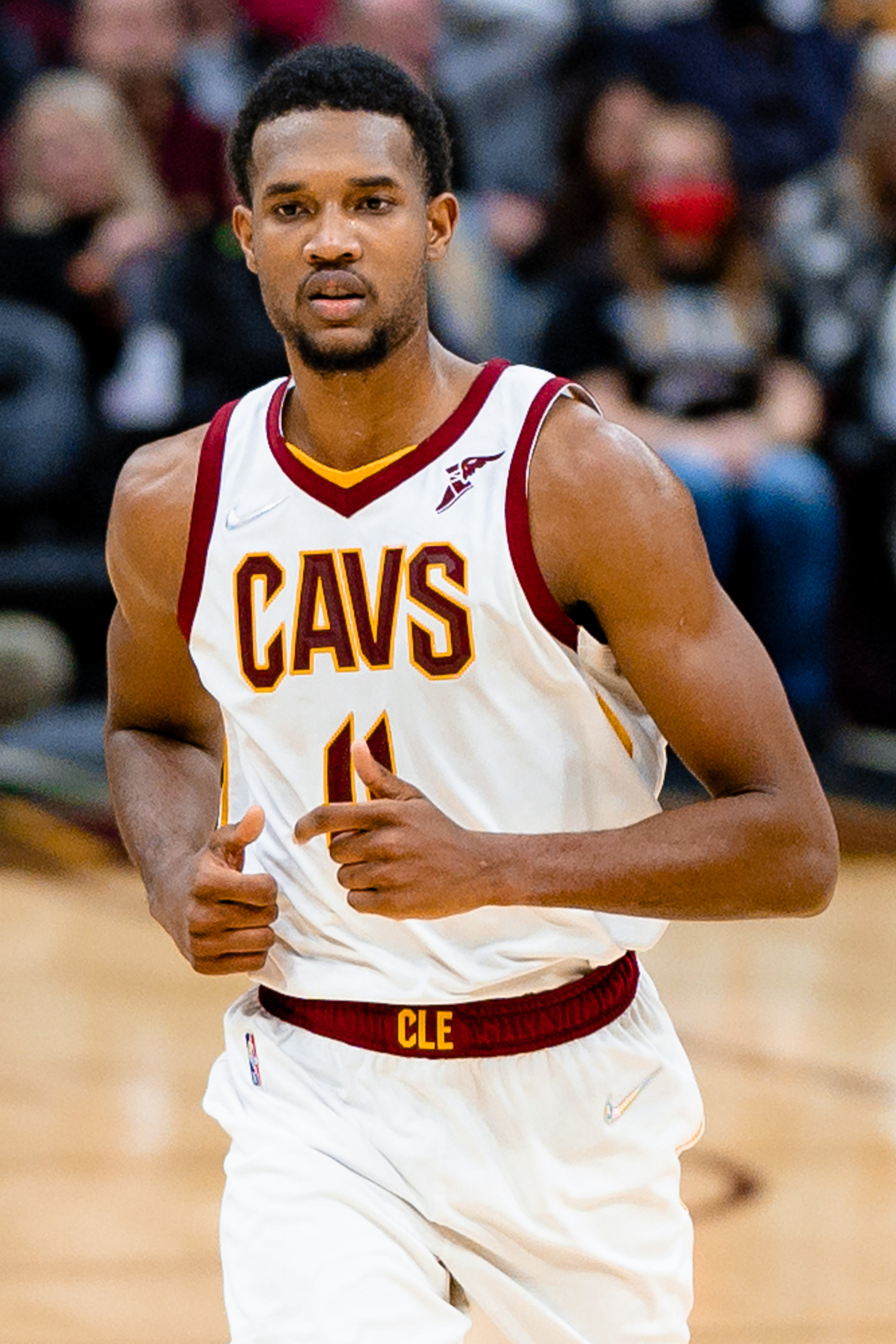
Steve Nash (top left), Dwyane Wade (top right), Damian Lillard (bottom left), and Evan Mobley (bottom right) all share the record for most titles won (2).

| ^ | Active NBA player |
| * | Inducted into the Naismith Memorial Basketball Hall of Fame |
| † | Not yet eligible for Hall of Fame consideration (Note: A player is not eligible for induction into the Naismith Memorial Basketball Hall of Fame until he has been fully retired for three calendar years.) |
| Player(s) (#) | Denotes the number of times the player has won |
| Team(s) (#) | Denotes the number of times a player from this team has won |

| Season | Player(s) | Nationality | Team(s) | Time |
|---|---|---|---|---|
| 2002–03 | Jason Kidd* | United States | New Jersey Nets | 35.1 seconds |
| 2003–04 | Baron Davis | United States | New Orleans Hornets | 31.6 seconds |
| 2004–05 | Steve Nash* | Canada | Phoenix Suns | 25.8 seconds |
| 2005–06 | Dwyane Wade* | United States | Miami Heat | 26.1 seconds |
| 2006–07 | Dwyane Wade* (2) | United States | Miami Heat (2) | 26.4 seconds |
| 2007–08 | Deron Williams | United States | Utah Jazz | 25.5 seconds^{[a]} |
| 2008–09 | Derrick Rose^{†} | United States | Chicago Bulls | 35.3 seconds |
| 2009–10 | Steve Nash* (2) | Canada | Phoenix Suns (2) | 29.9 seconds |
| 2010–11 | Stephen Curry^ | United States | Golden State Warriors | 28.2 seconds |
| 2011–12 | Tony Parker* | France | San Antonio Spurs | 32.8 seconds |
| 2012–13 | Damian Lillard^ | United States | Portland Trail Blazers | 29.8 seconds |
| 2013–14 | Damian Lillard^ (2) Trey Burke | United States; United States | Portland Trail Blazers (2); Utah Jazz (2) | 45.2 seconds |
| 2014–15 | Patrick Beverley | United States | Houston Rockets | — |
| 2015–16 | Karl-Anthony Towns^ | Dominican Republic | Minnesota Timberwolves | — |
| 2016–17 | Kristaps Porziņģis^ | Latvia | New York Knicks | — |
| 2017–18 | Spencer Dinwiddie^ | United States | Brooklyn Nets (2) | — |
| 2018–19 | Jayson Tatum^ | United States | Boston Celtics | — |
| 2019–20 | Bam Adebayo^ | United States | Miami Heat (3) | — |
| 2020–21 | Domantas Sabonis^ | Lithuania | Indiana Pacers | — |
| 2021–22 | Darius Garland^ Evan Mobley^ Jarrett Allen^ | United States; United States; United States | Cleveland Cavaliers | — |
| 2022–23 | Jordan Clarkson^ Walker Kessler^ Collin Sexton^ | Philippines (Note: Jordan Clarkson was born in the United States but naturalized Filipino. He represents the Philippines in international games.); United States; United States | Utah Jazz (3) | — |
| 2023–24 | Tyrese Haliburton^ Myles Turner^ Bennedict Mathurin^ | United States; United States; Canada | Indiana Pacers (2) | — |
| 2024–25 | Donovan Mitchell^ Evan Mobley^ (2) | United States; United States | Cleveland Cavaliers (2) | — |

== Multiple-time leaders ==
| Rank | Player | Team | Times leader | Years |
|---|---|---|---|---|
| 1 | Evan Mobley | Cleveland Cavaliers | 2 | (2022, 2025) |
| 1 | Damian Lillard | Portland Trail Blazers | 2 | (2013, 2014) |
| 1 | Steve Nash | Phoenix Suns | 2 | (2005, 2010) |
| 1 | Dwyane Wade | Miami Heat | 2 | (2006, 2007) |

== All-time participants ==
| **Player** **(in bold text)** | Indicates the winner of the contest |
| Player (#) | Denotes the number of times the player has been in the contest |

| Year | Players |
|---|---|
| 2003 | **Jason Kidd**, Stephon Marbury, Tony Parker, Gary Payton |
| 2004 | Earl Boykins, **Baron Davis**, Derek Fisher, Stephon Marbury (2) |
| 2005 | Gilbert Arenas, Earl Boykins (2), **Steve Nash**, Luke Ridnour |
| 2006 | LeBron James, Steve Nash (2), Chris Paul, **Dwyane Wade** |
| 2007 | Kobe Bryant, LeBron James (2), Chris Paul (2), **Dwyane Wade** (2) |
| 2008 | Jason Kidd (2), Chris Paul (3), Dwyane Wade (3), **Deron Williams** |
| 2009 | Devin Harris, Jameer Nelson^{[b]}, Tony Parker (2), **Derrick Rose**, Mo Williams |
| 2010 | Brandon Jennings, **Steve Nash** (3), Derrick Rose^{[c]}, Deron Williams (2), Russell Westbrook |
| 2011 | **Stephen Curry**, Chris Paul (4), Derrick Rose (2), John Wall, Russell Westbrook (2) |
| 2012 | Stephen Curry^{[d]} (2), Kyrie Irving, **Tony Parker** (3), Rajon Rondo, John Wall (2), Russell Westbrook (3), Deron Williams (3) |
| 2013 | Jrue Holiday, Brandon Knight, **Damian Lillard**, Jeremy Lin, Tony Parker (4), Jeff Teague |
| 2014 | DeMar DeRozan/Giannis Antetokounmpo, Michael Carter-Williams/Victor Oladipo, Reggie Jackson/Goran Dragić, **Damian Lillard (2)/Trey Burke**^{[e]} |
| 2015 | ((Isaiah Thomas vs. John Wall (3)^{[f]}, **Patrick Beverley**), (Michael Carter-Williams (2)^{[g]}, Robert Covington^{[g]}, Elfrid Payton vs. Jeff Teague (2))) vs. ((Trey Burke (2) vs. Brandon Knight (2)), (Jimmy Butler^{[h]}, Dennis Schröder vs. Kyle Lowry^{[i]})) |
| 2016 | ((Jordan Clarkson vs. CJ McCollum), (Isaiah Thomas (2) vs. Patrick Beverley (2)^{[j]}, Emmanuel Mudiay)) vs. ((Draymond Green vs. **Karl-Anthony Towns**), (DeMarcus Cousins vs. Anthony Davis)) |
| 2017 | ((Gordon Hayward vs. John Wall (4)), (Devin Booker vs. Isaiah Thomas (3))) vs. ((DeMarcus Cousins (2) vs. **Kristaps Porziņģis**), (Joel Embiid^{[k]}, Nikola Jokić vs. Anthony Davis (2))) |
| 2018 | ((Al Horford vs. Joel Embiid (2)), (Kristaps Porziņģis (2)^{[l]}, Andre Drummond vs. Lauri Markkanen)) vs. ((**Spencer Dinwiddie** vs. Donovan Mitchell^{[m]}, Buddy Hield), (Jamal Murray vs. Lou Williams)) |
| 2019 | ((Nikola Jokić (2) vs. Nikola Vučević), (Mike Conley Jr. vs. **Jayson Tatum**)) vs. ((De'Aaron Fox vs. Trae Young), (Luka Dončić vs. Kyle Kuzma)) |
| 2020 | ((Spencer Dinwiddie (2) vs. **Bam Adebayo**), (Patrick Beverley (3) vs. Pascal Siakam)) vs. ((Shai Gilgeous-Alexander vs. Khris Middleton), (Jayson Tatum (2) vs. Domantas Sabonis)) |
| 2021 | (((**Domantas Sabonis** (2) vs. Julius Randle) vs. Luka Dončić)) vs. (((Nikola Vučević vs. Robert Covington) vs. Chris Paul (5))) |
| 2022 | **Cavs (Darius Garland, Evan Mobley, Jarrett Allen)** vs. Antetokounmpos (Giannis (2), Thanasis, Alex) vs. Rooks (Scottie Barnes, Cade Cunningham, Josh Giddey) |
| 2023 | **Jazz (Jordan Clarkson, Collin Sexton, Walker Kessler)** vs. Antetokounmpos (Giannis (3), Thanasis (2), Alex (2), Jrue Holiday) vs. Rooks (Paolo Banchero, Jaden Ivey, Jabari Smith Jr.) |
| 2024 | **Pacers (Tyrese Haliburton, Myles Turner, Bennedict Mathurin)** vs. 1st Picks (Victor Wembanyama, Anthony Edwards, Paolo Banchero) vs. All-Stars (Trae Young (2), Scottie Barnes (2), Tyrese Maxey) |
| 2025 | **Cavaliers (Donovan Mitchell (2), Evan Mobley (2))** vs. Warriors (Draymond Green (2), Moses Moody) vs. Rooks (Zaccharie Risacher, Alex Sarr) vs. Spurs (Chris Paul (6), Victor Wembanyama) |

- **^{a}** The time is the all-time event record.
- **^{b}** Jameer Nelson was injured and was replaced by Mo Williams.
- **^{c}** Derrick Rose was injured and was replaced by Russell Westbrook.
- **^{d}** Stephen Curry was injured and was replaced by Rajon Rondo.
- **^{e}** For the 2013–14 season, the NBA All-Star Weekend Skills Challenge was revamped to have 4 teams of two players compete to a two-round time relay-style course.
- **^{f}** John Wall was replaced by Patrick Beverley due to resting purposes.
- **^{g}** Michael Carter-Williams was replaced with his teammate Robert Covington due to injuries. Covington would be replaced by Elfrid Payton due to resting purposes.
- **^{h}** Jimmy Butler was replaced by Dennis Schröder due to a shoulder injury.
- **^{i}** Starting with the 2014–15 season, the NBA All-Star Weekend Skills Challenge was revamped to a best of 8 tournament where after 8 players competed in the first round, only 4 would go to the semi-final round and 2 would participate in the championship round.
- **^{j}** Defending champion Patrick Beverley would be replaced by rookie Emmanuel Mudiay due to an ankle injury.
- **^{k}** Joel Embiid was replaced by Nikola Jokić due to a knee injury.
- **^{l}** Kristaps Porziņģis was replaced by Andre Drummond due to a torn ACL injury.
- **^{m}** Donovan Mitchell was replaced by Buddy Hield after Mitchell replaced Aaron Gordon for the Slam Dunk Contest.

== Tournament Bracket (2015–2021) ==
Starting with the 2015 edition of the Skills Challenge, a tournament format was adopted.

2015

Quarterfinals
Isaiah Thomas (Phoenix) | X
Patrick Beverley (Houston) | O
Jeff Teague (Atlanta) | O
Elfrid Payton (Orlando) | X
Trey Burke (Utah) | X
Brandon Knight (Milwaukee) | O
Kyle Lowry (Toronto) | O
Dennis Schröder (Atlanta) | X

Semifinals
Patrick Beverley (Houston) | O
Jeff Teague (Atlanta) | X
Brandon Knight Milwaukee) | O
Kyle Lowry (Toronto) | X

Finals
Patrick Beverley (Houston) | O
Brandon Knight (Milwaukee) | X

2016

Quarterfinals
CJ McCollum (Portland) | O
Jordan Clarkson (L.A. Lakers) | X
Isaiah Thomas (Boston) | O
Emmanuel Mudiay (Denver) | X
Draymond Green (Golden State) | X
Karl-Anthony Towns (Minnesota) | O
DeMarcus Cousins (Sacramento) | O
Anthony Davis (New Orleans) | X

Semifinals
CJ McCollum (Portland) | X
Isaiah Thomas (Boston) | O
Karl-Anthony Towns (Minnesota) | O
DeMarcus Cousins (Sacramento) | X

Finals
Isaiah Thomas (Boston) | X
Karl-Anthony Towns (Minnesota) | O

2017

Quarterfinals
John Wall (Washington) | X
Gordon Hayward (Utah) | O
Isaiah Thomas (Boston) | O
Devin Booker (Phoenix) | X
DeMarcus Cousins (Sacramento) | X
Kristaps Porziņģis (New York) | O
Anthony Davis (New Orleans) | X
Nikola Jokić (Denver) | O

Semifinals
Gordon Hayward (Utah) | O
Isaiah Thomas (Boston) | X
Kristaps Porziņģis (New York) | O
Nikola Jokić (Denver) | X

Finals
Gordon Hayward (Utah) | X
Kristaps Porziņģis (New York) | O

2018

Quarterfinals
Spencer Dinwiddie (Brooklyn) | O
Buddy Hield (Sacramento) | X
Jamal Murray (Denver) | O
Lou Williams (LA Clippers) | X
Al Horford (Boston) | X
Joel Embiid (Philadelphia) | O
Lauri Markkanen (Chicago) | O
Andre Drummond (Detroit) | X

Semifinals
Spencer Dinwiddie (Brooklyn) | O
Jamal Murray (Denver) | X
Joel Embiid (Philadelphia) | X
Lauri Markkanen (Chicago) | O

Finals
Spencer Dinwiddie (Brooklyn) | O
Lauri Markkanen (Chicago) | X

2019

Quarterfinals
Nikola Jokić (Denver) | O
Nikola Vučević (Orlando) | X
Mike Conley Jr. (Memphis) | X
Jayson Tatum (Boston) | O
De'Aaron Fox (Sacramento) | X
Trae Young (Atlanta) | O
Luka Dončić (Dallas) | O
Kyle Kuzma (LA Lakers) | X

Semifinals
Nikola Jokić (Denver) | X
Jayson Tatum (Boston) | O
Trae Young (Atlanta) | O
Luka Dončić (Dallas) | X

Finals
Jayson Tatum (Boston) | O
Trae Young (Atlanta) | X

2020

Quarterfinals
Spencer Dinwiddie (Brooklyn) | X
Bam Adebayo (Miami) | O
Patrick Beverley (LA Clippers) | X
Pascal Siakam (Toronto) | O
Shai Gilgeous-Alexander (Oklahoma City) | X
Khris Middleton (Milwaukee) | O
Jayson Tatum (Boston) | X
Domantas Sabonis (Indiana) | O

Semifinals
Bam Adebayo (Miami) | O
Pascal Siakam (Toronto) | X
Khris Middleton (Milwaukee) | X
Domantas Sabonis (Indiana) | O

Finals
Bam Adebayo (Miami) | O
Domantas Sabonis (Indiana) | X

2021

Quarterfinals
Domantas Sabonis (Indiana) | O
Julius Randle (New York) | X
Nikola Vučević (Orlando) | O
Robert Covington (Portland) | X

Semifinals
Domantas Sabonis (Indiana) | O
Luka Dončić (Dallas) | X
Nikola Vučević (Orlando) | O
Chris Paul (Phoenix) | X

Finals
Domantas Sabonis (Indiana) | O
Nikola Vučević (Orlando) | X

== Sponsors ==
| Season | Sponsor |
|---|---|
| 2002–03 | 989 Sports |
| 2003–04 | 989 Sports |
| 2004–05 | PlayStation |
| 2005–06 | PlayStation |
| 2006–07 | PlayStation |
| 2007–08 | PlayStation |
| 2008–09 | PlayStation |
| 2009–10 | Taco Bell |
| 2010–11 | Taco Bell |
| 2011–12 | Taco Bell |
| 2012–13 | Taco Bell |
| 2013–14 | Taco Bell |
| 2014–15 | Taco Bell |
| 2015–16 | Taco Bell |
| 2016–17 | Taco Bell |
| 2017–18 | Taco Bell |
| 2018–19 | Taco Bell |
| 2019–20 | Taco Bell |
| 2020–21 | Taco Bell |
| 2021–22 | Taco Bell |
| 2022–23 | Kia |
| 2023–24 | Kia |
| 2024–25 | Kia |
