= Team LeBron =

Team LeBron may refer to teams captained by basketball player LeBron James in:

- 2018 NBA All-Star Game
- 2019 NBA All-Star Game
- 2020 NBA All-Star Game
- 2021 NBA All-Star Game
- 2022 NBA All-Star Game
- 2023 NBA All-Star Game
