= 2019 NBA All-Star Game =

Exhibition basketball game played on February 17, 2019

	1	2	3	4	Total
Team LeBron	37	45	50	46	178
Team Giannis	53	42	36	33	164
- Date: February 17, 2019
- Arena: Spectrum Center
- City: Charlotte
- MVP: Kevin Durant (Team LeBron)
- National anthem: Anthony Hamilton (American); Carly Rae Jepsen (Canadian)
- Halftime show: J. Cole
- Network: TNT, TBS
- Announcers: Marv Albert, Reggie Miller, Chris Webber, and Kristen Ledlow (All-Star Game – TNT); Greg Anthony, Kevin Garnett, Charles Barkley, and Dennis Scott (All Star Game Players Only – TBS); Kevin Harlan, Reggie Miller, Chris Webber, Kenny Smith, Donovan Mitchell, Spencer Dinwiddie, and Allie LaForce (All-Star Saturday Night); Adam Lefkoe, Danny Green, Frank Kaminsky, and Rosalyn Gold-Onwude (Rising Stars Challenge)

NBA All-Star Game
< 2018	2020 >

The 2019 NBA All-Star Game was an exhibition basketball game that was played on February 17, 2019, during the National Basketball Association's (NBA) 2018–19 season. It was the 68th edition of the NBA All-Star Game, and was played at the Spectrum Center in Charlotte, North Carolina, at the home of the Charlotte Hornets. Team LeBron defeated Team Giannis, 178–164. This was the second time that the NBA All-Star Game format was not Eastern Conference versus Western Conference. Charlotte was announced as host on May 24, 2017. This was the second time that Charlotte hosted the All-Star Game; the first time was in 1991, at the Hornets' previous home arena Charlotte Coliseum.

Charlotte was originally selected to host the 2017 All-Star Game, but it was moved to New Orleans that year because of controversy surrounding North Carolina's Public Facilities Privacy & Security Act. The 2019 game was televised by TNT for the 17th straight year, while a special “Players Only” alternate telecast was aired on TBS.

== All-Star Game ==
=== Coaches ===
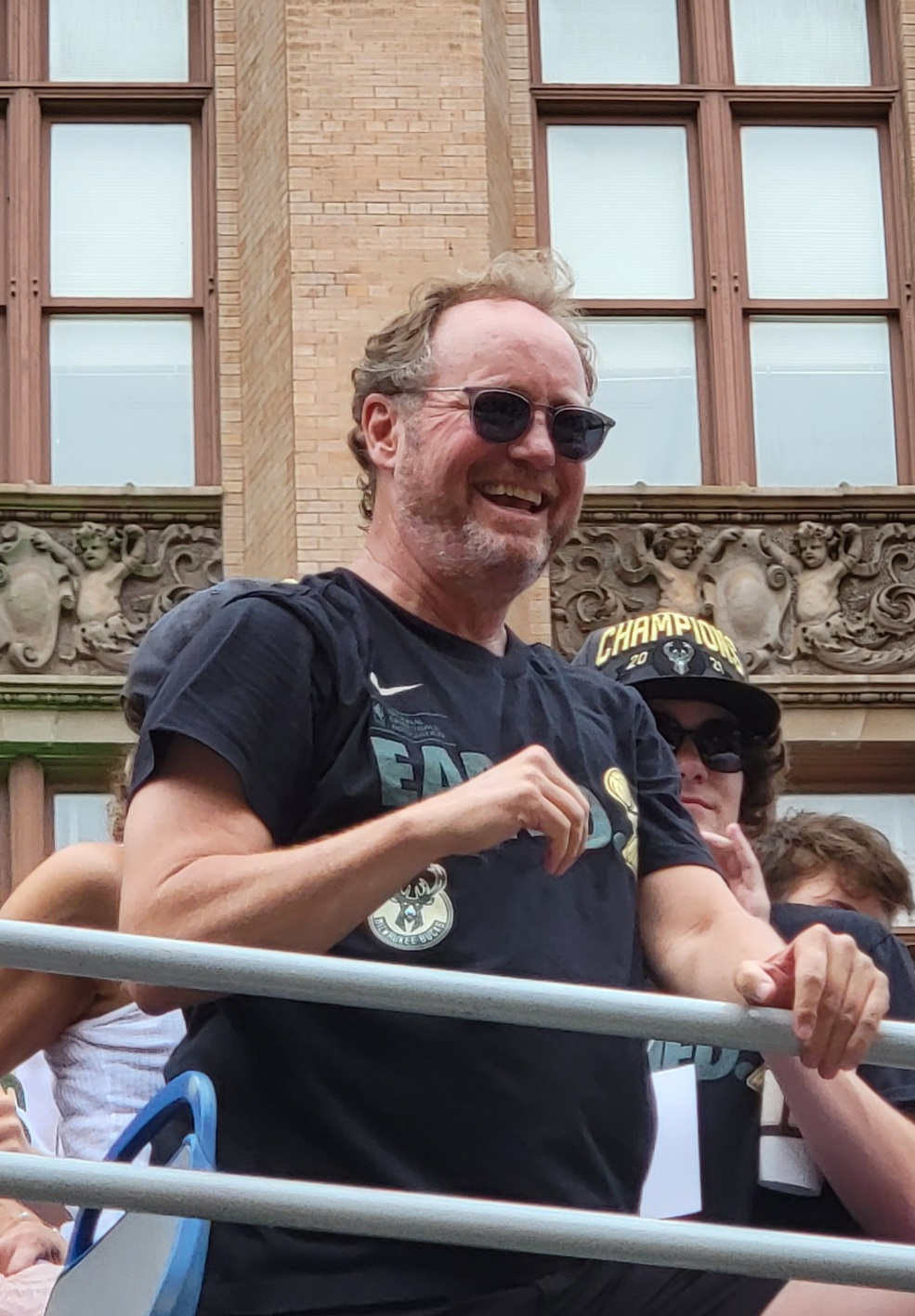
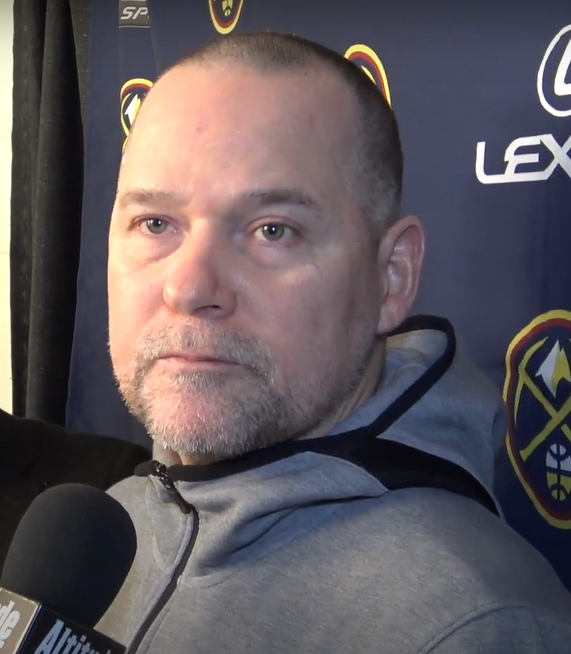
Mike Budenholzer (left) and Michael Malone (right) were selected as head coach for Team Giannis and Team LeBron, respectively.

The two teams were coached from their team captain's respective conference. Mike Budenholzer, head coach of the Eastern Conference leader Milwaukee Bucks, was named as the head coach for Team Giannis on February 1. Michael Malone, head coach of the Western Conference leader Denver Nuggets, was named as the head coach for Team LeBron on February 2.

=== Rosters ===
The rosters for the All-Star Game are selected through a voting process. The NBA partnered with Google and Twitter counting #nbavote hashtags as fan votes. The starters were chosen by the fans, media, and current NBA players. Fans made up 50% of the vote, and NBA players and media each comprised 25% of the vote. The two guards and three frontcourt players who received the highest cumulative vote totals were named the All-Star starters. NBA head coaches will vote for the reserves for their respective conferences, none of which can be players from their own team. Each coach selects two guards, three frontcourt players and two wild cards, with each selected player ranked in order of preference within each category. If a multi-position player is to be selected, coaches are encouraged to vote for the player at the position that was "most advantageous for the All-Star team", regardless of where the player was listed on the All-Star ballot or the position he was listed in box scores.

The All-Star Game starters were announced on January 24, 2019. Kyrie Irving of the Boston Celtics and Kemba Walker of the Charlotte Hornets were named the backcourt starters in the East, earning their sixth and third all-star appearances, respectively. Kawhi Leonard of the Toronto Raptors and Giannis Antetokounmpo of the Milwaukee Bucks were named the frontcourt starters in the East, both earning their third all-star appearances. Joining in the East frontcourt was Joel Embiid of the Philadelphia 76ers, his second selection.

Stephen Curry of the Golden State Warriors and James Harden of the Houston Rockets were named to the starting backcourt in the West, earning their sixth and seventh all-star appearances, respectively. In the frontcourt, Kevin Durant of the Golden State Warriors was named to his tenth career all-star game, along with Paul George of the Oklahoma City Thunder and LeBron James of the Los Angeles Lakers, their sixth and 15th all-star selections, respectively.

The All-Star Game reserves were announced on January 31, 2019. The West reserves included Russell Westbrook of the Oklahoma City Thunder, his eighth selection, Klay Thompson of the Golden State Warriors, his fifth selection, LaMarcus Aldridge of the San Antonio Spurs, his seventh selection, Damian Lillard of the Portland Trail Blazers, his fourth selection, Anthony Davis of the New Orleans Pelicans, his sixth selection, Nikola Jokić of the Denver Nuggets, his first selection, and Karl-Anthony Towns of the Minnesota Timberwolves, his second selection.

The East reserves included Kyle Lowry of the Toronto Raptors, his fifth selection, Khris Middleton of the Milwaukee Bucks, his first selection, Bradley Beal of the Washington Wizards, his second selection, Victor Oladipo of the Indiana Pacers, his second selection, Ben Simmons of the Philadelphia 76ers, his first selection, Nikola Vučević of the Orlando Magic, his first selection, and Blake Griffin of the Detroit Pistons, his sixth selection.

On February 1, 2019, Commissioner Adam Silver named Dwyane Wade and Dirk Nowitzki as special team roster additions for the game, citing their contributions to the sport. They were selected in the final round of the 2019 All-Star Draft, making each roster consist of 13 players.

- Italics indicates leading vote-getters per conference

Eastern Conference All-Stars
Pos	Player	Team	No. of selections
Starters
G	Kemba Walker	Charlotte Hornets	3
G	Kyrie Irving	Boston Celtics	6
F	Kawhi Leonard	Toronto Raptors	3
F	Giannis Antetokounmpo	Milwaukee Bucks	3
C	Joel Embiid	Philadelphia 76ers	2
Reserves
G	Kyle Lowry	Toronto Raptors	5
G	Victor Oladipo^{INJ1}	Indiana Pacers	2
F	Khris Middleton	Milwaukee Bucks	1
G	Bradley Beal	Washington Wizards	2
G	Ben Simmons	Philadelphia 76ers	1
F	Blake Griffin	Detroit Pistons	6
C	Nikola Vučević	Orlando Magic	1
G	Dwyane Wade^{SPL}	Miami Heat	13
G	D'Angelo Russell^{REP1}	Brooklyn Nets	1

Western Conference All-Stars
Pos	Player	Team	No. of selections
Starters
G	Stephen Curry	Golden State Warriors	6
G	James Harden	Houston Rockets	7
F	Kevin Durant	Golden State Warriors	10
F	Paul George	Oklahoma City Thunder	6
F	LeBron James	Los Angeles Lakers	15
Reserves
G	Russell Westbrook	Oklahoma City Thunder	8
G	Damian Lillard	Portland Trail Blazers	4
G	Klay Thompson	Golden State Warriors	5
F	Anthony Davis	New Orleans Pelicans	6
F	LaMarcus Aldridge	San Antonio Spurs	7
C	Nikola Jokić	Denver Nuggets	1
C	Karl-Anthony Towns	Minnesota Timberwolves	2
F	Dirk Nowitzki^{SPL}	Dallas Mavericks	14

^INJ1 Victor Oladipo was unable to play due to a knee injury.
^REP1 D'Angelo Russell was selected as Victor Oladipo's replacement.
^SPL Special roster addition.

=== Draft ===
The draft took place on February 7, 2019, and was televised by TNT. This was the first time that the All-Star Game Draft was televised, after the league was criticized for not televising the draft the previous year. LeBron James and Giannis Antetokounmpo were named as captains for receiving the most votes from the West and East, respectively. The first eight players drafted are starters. The next 14 players (seven from each conference) were chosen by NBA head coaches. The final two selections were selected from the special team roster additions to the game. NBA Commissioner Adam Silver will select the replacement for any player unable to participate in the All-Star Game, choosing a player from the same conference as the player who is being replaced. Silver's selection would join the team that drafted the replaced player. If a replaced player is a starter, the head coach of that team will choose a new starter from his cast of players instead.

James picked Kevin Durant with his first pick, and Antetokounmpo picked Stephen Curry second. After the draft, James traded 16th pick Russell Westbrook to Antetokounmpo for 13th pick Ben Simmons. Team Giannis was the home team due to the Eastern Conference having home team status for the game.

2019 All-Star Draft
Pick	Player	Team
1	Kevin Durant	LeBron
2	Stephen Curry	Giannis
3	Kyrie Irving	LeBron
4	Joel Embiid	Giannis
5	Kawhi Leonard	LeBron
6	Paul George	Giannis
7	James Harden	LeBron
8	Kemba Walker	Giannis
9	Khris Middleton	Giannis
10	Anthony Davis	LeBron
11	Nikola Jokić	Giannis
12	Klay Thompson	LeBron
13	Ben Simmons*	Giannis
14	Damian Lillard	LeBron
15	Blake Griffin	Giannis
16	Russell Westbrook*	LeBron
17	D'Angelo Russell	Giannis
18	LaMarcus Aldridge	LeBron
19	Nikola Vučević	Giannis
20	Karl-Anthony Towns	LeBron
21	Kyle Lowry	Giannis
22	Bradley Beal	LeBron
23	Dwyane Wade	LeBron
24	Dirk Nowitzki	Giannis

*Ben Simmons was traded to Team LeBron and Russell Westbrook went to Team Giannis.

=== Lineups ===
Team Giannis
Pos	Player	Team
Starters
C	Joel Embiid	Philadelphia 76ers
F	Giannis Antetokounmpo	Milwaukee Bucks
F/G	Paul George	Oklahoma City Thunder
G	Stephen Curry	Golden State Warriors
G	Kemba Walker	Charlotte Hornets
Reserves
G/F	Khris Middleton	Milwaukee Bucks
C	Nikola Jokic	Denver Nuggets
G	Russell Westbrook	Oklahoma City Thunder
F	Blake Griffin	Detroit Pistons
G	D’Angelo Russell	Brooklyn Nets
C	Nikola Vucevic	Orlando Magic
G	Kyle Lowry	Toronto Raptors
F/C	Dirk Nowitzki	Dallas Mavericks
Head coach: Mike Budenholzer (Milwaukee Bucks)

Team LeBron
Pos	Player	Team
Starters
F	Kevin Durant	Golden State Warriors
F	LeBron James	Los Angeles Lakers
F/G	Kawhi Leonard	Toronto Raptors
G	James Harden	Houston Rockets
G	Kyrie Irving	Boston Celtics
Reserves
F/C	Anthony Davis	New Orleans Pelicans
G	Klay Thompson	Golden State Warriors
G	Damian Lillard	Portland Trail Blazers
G/F	Ben Simmons	Philadelphia 76ers
F/C	LaMarcus Aldridge	San Antonio Spurs
C	Karl-Anthony Towns	Minnesota Timberwolves
G	Bradley Beal	Washington Wizards
G	Dwyane Wade	Miami Heat
Head coach: Michael Malone (Denver Nuggets)

=== Game ===
TNT, TBS

February 17, 2019
8:30 pm ET

Recap

Team LeBron 178, Team Giannis 164
Scoring by quarter: 37–53, 45–42, 50–36, 46–33
Pts: Kevin Durant 31; Rebs: Kyrie Irving 9 Asts: Ben Simmons 7	Pts: Giannis Antetokounmpo 38; Rebs: Joel Embiid 12; Asts: Kemba Walker 8

Spectrum Center, Charlotte, North Carolina
Referees:
- #48 Scott Foster
- #16 David Guthrie
- #74 Curtis Blair

== All-Star Weekend ==
=== NBA on TNT American Express Road Show ===
The 2019 All-Star Weekend began on Thursday, February 14, 2019, with the annual NBA on TNT American Express Road Show, a live broadcast of Inside the NBA that took place at The Fillmore Charlotte in Charlotte, North Carolina, and was hosted by Ernie Johnson Jr., Charles Barkley, Kenny Smith and Shaquille O'Neal, with special performances by Chris Tucker (Thursday) and Rae Sremmurd (Friday).

=== Celebrity Game ===
The 2019 NBA All-Star Celebrity Game was played on Friday, February 15, 2019, at the Bojangles' Coliseum in Charlotte, North Carolina. The Home team featured personnel who either was born, raised, and/or played in North Carolina or South Carolina. Both teams had one "Hometown Hero" on their roster honoring exemplary citizens who rose to the occasion to help save others in the time of need. Playing for the Home Team was Jason Weinmann, a 47-year-old U.S. Marine who used his own military transport vehicle to rescue New Bern, North Carolina residents stranded during Hurricane Florence in 2018. Playing for the Away Team was James Shaw Jr., a 29-year-old electrical technician who disarmed a gunman armed with an AR-15 style rifle during the Nashville Waffle House shooting in Antioch, Tennessee. The 2019 Celebrity All-Star Game MVP was won by Famous Los, who scored 22 points, 2 rebounds, and 3 assists.

ESPN

February 15, 2019
7:00 pm ET

Away Team 80, Home Team 82
Scoring by quarter: 22–30, 25–21, 7–21, 26–10
Pts: Quavo 27; Rebs: Quavo, Allen 9	Pts: Famous Los 22; Rebs: Colter 6

Bojangles' Coliseum, Charlotte, North Carolina

Away
Player	Background
Ronnie 2K	Director of influencer marketing, 2K Sports
Ray Allen	Former NBA Player
AJ Buckley	Actor
Bad Bunny	Rapper
Stefanie Dolson (2)	WNBA player
Marc Lasry (4)	Milwaukee Bucks owner
Hasan Minhaj (2)	Actor, comedian
Quavo (2)	Rapper, recording artist
Adam Ray	About Last Night host
Amanda Seales	Actor, comedian, recording artist
James Shaw Jr.	Hometown hero
Brad Williams	About Last Night host
Head coach: Sue Bird (WNBA player)
Assistant coach: Monté Morris (NBA player)

Home
Player	Background
Mike Colter	Actor (Luke Cage)
Chris Daughtry	Singer, Daughtry
Terrence Jenkins (5)	TV personality, actor
Famous Los	Comedian, social media influencer
Dr. Oz (2)	TV personality
Rapsody	Rapper
Bo Rinehart	Musician, NEEDTOBREATHE
J.B. Smoove (2)	Actor, comedian (Curb Your Enthusiasm)
Steve Smith	Former NFL player
A'ja Wilson	WNBA player
Jay Williams	ESPN analyst, former NBA player
Jason Weismann	Hometown hero
Head coach: Dawn Staley (South Carolina Gamecocks women's basketball head coach)
Assistant coach: Lisa Boyer (South Carolina Gamecocks women's basketball associate head coach)

=== Rising Stars Challenge ===
Team World
Pos.	Nat.	Player	Team	R/S
F	(United Kingdom)	OG Anunoby	Toronto Raptors	Sophomore
C	(The Bahamas)	Deandre Ayton	Phoenix Suns	Rookie
G	(Serbia)	Bogdan Bogdanović	Sacramento Kings	Sophomore
G/F	(Slovenia)	Luka Dončić	Dallas Mavericks	Rookie
G	(Canada)	Shai Gilgeous-Alexander	Los Angeles Clippers	Rookie
F	(Latvia)	Rodions Kurucs	Brooklyn Nets	Rookie
F	(Finland)	Lauri Markkanen	Chicago Bulls	Sophomore
G	(Nigeria)	Josh Okogie	Minnesota Timberwolves	Rookie
G/F	(Turkey)	Cedi Osman	Cleveland Cavaliers	Sophomore
G/F	(Australia)	Ben Simmons	Philadelphia 76ers	Sophomore
Head coach: Wes Unseld Jr. (Denver Nuggets)
Assistant coach: (Germany) Dirk Nowitzki (Dallas Mavericks)

Team USA
Pos.	Player	Team	R/S
C	Jarrett Allen	Brooklyn Nets	Sophomore
F	Marvin Bagley III	Sacramento Kings	Rookie
G	Lonzo Ball^{INJ}	Los Angeles Lakers	Sophomore
F	John Collins	Atlanta Hawks	Sophomore
G	De'Aaron Fox	Sacramento Kings	Sophomore
F/C	Jaren Jackson Jr.	Memphis Grizzlies	Rookie
F	Kevin Knox II^{REP}	New York Knicks	Rookie
F	Kyle Kuzma	Los Angeles Lakers	Sophomore
G	Donovan Mitchell	Utah Jazz	Sophomore
F	Jayson Tatum	Boston Celtics	Sophomore
G	Trae Young	Atlanta Hawks	Rookie
Head coach: Darvin Ham (Milwaukee Bucks)
Assistant coach: Kyrie Irving (Boston Celtics)

^INJ Lonzo Ball was unable to participate due to a left ankle injury.
^REP Kevin Knox was selected as Lonzo Ball's replacement.

TNT

February 15
9:00 pm ET

Boxscore

Team World 144, Team USA 161
Scoring by half: 71–83, 73–78
Pts: Ben Simmons 28; Rebs: Deandre Ayton 8 Asts: Luka Dončić 9	Pts: Kyle Kuzma 35; Rebs: Jayson Tatum 9 Asts: De'Aaron Fox 16

Spectrum Center, Charlotte, North Carolina
Referees:
- #27 Mitchell Ervin
- #50 Gediminas Petraitis
- #51 Aaron Smith

=== Skills Challenge ===
Contestants
Pos.	Player	Team	Height	Weight
G	Mike Conley Jr.	Memphis Grizzlies	6–1	175
G/F	Luka Dončić	Dallas Mavericks	6–7	218
G	De'Aaron Fox	Sacramento Kings	6–3	175
C	Nikola Jokić	Denver Nuggets	7–0	250
F	Kyle Kuzma	Los Angeles Lakers	6–9	220
F	Jayson Tatum	Boston Celtics	6–8	208
C	Nikola Vučević	Orlando Magic	7–0	260
G	Trae Young	Atlanta Hawks	6–2	180

Quarterfinals
Nikola Jokić (Denver)	O
Nikola Vučević (Orlando)	X
Mike Conley Jr. (Memphis)	X
Jayson Tatum (Boston)	O
De'Aaron Fox (Sacramento)	X
Trae Young (Atlanta)	O
Luka Dončić (Dallas)	O
Kyle Kuzma (LA Lakers)	X

Semifinals
Nikola Jokić (Denver)	X
Jayson Tatum (Boston)	O
Trae Young (Atlanta)	O
Luka Dončić (Dallas)	X

Finals
Jayson Tatum (Boston)	O
Trae Young (Atlanta)	X

=== Three Point Contest ===
Contestants
Pos.	Player	Team	Height	Weight	First round	Final round
G/F	Joe Harris	Brooklyn Nets	6–6	218	25	26
G	Stephen Curry	Golden State Warriors	6–3	190	27	24
G	Buddy Hield	Sacramento Kings	6–4	214	26	19
G/F	Danny Green	Toronto Raptors	6–6	215	23	DNQ
G	Devin Booker	Phoenix Suns	6–6	210	23	DNQ
G	Damian Lillard	Portland Trail Blazers	6–3	195	17	DNQ
F/C	Dirk Nowitzki	Dallas Mavericks	7–0	245	17	DNQ
G	Seth Curry	Portland Trail Blazers	6–2	185	16	DNQ
G	Kemba Walker	Charlotte Hornets	6–1	184	15	DNQ
G/F	Khris Middleton	Milwaukee Bucks	6–8	222	11	DNQ

=== Slam Dunk Contest ===
Contestants
Pos.	Player	Team	Height	Weight	First round	Final round
G	Hamidou Diallo	Oklahoma City Thunder	6–5	198	98 (48+50)	88 (43+45)
G	Dennis Smith Jr.	New York Knicks	6–3	195	95 (45+50)	85 (35+50)
F	Miles Bridges	Charlotte Hornets	6–7	225	83 (33+50)	DNQ
F	John Collins	Atlanta Hawks	6–10	234	82 (40+42)	DNQ
