= Spencer Dinwiddie =

American basketball player (born 1993)

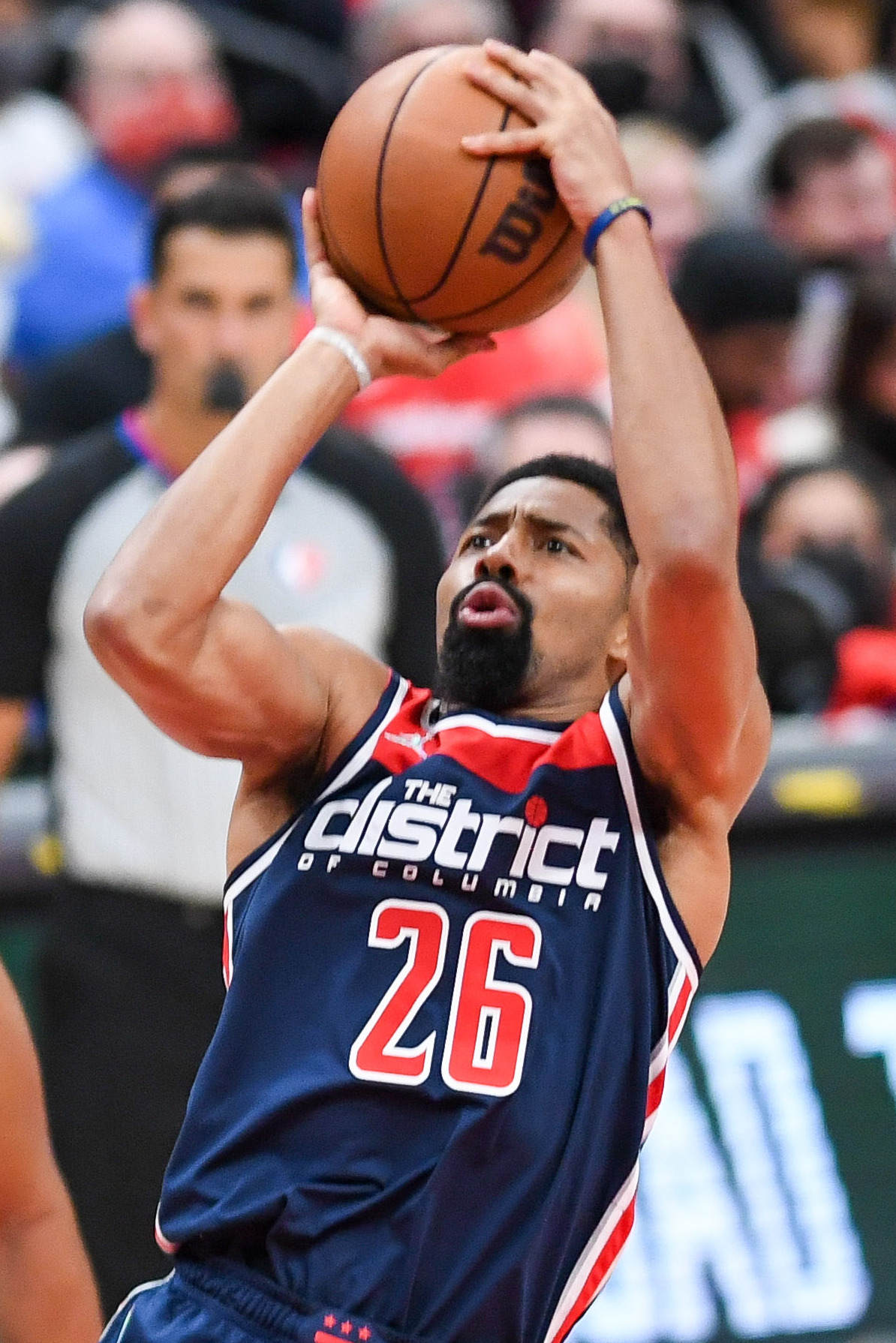
- Dinwiddie with the Washington Wizards in 2022

Free agent
- Position: Point guard / shooting guard

Personal information
- Born: April 6, 1993 (age 33) Los Angeles, California, U.S.
- Listed height: 6 ft 5 in (1.96 m)
- Listed weight: 215 lb (98 kg)

Career information
- High school: William Howard Taft (Woodland Hills, California)
- College: Colorado (2011–2014)
- NBA draft: 2014: 2nd round, 38th overall pick
- Drafted by: Detroit Pistons
- Playing career: 2014–present

Career history
- 2014–2016: Detroit Pistons
- 2014–2016: →Grand Rapids Drive
- 2016: Windy City Bulls
- 2016–2021: Brooklyn Nets
- 2021–2022: Washington Wizards
- 2022–2023: Dallas Mavericks
- 2023–2024: Brooklyn Nets
- 2024: Los Angeles Lakers
- 2024–2025: Dallas Mavericks
- 2025: Bayern Munich

Career highlights
- First-team All-Pac-12 (2013)
- Stats at NBA.com
- Stats at Basketball Reference

Spencer Gray Dinwiddie (born April 6, 1993) is an American professional basketball player who last played for FC Bayern Munich of the Basketball Bundesliga (BBL) and the EuroLeague. He played college basketball for the Colorado Buffaloes and earned first-team all-conference honors in the Pac-12 as a sophomore in 2013. He missed most of his junior year after injuring his anterior cruciate ligament (ACL).

Dinwiddie recovered and was selected by the Detroit Pistons in the second round of the 2014 NBA draft. After two seasons with the Pistons, he joined the Brooklyn Nets in December 2016 and played with them until being traded to the Washington Wizards in 2021. In February 2022, Dinwiddie was traded to the Dallas Mavericks and in 2023, he was traded back to the Brooklyn Nets and was traded to the Toronto Raptors the following year in February 2024 before being immediately waived by Toronto. He signed with the Los Angeles Lakers for the remainder of the season in a bench role.

== High school career ==
At William Howard Taft High School, Dinwiddie was recognized as one of the greatest standout athletes since Jordan Farmar. He averaged 5.9 points and 4.1 assists as the starting point guard alongside a fellow 2014 draftee in DeAndre Daniels at the conclusion of his junior season. Dinwiddie maximized his game as he began his final year representing the school, averaging 11.2 points and 7.7 assists. He was one of the most skilled passers in school history, and became the John R. Wooden California High School Player of the Year in 2011. However, Long Beach Poly's Ryan Anderson was named California Mr. Basketball. Dinwiddie became just one of seven players that won the prestigious award as a senior. The powerful duo of Daniels and Dinwiddie won the city championship this season as well. This final season at Taft helped Dinwiddie gain the attention of colleges around the country. He chose to attend Colorado rather than Harvard, Oregon, Santa Clara, or UNLV.

Considered a three-star recruit by Rivals.com, Dinwiddie was listed as the No. 25-point guard and the No. 146 player in the nation in 2011.

== College career ==
=== Freshman season (2011–2012) ===
In the first regular season game for Colorado, Dinwiddie made his collegiate debut in a 32-point victory over Fort Lewis with seven points and seven rebounds. He shot just 2-for-9 from the field. Dinwiddie reached double figures in his sixth appearance, which was against Georgia. This was the first time he had shot over .500 on field goals up till then. The California native led the team to this win and made three key free throws in the final seconds. Dinwiddie teamed with fellow freshman Askia Booker, forming another duo on his new team. They combined for 677 points, making school history by scoring over 250 points each. At the conclusion of the season, they were the only Buffaloes to do so. Dinwiddie became a member of the Pac-12 Conference Tournament Championship Team. He led Colorado in free throw percentage and ranked third among freshmen in that category. By the end of the regular season, Dinwiddie had helped the team earn its first NCAA men's basketball tournament berth since the 2002–03 season. Shooting three -pointers at a .438 clip, Dinwiddie was named to the Pac-12 All-Freshman Team with Tony Wroten. He was the only Pac-12 freshman to have a field-goal percentage of over .400 total.

=== Sophomore season (2012–2013) ===
The departures of Carlon Brown and Nate Tomlinson were instrumental in Dinwiddie's breakout sophomore season, when he earned first-team All-Pac-12 honors. Leading the team in assists, they reached the NCAA men's basketball tournament for the second consecutive season, in which they reached the second round. It was the first time the team had reached back-to-back tournaments since the 1963 season. The Buffaloes won the 2012 Charleston Classic, in which Dinwiddie took the role as starting small forward in the final three rounds. He was just one of two players – the other being Askia Booker – to start all 33 games. By the end of the season, Booker and Dinwiddie became the highest sophomore scoring tandem in school history. Dinwiddie led the team in assists 20 times and was the top scorer on 15 different occasions. He recorded 29 points in a home win over Colorado State, which marked his own career-high scoring record. On February 10, 2012, Dinwiddie recorded a perfect game against Oregon State. He shot 6-for-6 from the field, 4-for-4 from beyond the arc, and 8-for-8 on free throws. This set the school record for most points scored without missing a single shot. He made the remark, "I see over people and I shoot over people... for the smaller point guards, they don't really get to contest me." The Taft graduate stood 6 ft 6 in (1.98 m) by the end of the season.

=== Junior season (2013–2014) ===
Dinwiddie continued to act as the leader of the Colorado Buffaloes men's basketball team through the beginning of his junior year. He helped the team win 14 of their first 16 regular season games, which made them one of the most successful underdogs in the country, most notably toppling the Kansas Jayhawks due to a game-winner from Askia Booker. Dinwiddie was considered the catalyst for the unanticipated run from his team, however. On November 21, 2012, he shot a career-best 14-for-15 from the free throw line against Santa Barbara. Colorado won each game in which their top scorer scored 20 or more points total.

On January 12, 2014, Dinwiddie suffered a career-threatening ACL injury against Washington, forcing him to sit out for the remainder of the season. As his junior season was cut short, the team finished the year just 23–12; their record was 14–2 while Dinwiddie was healthy. Dinwiddie reportedly made contact with Russ Paine, who helped Adrian Peterson recover from his ACL injury and become the 2012 NFL MVP.

On April 24, 2014, Dinwiddie declared for the NBA draft, foregoing his final year of college eligibility.

== Professional career ==
=== Detroit Pistons (2014–2016) ===
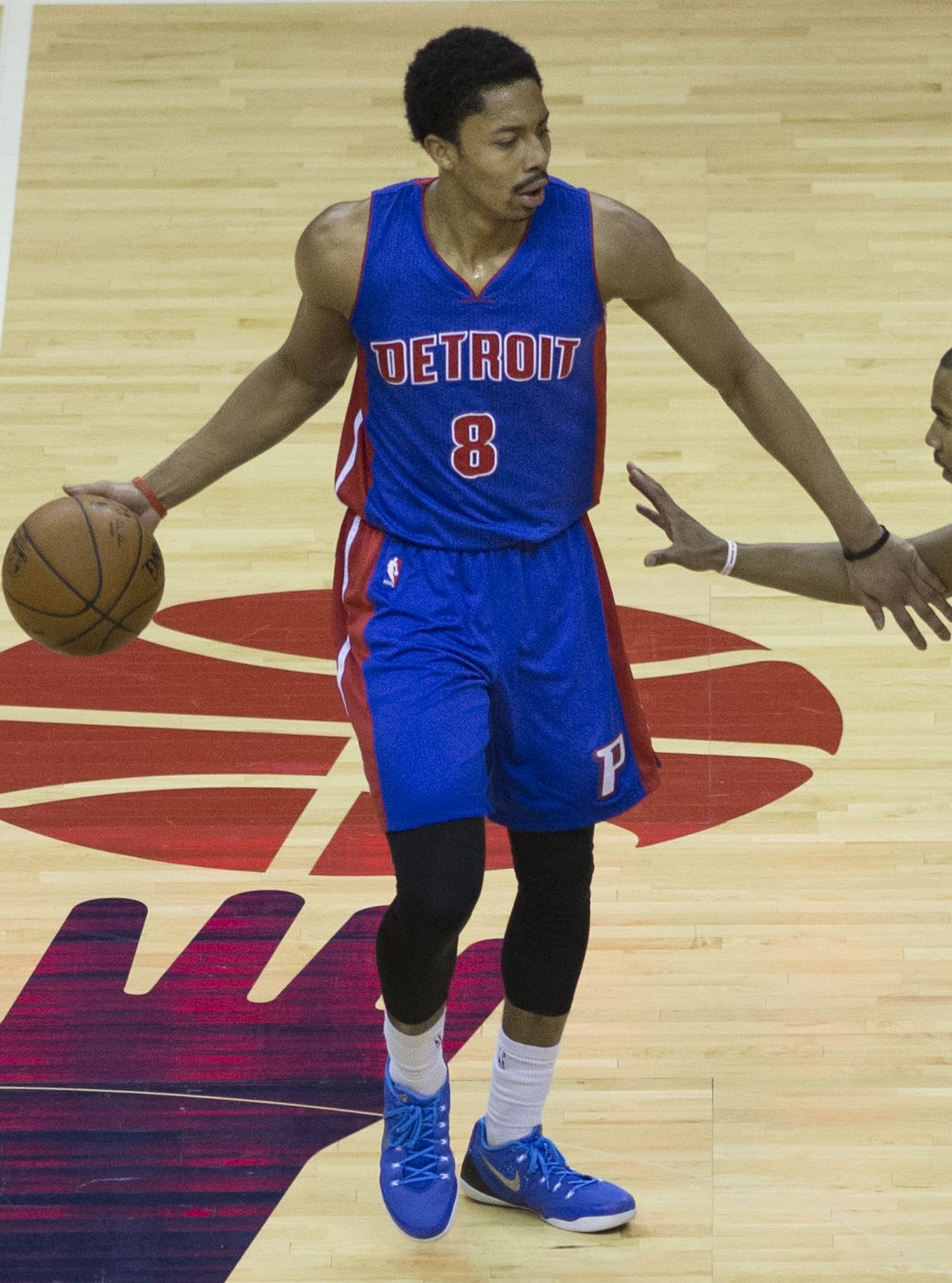
Dinwiddie with the Pistons in February 2015

Dinwiddie was selected with the 38th overall pick by the Detroit Pistons in the 2014 NBA draft. He appeared in 34 games for the Pistons as a rookie, making one start and receiving two assignments to the Grand Rapids Drive, the Pistons' D-League affiliate. His lone start came on February 20, 2015, after a pair of trades left the Pistons short-handed. He had career highs of 12 points and nine assists in a 100–91 win over the Chicago Bulls. Eight days later, he scored a season-best 20 points to go with eight assists in 25 minutes off the bench in a 99–95 loss to the Washington Wizards.

The 2015–16 season saw Dinwiddie appear in just 12 regular-season games for the Pistons, after spending the majority of the season in the D-League with the Grand Rapids Drive. After back-up Steve Blake opened the season in a shooting slump, Dinwiddie received his first opportunity of the season in the tenth game, scoring 17 points on November 15 in a 97–85 loss to the Los Angeles Lakers. However, after struggling in the next four games, he fell out of the rotation, compounded by Blake's form improvement and Brandon Jennings returning from injury. Dinwiddie played a season-high 29 minutes in the Pistons' regular-season finale on April 13, scoring 12 points in a 112–110 overtime win over the Cleveland Cavaliers. He then appeared in game two of the Pistons' 4–0 first-round playoff series loss to the Cavaliers.

=== Windy City Bulls (2016) ===
On June 17, 2016, Dinwiddie was traded to the Chicago Bulls in exchange for Cameron Bairstow. He was waived by the Bulls on July 7, re-signed on July 28, and waived again on October 21 after appearing in five preseason games. He then spent the start of the 2016–17 season with Chicago's D-League affiliate team, the Windy City Bulls, averaging 19.4 points, 8.1 assists and 3.7 rebounds over 37.4 minutes in nine games.

=== Brooklyn Nets (2016–2021) ===
On December 8, 2016, Dinwiddie signed with the Brooklyn Nets. On February 15, 2017, he scored 15 of his season-high 19 points in the fourth quarter of the Nets' 129–125 loss to the Milwaukee Bucks. On April 8, 2017, in a 107–106 win over the Chicago Bulls, Dinwiddie made four free throws in the final 13.6 seconds and finished with 19 points.

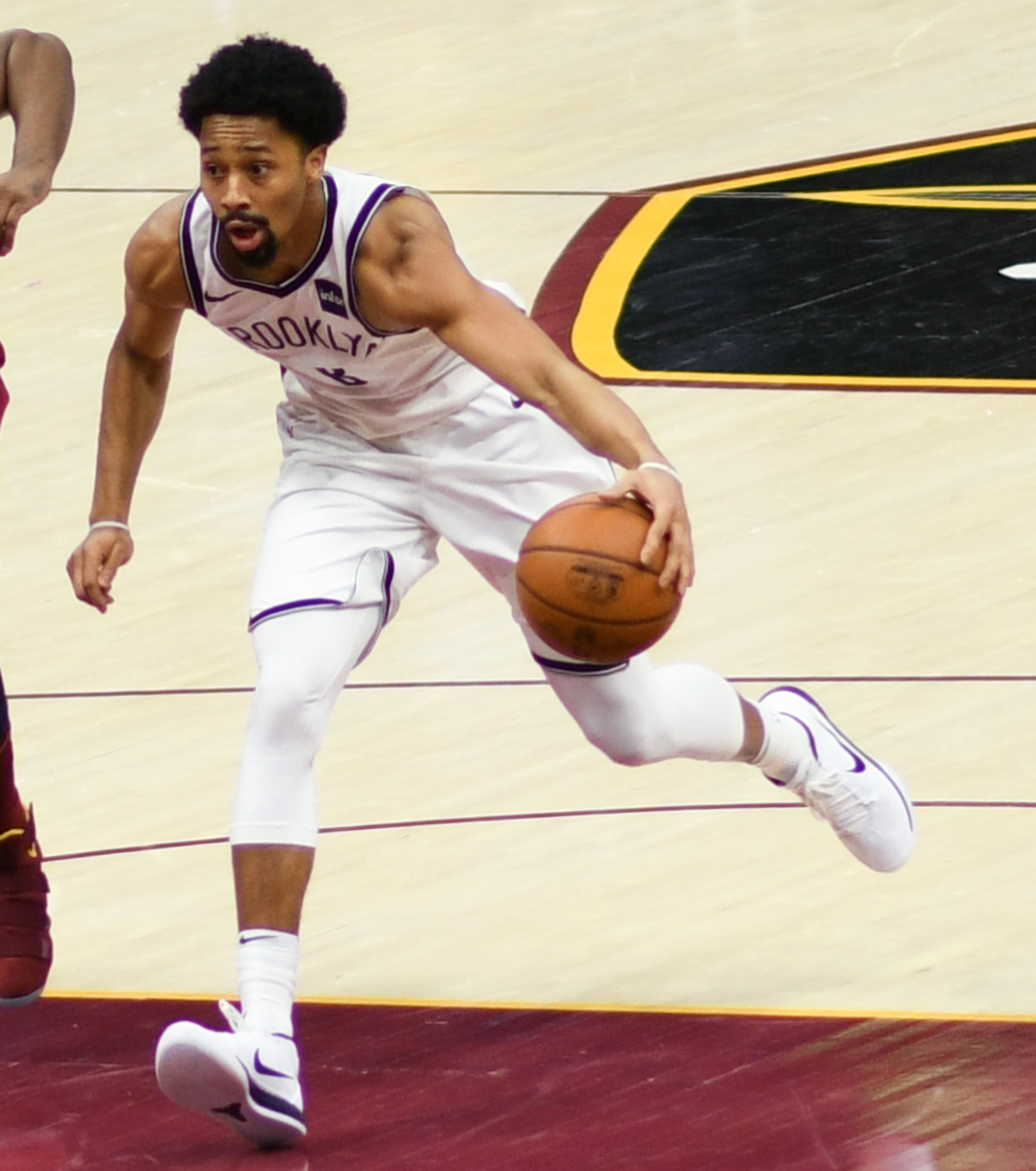
Dinwiddie in 2018

On October 25, 2017, Dinwiddie scored a career-high 22 points and hit the go-ahead 3-pointer with 43 seconds left to lift the Nets to a 112–107 win over the Cleveland Cavaliers. On October 29, he tied his career high with 22 points in a 124–111 loss to the Denver Nuggets. On November 17, he set a new career high with 25 points in a 118–107 win over the Utah Jazz. On December 14, he had 26 points in a 111–104 loss to the New York Knicks. On December 23, he tied his career high with 26 points in a 123–119 overtime loss to the Indiana Pacers. On January 3, 2018, he made the go-ahead jumper with 10.1 seconds left and tied his career high with 26 points, leading Brooklyn to a 98–97 victory over the Minnesota Timberwolves. On January 8, he set a new career high with 31 points in a 114–113 overtime loss to the Toronto Raptors. On January 12, he recorded a near triple-double with 20 points, 10 assists and nine rebounds in a 110–105 win over the Atlanta Hawks. On January 17, he had a career-high 13 assists in a 100–95 loss to the San Antonio Spurs. On February 17, Dinwiddie won the Skills Challenge at All-Star Weekend.

On November 25, 2018, Dinwiddie scored 31 points in a 127–125 loss to the Philadelphia 76ers. On December 12, he scored a career-high 39 points in a 127–124 win over the 76ers. On December 13, he signed a reported three-year, $34 million contract extension with the Nets. On December 26, he had 37 points and 11 assists off the bench in a 134–132 double-overtime win over the Charlotte Hornets. It was his third 30-point game off the bench, matching the franchise record set by Clifford T. Robinson in 1980–81. On January 16, 2019, he scored 25 of his 33 points in the fourth quarter and overtime of the Nets' 145–142 win over the Houston Rockets. On January 23, he scored a game-high 29 points in a 114–110 win over the Orlando Magic, thus scoring at least 25 points off the bench in 10 games, matching a franchise single-season record—Bubbles Hawkins set the mark during the Nets' inaugural NBA season in 1976–77. Two days later, it was revealed that a right thumb injury that he had originally hurt roughly two months earlier and had gotten progressively worse would require surgery, having suffered torn ligaments. He underwent surgery on January 28. He returned to action on March 1 after missing 14 games, scoring 15 points off the bench in a 123–112 loss to the Hornets. With 28 points against the Cavaliers on March 6, Dinwiddie had his 14th 20-point game off the bench to set a Nets single-season record—Darryl Dawkins, Purvis Short and Orlando Woolridge all had 13. With 23 points against the Hawks on March 9, Dinwiddie surpassed Armen Gilliam in 1993–94 with the most single-season points in a reserve role.

During the 2019–20 NBA season, Dinwiddie began the season as a reserve until Kyrie Irving injured his shoulder. On January 28, 2020, Dinwiddie switched his jersey number from 8 to 26 after the approval of the NBA, in honor of the late Kobe Bryant. On June 29, 2020, Dinwiddie announced that he had tested positive for COVID-19.

On December 27, 2020, Dinwiddie left a game between the Nets and the Charlotte Hornets with a suspected right knee strain, which was later revealed to be a season-ending partial ACL tear.

=== Washington Wizards (2021–2022) ===
On August 6, 2021, Dinwiddie was acquired by the Washington Wizards via a sign-and-trade deal involving five teams, sending Russell Westbrook to the Los Angeles Lakers. Dinwiddie signed a three-year deal worth $54 million and a maximum of $60 million through incentives. He made his Wizards debut on October 20, logging 13 points, four rebounds and six assists in a 98–83 win over the Toronto Raptors. On October 22, Dinwiddie scored 34 points, alongside six rebounds and nine assists, in a 135–134 overtime win over the Indiana Pacers.

=== Dallas Mavericks (2022–2023) ===
On February 10, 2022, Dinwiddie was traded, along with Dāvis Bertāns, to the Dallas Mavericks in exchange for Kristaps Porziņģis and a protected 2022 second-round pick. On March 5, Dinwiddie scored a season-high 36 points in a 114–113 win over the Sacramento Kings. On April 16, during Game 1 of the first round of the playoffs, he logged 22 points and eight assists in a 93–99 loss to the Utah Jazz. The Mavericks won the series in six games and faced the Phoenix Suns during the second round. On May 15, Dinwiddie recorded 30 points, three rebounds and two assists in a 123–90 Game 7 win over the top-seeded Suns. The Mavericks advanced to the Western Conference Finals for the first time since 2011 and faced the Golden State Warriors. However, the Mavericks were eliminated by the Warriors in five games, despite a 26-point, four-assist and two-block performance by Dinwiddie in a 120–110 Game 5 loss.

On November 10, 2022, Dinwiddie scored 33 points, alongside four rebounds and six assists, in a 113–105 loss to the Washington Wizards. On January 26, 2023, he scored a season-high 36 points, alongside six rebounds and nine assists, in a 99–95 win over the Phoenix Suns. Two days later, Dinwiddie recorded 35 points, four rebounds and eight assists in a 108–100 loss to the Utah Jazz.

=== Return to Brooklyn (2023–2024) ===
On February 6, 2023, Dinwiddie was traded back to the Brooklyn Nets, along with Dorian Finney-Smith, an unprotected 2029 first-round pick, and second-round picks in 2027 and 2029, in exchange for Kyrie Irving and Markieff Morris.

On February 8, 2024, Dinwiddie was traded to the Toronto Raptors, in exchange for Dennis Schröder and Thaddeus Young. Following the trade, he was waived by Toronto.

=== Los Angeles Lakers (2024) ===
On February 10, 2024, Dinwiddie signed with the Los Angeles Lakers on a one-year deal worth the league minimum. On March 24, 2024, Dinwiddie scored a team high 26 points, alongside two rebounds and five assists, in a 150–145 win against the Indiana Pacers.

=== Second stint with Dallas (2024–2025) ===
On August 3, 2024, Dinwiddie returned to the Dallas Mavericks. He made 79 appearances (30 starts) for the Mavericks, averaging 11.0 points, 2.6 rebounds, and 4.4 assists.

On July 13, 2025, Dinwiddie signed a one-year, $3.6 million contract with the Charlotte Hornets. He was waived by the Hornets on October 16.

=== FC Bayern Munich (2025) ===
On October 23, 2025, Dinwiddie signed a contract without a release-clause with the FC Bayern Munich of the Basketball Bundesliga for the remainder of the season. His contract was terminated on January 4, 2026 by mutual consent, due to Dinwiddie desiring to travel back to the U.S. to attend to a family member who was sick.

== National team career ==
In 2013, Dinwiddie was named to the USA Basketball Men's World University Games Team for the 2013 Summer Universiade in Kazan, Russia. He was one of three players on Team USA to start all eight games. He averaged 7.9 points and 2.6 rebounds per game and led Team USA with 44 assists (5.5 apg) and with 12 steals (1.5 spg).

On April 19, 2020, Dinwiddie (whose father is from Nigeria) confirmed reports that he wanted to represent the Nigerian national team.

== Career statistics ==
Legend
GP	Games played	GS	Games started	MPG	Minutes per game
FG%	Field goal percentage	3P%	3-point field goal percentage	FT%	Free throw percentage
RPG	Rebounds per game	APG	Assists per game	SPG	Steals per game
BPG	Blocks per game	PPG	Points per game	**Bold**	Career high

=== NBA ===
==== Regular season ====
Year	Team	GP	GS	MPG	FG%	3P%	FT%	RPG	APG	SPG	BPG	PPG
2014–15	Detroit	34	1	13.4	.302	.185	.912	1.4	3.1	.6	.2	4.3
2015–16	Detroit	12	0	13.3	.352	.100	.576	1.4	1.8	.3	.0	4.8
2016–17	Brooklyn	59	18	22.6	.444	.376	.792	2.8	3.1	.7	.4	7.3
2017–18	Brooklyn	**80**	**58**	28.8	.387	.326	.813	3.2	6.6	.9	.3	12.6
2018–19	Brooklyn	68	4	28.1	.442	.335	.806	2.4	4.6	.6	.3	16.8
2019–20	Brooklyn	64	49	31.2	.415	.308	.778	3.5	6.8	.6	.3	**20.6**
2020–21	Brooklyn	3	3	21.4	.375	.286	**1.000**	4.3	3.0	.7	.3	6.7
2021–22	Washington	44	44	30.2	.376	.310	.811	**4.7**	5.8	.6	.2	12.6
2021–22	Dallas	23	7	28.3	**.498**	.404	.725	3.1	3.9	.7	.3	15.8
2022–23	Dallas	53	53	34.1	.455	**.405**	.821	3.1	5.3	.7	.3	17.7
2022–23	Brooklyn	26	26	**35.3**	.404	.289	.797	4.1	**9.1**	**1.1**	.3	16.5
2023–24	Brooklyn	48	48	30.7	.391	.320	.781	3.3	6.0	.8	.2	12.6
2023–24	L.A. Lakers	28	4	24.2	.397	.389	.880	1.7	2.4	.5	**.5**	6.8
2024–25	Dallas	79	30	27.0	.416	.334	.802	2.6	4.4	.9	.2	11.0
Career		621	345	27.7	.414	.333	.796	3.0	5.1	.7	.3	13.0

==== Playoffs ====
Year	Team	GP	GS	MPG	FG%	3P%	FT%	RPG	APG	SPG	BPG	PPG
2016	Detroit	1	0	1.7	**1.000**	—	—	.0	1.0	.0	.0	2.0
2019	Brooklyn	5	0	26.3	.435	.375	.714	2.6	1.6	.4	.0	14.6
2022	Dallas	**18**	3	27.8	.417	**.417**	**.821**	2.4	3.6	.8	**.3**	14.2
2023	Brooklyn	4	**4**	**39.8**	.431	.389	.682	**3.3**	**6.5**	**1.3**	**.3**	**16.5**
2024	L.A. Lakers	5	0	14.6	.357	.250	.500	1.4	1.6	.4	.2	3.0
Career		33	7	26.3	.422	.397	.761	2.3	3.3	.7	.2	12.5

=== College ===
Year	Team	GP	GS	MPG	FG%	3P%	FT%	RPG	APG	SPG	BPG	PPG
2011–12	Colorado	**36**	**36**	27.4	.402	**.438**	.816	**3.6**	1.8	.8	.3	10.0
2012–13	Colorado	33	33	**32.5**	.415	.338	.825	3.2	3.0	1.3	**.5**	**15.3**
2013–14	Colorado	17	17	31.1	**.466**	.413	**.857**	3.1	**3.8**	**1.5**	.2	14.7
Career		86	86	30.1	.420	.386	.830	3.3	2.6	1.1	.3	13.0

== Personal life ==
Dinwiddie is the son of Malcolm and Stephanie Dinwiddie, and has a younger brother, Taylor. Dinwiddie's girlfriend, Arielle Roberson – with whom he has two sons – is the sister of former NBA player André Roberson.

== Signature shoe and independent brand ==
In 2018, Spencer Dinwiddie launched his own independent sneaker brand, K8IROS (pronounced "Kairos"), making him one of the few active NBA players to create and wear a self-branded signature shoe on court. The brand name is derived from the Greek word for “opportune time,” reflecting Dinwiddie’s entrepreneurial mindset and desire to control his own brand identity.

K8IROS sneakers were designed to be performance-ready while also offering players and fans an alternative to traditional sneaker endorsement deals. Dinwiddie wore K8IROS models throughout NBA games, using the shoes as a platform to express personal messages, support causes, and showcase custom artwork.

His move toward independent sneaker development has been noted as part of a broader trend among athletes seeking more creative and financial autonomy within the sportswear industry.

In 2021, Dinwiddie partnered with Chinese sportswear brand 361°, becoming one of its leading global basketball ambassadors. Under this collaboration, Dinwiddie continued to develop and wear signature sneakers, with some models incorporating design DNA from his K8IROS line. The partnership allowed him to maintain creative input while expanding the brand’s reach across international markets.

The collaboration with 361° represented Dinwiddie’s continued commitment to athlete empowerment and brand ownership, positioning him as both a professional basketball player and an active participant in the business of sports apparel.
