= 2017 NBA All-Star Game =

Exhibition basketball game

	1	2	3	4	Total
East	53	39	47	43	182
West	48	49	47	48	192
- Date: February 19, 2017
- Arena: Smoothie King Center (Note: The event was originally scheduled to be held at the Spectrum Center in Charlotte, North Carolina.)
- City: New Orleans
- MVP: Anthony Davis (West)
- National anthem: Jon Batiste (American); Nikki Yanofsky (Canadian)
- Halftime show: John Legend
- Attendance: 15,701
- Network: TNT, TBS (United States); Sportsnet (Canada)
- Announcers: Marv Albert, Reggie Miller, Chris Webber, David Aldridge, and Kristen Ledlow; Kevin Harlan, Ernie Johnson, Reggie Miller, Kenny Smith, and Shaquille O'Neal (All-Star Saturday Night); Matt Winer, Grant Hill and Chris Webber (Rising Stars Challenge)

NBA All-Star Game
< 2016	2018 >

The 2017 NBA All-Star Game was an exhibition basketball game that was played on February 19, 2017, during the National Basketball Association's (NBA) 2016–17 season. It was the 66th edition of the NBA All-Star Game, and was played at the Smoothie King Center in New Orleans, home of the New Orleans Pelicans. This was the third time that New Orleans hosted the All-Star Game; the previous times were in 2008 and 2014.

The Western Conference defeated the Eastern Conference, 192–182. Anthony Davis was named the All-Star Game Most Valuable Player after scoring 52 points, at the time the second most ever by a player in an NBA All-Star Game. The game was televised nationally by TNT and TBS in the United States.

The NBA initially planned to hold the 2017 All-Star Game at the Spectrum Center in Charlotte, North Carolina, home of the Charlotte Hornets; it would have been the second time that Charlotte hosted the All-Star Game, following the 1991 event at the now-demolished Charlotte Coliseum. On August 19, 2016, the NBA chose to move the 2017 All-Star Game to New Orleans, due to controversy surrounding North Carolina's "bathroom bill", commonly known as HB2. It was the first major sporting event in the United States to be relocated for political reasons since 1990; in that instance, the National Football League (NFL) relocated Super Bowl XXVII out of Tempe, Arizona, because the state did not recognize Martin Luther King Jr. Day.

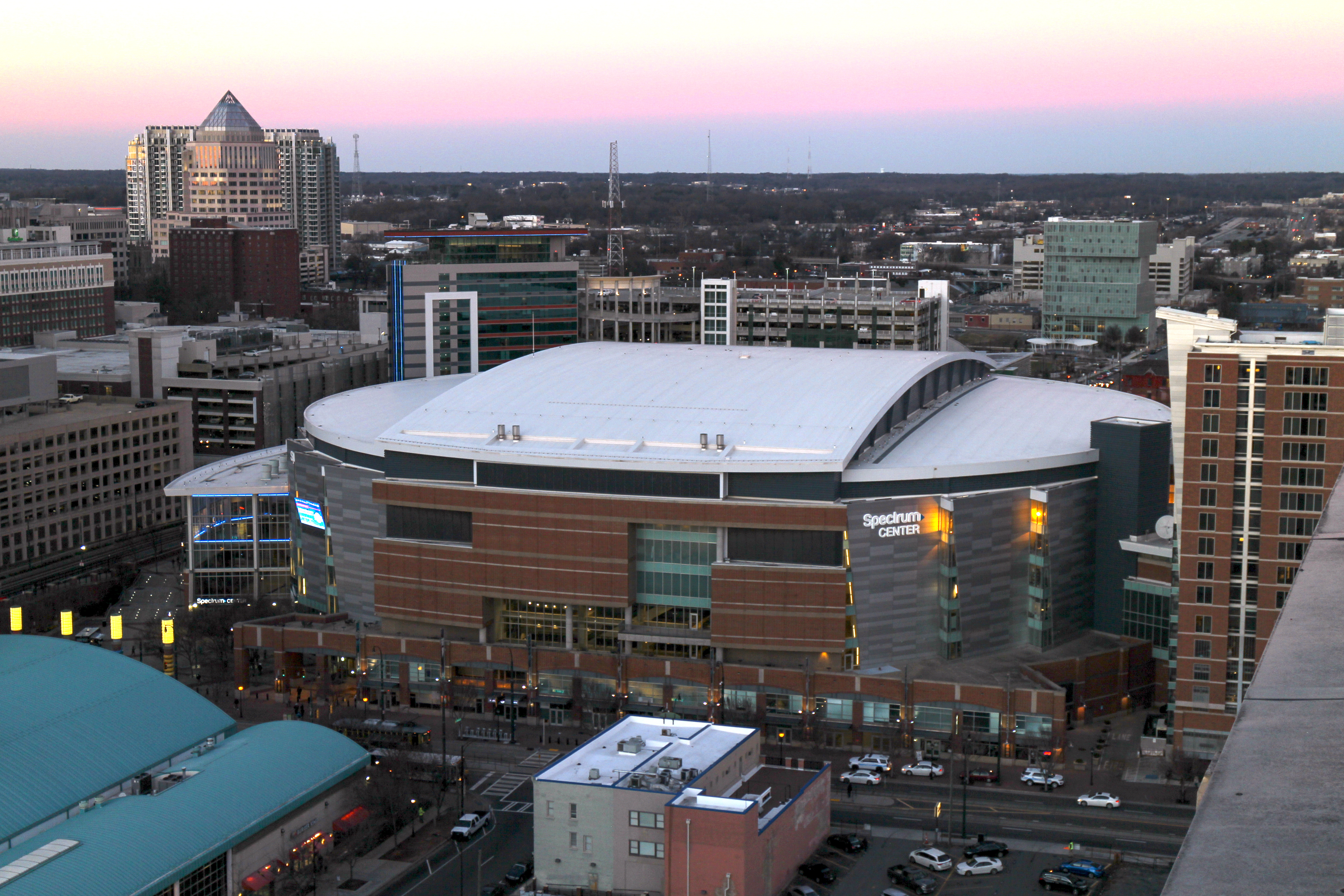
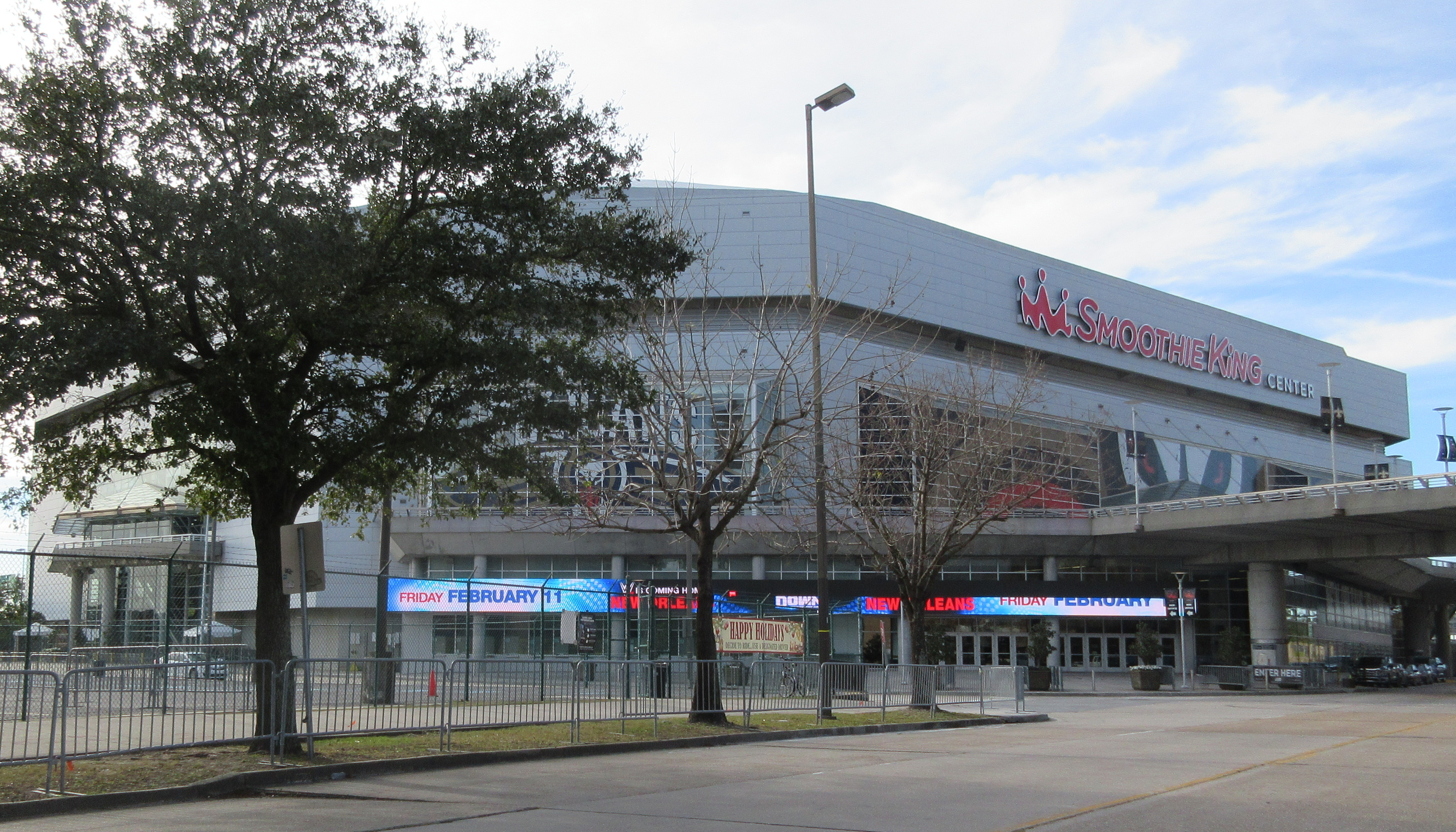
The game was originally scheduled to be held at Spectrum Center in Charlotte, North Carolina, but due to the passing of the Public Facilities Privacy & Security Act, it was moved to the Smoothie King Center in New Orleans, Louisiana.

== Relocation ==
The Public Facilities Privacy & Security Act/HB2 became law in March 2016. It banned, among other things, North Carolinian city governments from passing ordinances that protect members of the LGBT community from discrimination. Charlotte already passed such an ordinance in February 2016. However, when HB2 went into effect, it terminated said ordinance. Consequently, talks about the National Basketball Association pulling its All-Star Game from Charlotte began to rise.

Factors into this relocation threat were that out of all major professional sports leagues, the NBA reportedly has the largest LGBT fanbase. Another was that the NBA fanbase skewed much younger on average, and younger Americans are more supportive of LGBT rights.

In the days after HB2 was signed, Dallas and especially Atlanta both suggested they could host the All-Star Game if the NBA removed it. Atlanta made their public suggestion to the NBA less than a week after HB2 passed, mentioning it had vetoed a similar bill and had success with hosting other major events of a similar size. In response, however, the NBA stuck with Charlotte. On April 5, NBA analyst and former player Charles Barkley voiced his support to move the All-Star Game. He joined other newspaper journalists, including journalists from The Guardian and The Washington Post, who advised the NBA to do the same.

On April 10, a group of six US Senators wrote to NBA Commissioner Adam Silver, telling him to move the game in response to HB2. Detroit Pistons head coach Stan Van Gundy also spoke out in favor of moving the game. Two days later an Oakland city council member announced her intention for Oakland to host, again using HB2 as the primary reason for moving the game.

During the Board of Governors meetings, the NBA announced they did not have plans to remove the game from Charlotte and did not vote to; however, Silver said HB2 remained a problem and, according to an official press release, was also concerned about Charlotte's capability to host because of HB2. Silver next spoke about the issue on April 21 at the Associated Press Sports Editors commissioner meetings and on ESPN's Mike and Mike morning radio show. During both appearances he stated the NBA would rather work with the state and city governments to help change the law than issue a definitive statement. However, he also made clear the game would move if HB2 wasn't changed.

On June 2, Silver met with reporters to discuss the future of the All-Star Game, stating the league was "looking at alternatives"; however, he went on to say, "...it [would not be] productive to draw a line in the sand, and we'd be moving on if I didn't think there were constructive discussions going on in North Carolina right now." Six days later, Barkley again spoke out on the subject, merely repeating his thoughts that the game should be moved. On July 12, the Associated Press reported that several well-known technology companies had written a letter to Silver telling him to move the game, using HB2 as their main reason for doing so. Silver gave an update later that day during a league conference, again saying no vote had been taken on whether to move the game. However, he did say, "...the calendar is not our friend." Silver also said the final decision would be made by summer's end.

On July 21, the NBA pulled the All-Star Game from Charlotte, and New Orleans was the frontrunner to replace it. New Orleans previously hosted the All-Star Game in 2008 and 2014. The same day, the NBA confirmed these rumors to be true with a press release, saying they hope to award Charlotte the game in 2019. On August 19, the NBA selected New Orleans as the new location to host the All-Star Game.

Ticket prices plunged ahead of the All-Star weekend. According to data compiled by resale ticket market research firm TicketIQ, the price of the cheapest ticket available on the resale market two days before the game was down 71% from the previous All-Star Game in Toronto. TicketIQ founder and CEO Jesse Lawrence cited 'All-Star Fatigue' as a possible reason for the decline, given the city's recent hosting of the game.

== All-Star Game ==
=== Coaches ===
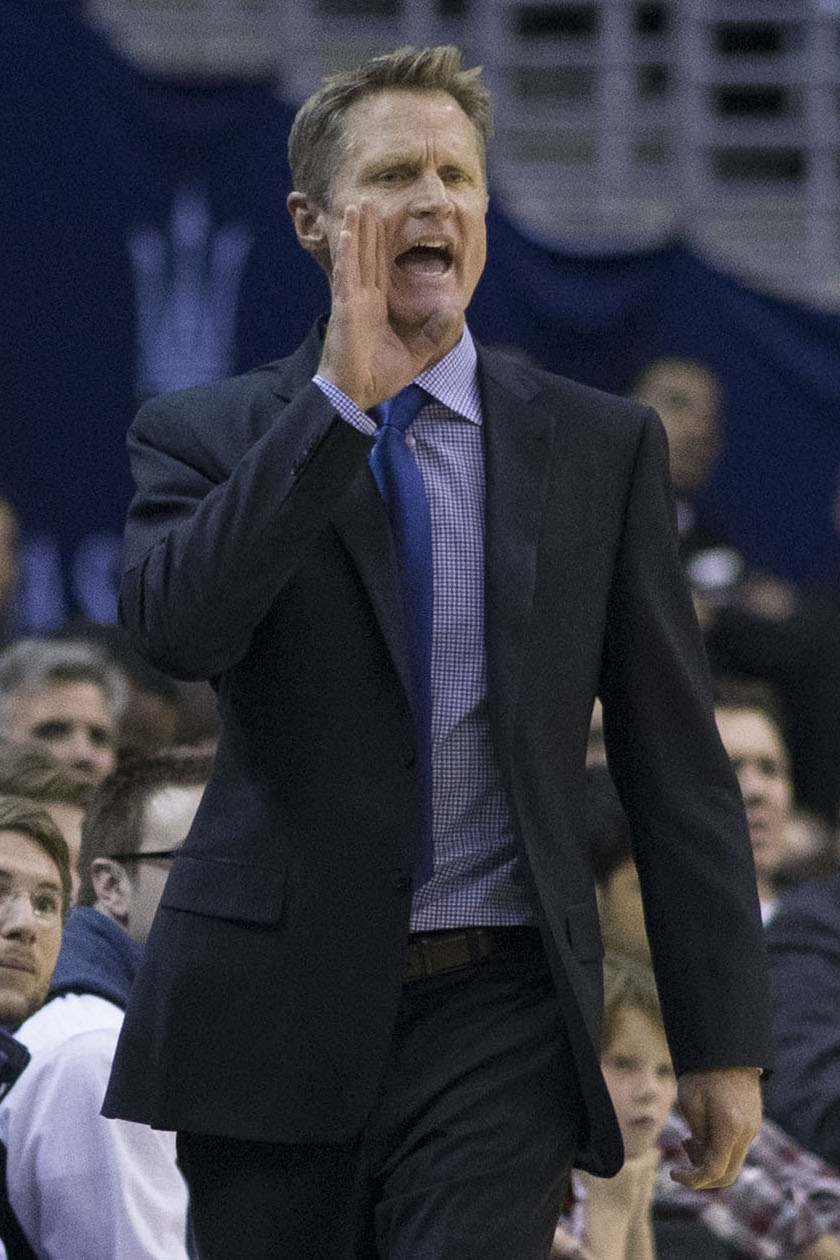
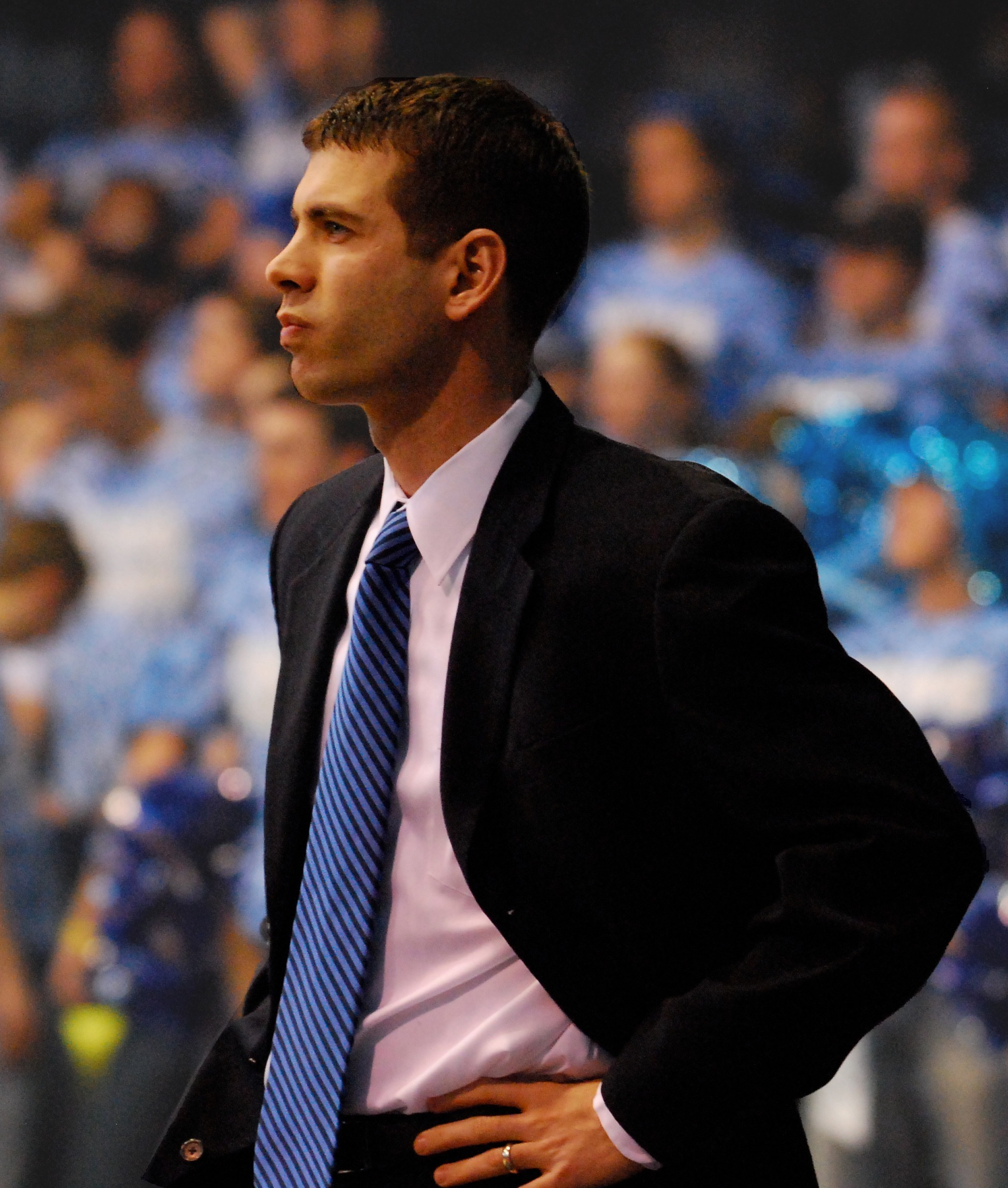
Steve Kerr (left) and Brad Stevens (right) were selected as the West and East head coach, respectively.

The Golden State Warriors had the best record in the Western Conference, therefore making Steve Kerr the Western Conference head coach. Brad Stevens, coach of the Boston Celtics, was the head coach for the Eastern Conference team. While the Cleveland Cavaliers had the best record in the Eastern Conference at the time, the Cavaliers coach, Tyronn Lue, was ineligible to coach in the All-Star Game in 2017, due to the fact he was the coach in 2016. The honor instead went to the coach of the second place team, Boston.

=== Rosters ===
The rosters for the All-Star Game are selected through a voting process. The starters for the first time are chosen by not only the fans, but also by the media and current NBA players. Fans make up 50% of the vote, and NBA players and media each comprise 25% of the vote. The two guards and three frontcourt players who receive the highest cumulative vote totals are named the All-Star starters. NBA head coaches vote for the reserves for their respective conferences, none of which can be players on their own team. Each coach selects two guards, three frontcourt players and two wild cards, with each selected player ranked in order of preference within each category. If a multi-position player is to be selected, coaches are encouraged to vote for the player at the position that was "most advantageous for the All-Star team", regardless of where the player was listed on the All-Star ballot or the position he was listed in box scores.

The All-Star Game starters were announced on January 19, 2017. Kyrie Irving of the Cleveland Cavaliers and DeMar DeRozan of the Toronto Raptors were named the backcourt starters in the East, earning their fourth and third all-star appearances, respectively. LeBron James was named a starter to his 13th career all-star game, tying Dirk Nowitzki for most selections among active players. Joining James in the East frontcourt was Jimmy Butler of the Chicago Bulls, his third consecutive selection, and Giannis Antetokounmpo of the Milwaukee Bucks, his first all-star selection in his young career, and the first Buck to be named an all-star since Michael Redd in 2004. Giannis became the first Greek basketball player to participate in the all-star game.

Stephen Curry of the Golden State Warriors and James Harden of the Houston Rockets were named to the starting backcourt in the West, earning their fourth and fifth all-star appearances, respectively. In the frontcourt, Kevin Durant of the Golden State Warriors was named to his eighth career all-star game, along with Kawhi Leonard of the San Antonio Spurs and Anthony Davis of the New Orleans Pelicans, their second and fourth all-star selections, respectively.

The All-Star Game reserves were announced on January 26, 2017. The West reserves include Russell Westbrook of the Oklahoma City Thunder, Klay Thompson and Draymond Green of the Golden State Warriors, DeMarcus Cousins of the Sacramento Kings, Marc Gasol of the Memphis Grizzlies, DeAndre Jordan of the Los Angeles Clippers, and Gordon Hayward of the Utah Jazz. Jordan and Hayward were selected as all-stars for the first time in their respective careers.

The East reserves include Kyle Lowry of the Toronto Raptors, Isaiah Thomas of the Boston Celtics, John Wall of the Washington Wizards, Paul George of the Indiana Pacers, Kevin Love of the Cleveland Cavaliers, Paul Millsap of the Atlanta Hawks, and Kemba Walker of the Charlotte Hornets, who was selected as an all-star for the first time in his career. Carmelo Anthony of the New York Knicks was named as a replacement for Kevin Love due to Love suffering a knee injury.

Eastern Conference All-Stars
Pos	Player	Team	No. of selections
Starters
G	Kyrie Irving	Cleveland Cavaliers	4
G	DeMar DeRozan	Toronto Raptors	3
F	LeBron James	Cleveland Cavaliers	13
F	Jimmy Butler	Chicago Bulls	3
F/G	Giannis Antetokounmpo	Milwaukee Bucks	1
Reserves
G	Isaiah Thomas	Boston Celtics	2
G	John Wall	Washington Wizards	4
F/C	Kevin Love^{INJ}	Cleveland Cavaliers	4
F	Carmelo Anthony^{REP}	New York Knicks	10
G	Kyle Lowry	Toronto Raptors	3
F	Paul George	Indiana Pacers	4
G	Kemba Walker	Charlotte Hornets	1
F	Paul Millsap	Atlanta Hawks	4
Head coach: Brad Stevens (Boston Celtics)

Western Conference All-Stars
Pos	Player	Team	No. of selections
Starters
G	Stephen Curry	Golden State Warriors	4
G	James Harden	Houston Rockets	5
F	Kevin Durant	Golden State Warriors	8
F	Kawhi Leonard	San Antonio Spurs	2
F/C	Anthony Davis	New Orleans Pelicans	4
Reserves
G	Russell Westbrook	Oklahoma City Thunder	6
G	Klay Thompson	Golden State Warriors	3
F	Draymond Green	Golden State Warriors	2
C	DeMarcus Cousins	Sacramento Kings	3
C	Marc Gasol	Memphis Grizzlies	3
C	DeAndre Jordan	Los Angeles Clippers	1
F	Gordon Hayward	Utah Jazz	1
Head coach: Steve Kerr (Golden State Warriors)

^INJ Kevin Love was unable to participate due to a knee injury.
^REP Carmelo Anthony was selected as Kevin Love's replacement.

=== Game ===
TNT, TBS

February 19, 2017
8:30 pm ET

Report

Eastern Conference 182, Western Conference 192
Scoring by quarter: 53–48, 39–49, 47–47, 43–48
Pts: Giannis Antetokounmpo 30; Rebs: Kyrie Irving 7 Asts: Kyrie Irving 14	Pts: Anthony Davis 52; Rebs: Davis, Durant, Gasol 10; Asts: James Harden 12

Smoothie King Center, New Orleans, Louisiana
Attendance: 15,701
Referees:
- Ken Mauer
- Ed Malloy
- Tom Washington

== All-Star Weekend ==
=== Celebrity Game ===
The 2017 NBA All-Star Celebrity Game was played on Friday, February 17, 2017, at the Mercedes-Benz Superdome.

The game was a matchup of Team East vs. Team West, coached by ESPN SportsCenter hosts Michael Smith and Jemele Hill, respectively. The game featured 23 players, including actors Ansel Elgort, Caleb McLaughlin, & Romeo Miller, and TV host Nick Cannon. The game also includes two NBA legends, Jason Williams, and Baron Davis, as well as Lindsay Whalen and Candace Parker of the WNBA.

The game ended up being the second most lopsided game in Celebrity Game history to date. The East Team's 88 points were the most ever scored by one team, and their 29-point margin of victory was the second largest ever. Even though last year's MVP and the East Team player Win Butler scored 22 points and 11 rebounds, his teammate Brandon Armstrong won the 2017 All-Star Celebrity Game MVP award with 16 points and 15 rebounds.

ESPN

February 17, 2017
7:00 pm ET

Team East 88, Team West 59
Scoring by quarter: 20–12, 19–11, 20–19, 29–17

Mercedes-Benz Superdome, New Orleans, Louisiana

Team East
Player	Background
Brandon Armstrong	Social media star, former NBA D-League player
Win Butler (3)	Musician
Nick Cannon (9)	TV personality, actor, rapper
Rachel DeMita	NBA2K TV personality
Ansel Elgort (2)	Actor
Marc Lasry (2)	Milwaukee Bucks owner
Caleb McLaughlin	Actor
Peter Rosenberg	Media personality
Oscar Schmidt	Olympic Basketball legend
Lindsay Whalen	WNBA player
Jason Williams	Former NBA player
Kris Wu (2)	Actor, rapper
Head coach: Jemele Hill (ESPN host)
Assistant coach: Kyle Lowry (NBA player, Toronto Raptors)
Assistant coach: Fat Joe (rapper)
Assistant coach: DJ Khaled (rapper)

Team West
Player	Background
Mark Cuban (2)	Dallas Mavericks owner
Baron Davis	Former NBA player
Andy Grammer	Musician
Jiang Jinfu	Actor, model
Anthony Mackie	Actor
Romeo Miller (3)	Actor
Hasan Minhaj	Actor, comedian
Nneka Ogwumike	WNBA player
Master P (2)	Actor, rapper
Candace Parker	WNBA player
Aarón Sánchez	Celebrity chef
Head coach: Michael Smith (ESPN host)
Assistant coach: Draymond Green (NBA player, Golden State Warriors)
Assistant coach: Rocsi Diaz (TV personality)

=== Rising Stars Challenge ===
Team World
Pos.	Nat.	Player	Team	R/S
C	(Cameroon)	Joel Embiid^{INJ1}	Philadelphia 76ers	Rookie
G	(Australia)	Danté Exum	Utah Jazz	Sophomore
G	(The Bahamas)	Buddy Hield	New Orleans Pelicans	Rookie
C/F	(Serbia)	Nikola Jokić	Denver Nuggets	Sophomore
F	(Canada)	Trey Lyles	Utah Jazz	Sophomore
G	(Democratic Republic of the Congo)	Emmanuel Mudiay^{INJ2}	Denver Nuggets	Sophomore
G	(Canada)	Jamal Murray	Denver Nuggets	Rookie
F/C	(Latvia)	Kristaps Porziņģis	New York Knicks	Sophomore
F	(Lithuania)	Domantas Sabonis	Oklahoma City Thunder	Rookie
F	(Croatia)	Dario Šarić	Philadelphia 76ers	Rookie
G	(Spain)	Álex Abrines^{REP1}	Oklahoma City Thunder	Rookie
C	(Spain)	Willy Hernangómez^{REP2}	New York Knicks	Rookie
Head coach: Mike Brown (Golden State Warriors)

Team USA
Pos.	Player	Team	R/S
G	Devin Booker	Phoenix Suns	Sophomore
G	Malcolm Brogdon	Milwaukee Bucks	Rookie
F	Marquese Chriss	Phoenix Suns	Rookie
F	Brandon Ingram	Los Angeles Lakers	Rookie
C	Frank Kaminsky	Charlotte Hornets	Sophomore
C	Jahlil Okafor	Philadelphia 76ers	Sophomore
G	D'Angelo Russell	Los Angeles Lakers	Sophomore
G	Jonathon Simmons	San Antonio Spurs	Sophomore
C	Karl-Anthony Towns	Minnesota Timberwolves	Sophomore
C/F	Myles Turner	Indiana Pacers	Sophomore
Head coach: Jay Larrañaga (Boston Celtics)

^INJ1 Embiid was unable to participate due to a knee injury.
^REP1 Abrines was named as Embiid's replacement.
^INJ2 Mudiay was unable to participate due to a back injury.
^REP2 Hernangómez was named as Mudiay's replacement.

TNT

February 17
9:00 pm ET

Boxscore

Team World 150, Team USA 141
Scoring by half: 77–66, 73–75
Pts: Jamal Murray (36); Rebs: Nikola Jokić (11); Asts: Jamal Murray (11)	Pts: Frank Kaminsky (33); Rebs: Karl-Anthony Towns (11); Asts: Devin Booker (6)

Smoothie King Center, New Orleans

=== Skills Challenge ===
Contestants
Pos.	Player	Team	Height	Weight
C	Joel Embiid^{INJ}	Philadelphia 76ers	7–0	250
F/C	Anthony Davis	New Orleans Pelicans	6–11	253
F/C	Kristaps Porziņģis	New York Knicks	7–3	240
C	DeMarcus Cousins	Sacramento Kings	6–11	270
C	Nikola Jokić^{REP}	Denver Nuggets	6–10	250
F	Gordon Hayward	Utah Jazz	6–8	226
G	Devin Booker	Phoenix Suns	6–6	206
G	John Wall	Washington Wizards	6–4	210
G	Isaiah Thomas	Boston Celtics	5–9	175

^INJ Embiid was unable to participate due to a knee injury.
^REP Jokić was named as Embiid's replacement.

Quarterfinals
John Wall (Washington)	X
Gordon Hayward (Utah)	O
Isaiah Thomas (Boston)	O
Devin Booker (Phoenix)	X
DeMarcus Cousins (Sacramento)	X
Kristaps Porziņģis (New York)	O
Anthony Davis (New Orleans)	X
Nikola Jokić (Denver)	O

Semifinals
Gordon Hayward (Utah)	O
Isaiah Thomas (Boston)	X
Kristaps Porziņģis (New York)	O
Nikola Jokić (Denver)	X

Finals
Gordon Hayward (Utah)	X
Kristaps Porziņģis (New York)	O

=== Three-Point Contest ===
Contestants
Pos.	Player	Team	Height	Weight	First round	Final round
G	Eric Gordon	Houston Rockets	6–4	215	24	20 (21)
G	Kyrie Irving	Cleveland Cavaliers	6–3	193	20	20 (18)
G	Kemba Walker	Charlotte Hornets	6–1	184	19	17
G/F	Nick Young	Los Angeles Lakers	6–7	210	18	—
G	Klay Thompson	Golden State Warriors	6–7	215	18	—
G	Wesley Matthews	Dallas Mavericks	6–5	220	11	—
G	CJ McCollum	Portland Trail Blazers	6–3	190	10	—
G	Kyle Lowry	Toronto Raptors	6–0	205	9	—

=== Slam Dunk Contest ===
Contestants
Pos.	Player	Team	Height	Weight	First round	Final round
G	Glenn Robinson III	Indiana Pacers	6-6	222	91 (50+41)	94 (44+50)
F	Derrick Jones Jr.	Phoenix Suns	6-7	190	95 (45+50)	87 (37+50)
C	DeAndre Jordan	Los Angeles Clippers	6-11	265	84 (41+43)	—
F	Aaron Gordon	Orlando Magic	6-9	220	72 (38+34)	—
