= 2018 NBA All-Star Game =

Exhibition basketball game

2018 NBA All Star Game
	1	2	3	4	Total
Team LeBron	31	45	33	39	148
Team Stephen	42	36	34	33	145
- Date: February 18, 2018
- Arena: Staples Center
- City: Los Angeles
- MVP: LeBron James (Team LeBron)
- National anthem: Fergie (American); Barenaked Ladies (Canadian)
- Halftime show: Pharrell Williams, Migos, N.E.R.D
- Network: TNT, TBS
- Announcers: Marv Albert, Reggie Miller, Chris Webber, David Aldridge, and Kristen Ledlow; Brent Barry, Reggie Miller, Chris Webber, Kenny Smith, Zach LaVine, and Dennis Scott (All-Star Saturday Night - Players Only); Kevin Harlan, Grant Hill and Chris Webber (Rising Stars Challenge)

NBA All-Star Game
< 2017	2019 >

The 2018 NBA All-Star Game was an exhibition basketball game that was played on February 18, 2018, during the National Basketball Association's (NBA) 2017–18 season. It was the 67th edition of the NBA All-Star Game, and was played at Staples Center in Los Angeles, home of the Los Angeles Lakers and Los Angeles Clippers. Team LeBron defeated Team Stephen, 148–145. LeBron James, namesake of Team LeBron, was named the All-Star Game Most Valuable Player for recording 29 points, 10 rebounds, and 8 assists; it was his third time winning the award since the 2008 All-Star Game. This was the sixth time that Los Angeles had hosted the NBA All-Star Game and the first time since 2011. The game was televised nationally by TNT for the 16th consecutive year, and simulcast on TBS for the 4th straight year.

== Format change ==
On October 3, 2017, the NBA announced that the All-Star Game format would change from the traditional Eastern Conference versus Western Conference format, and would instead switch to a draft-style format, similar to the format used by the NHL All-Star Game from 2011 through 2015 and the NFL Pro Bowl from 2014 through 2016. The team captains were determined by the most votes received in their respective conference. Each team will pick a charity to play for, and the winning team will have money donated to their charity. The winning team will receive US$100,000 for each player and the losing team US$25,000 each.

== All-Star Game ==
=== Coaches ===
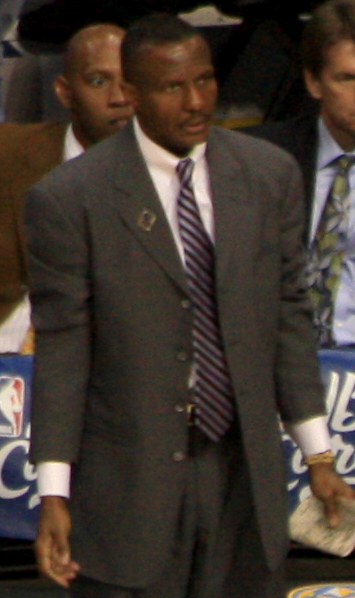
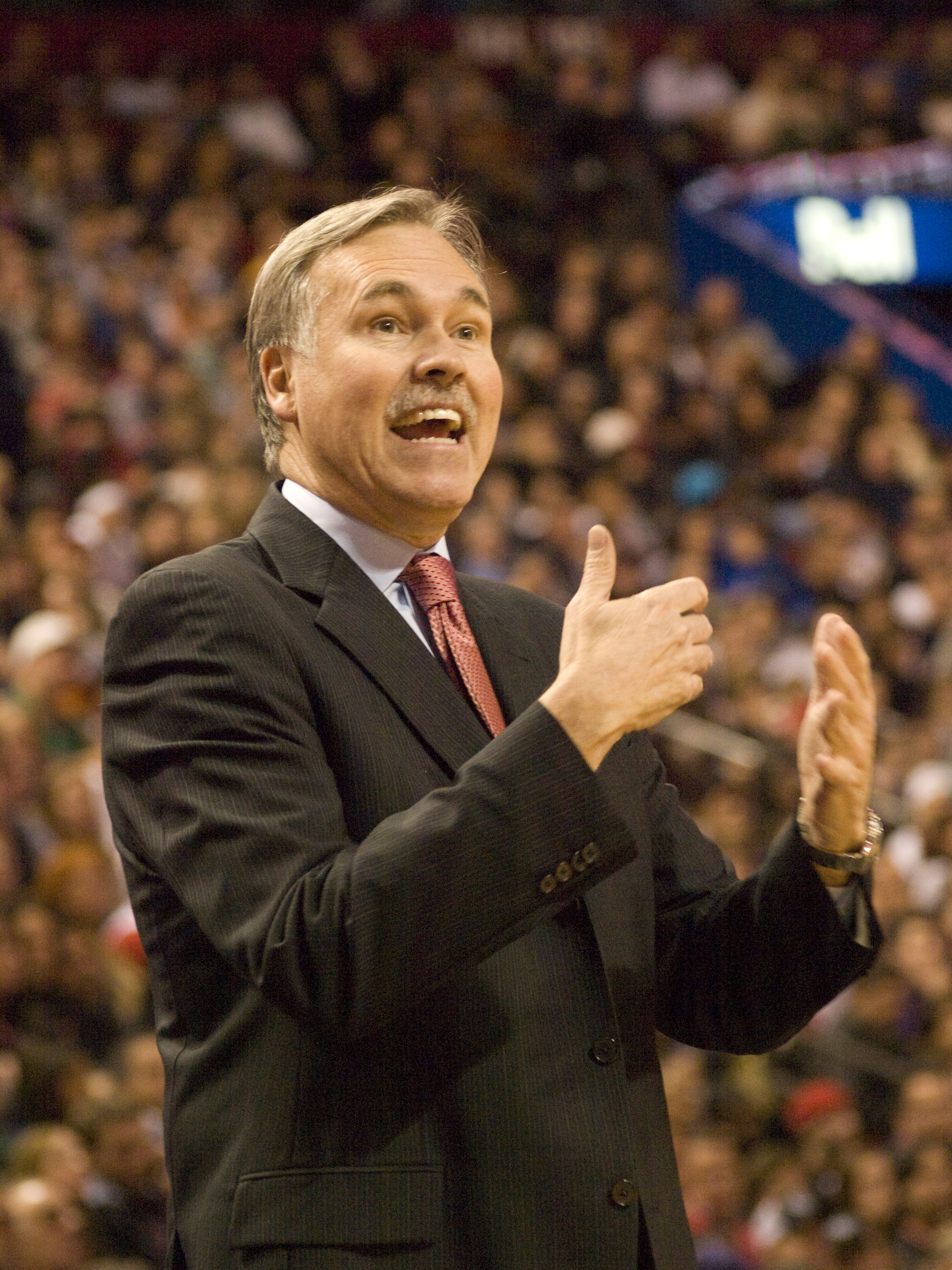
Dwane Casey (left) and Mike D'Antoni (right) were selected as head coach for Team LeBron and Team Stephen, respectively.

The two teams were coached from their team captain's respective conference. Although the Golden State Warriors and Boston Celtics held the best records in the Western and Eastern Conferences, respectively, their head coaches, Steve Kerr and Brad Stevens, were ineligible to coach in the All-Star Game because league rules prohibit a coach from participating in consecutive All-Star Games, as both had coached in the 2017 game. Thus, the honor went to the head coach of the team with the second-best record in each conference instead. Mike D'Antoni, head coach of the Houston Rockets, was named as the head coach for Team Stephen. Dwane Casey, head coach of the Toronto Raptors, was named as the head coach for Team LeBron.

=== Rosters ===
The rosters for the All-Star Game were selected through a voting process. The starters were chosen by the fans, media, and current NBA players. Fans make up 50% of the vote, and NBA players and media each comprise 25% of the vote. The two guards and three frontcourt players who receive the highest cumulative vote totals are named the All-Star starters. NBA head coaches vote for the reserves for their respective conferences, none of which can be players on their own team. Each coach selects two guards, three frontcourt players and two wild cards, with each selected player ranked in order of preference within each category. If a multi-position player is to be selected, coaches are encouraged to vote for the player at the position that was "most advantageous for the All-Star team", regardless of where the player was listed on the All-Star ballot or the position he was listed in box scores.

The All-Star Game starters were announced on January 18, 2018. Kyrie Irving of the Boston Celtics and DeMar DeRozan of the Toronto Raptors were named the backcourt starters in the East, earning their fifth and fourth all-star appearances, respectively. LeBron James was named a starter to his 14th career all-star game, breaking Dirk Nowitzki's record for most selections among active players. Joining James in the East frontcourt was Joel Embiid of the Philadelphia 76ers, his first selection, and Giannis Antetokounmpo of the Milwaukee Bucks, his second selection.

Stephen Curry of the Golden State Warriors and James Harden of the Houston Rockets were named to the starting backcourt in the West, earning their fifth and sixth all-star appearances, respectively. In the frontcourt, Kevin Durant of the Golden State Warriors was named to his ninth career all-star game, along with DeMarcus Cousins and Anthony Davis of the New Orleans Pelicans, their fourth and fifth all-star selections, respectively. During the All-Star Game, Davis would wear his teammate Cousins' jersey as a means of honoring him after his season-ending injury occurred before the All-Star Game began.

The All-Star Game reserves were announced on January 23, 2018. The West reserves include Russell Westbrook of the Oklahoma City Thunder, his seventh selection, Klay Thompson and Draymond Green of the Golden State Warriors, their fourth and third all-star selections, respectively, LaMarcus Aldridge of the San Antonio Spurs, his sixth selection, Damian Lillard of the Portland Trail Blazers, his third selection, and Karl-Anthony Towns and Jimmy Butler of the Minnesota Timberwolves, their first and fourth all-star selections, respectively. Westbrook would later be named the replacement starter for DeMarcus Cousins' open starting spot on the team.

The East reserves include Kyle Lowry of the Toronto Raptors, his fourth selection, Al Horford of the Boston Celtics, his fifth selection, John Wall and Bradley Beal of the Washington Wizards, their fifth and first all-star selections, respectively, Victor Oladipo of the Indiana Pacers, his first selection, Kevin Love of the Cleveland Cavaliers, his fifth selection, and Kristaps Porzingis of the New York Knicks, his first selection.

Eastern Conference All-Stars
Pos	Player	Team	No. of selections
Starters
G	Kyrie Irving	Boston Celtics	5
G	DeMar DeRozan	Toronto Raptors	4
F	LeBron James	Cleveland Cavaliers	14
F	Giannis Antetokounmpo	Milwaukee Bucks	2
C	Joel Embiid	Philadelphia 76ers	1
Reserves
G	Bradley Beal	Washington Wizards	1
G	Goran Dragić^{REP3}	Miami Heat	1
C/F	Al Horford	Boston Celtics	5
F/C	Kevin Love^{INJ3}	Cleveland Cavaliers	5
G	Kyle Lowry	Toronto Raptors	4
G	Victor Oladipo	Indiana Pacers	1
F/C	Kristaps Porziņģis^{INJ4}	New York Knicks	1
G	John Wall^{INJ2}	Washington Wizards	5
C	Andre Drummond^{REP2}	Detroit Pistons	2
G	Kemba Walker^{REP4}	Charlotte Hornets	2

Western Conference All-Stars
Pos	Player	Team	No. of selections
Starters
G	Stephen Curry	Golden State Warriors	5
G	James Harden	Houston Rockets	6
F	Kevin Durant	Golden State Warriors	9
F/C	Anthony Davis	New Orleans Pelicans	5
C	DeMarcus Cousins^{INJ1}	New Orleans Pelicans	4
Reserves
G	Russell Westbrook	Oklahoma City Thunder	7
G	Damian Lillard	Portland Trail Blazers	3
F	Draymond Green	Golden State Warriors	3
C	Karl-Anthony Towns	Minnesota Timberwolves	1
F/C	LaMarcus Aldridge	San Antonio Spurs	6
G	Klay Thompson	Golden State Warriors	4
G/F	Jimmy Butler	Minnesota Timberwolves	4
F	Paul George^{REP1}	Oklahoma City Thunder	5

=== Draft ===
LeBron James and Stephen Curry were named as captains due to being the leading vote getter from the East and West, respectively. James had the first pick in the draft as the leading vote getter overall, while Curry has first choice of jersey color, due to the Western Conference having home team status for the game. The draft pool consisted of the eight other starters, with no regard to conference designation, and 14 reserves (seven from each conference), chosen by NBA head coaches. On January 25, 2018, LeBron James and Stephen Curry created their rosters via a draft, which would not be televised for various reasons. NBA Commissioner Adam Silver will select the replacement for any player unable to participate in the All-Star Game, choosing a player from the same conference as the player who is being replaced. Silver's selection would join the team that drafted the replaced player. If a replaced player is a starter, the head coach of that team will choose a new starter from his cast of players instead.

Team LeBron
Pos	Player	Team
Starters
F	Kevin Durant	Golden State Warriors
F/C	Anthony Davis	New Orleans Pelicans
F	LeBron James	Cleveland Cavaliers
C	DeMarcus Cousins^{INJ1}	New Orleans Pelicans
G	Kyrie Irving	Boston Celtics
Reserves
F/C	LaMarcus Aldridge	San Antonio Spurs
G	Bradley Beal	Washington Wizards
F/C	Kevin Love^{INJ3}	Cleveland Cavaliers
G	Russell Westbrook^{ST}	Oklahoma City Thunder
G	Victor Oladipo	Indiana Pacers
F/C	Kristaps Porziņģis^{INJ4}	New York Knicks
G	John Wall^{INJ2}	Washington Wizards
F	Paul George^{REP1}	Oklahoma City Thunder
C	Andre Drummond^{REP2}	Detroit Pistons
G	Goran Dragić^{REP3}	Miami Heat
G	Kemba Walker^{REP4}	Charlotte Hornets
Head coach: Dwane Casey (Toronto Raptors)

Team Stephen
Pos	Player	Team
Starters
G	James Harden	Houston Rockets
G	DeMar DeRozan	Toronto Raptors
G	Stephen Curry	Golden State Warriors
G/F	Giannis Antetokounmpo	Milwaukee Bucks
C	Joel Embiid	Philadelphia 76ers
Reserves
G	Damian Lillard	Portland Trail Blazers
G/F	Jimmy Butler	Minnesota Timberwolves
F	Draymond Green	Golden State Warriors
G	Kyle Lowry	Toronto Raptors
G	Klay Thompson	Golden State Warriors
C	Karl-Anthony Towns	Minnesota Timberwolves
F/C	Al Horford	Boston Celtics
Head coach: Mike D'Antoni (Houston Rockets)

^INJ1 DeMarcus Cousins was unable to play due to a season-ending Achilles injury.
^REP1 Paul George was selected as DeMarcus Cousins' replacement.
^INJ2 John Wall was unable to participate due to a knee injury.
^REP2 Andre Drummond was selected as John Wall's replacement.
^INJ3 Kevin Love was unable to participate due to a hand injury.
^REP3 Goran Dragić was selected as Kevin Love's replacement.
^INJ4 Kristaps Porziņģis was unable to participate due to a season-ending torn ACL.
^REP4 Kemba Walker was named as Kristaps Porziņģis' replacement.
^STRussell Westbrook was selected to start in place of Cousins.

=== Game ===
TNT, TBS

February 18, 2018
8:30 pm ET

Recap

Team LeBron 148, Team Stephen 145
Scoring by quarter: 31–42, 45–36, 33–34, 39–33
Pts: LeBron James 29; Rebs: LeBron James 10; Asts: Kyrie Irving 9	Pts: DeRozan, Lillard 21 each Rebs: Karl-Anthony Towns 10; Asts: Kyle Lowry 11

Staples Center, Los Angeles, California
Attendance: 17,801
Referees:
- #19 James Capers
- #6 Tony Brown
- #59 Gary Zielinski

=== National anthem ===
Fergie's performance of "The Star-Spangled Banner" prior to the game received heavy negative criticism and mockery online. The rendition—described as "unusual" and "bizarre"—was met with laughter from the arena crowd, and All-Stars Draymond Green and Stephen Curry were shown chuckling on the television broadcast. The following day, Fergie said she "wanted to try something special for the NBA," but it "didn't strike the intended tone."

== All-Star Weekend ==
=== Celebrity Game ===
The 2018 NBA All-Star Celebrity Game was played on Friday, February 16, 2018, at the Los Angeles Convention Center. In honor of Los Angeles as host city, the two teams were named after its two NBA teams, with Rachel Nichols coaching Team Lakers and Katie Nolan coaching Team Clippers.

ESPN

February 16, 2018
7:00 pm ET

Team Lakers 66, Team Clippers 75
Scoring by quarter: 13–19, 17–18, 19–17, 17–21

Los Angeles Convention Center, Los Angeles, California

Team Lakers
Player	Background
Justin Bieber (2)	Singer
Steelo Brim	TV personality, host, actor
Nick Cannon (10)	TV personality, actor, rapper
Terence Crawford	Boxer
Rachel DeMita (2)	NBA 2KTV personality
Jerry Ferrara	Actor
Flea	Musician
Michael B. Jordan (2)	Actor
Marc Lasry (3)	Milwaukee Bucks owner
Tracy McGrady (2)	Former NBA player
Caleb McLaughlin (2)	Actor
Candace Parker (2)	WNBA player
Nate Robinson	Former NBA player
Drew Scott (3)	Actor
Kris Wu (3)	Actor, rapper
Head coach: Rachel Nichols (ESPN host)
Assistant coach: Tracy McGrady (former NBA player, ESPN analyst)
Assistant coach: Michael B. Jordan (actor)

Team Clippers
Player	Background
Anthony Anderson (4)	Actor
Brandon Armstrong (2)	Social media star, former NBA D-League player
Miles Brown	Actor
Win Butler (4)	Musician
Common (7)	Rapper, actor
Andre De Grasse	Olympic sprinter
Stefanie Dolson	WNBA player
Jamie Foxx (3)	Actor, comedian, singer
Paul Pierce	Former NBA player
Dascha Polanco	Actress
Quavo	Rapper, recording artist
Offset	Rapper
Bubba Watson	Golfer
Jason Williams (2)	Former NBA player
Head coach: Katie Nolan (ESPN host)
Assistant coach: Paul Pierce (former NBA player)
Assistant coach: Common (rapper, actor)

=== Mountain Dew KickStart Rising Stars Challenge ===
Team World
Pos.	Nat.	Player	Team	R/S
G	(Serbia)	Bogdan Bogdanović	Sacramento Kings	Rookie
G/F	(Canada)	Dillon Brooks	Memphis Grizzlies	Rookie
C	(Cameroon)	Joel Embiid	Philadelphia 76ers	Sophomore
G	(The Bahamas)	Buddy Hield	Sacramento Kings	Sophomore
F	(Finland)	Lauri Markkanen	Chicago Bulls	Rookie
G	(Canada)	Jamal Murray	Denver Nuggets	Sophomore
G	(France)	Frank Ntilikina	New York Knicks	Rookie
F/C	(Lithuania)	Domantas Sabonis	Indiana Pacers	Sophomore
F	(Croatia)	Dario Šarić	Philadelphia 76ers	Sophomore
G/F	(Australia)	Ben Simmons	Philadelphia 76ers	Rookie
Head coach: (Armenia) Rex Kalamian (Toronto Raptors)

Team USA
Pos.	Player	Team	R/S
G	Lonzo Ball^{INJ2}	Los Angeles Lakers	Rookie
G	Malcolm Brogdon^{INJ1}	Milwaukee Bucks	Sophomore
G/F	Jaylen Brown	Boston Celtics	Sophomore
F/C	John Collins	Atlanta Hawks	Rookie
G	Kris Dunn	Chicago Bulls	Sophomore
G/F	Brandon Ingram	Los Angeles Lakers	Sophomore
F	Kyle Kuzma	Los Angeles Lakers	Rookie
G	Donovan Mitchell	Utah Jazz	Rookie
G	Dennis Smith Jr.	Dallas Mavericks	Rookie
F	Jayson Tatum	Boston Celtics	Rookie
F	Taurean Prince^{REP1}	Atlanta Hawks	Sophomore
G	De'Aaron Fox^{REP2}	Sacramento Kings	Rookie
Head coach: Roy Rogers (Houston Rockets)

^INJ1 Malcolm Brogdon was unable to participate due to a leg injury.
^REP1 Taurean Prince was selected as Malcolm Brogdon's replacement.
^INJ2 Lonzo Ball was unable to participate due to a knee injury.
^REP2 De'Aaron Fox was selected as Lonzo Ball's replacement.

TNT

February 16
9:00 pm ET

Boxscore

Team World 155, Team USA 124
Scoring by half: 78–59, 77–65
Pts: Buddy Hield 29; Rebs: Domantas Sabonis 11; Asts: Ben Simmons 13	Pts: Jaylen Brown 35; Rebs: Jaylen Brown 10; Asts: Donovan Mitchell 7

Staples Center, Los Angeles
Attendance: 19,060
Referees:
- #21 Dedric Taylor
- #7 Lauren Holtkamp
- #39 Tyler Ford

=== Skills Challenge ===
Contestants
Pos.	Player	Team	Height	Weight
G	Spencer Dinwiddie	Brooklyn Nets	6–6	200
C	Joel Embiid	Philadelphia 76ers	7–0	250
F/C	Al Horford	Boston Celtics	6–10	245
F	Lauri Markkanen	Chicago Bulls	7–0	230
G	Donovan Mitchell^{OUT}	Utah Jazz	6–3	215
G	Jamal Murray	Denver Nuggets	6–4	207
F/C	Kristaps Porziņģis^{INJ}	New York Knicks	7–3	240
G	Lou Williams	Los Angeles Clippers	6–1	175
G	Buddy Hield^{ALT}	Sacramento Kings	6–4	214
C	Andre Drummond^{REP}	Detroit Pistons	6–11	279

^OUT Donovan Mitchell was removed due to replacing Aaron Gordon in the Slam Dunk Contest.
^ALT Buddy Hield was named as Donovan Mitchell's replacement.
^INJ Kristaps Porziņģis unable to participate due to a torn ACL.
^REP Andre Drummond was named as Kristaps Porziņģis' replacement.

Quarterfinals
Spencer Dinwiddie (Brooklyn)	O
Buddy Hield (Sacramento)	X
Jamal Murray (Denver)	O
Lou Williams (LA Clippers)	X
Al Horford (Boston)	X
Joel Embiid (Philadelphia)	O
Lauri Markkanen (Chicago)	O
Andre Drummond (Detroit)	X

Semifinals
Spencer Dinwiddie (Brooklyn)	O
Jamal Murray (Denver)	X
Joel Embiid (Philadelphia)	X
Lauri Markkanen (Chicago)	O

Finals
Spencer Dinwiddie (Brooklyn)	O
Lauri Markkanen (Chicago)	X

=== Three-Point Contest ===
Contestants
Pos.	Player	Team	Height	Weight	First round	Final round
G	Devin Booker	Phoenix Suns	6–6	210	19	28
G	Klay Thompson	Golden State Warriors	6–7	215	19	25
F	Tobias Harris	Los Angeles Clippers	6–9	235	18	17
G	Wayne Ellington	Miami Heat	6–5	200	17	—
G	Bradley Beal	Washington Wizards	6–5	207	15	—
G	Eric Gordon	Houston Rockets	6–4	215	12	—
G	Kyle Lowry	Toronto Raptors	6–0	205	11	—
F	Paul George	Oklahoma City Thunder	6–9	220	9	—

=== Slam Dunk Contest ===
Contestants
Pos.	Player	Team	Height	Weight	First round	Final round
G	Donovan Mitchell^{REP}	Utah Jazz	6–3	215	98 (48+50)	98 (50+48)
F	Larry Nance Jr.	Cleveland Cavaliers	6–9	230	93 (44+49)	96 (46+50)
G	Dennis Smith Jr.	Dallas Mavericks	6–3	195	89 (39+50)	—
G	Victor Oladipo	Indiana Pacers	6–4	210	71 (31+40)	—
G	Aaron Gordon^{INJ}	Orlando Magic	6–9	220	—	—

^INJ Aaron Gordon was unable to participate due to a hip injury.
^REP Donovan Mitchell was named as Aaron Gordon's replacement.
