= List of NBA All-Star Game head coaches =

This is a list of NBA All-Star Game head coaches. The National Basketball Association All-Star Game is an annual basketball exhibition game held during the National Basketball Association (NBA) regular season. For most of its history, the All-Star Game was played between the Western Conference All-Stars and the Eastern Conference All-Stars, where the head coach for each All-Star team was the coach of the NBA team with the best record from their respective conference. From the 2018 to the 2023 game, the format of the game was slightly altered. The starters and reserves were chosen as usual, but the two captains (one from each conference) draft their team from those starters and reserves. The coaches are also selected as usual, and matched with the captain from their respective conference. For the 2025 game, the format was changed to a tournament style, pitting four teams of eight players each. Three teams would be represented by the NBA All-Stars, while a fourth team would be represented by the winning team of the Rising Stars Challenge composed of NBA rookies and sophomores plus NBA G League standouts. The coaches selected remain the same as previous All-Star Games, randomly assigned to one of the three All-Star teams. The remaining All-Star team and the Rising Stars team would be coached by the assistant coach from one of the head coach's NBA teams. The 2026 game retained the tournament format, but would feature two teams composed of U.S.-born All-Stars and one team composed of international All-Stars. In a unique twist, three head coaches were selected for the tournament, with the international team being coached by a foreign-born head coach.

To ensure that a different coach represents their conference each year, there is a rule against a head coach making a consecutive appearance. Instead, the coach with the next best record is selected. This rule is known as the "Riley Rule" and was introduced in the early 1990s after the dominance of the 1980s Los Angeles Lakers team in the Western Conference, which was coached by Pat Riley.

Only Lenny Wilkens (SuperSonics, Cavaliers, and Hawks), Alex Hannum (Hawks, Warriors, and 76ers), and Doc Rivers (Celtics, 76ers, and Bucks) have represented three separate teams as the All-Star Game coach. Red Auerbach, the head coach for the Boston Celtics between 1950 and 1966, coached the most All-Star Games with 11 appearances.

Darko Rajaković became the first full foreign-born coach to be selected as an All-Star Game head coach, having been selected to coach for the "World" All-Star team in the 2026 game.

17 of the coaches previously appeared in the All-Star Game as a player, with player-coach Bobby Wanzer being the first person to appear in the NBA All-Star Game as a player and as a coach, doing so in 1957 after previously appearing in the All-Star Game five times from 1952 to 1956. The list includes: Wanzer, Ed Macauley, Paul Seymour, Fred Schaus, Bill Sharman, Richie Guerin, Gene Shue, Larry Costello, Tom Heinsohn, Billy Cunningham, Lenny Wilkens, Paul Westphal, Rudy Tomjanovich, Doug Collins, Larry Bird, Isiah Thomas, and Doc Rivers. (Note: Larry Brown appeared in the ABA All-Star Game as a player and coach before coaching the NBA All-Star Game. Brown, Sharman, and Alex Hannum are the only people to have coached in both the NBA and ABA All-Star Game.)

== Key ==
^	Denotes coach who is currently coaching an NBA team
*	Elected to the Naismith Memorial Basketball Hall of Fame as a coach
Coach (X)	Denotes the number of times the coach has been selected, up to and including that season

=== Eastern Division / Conference (1951–2017) ===
Year	Head coach	Team	Ref.
1951	Joe Lapchick	New York Knicks	
1952	Al Cervi	Syracuse Nationals	
1953	Joe Lapchick (2)	New York Knicks	
1954	Joe Lapchick (3)	New York Knicks	
1955	Al Cervi (2)	Syracuse Nationals	
1956	George Senesky	Philadelphia Warriors	
1957	Red Auerbach*	Boston Celtics	
1958	Red Auerbach* (2)	Boston Celtics	
1959	Red Auerbach* (3)	Boston Celtics	
1960	Red Auerbach* (4)	Boston Celtics	
1961	Red Auerbach* (5)	Boston Celtics	
1962	Red Auerbach* (6)	Boston Celtics	
1963	Red Auerbach* (7)	Boston Celtics	
1964	Red Auerbach* (8)	Boston Celtics	
1965	Red Auerbach* (9)	Boston Celtics	
1966	Red Auerbach* (10)	Boston Celtics	
1967	Red Auerbach* (11)	None (Note: Red Auerbach stepped down from the Boston Celtics' head coaching position at the end of the 1965–66 season.)	
1968	Alex Hannum* (3)	Philadelphia 76ers	
1969	Gene Shue	Baltimore Bullets	
1970	Red Holzman*	New York Knicks	
1971	Red Holzman* (2)	New York Knicks	
1972	Tom Heinsohn*	Boston Celtics	
1973	Tom Heinsohn* (2)	Boston Celtics	
1974	Tom Heinsohn* (3)	Boston Celtics	
1975	K. C. Jones	Washington Bullets	
1976	Tom Heinsohn* (4)	Boston Celtics	
1977	Gene Shue (2)	Philadelphia 76ers	
1978	Billy Cunningham	Philadelphia 76ers	
1979	Dick Motta	Washington Bullets	
1980	Billy Cunningham (2)	Philadelphia 76ers	
1981	Billy Cunningham (3)	Philadelphia 76ers	
1982	Bill Fitch*	Boston Celtics	
1983	Billy Cunningham (4)	Philadelphia 76ers	
1984	K. C. Jones (2)	Boston Celtics	
1985	K. C. Jones (3)	Boston Celtics	
1986	K. C. Jones (4)	Boston Celtics	
1987	K. C. Jones (5)	Boston Celtics	
1988	Mike Fratello	Atlanta Hawks	
1989	Lenny Wilkens* (3)	Cleveland Cavaliers	
1990	Chuck Daly*	Detroit Pistons	
1991	Chris Ford	Boston Celtics	
1992	Phil Jackson*	Chicago Bulls	
1993	Pat Riley* (9)	New York Knicks	
1994	Lenny Wilkens* (4)	Atlanta Hawks	
1995	Brian Hill	Orlando Magic	
1996	Phil Jackson* (2)	Chicago Bulls	
1997	Doug Collins	Detroit Pistons	
1998	Larry Bird	Indiana Pacers	
2000	Jeff Van Gundy	New York Knicks	
2001	Larry Brown* (2)	Philadelphia 76ers	
2002	Byron Scott	New Jersey Nets	
2003	Isiah Thomas	Indiana Pacers	
2004	Rick Carlisle^	Indiana Pacers	
2005	Stan Van Gundy	Miami Heat	
2006	Flip Saunders (2)	Detroit Pistons	
2007	Eddie Jordan	Washington Wizards	
2008	Doc Rivers^	Boston Celtics	
2009	Mike Brown^	Cleveland Cavaliers	
2010	Stan Van Gundy (2)	Orlando Magic	
2011	Doc Rivers^ (2)	Boston Celtics	
2012	Tom Thibodeau	Chicago Bulls	
2013	Erik Spoelstra^	Miami Heat	
2014	Frank Vogel	Indiana Pacers	
2015	Mike Budenholzer	Atlanta Hawks	
2016	Tyronn Lue^	Cleveland Cavaliers	
2017	Brad Stevens	Boston Celtics	

=== Western Division / Conference (1951–2017) ===
Year	Head coach	Team	Ref.
1951	John Kundla*	Minneapolis Lakers	
1952	John Kundla* (2)	Minneapolis Lakers	
1953	John Kundla* (3)	Minneapolis Lakers	
1954	John Kundla* (4)	Minneapolis Lakers	
1955	Charley Eckman	Fort Wayne Pistons	
1956	Charley Eckman (2)	Fort Wayne Pistons	
1957	Bobby Wanzer	Rochester Royals	
1958	Alex Hannum*	St. Louis Hawks	
1959	Ed Macauley	St. Louis Hawks	
1960	Ed Macauley (2)	St. Louis Hawks	
1961	Paul Seymour	St. Louis Hawks	
1962	Fred Schaus	Los Angeles Lakers	
1963	Fred Schaus (2)	Los Angeles Lakers	
1964	Fred Schaus (3)	Los Angeles Lakers	
1965	Alex Hannum* (2)	San Francisco Warriors	
1966	Fred Schaus (4)	Los Angeles Lakers	
1967	Fred Schaus (5)	Los Angeles Lakers	
1968	Bill Sharman*	San Francisco Warriors	
1969	Richie Guerin	Atlanta Hawks	
1970	Richie Guerin (2)	Atlanta Hawks	
1971	Larry Costello	Milwaukee Bucks	
1972	Bill Sharman* (2)	Los Angeles Lakers	
1973	Bill Sharman* (3)	Los Angeles Lakers	
1974	Larry Costello (2)	Milwaukee Bucks	
1975	Al Attles	Golden State Warriors	
1976	Al Attles (2)	Golden State Warriors	
1977	Larry Brown*	Denver Nuggets	
1978	Jack Ramsay*	Portland Trail Blazers	
1979	Lenny Wilkens*	Seattle SuperSonics	
1980	Lenny Wilkens* (2)	Seattle SuperSonics	
1981	John MacLeod	Phoenix Suns	
1982	Pat Riley*	Los Angeles Lakers	
1983	Pat Riley* (2)	Los Angeles Lakers	
1984	Frank Layden	Utah Jazz	
1985	Pat Riley* (3)	Los Angeles Lakers	
1986	Pat Riley* (4)	Los Angeles Lakers	
1987	Pat Riley* (5)	Los Angeles Lakers	
1988	Pat Riley* (6)	Los Angeles Lakers	
1989	Pat Riley* (7)	Los Angeles Lakers	
1990	Pat Riley* (8)	Los Angeles Lakers	
1991	Rick Adelman*	Portland Trail Blazers	
1992	Don Nelson*	Golden State Warriors	
1993	Paul Westphal	Phoenix Suns	
1994	George Karl*	Seattle SuperSonics	
1995	Paul Westphal (2)	Phoenix Suns	
1996	George Karl* (2)	Seattle SuperSonics	
1997	Rudy Tomjanovich*	Houston Rockets	
1998	George Karl* (3)	Seattle SuperSonics	
2000	Phil Jackson* (3)	Los Angeles Lakers	
2001	Rick Adelman* (2)	Sacramento Kings	
2002	Don Nelson* (2)	Dallas Mavericks	
2003	Rick Adelman* (3)	Sacramento Kings	
2004	Flip Saunders	Minnesota Timberwolves	
2005	Gregg Popovich*	San Antonio Spurs	
2006	Avery Johnson	Dallas Mavericks	
2007	Mike D'Antoni	Phoenix Suns	
2008	Byron Scott (2)	New Orleans Hornets	
2009	Phil Jackson* (4)	Los Angeles Lakers	
2010	George Karl* (4)	Denver Nuggets	
2011	Gregg Popovich* (2)	San Antonio Spurs	
2012	Scott Brooks	Oklahoma City Thunder	
2013	Gregg Popovich* (3)	San Antonio Spurs	
2014	Scott Brooks (2)	Oklahoma City Thunder	
2015	Steve Kerr^	Golden State Warriors	
2016	Gregg Popovich* (4)	San Antonio Spurs	
2017	Steve Kerr^ (2)	Golden State Warriors	

=== Unconferenced format (2018–2023) ===
Year	Head coach	Team	All-Star Team	Ref.
2018	Dwane Casey	Toronto Raptors	Team LeBron	
2018	Mike D'Antoni (2)	Houston Rockets	Team Steph	
2019	Mike Budenholzer (2)	Milwaukee Bucks	Team Giannis	
2019	Michael Malone	Denver Nuggets	Team LeBron	
2020	Nick Nurse^	Toronto Raptors	Team Giannis	
2020	Frank Vogel (2)	Los Angeles Lakers	Team LeBron	
2021	Doc Rivers^ (3)	Philadelphia 76ers	Team Durant	
2021	Quin Snyder^	Utah Jazz	Team LeBron	
2022	Monty Williams	Phoenix Suns	Team LeBron	
2022	Erik Spoelstra^ (2)	Miami Heat	Team Durant	
2023	Michael Malone (2)	Denver Nuggets	Team LeBron	
2023	Joe Mazzulla^	Boston Celtics	Team Giannis	

=== Eastern Conference (2024) ===
Year	Head coach	Team	Ref.
2024	Doc Rivers^ (4)	Milwaukee Bucks	

=== Western Conference (2024) ===
Year	Head coach	Team	Ref.
2024	Chris Finch^	Minnesota Timberwolves	

=== Tournament format (2025–present) ===
Year	Head coach	Team	All-Star Team	Ref.
2025	Jordan Ott^	Cleveland Cavaliers	Candace's Rising Stars	
2025	Mark Daigneault^	Oklahoma City Thunder	Chuck's Global Stars	
2025	Dave Bliss	Oklahoma City Thunder	Kenny's Young Stars	
2025	Kenny Atkinson^	Cleveland Cavaliers	Shaq's OGs	
2026	J. B. Bickerstaff^	Detroit Pistons	USA Stars	
2026	Mitch Johnson^	San Antonio Spurs	USA Stripes	
2026	Darko Rajaković^	Toronto Raptors	Team World	

=== Most selections ===
Head coach	#	Selections
Red Auerbach	11	1957–1967 (East)
Pat Riley	9	1982–1983; 1985–1990 (West); 1993 (East)
K. C. Jones	5	1975; 1984–1987 (East)
Fred Schaus	5	1962–1964; 1966–1967 (West)
John Kundla	4	1951–1954 (West)
Tom Heinsohn	4	1972–1974; 1976 (East)
Billy Cunningham	4	1978; 1980–1981; 1983 (East)
Lenny Wilkens	4	1979–1980 (West); 1989; 1994 (East)
Phil Jackson	4	1992; 1996 (East); 2000; 2009 (West)
George Karl	4	1994; 1996; 1998; 2010 (West)
Gregg Popovich	4	2005; 2011; 2013; 2016 (West)
Doc Rivers	4	2008; 2011; 2024 (East); 2021 (Unconferenced)
Joe Lapchick	3	1951; 1953–1954 (East)
Bill Sharman	3	1968; 1972–1973 (West)
Alex Hannum	3	1958; 1965 (West); 1968 (East)
Rick Adelman	3	1991; 2001; 2003 (West)
