= Porterville High School =

High school in Porterville, California, US

Information
- Established: 1896; 130 years ago
- Principal: Jose Valdez
- Teaching staff: 83.83 (FTE)
- Grades: 9-12
- Enrollment: 2,136 (2023–2024)
- Student to teacher ratio: 25.48
- Color
- Team name: Panthers

Porterville High School is a high school located in Porterville, California. The school was erected in 1896. It is part of the Porterville Unified School District and has students enrolled from 9–12 grade. It is named for the city of Porterville.

== Timeline ==
1896

The high school was added to the elementary school of Porterville and located in the east room of the second story of the Morton Street School.

1905–1927

The school was transferred to a granite structure located between Belleview and Morton streets and facing E Street. Beginning about 1913/4, for commercial studies; at the west, for chemistry and physics. In 1914/5, a wood and mechanics shop was located at the northwest. In 1918, a cafeteria was built to provide the facilities for home economics and across the street at the south. In 1920, there was an auto mechanics shop and bus garage.

The school moved into the school "plant," erected on Olive Street adjoining J Street. In 1922, following the voting of the bonds in 1921 (after an unsuccessful attempt in 1920) - the plant included the 350-foot (110 m) main building (shaped like a letter E with its back to the north); southeast of that gymnasium (which burned down and was rebuilt in 1933) with the addition of a basketball court; and south of the gym, a building for the shops (woodwork, ironwork, and auto-mechanics and for the agricultural classes; and south of the shops, at the care-taker's residence (the only wooden building, the others being reinforced concrete) which had been the home of the former owner Mr. A. Kennedy) of the 20-acre (81,000 m^{2}) tract, across the south end of which was the athletic field. A water-pumping system was installed near the care-taker's residence. A junior college was added to the high school in 1928, which necessitated the adding of two rooms to the main building in its west court and other enlargements were added in March 1938.

1930s

In 1930, a building erected for the 11 buses which had been housed in the auto-mechanics department. The athletics field building for boys' changing rooms and equipment was built in 1934 which was enclosed with an iron fence. Two agricultural rooms were built in 1935 on the east side of the shop building and another two rooms for medical and health education was added a year later. A music department was built in 1937.

== The Porterville District ==
1896–1910

Porterville High School was supported by the Porterville district of the elementary school system of the county, with the provision that students coming from outside that district may be charged a tuition fee.

1910–1927

Porterville Union High School, first a union because in 1910 the neighborhood near the old Indian Reservation did not withdraw from the high school when it set up the Reservation (now Alta-Vista) district separate from Porterville Elementary School. From February 1920, the following districts were added to the union: Burton, Citrus-South Tule (united since 1920, South Tule having already annexed La Motte); Ducor (which since then took over Fountain Springs and part of Wheatland, California); Hope; Olive; Orange: Pleasant View; Rockford, California; Vincent; and later in the same year, Springville (now a union including Dennison joining PHS in 1930 --, Mountain View, Mount Whitney and North Tule); Sausalito, in January 1921; Terra Bella in 1924 (now a union including Deer Creek, Grand View Heights, and Zion, California) joining PUHS in May 1930. The Porterville Elementary District now consolidated: Worth in 1924, Vandalia in 1925, and Miles in 1932. These are the fifteen districts of the Porterville Union High School in 1938; but before so much consolidation they numbered some 24.

1927–1938

Porterville Union High School and Junior College, in which the addition of a junior college did not change the extent of the district but admitted junior college students from Strathmore, Lindsay, Exeter and Tulare high schools, for which the county pays, chargeable to the districts, the overhead cost for the students (something over $100 per student).

== Notable alumni ==
- Dick Brooks - NASCAR driver, 1969 NASCAR "Rookie of the Year"
- Vernon Grant - an artist and creator of Kellogg's characters: "Snap", "Crackle", and "Pop", graduated from Porterville High School, class of 1921
- Allen Drury - novelist and 1960 Pulitzer Prize winner
- Rick Owens - fashion designer
- Bill Sharman - National Basketball Association player and member of the Naismith Memorial Basketball Hall of Fame
- Joe Soto - professional wrestler; professional Mixed Martial Artist formerly with the UFC and former Bellator MMA featherweight champion
- Buzz Stephen - Major League Baseball pitcher for the Minnesota Twins
