= 1955 NBA All-Star Game =

Basketball game

1955 NBA All Star Game
	1	2	3	4	Total
East	21	28	21	30	100
West	21	29	21	20	91
- Date: Tuesday, January 18, 1955
- Arena: Madison Square Garden (III)
- City: New York City
- MVP: Bill Sharman
- Attendance: 15,564

NBA All-Star Game
< 1954	1956 >

The 5th Annual NBA All Star Game was an exhibition basketball game played on January 18, 1955, at the Madison Square Garden (MSG III) in New York City, home of the New York Knickerbockers. This marked the second straight time that the NBA All-Star Game was held in New York City.

The coaches were the Fort Wayne Pistons' Charley Eckman for the West and the Syracuse Nationals' Al Cervi for the East, as both teams had led their respective divisions entering the month of January.

The East won the game 100–91. Bill Sharman was named the game's Most Valuable Player after scoring 10 of his 15 points in the fourth quarter, while his Boston Celtics teammate Bob Cousy led all scorers with 20 points.

== Roster ==
Eastern All-Stars
Pos.	Player	Team	No. of selections
Starters
G	Bob Cousy	Boston Celtics	5th
F/C	Harry Gallatin	New York Knickerbockers	5th
C/F	Ed Macauley	Boston Celtics	5th
F/C	Dolph Schayes	Syracuse Nationals	5th
G	Paul Seymour	Syracuse Nationals	3rd
Reserves
F	Paul Arizin	Philadelphia Warriors	3rd
G	Carl Braun	New York Knickerbockers	3rd
C	Neil Johnston	Philadelphia Warriors	3rd
G/F	Dick McGuire	New York Knickerbockers	4th
G	Bill Sharman	Boston Celtics	3rd
Head coach: Al Cervi (Syracuse Nationals)

Western All-Stars
Pos.	Player	Team	No. of selections
Starters
F/C	Larry Foust	Fort Wayne Pistons	5th
G	Andy Phillip	Fort Wayne Pistons	5th
F	Jim Pollard	Minneapolis Lakers	4th
G	Bobby Wanzer	Rochester Royals	4th
F/G	George Yardley	Fort Wayne Pistons	1st
Reserves
F/C	Jack Coleman	Rochester Royals	1st
G	Slater Martin	Minneapolis Lakers	3rd
F/C	Vern Mikkelsen	Minneapolis Lakers	4th
F/C	Bob Pettit	Milwaukee Hawks	1st
C	Arnie Risen	Rochester Royals	4th
G/F	Frank Selvy	Milwaukee Hawks	1st
Head coach:Charles Eckman (Fort Wayne Pistons)

== Eastern Division ==
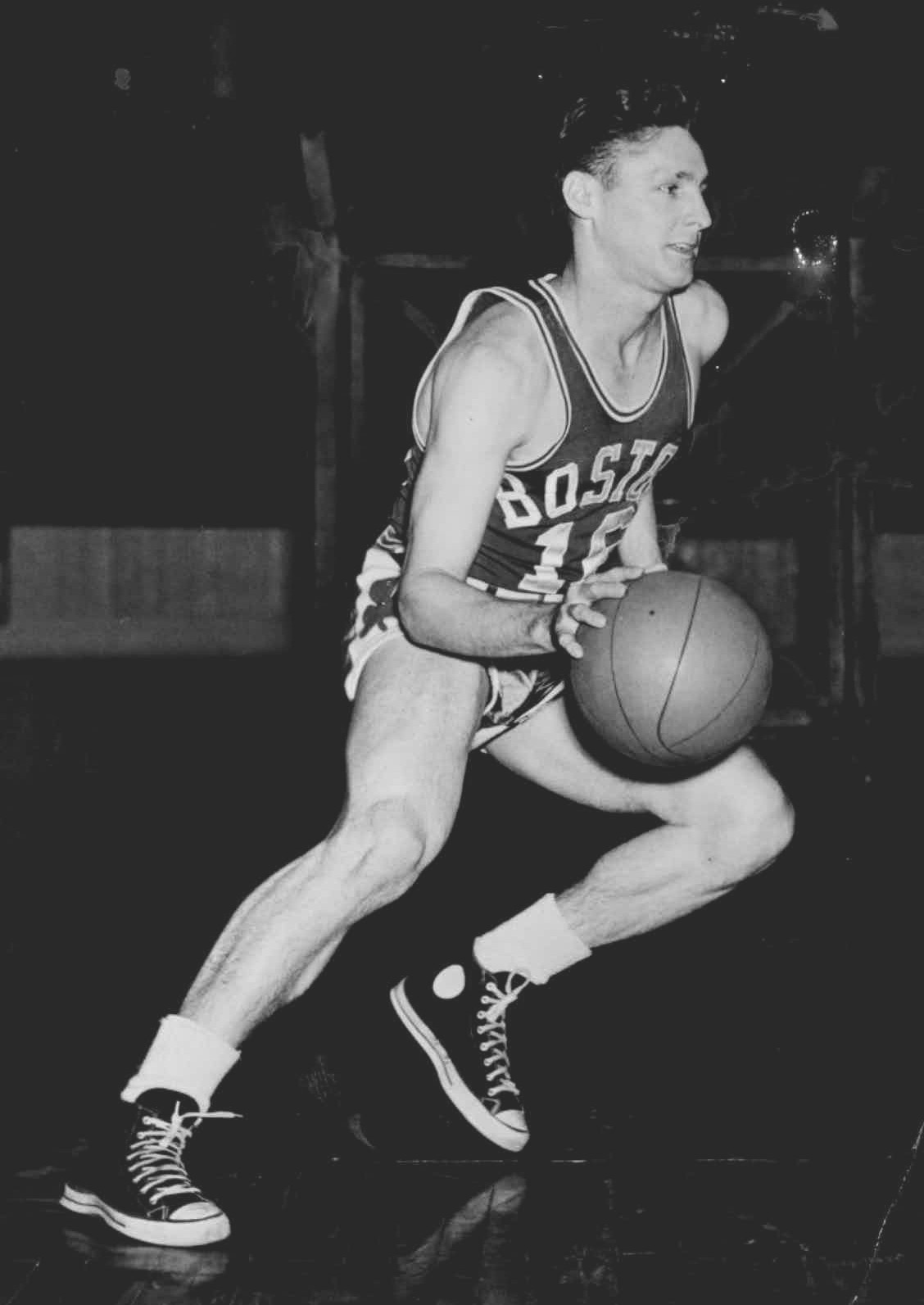
The East's Bill Sharman was named the All-Star Game MVP

Legend
	Starter		MVP	MIN	Minutes played
FG	Field goals	FGA	Field goal attempts	FT	Free throws	FTA	Free throw attempts
REB	Rebounds	AST	Assists	PF	Personal fouls	PTS	Points

Head Coach: Al Cervi, Syracuse Nationals

Player	Team	MIN	FG	FGA	FT	FTA	REB	AST	PF	PTS
Harry Gallatin	New York Knickerbockers	36	4	7	5	5	14	3	2	13
Bob Cousy	Boston Celtics	35	7	14	6	7	9	5	1	20
Dolph Schayes	Syracuse Nationals	29	6	12	3	3	13	1	4	15
Ed Macauley	Boston Celtics	27	1	5	4	5	4	2	1	6
Paul Seymour	Syracuse Nationals	16	3	8	2	2	3	1	1	8
Dick McGuire	New York Knickerbockers	25	1	2	1	2	3	6	1	3
Paul Arizin	Philadelphia Warriors	23	4	9	1	2	2	2	5	9
Bill Sharman	Boston Celtics	18	5	10	5	5	4	2	4	15
Carl Braun	New York Knickerbockers	16	4	6	0	0	2	2	2	8
Neil Johnston	Philadelphia Warriors	15	1	7	1	1	6	1	0	3
Totals		240	36	80	28	32	60	25	21	100

== Western Division ==
Head Coach: Charley Eckman, Fort Wayne Pistons

Player	Team	MIN	FG	FGA	FT	FTA	REB	AST	PF	PTS
Andy Phillip	Fort Wayne Pistons	28	3	4	0	0	3	6	3	6
Jim Pollard	Minneapolis Lakers	27	7	19	3	3	4	0	1	17
Bobby Wanzer	Rochester Royals	26	3	7	2	2	3	2	4	8
Larry Foust	Fort Wayne Pistons	24	3	10	1	1	7	1	1	7
George Yardley	Fort Wayne Pistons	22	4	11	3	4	4	2	2	11
Bob Pettit	Milwaukee Hawks	27	3	14	2	4	9	2	0	8
Vern Mikkelsen	Minneapolis Lakers	25	7	15	2	3	9	1	5	16
Slater Martin	Minneapolis Lakers	23	2	5	1	2	2	5	3	5
Frank Selvy	Milwaukee Hawks	19	2	7	3	4	3	1	4	7
Jack Coleman	Rochester Royals	19	2	8	2	3	6	1	0	6
Arnie Risen	Rochester Royals	Did not play due to injury								
Totals		240	36	100	19	26	50	21	23	91
