= 1956 NBA All-Star Game =

Exhibition basketball game

	1	2	3	4	Total
West	17	26	41	24	108
East	24	16	24	30	94
- Date: Tuesday, January 24, 1956
- Arena: Rochester War Memorial Coliseum
- City: Rochester
- MVP: Bob Pettit
- Attendance: 8,517
- Network: WPIX
- Announcers: Bud Palmer, Jimmy Powers and Kevin Kennedy

NBA All-Star Game
< 1955	1957 >

The 6th Annual NBA All Star Game was an exhibition basketball game held on January 24, 1956, at the Rochester War Memorial Coliseum in Rochester, New York, home of the Rochester Royals. As of date, this was the only NBA All-Star Game held at Rochester, as the Royals, now known as the Sacramento Kings, would relocate to Cincinnati in 1957.

The coaches were the Fort Wayne Pistons' Charley Eckman for the West and the Philadelphia Warriors' George Senesky for the East, as both teams had led their respective divisions prior to the game. The West won the game 108–94. Bob Pettit was named the Most Valuable Player.

== Roster ==
Western All-Stars
Pos.	Player	Team	No. of selections
Starters
F/C	Larry Foust	Fort Wayne Pistons	6th
F/C	Mel Hutchins	Fort Wayne Pistons	3rd
G	Slater Martin	Minneapolis Lakers	4th
G	Bobby Wanzer	Rochester Royals	5th
F/G	George Yardley	Fort Wayne Pistons	2nd
Reserves
G	Bob Harrison	St. Louis Hawks	1st
C	Clyde Lovellette	Minneapolis Lakers	1st
F/C	Vern Mikkelsen	Minneapolis Lakers	5th
F/C	Bob Pettit	St. Louis Hawks	2nd
F/C	Maurice Stokes	Rochester Royals	1st
Head coach: Charles Eckman (Fort Wayne Pistons)

Eastern All-Stars
Pos.	Player	Team	No. of selections
Starters
F	Paul Arizin	Philadelphia Warriors	4th
G	Bob Cousy	Boston Celtics	6th
C	Neil Johnston	Philadelphia Warriors	4th
G	Dick McGuire	New York Knickerbockers	5th
F/C	Dolph Schayes	Syracuse Nationals	6th
Reserves
G	Carl Braun	New York Knickerbockers	4th
F/C	Harry Gallatin	New York Knickerbockers	6th
G	Jack George	Philadelphia Warriors	1st
C	Red Kerr	Syracuse Nationals	1st
F/C	Ed Macauley	Boston Celtics	6th
G	Bill Sharman	Boston Celtics	4th
Head coach:George Senesky (Philadelphia Warriors)

== Western Division ==
Head Coach: Charley Eckman, Fort Wayne Pistons

Legend
	Starter		MVP	MIN	Minutes played
FG	Field goals	FGA	Field goal attempts	FT	Free throws	FTA	Free throw attempts
REB	Rebounds	AST	Assists	PF	Personal fouls	PTS	Points

Player	Team	MIN	FG	FGA	FT	FTA	REB	AST	PF	PTS
Slater Martin	Minneapolis Lakers	29	3	7	3	3	1	7	5	9
Mel Hutchins	Fort Wayne Pistons	27	5	11	1	2	4	0	0	11
Bobby Wanzer	Rochester Royals	25	4	8	5	6	5	2	4	13
Larry Foust	Fort Wayne Pistons	20	3	9	3	4	4	0	1	9
George Yardley	Fort Wayne Pistons	19	3	7	2	3	6	1	1	8
Bob Pettit	St. Louis Hawks	31	7	17	6	7	24	7	4	20
Bob Harrison	St. Louis Hawks	25	2	7	1	2	0	1	4	5
Vern Mikkelsen	Minneapolis Lakers	22	5	13	6	7	9	2	4	16
Maurice Stokes	Rochester Royals	20	4	11	2	5	16	2	5	10
Clyde Lovellette	Minneapolis Lakers	20	3	10	1	3	10	0	4	7
Totals		240	39	100	30	42	79	22	32	108

== Eastern Division ==
Head Coach: George Senesky, Philadelphia Warriors

Player	Team	MIN	FG	FGA	FT	FTA	REB	AST	PF	PTS
Dick McGuire	New York Knickerbockers	29	2	9	2	5	0	3	1	6
Paul Arizin	Philadelphia Warriors	28	5	13	3	5	7	1	6	13
Neil Johnston	Philadelphia Warriors	25	5	9	7	11	10	1	3	17
Dolph Schayes	Syracuse Nationals	25	4	8	6	10	4	2	2	14
Bob Cousy	Boston Celtics	24	2	8	3	4	7	2	6	7
Harry Gallatin	New York Knickerbockers	30	5	12	6	7	5	2	4	16
Bill Sharman	Boston Celtics	24	2	8	3	4	7	2	6	7
Jack George	Philadelphia Warriors	21	2	7	2	2	3	2	1	6
Ed Macauley	Boston Celtics	20	1	9	2	4	2	3	3	4
Red Kerr	Syracuse Nationals	16	2	4	0	1	8	0	2	4
Carl Braun	New York Knickerbockers	Did not play due to injury								
Totals		240	30	87	34	53	53	18	34	94
