= Shootaround =

Informal basketball practice session

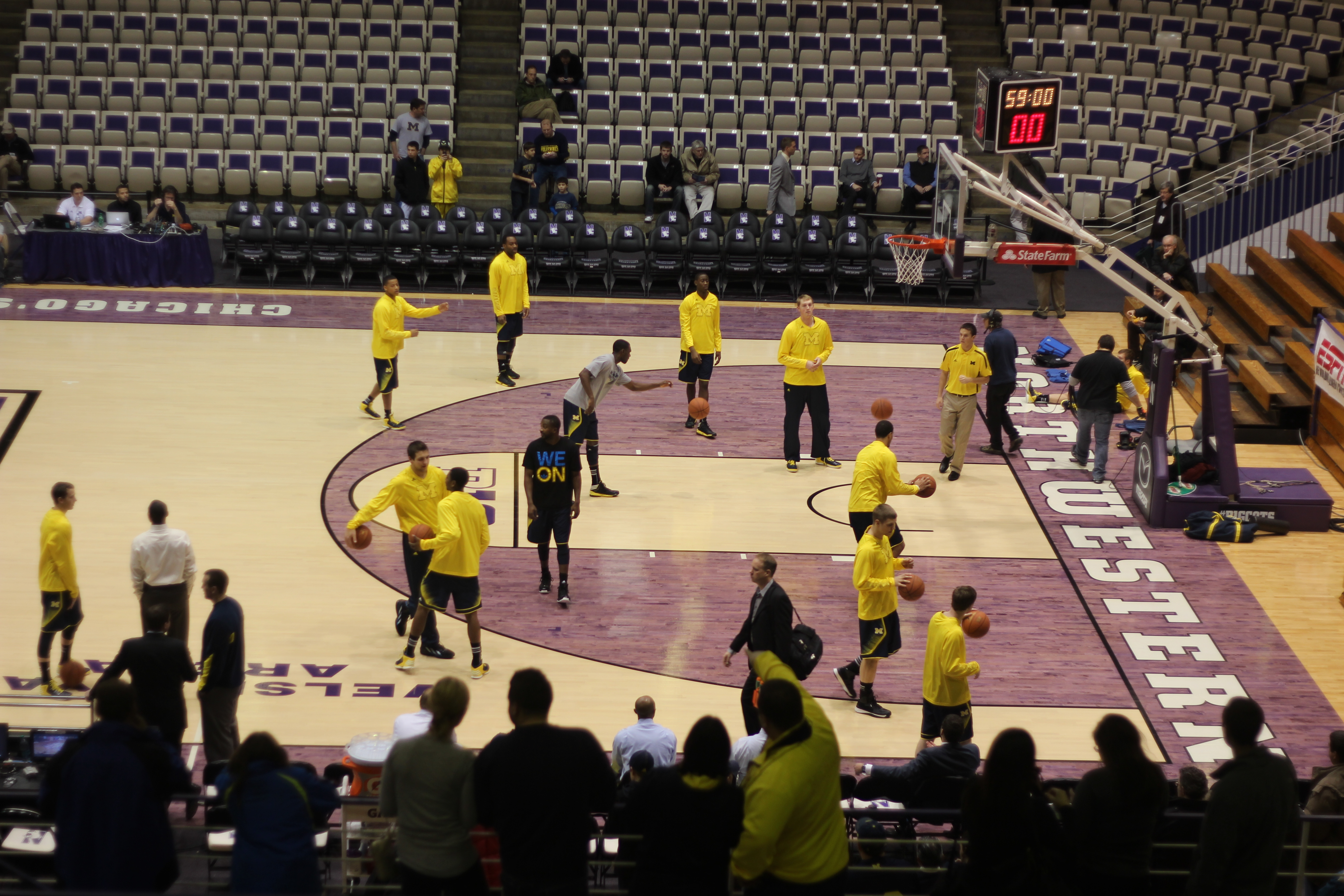
Pregame shootaround of the 2012–13 Michigan Wolverines in their 2012–13 Big Ten Conference season opener at Welsh-Ryan Arena on January 3, 2013

A shootaround is an informal pre-game practice session common among professional and collegiate basketball teams around the world.

Shootarounds do not involve all of the formal elements of a regular practice. They usually do not involve conditioning drills, run-throughs of plays and extensive chalk-talks by coaches like normal practice sessions. The practice is largely informal and may consist of players practicing their shooting, with five or six players shooting at one basket and rebounding others' shots.

NBA Hall-of-Famer Bill Sharman invented the morning shootaround as a way to burn off nervous energy on game days. He took the shootaround with him to his first coaching jobs in the ABL, ABA, and later, the NBA. After coaching the Los Angeles Lakers to the league championship in 1972, every other team in the league added the shootaround to its game-day regimen.

The shootaround is a staple of the pre-game warmup routine for all NBA teams, most college teams, and many teams at all levels. So infused is the term into basketball's lexicon, in fact, that ESPN's NBA re-cap show is called NBA Shootaround.
