= Charley Eckman =

American basketball coach and referee

Personal information
- Born: September 10, 1921 Baltimore, Maryland, U.S.
- Died: July 3, 1995 (aged 73)
- Coaching career: 1954–1957

Career history

Coaching
- 1954–1957: Fort Wayne / Detroit Pistons

Career highlights
- 2× NBA All-Star Game head coach (1955, 1956)

Charles Markwood Eckman Jr. (September 10, 1921 – July 3, 1995) was an American basketball head coach and professional basketball referee for the National Basketball Association (NBA). He is the only person to have ever officiated and coached in an NBA All-Star Game. Eckman also officiated college basketball for many years, including the 1961 NCAA Division I men's championship game, and six straight Atlantic Coast Conference championship games. Eckman was also a sports broadcaster, respected horse racing handicapper and professional baseball scout.

== Early life ==
Eckman was born on September 10, 1921, in Baltimore, Maryland, to Charles Markwood Eckman Sr. and Marie Margaret Eckman. Eckman's father fought during World War I and was gassed during the Meuse–Argonne offensive in France. His father survived the war, but died from his wounds when Eckman was 12 years old. After that, Eckman and his mother struggled to make ends meet during the Depression. He went to work as a helper on a delivery truck for the Cambria's Bugle Coat and Apron Company that same year his father died. He was a bat boy for the Baltimore Black Sox and/or the Albany Senators when visiting Baltimore, making 25-cents a game.

He graduated from Baltimore City College high school in 1939, where he was classmates with future Maryland governors Marvin Mandell and William Donald Schaefer, who both said Eckman retained the same colorful personality throughout his life. He was an All-Maryland second baseman on the City College baseball team. In 1941, he was selected to the Maryland Amateur Baseball Association All-Star Team.

Eckman was a three-sport star as a youngster, excelling in baseball, basketball and track. He also played soccer in his youth. Among the odd jobs Eckman did to raise extra money, at 16 years old he officiated amateur basketball games five or six nights a week for 50 cents a game. He was drafted by the Washington Senators after graduating from Baltimore City College and played in their farm system, but never made it to playing Major League Baseball. In 1940, he played Class D minor league baseball for the Mooresville Moores, in Mooresville, North Carolina, part of the North Carolina State League. One of his teammates was future major league Hall of Fame pitcher Hoyt Wilhelm. He was later traded that same year to the Newton-Conover Twins, after which his professional baseball playing career soon ended.

Eckman met his wife Wilma Howard in Mooresville, and they married after a very brief courtship of less than one week.

== Officiating career ==
Eckman's first experience as a referee came at 16-years old. He recognized he was not going to make it as a professional baseball or basketball player, but knew he could reach the top as a referee. He studied local Baltimore referees Jim Boyer (who had been an American League umpire) and Johnny Neun who had played and managed in Major League Baseball, and approached Boyer for guidance. Boyer encouraged Eckman to pursue becoming a referee; and Neun helped him get work as a referee. As his family needed the money, he refereed as many games as possible; sometimes three on Sundays in different locations.

Eckman continued officiating in Baltimore until 1941, reaching the local pinnacle of the Baltimore Basketball League, where he could make $7.50 per game. His officiating career was interrupted in 1942 when he was drafted into the United States Army. He was later transferred to the Army Air Corps, and was ultimately stationed in Yuma, Arizona, serving as a physical training instructor, and refereeing basketball games in his spare time.

Upon his discharge in 1945, Eckman moved his wife and newborn son to Arizona, where he had been stationed. He continued to officiate basketball games, this time with the American Basketball League West Coast, while working for the Phoenix office of the War Assets Administration. In 1946–47, he teamed with Frank Lubin to officiate games for such teams as the Oakland Bittners and the Hollywood Shamrocks (also known as the Carroll Shamrocks) of the American Basketball League, and Amateur Athletic Union teams like the San Diego Dons. He also officiated Southwestern Conference college games in Arizona, New Mexico and Texas.

Eckman returned to Baltimore with his family in 1947, and began working full time for Westinghouse. He continued his work as a referee. He was hired by Basketball Association of America (BAA) Chief Referee Pat Kennedy, originally just working on Saturdays; but was hired full time by league commission Maurice Podoloff in 1948 during a Westinghous strike. The BAA merged with the National Basketball League (NBL) in the summer of 1949 and became the National Basketball Association. The original NBA referees were Eckman, Kennedy, Arnold Heft, Louie Eisenstein, Sid Borgia, Joe Serafin and Phil Fox. He was especially fond of officiating games in Sheboygan Wisconsin that season, despite being trapped there by snow and ice. Among other referees, Eckman joined Kennedy, Borgia, Max Tabacchi and future Hall of Fame umpire Jocko Conlin in the 1950 NBA season, making $50/game for working 23 games per month.

Eckman officiated at the first NBA All-Star Game in 1951, and later was the head coach of the Western Conference All-Star teams in 1955, and 1956, becoming the only person to have officiated and coached in an NBA All-Star Game. After a playoff game in March 1951 between the New York Knicks and Syracuse Nationals in Syracuse, Eckman and fellow referee Julie Myers had to ask for police protection after they were embroiled in volatile arguments with both coaches and the Nationals' owner.

In 1952, he was part of an experiment, along with Myers, to officiate the game seated in tennis judges' chairs, rather than on the court with the players. Eckman helped train future Naismith Hall of Fame official Mendy Rudolph as an NBA referee. Eckman was ranked as one of the top officials in the NBA during his time as a referee, until 1954, when Pistons owner Fred Zollner signed the 32-year-old Eckman to a three-year coaching contract.

After his NBA coaching career ended in December 1957, Eckman eventually returned to officiate college basketball in the Atlantic Coast Conference (ACC), the Southern Conference, the Eastern Conference and the Ivy League. He worked across conferences, a nomad referee, and most frequently in the American South where he was paid more. Eckman found Greenville, South Carolina the most hospitable city in which to referee of anywhere he had been. Once during a game involving Dean Smith's North Carolina Tar Heels when Smith was using his delaying four-corners offense, Eckman got a folding chair and sat on it while the North Carolina Players dribbled away. He was considered one of the best basketball referees in the United States, and officiated six consecutive ACC tournament championship games from 1958 to 1963. He officiated the 1961 NCAA championship game between the University of Cincinnati and Ohio State University.

He returned to refereeing in the NBA in 1964, replacing Sid Borgia who was made supervisor of referees. Earlier that year, Frank Deford of Sports Illustrated had called Eckman, while still a college referee, "unquestionably the most colorful official in the game". He joined a staff of officials that included Naismith Hall of Fame referees Mendy Rudolph and Earl Strom, Norm Drucker, Joe Gushue, Don Murphy, Richie Powers, Paul Ruddy and John Vanek. During the 1964 NBA season, when play on the court was particularly physical and players were being injured, some claimed that the referees were failing to call fouls when needed. Eckman was quoted as lamenting at the time "it's just too much judgment".

Not long after, Eckman retired from the NBA, and gave his broader perspective on the purported rough play. He believed the games were being called tightly enough, but that the NBA did not have enough officials, and that the league was relying too much on inexperienced officials who did not yet know how to control a game. Fans, coaches and players were so abusive towards referees, that this also discouraged people from wanting to become NBA referees. In addition to its being a thankless job, he observed "There's no security, no pension. The only security I ever had was getting out of town safely and hoping the plane stayed up".

Eckman continued refereeing college basketball until March 1967. He was only 45-years old at the time. He believed that fan behavior was getting worse at college games, with conduct like throwing heated pennies (Duke) or rubber balls (Maryland) at opposing players or occasionally referees. In 1967, after 29 years and over 3,500 collegiate and professional basketball games, Eckman, announced his retirement from officiating, after experiencing leg problems. Eckman is the only person to have ever officiated the NIT, NCAA and NBA Finals games.

=== Refereeing style ===
Eckman said "I'm a players' referee. ... I try to satisfy the players". He did not try to intimidate players or make himself out to be a tough guy, but believed firmness and courtesy worked best. Eckman was good natured and took the view a basketball game was meant to be pleasurable. He would try to settle players down, even making jokes like "you don't shoot well enough to argue with me", or advise them on how to avoid unnecessary fouls, such as "watch the elbow...ease up...lemme see some daylight".

Eckman considered himself a nonconformist as a referee, making independence and integrity central to his role as a referee. He was helpful to young referees who were learning their trade, and was aware of when to restrain them in games. He understood how quickly the attitudes of players, coaches and fans could change from play to play, based on the calls he made and their biases in whether the calls favored their side. Eckman ignored flattery, and the bitterness from fans; instead focusing on treating players fairly and respectfully. Former ACC player, assistant coach and longtime television college basketball analyst Billy Packer said of Eckman, "He's the only official that any player–whether he's [a star like] Art Heyman or a substitute–can figure will give him an even break every time".

He would listen to a coach's dissatisfaction in the heat of a game, but then let it pass. Wake Forest coach Bones McKinney said Eckman was unique in his refereeing style, and always kept the game moving forward in the right direction; and that Eckman did not waste time in a game or antagonize the players. Eckman believed his main role was to protect the shooter; yet he also gave considerable thought on how blocking and charging fouls were called, understanding that the rules at the time in college basketball generally favored the defense. He believed he had to be quick and decisive in making a call, trusting in his experience rather than taking a more studied intellectual approach to the game. He also recognized that a referee had to use their judgment in how the rules were applied; observing that on any one play he could identify six fouls among all the holding and pushing players did in going for a rebound.

Eckman said "Officiating in 90 per cent guts and 2 per cent rule book. Look, ball goes out of bounds, you call blue or red and you can only be right or wrong. You make that decision, you bop it out loud so every yo-yo in the place can hear it, and if you do blow one, you grab the ball and you run down the court smiling bop-de-bop-bop". He is also quoted as saying that officiating is "90 per cent guts and judgment and 10 per cent rule book", while the fans view was that the referee should favor their team in making calls.

== Coaching career ==
In 1954, Fort Wayne Pistons' owner Fred Zollner hired 32-year old Eckman as head coach for the 1954–55 team; giving him a three-year contract. Eckman had been an NBA referee for seven years, but had no professional coaching experience, much less as an NBA head coach. Zollner chose Eckman on his own, without seeking any advice from others. Zollner liked how Eckman handled players as a referee, and recalled a 1951 interaction he had witnessed between Eckman and Minneapolis Laker Hall of Fame center George Mikan after a game between the Lakers and Milwaukee Hawks that made Zollner believe Eckman might want to coach. Mikan had come over to Eckman after the game ended, patted Eckman on the head and said "Nice game fella. You're all right". Eckman responded "Ah, cut it out. You'll see the day when I'm coaching guys like you". In another telling, Zollner said he was with Eckman at a party after the 1951 Milwaukee game, among a group of people who were flattering Eckman about his refereeing skill. Eckman responded "I want to be a coach", and that remained in Zollner's memory.

Before entering his first training camp as a coach in 1954, Eckman asked Navy basketball coach Ben Carnevale to teach him some drills to use with his team. Even absent coaching experience, Eckman believed he would succeed as a coach because he understood how to substitute players; and understood that the key to winning was finding successful player matchups during games, in a league that required man-to-man defense.

In the 1954–55 season, Eckman led the Pistons to their best record in team history (43–29) and first place in the Western Division. Eckman took the team to the 1955 NBA finals behind play of Larry Foust, George Yardley and Andy Phillip, all of whom were starters for the Western Division in the January 1955 All-Star Game. Yardley played less than 24 minutes per game as a rookie in 1953–54, but Eckman saw Yardley's ability to shoot and jump, and made Yardley a starter. Yardley averaged nearly 36 minutes and 17.3 points and 9.9 rebounds per game that season, and went on to a Hall of Fame career. During the 1955 NBA Finals, the Pistons lost a hard-fought seven-game series to the Syracuse Nationals, losing in Game 7, 92–91. The first-year head coach was honored as NBA Coach of the Year.

The following season, Eckman led the Pistons to another trip to the NBA Finals, where the Pistons fell to the Philadelphia Warriors, 4–1. In his third season as head coach, Eckman led the Pistons to the playoffs, where they lost to the Minneapolis Lakers in the semifinals.

During the 1957–58 season, the Pistons relocated from Fort Wayne, Indiana to Detroit, Michigan. Unfortunately for Eckman, his stay in Detroit did not last long. He was relieved of his coaching duties just 25 games into the season following a 9–16 start; though it is also reported he resigned before he could be fired. Eckman himself said at the time, "Resignation is a nice way to put it". After a 25-point loss in New York, Zollner called Eckman and told him "I think we'll have to make a change in your department"; Eckman soon realizing after the call ended that he was the only one in his department since he had no assistant coaches. He held no grudge against Zollner or the Piston's organization.

He had signed a three-year contract with the Pistons before the 1957–58 season. After being fired, he settled the contract with the Pistons for a payment of $26,000, paid out at $1,000 per month. Eckman's overall coaching record was 123–118. After a post-coaching hiatus, he eventually returned to officiating.

Eckman found coaching much easier than being a referee, calling it a vacation by comparison.

== Baseball scout ==
Eckman was a baseball scout for the National League's Milwaukee Braves. He also scouted for the Philadelphia Phillies. For the Braves, his duties encompassed the Delaware, Maryland and Pennsylvania region. During his time as a scout from the 1950s into the 1960s he saw significant changes in the sport, with improved equipment, lights being added for night games at all levels of baseball, platooning of players, and the growing dominance of pitching over hitting. He believed the latter was the result of evolving specialization in pitching, which came to include starting pitchers, long relief pitchers, middle relief pitchers and short relief pitchers (closers); as well as more games being played at night. He also believed that the defensive positions requiring the highest level of consistency and skill were catcher, second base, shortstop and center field (which formed the backbone of a team's defense); while other positions would often be played interchangeably by those with lesser skills as fielders (with some exceptions like third basemen Brooks Robinson, Frank Malzone and Clete Boyer).

Eckman also observed that the growth in the number of scouts over the years reduced the likelihood of finding unknown players with great potential that other teams might miss; and that the traditional scouting function had become more of a scanning function. He witnessed a decrease in minor league teams, and also believed that high school aged players should not be mixed on teams with older players.

== Broadcasting career ==
Eckman was considered a Baltimore radio and television personality. Eckman began working as a sportscaster/commentator on the radio in 1961 with "The voice of the Chesapeake Bay." He worked for WYRE in Annapolis, Maryland. Later in 1965, Eckman accepted a position as sportscaster for WCBM and was hired away in 1970 by WFBR, where he worked until retiring in 1987. Even after retirement, he was appearing three times a week on WCBM, and occasionally on Baltimore's Home Team Sports television talk shows. Eckman became an award-winning radio sportscaster, handling color commentary for the Baltimore Bullets, Orioles, Colts and Blast; as well as at Penn National racecourse. He was a panelist on Baltimore television station WJZ-TV's "Square Off" public affairs program.

== Legacy and honors ==
In 1964, Frank Deford wrote in Sports Illustrated, "Eckman is the most colorful basketball official in the country, but the kicker is that he may also be the best". At one time, he was the highest paid NBA referee. Original Baltimore Bullets coach Buddy Jeannette said "Eckman had a barrel of guts. He didn't care if he made a call that brought the house down on him. He made the tough call on the road".

Eckman has been inducted into the Pennsylvania Sports Hall of Fame for his involvement with horse racing, and in the inaugural class of the Anne Arundel County, Maryland Sports Hall of Fame (1991).

== Personal life and death ==
Eckman was also considered an expert handicapper on horse racing. In the mid-1970s, he started the $100,000 World Series of Handicapping at the Penn National racetrack in Harrisburg, Pennsylvania. He played an important part in bringing a Minor League Baseball team to Frederick, Maryland (the Frederick Keys).

He was known for his own colorful language and inventive sayings, the most famous of which was "Call a cab" or "Call me a cab"; meaning to be dismissive about someone or something. His hometown Baltimore Sun obituary began "Charley Eckman has called his last cab". He also frequently use the word "yo-yo", meaning "a guy who goes up and down but don't go nowhere".

He resided in Glen Burnie, Maryland for 40 years. His name was typically pronounced "Cholly" in Baltimore. Eckman was appointed by Maryland Governor J. Millard Tawes to serve as Chief Judge of the Anne Arundel County, Maryland Orphans' Court. The Orphans' Court handles wills and estates. In one matter before him, two brothers and a sister were disputing over shares in their father's estate. The brothers had done little to support their father in his later years, and the sister had faithfully attended to him. Eckman awarded the sister the entire estate, and one brother protested he should have received one-third. Eckman responded "All right . . . You will. You get one-third of what she don't want. Case closed".

During his lifetime, he also was a minor league baseball umpire, tax collector, banquet speaker and worked in public relations, among other jobs. He unsuccessfully ran for Maryland's House of Delegates and the Anne Arundel County Council. He had hoped to be named by Governor Tawes head of the Maryland State Racing Commission, but this never occurred. Feeling betrayed by Tawes, he once publicly lambasted the Governor in an elevator at the Lord Baltimore Hotel.

On July 3, 1995, Eckman died of colon cancer, at the age of 73. He was survived by his children, and wife Wilma Norman Eckman, who died in 2018, at the age of 95.

== Head coaching record ==
Legend
| Regular season | G | Games coached | W | Games won | L | Games lost | W–L % | Win–loss % |
| Playoffs | PG | Playoff games | PW | Playoff wins | PL | Playoff losses | PW–L % | Playoff win–loss % |

=== NBA ===
| Team | Year | G | W | L | W–L% | Finish | PG | PW | PL | PW–L% | Result |
|---|---|---|---|---|---|---|---|---|---|---|---|
| Fort Wayne | 1954–55 | 72 | 43 | 29 | .597 | 1st in West | 11 | 6 | 5 | .545 | Lost in NBA Finals |
| Fort Wayne | 1955–56 | 72 | 37 | 35 | .514 | 1st in West | 10 | 4 | 6 | .400 | Lost in NBA Finals |
| Fort Wayne | 1956–57 | 72 | 34 | 38 | .472 | 3rd in East | 2 | 0 | 2 | .000 | Lost in Eastern semifinals |
| Detroit | 1957–58 | 25 | 9 | 16 | .360 | (resigned) | — | — | — | — | — |
| Career | | 241 | 123 | 118 | .510 | | 23 | 10 | 13 | .435 | |
