= Bobby Wanzer =

American basketball player and coach (1921–2016)

Personal information
- Born: June 4, 1921 Brooklyn, New York, U.S.
- Died: January 23, 2016 (aged 94) Pittsford, New York, U.S.
- Listed height: 6 ft 0 in (1.83 m)
- Listed weight: 170 lb (77 kg)

Career information
- High school: Benjamin Franklin (New York City, New York)
- College: Seton Hall (1942–1943); Colgate (1943–1944); Seton Hall (1946–1947)
- BAA draft: 1948: 1st round, 10th overall pick
- Drafted by: Rochester Royals
- Playing career: 1947–1957
- Position: Point guard / shooting guard
- Number: 9
- Coaching career: 1955–1987

Career history

Playing
- 1947–1957: Rochester Royals

Coaching
- 1955–1959: Rochester / Cincinnati Royals
- 1963–1987: St. John Fisher

Career highlights
- As player: NBA champion (1951); 5× NBA All-Star (1952–1956); 3× All-NBA Second Team (1952–1954); No. 8 retired by Seton Hall Pirates; As coach: NBA All-Star Game head coach (1957)

Career BAA and NBA statistics
- Points: 6,924 (12.2 ppg)
- Rebounds: 1,979 (4.5 rpg)
- Assists: 1,830 (3.2 apg)
- Stats at NBA.com
- Stats at Basketball Reference
- Basketball Hall of Fame
- Collegiate Basketball Hall of Fame

Robert Francis Wanzer (June 4, 1921 – January 23, 2016) was an American professional basketball player and coach. A five time NBA All-Star and three time All-NBA Second Team selection, Wanzer played his entire professional career for the Rochester Royals of the Basketball Association of America (BAA) and National Basketball Association (NBA). He won an NBA championship with the Royals in 1951. During his final two years as a player, he served as the team's player-coach. After he retired from playing in 1957, he remained as a coach with the Royals for one season, before he became the head coach of the St. John Fisher Cardinals college basketball team in 1963. He stayed in the role with the college for 24 years until his retirement in 1987. Wanzer was inducted into the Naismith Memorial Basketball Hall of Fame in 1987 and into the newly formed New York City Basketball Hall of Fame in 1991.

== College career and military service ==
A 6'0" guard, Wanzer played collegiately at Seton Hall University. After leading Seton Hall to a 16–2 record as a sophomore, Wanzer enlisted in the United States Marine Corps. He made the All-Pacific Armed Forces All-Star basketball team, and participated in the occupation of Guam. Wanzer played for the Colgate Raiders during the 1943–44 season. He returned to Seton Hall for the 1946–47 season. On November 29, 1947, Wanzer was declared ineligible for the 1947–48 season as he had played varsity for three seasons.

== Professional career ==
Wanzer made his professional debut for the Rochester Royals of the National Basketball League (NBL) during the 1947–48 season. Royals star Bob Davies was a Seton Hall coach and steered the star guard to the NBL contender. Wanzer was selected by the Royals in the 1948 BAA draft. The Royals agreed to waive either their territorial draft pick or their regular draft turn to retain Wanzer.

Initially a reserve behind Al Cervi and Red Holzman, Wanzer later teamed with Davies to form a potent backcourt for the day. The Royals were very successful from 1947 to 1954, and their smaller stars, like Wanzer, were considered their biggest assets. With Wanzer, Rochester won the 1950–51 National Basketball Association (NBA) title.

Wanzer played his entire career with the Royals, retiring from play after the end of the 1957 season. He was a five-time All-Star with the Royals, made the All-NBA Second Team three consecutive times and, in the 1951–52 season, Wanzer became the first player to ever shoot over 90% from the free throw line in a season.

== Coaching career ==
Wanzer served as the player-coach of the Royals for two years, and then, after the franchise moved to Cincinnati, coached for another season. His 1957–58 Cincinnati Royals team were an NBA championship contender, but injuries stopped the team short. When star Maurice Stokes was permanently injured, Wanzer moved on early the following NBA season.

In 1962, Wanzer became the first coach at St. John Fisher College in Pittsford, New York. He coached there for 24 seasons and also served as the school's athletic director. He also served as the schools golf coach for many years before retiring.

== Personal life ==
Wanzer died on January 23, 2016, at his home in Pittsford, New York.

Pre-deceased by his wife, Nina Penrose Wanzer and son-in-law Darrel Dupra he was survived by daughters, Mary and Beth Wanzer and son, Bobby (Nancy) Wanzer; grandchildren Jeff, Zach and Whitney Dupra, Marti and Madison Wanzer; great-granddaughter Seneca Hernandez Dupra; and sister, Marilyn (Robert) Ulrich.

== Legacy ==
He was inducted into the Naismith Memorial Basketball Hall of Fame in 1987. He is also a member of the Seton Hall College Hall of Fame and the New York City Basketball Hall of Fame (1991), among others.

On August 17, 2007, Wanzer was inducted into the United States Marine Corps Sports Hall of Fame.

== BAA/NBA career statistics ==
Legend
GP	Games played	GS	Games started	MPG	Minutes per game
FG%	Field goal percentage	3P%	3-point field goal percentage	FT%	Free throw percentage
RPG	Rebounds per game	APG	Assists per game	SPG	Steals per game
BPG	Blocks per game	PPG	Points per game	**Bold**	Career high
†	Won an NBA championship

=== Regular season ===
Year	Team	GP	MPG	FG%	FT%	RPG	APG	PPG
1948–49	Rochester	60	–	.379	.823	–	3.1	10.2
1949–50	Rochester	67	–	.414	.806	–	3.2	11.8
1950–51†	Rochester	68	–	.401	.850	3.4	2.7	10.8
1951–52	Rochester	66	**37.8**	.425	**.904***	5.0	**4.0**	**15.7**
1952–53	Rochester	70	36.8	.367	.812	5.0	3.6	14.6
1953–54	Rochester	**72**	35.3	.386	.734	**5.4**	3.5	13.3
1954–55	Rochester	**72**	33.0	.395	.786	5.2	3.4	13.1
1955–56	Rochester	**72**	27.5	.376	.719	3.8	3.1	10.4
1956–57	Rochester	21	7.6	**.469**	.783	1.2	0.4	3.9
Career		568	32.5	.393	.802	4.5	3.2	12.2
All-Star		5	26.2	.395	.857	3.4	3.4	9.2

=== Playoffs ===
Year	Team	GP	MPG	FG%	FT%	RPG	APG	PPG
1949	Rochester	4	–	.317	.706	–	2.3	9.5
1950	Rochester	2	–	**.471**	.846	–	2.0	13.5
1951†	Rochester	**14**	–	**.471**	.910	5.1	4.2	12.5
1952	Rochester	6	**41.5**	.429	**.959***	6.3	3.2	**18.8**
1953	Rochester	3	38.7	.378	.852	**7.0**	3.0	17.0
1954	Rochester	6	40.8	.405	.818	5.8	**4.3**	16.0
1955	Rochester	3	33.3	.457	.917	**7.0**	2.7	18.0
Career		38	39.4	.425	.880	5.8	3.5	14.6

== Head coaching record ==
Team	Year	G	W	L	W–L%	Finish	PG	PW	PL	PW–L%	Result
Rochester	1955–56	72	31	41	.431	4th in Western	—	—	—	—	Missed playoffs
Rochester	1956–57	72	31	41	.431	4th in Western	—	—	—	—	Missed playoffs
Cincinnati	1957–58	72	33	39	.530	3rd in Western	2	0	2	.000	Lost Western Division semifinals
Cincinnati	1958–59	16	3	13	.188	—	—	—	—	—	—
Career		234	98	136	.419		2	0	2	.000	
