= Bill Sharman =

American basketball player and coach (1926–2013)

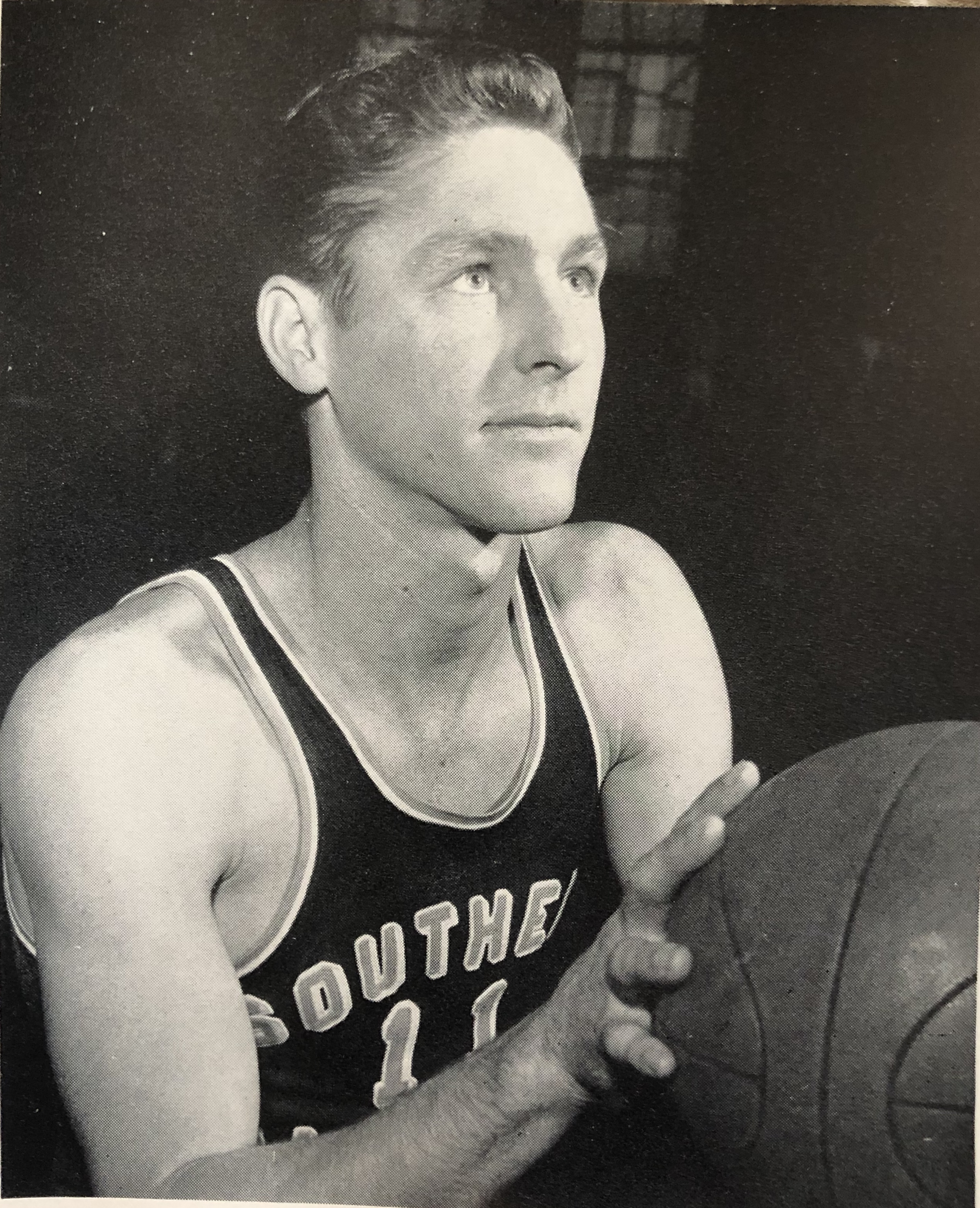
- Sharman with USC, c. 1950

Personal information
- Born: May 25, 1926 Abilene, Texas, U.S.
- Died: October 25, 2013 (aged 87) Redondo Beach, California, U.S.
- Listed height: 6 ft 1 in (1.85 m)
- Listed weight: 175 lb (79 kg)

Career information
- High school: Porterville (Porterville, California)
- College: USC (1946–1950)
- NBA draft: 1950: 2nd round, 17th overall pick
- Drafted by: Washington Capitols
- Playing career: 1950–1962
- Position: Shooting guard
- Number: 10, 21
- Coaching career: 1961–1976

Career history

Playing
- 1950–1951: Washington Capitols
- 1951–1961: Boston Celtics
- 1961–1962: Los Angeles Jets

Career highlights
- As player: 4× NBA champion (1957, 1959–1961); 8× NBA All-Star (1953–1960); NBA All-Star Game MVP (1955); 4× All-NBA First Team (1956–1959); 3× All-NBA Second Team (1953, 1955, 1960); NBA anniversary team (25th, 50th, 75th); No. 21 retired by Boston Celtics; Consensus first-team All-America (1950); 2× First-team All-PCC (1949, 1950); California Mr. Basketball (1944); No. 11 retired by USC Trojans; As coach: NBA champion (1972); ABA champion (1971); ABL champion (1962); NBA Coach of the Year (1972); ABA Coach of the Year (1970); 3× NBA All-Star Game head coach (1968, 1972, 1973); ABA All-Star Game head coach (1971); As executive: 5× NBA champion (1980, 1982, 1985, 1987, 1988)

Career playing statistics
- Points: 12,665 (17.8 ppg)
- Rebounds: 2,779 (3.9 rpg)
- Assists: 2,101 (3.0 apg)
- Stats at NBA.com
- Stats at Basketball Reference

Career coaching record
- NBA & ABA: 466–353 (.569)
- Record at Basketball Reference
- Basketball Hall of Fame (playing)
- Basketball Hall of Fame (coaching)
- Collegiate Basketball Hall of Fame

William Walton Sharman (May 25, 1926 – October 25, 2013), also known as "Battling Bill", was an American professional basketball player and coach. Sharman is a two-time Naismith Memorial Basketball Hall of Fame inductee, having been inducted in 1976 as a player, and in 2004 as a coach. Only John Wooden, Lenny Wilkens, Tommy Heinsohn and Bill Russell share this double honor.

Sharman is mostly known for his time with the Boston Celtics in the 1950s as a player in the National Basketball Association (NBA), partnering with fellow Hall of Fame guard Bob Cousy in what was then considered the greatest backcourt duo of all time. As a coach, Sharman won titles in the American Basketball League (ABL), American Basketball Association (ABA), and NBA, and is credited with introducing the now-ubiquitous morning shootaround. He was named Coach of the Year in both the ABA and NBA.

Sharman was the first North American sports figure to win a championship as a player, coach, and executive. He was a 15-time NBA champion (having won four titles as a player with the Celtics, one as head coach of the Los Angeles Lakers, and ten during his time as a Lakers' general manager, president, and special consultant); and a 17-time champion in professional basketball overall counting his ABL and ABA titles. Sharman coached the 1971–72 Los Angeles Lakers to an NBA record 33-game win streak; a then-record regular season 69–13 win–loss mark; and the first Lakers championship in Los Angeles.

Sharman was an All-American basketball player at the University of Southern California (USC). He played under Naismith Hall of Fame head coach Sam Barry. Sharman was selected twice as the Most Valuable Player in the Pacific Coast Conference. Two of his teammates at USC were future Hall of Fame coaches Alex Hannum and Tex Winter.

== Early life ==
Sharman was born on May 25, 1926, in Abilene, Texas. The family moved to California when he was a child, and he grew up in Lomita, California. He originally attended Narbonne High School where he was on a championship basketball team in ninth grade. As a sophomore, he began attending Porterville High School (PHS), a high school in the Central California city of Porterville, California, after his father obtained a newspaper dealership there. Narbonne's season had ended, and he joined PHS's basketball team and won another championship in the same year. This enabled Sharman to win five high school basketball championships in four years.

He was a 15-letter athlete at PHS, excelling in basketball and baseball, competing in track, and winning the state amateur tennis title. He graduated in 1944, and was named California's Outstanding Athlete. He gave credit to PHS for contributing to his later success in life. Acclaimed sportscaster Keith Jackson said that "'Bill Sharman may have been the best all-around athlete to ever come out of the state of California'".

Sharman served during World War II from 1944 to 1946 in the US Navy.

== College career ==
Sharman was a graduate of the University of Southern California. He started on both the baseball and basketball teams. USC records describe him as playing on the school's baseball team for two years, in 1949 and 1950, and not as a member of the 1948 USC Trojans baseball team.

Sharman played basketball for four years at USC (1946–1950) in the Pacific Coast Conference. He averaged 15.9 points per game as a junior (1948–1949), and 18.6 as a senior (1949–1950). His 13.7 points per game average over his USC career was a then school record. As a senior, he was selected team captain and the team's most valuable player. Sharman, who was known as "Battling Bill", received a standing ovation from USC's fans for the last 1½ minutes of his final college game, played against John Wooden and the UCLA Bruins. Sharman was twice selected All-Pacific Coast Conference (PCC) and twice was named the PCC's Most Valuable Player.

Following his senior year, it is reported that Sharman was a consensus first-team 1950 NCAA Men's Basketball All-American, along with his future Boston Celtic teammate Bob Cousy. It was contemporaneously reported in 1950 that the International News Service and Colliers Magazine named Sharman a first-team All-American, the Associated Press and United Press named him a second-team All-American, and Look magazine named him a third-team All-American. The Sporting News also named him a first-team All-American.

Sharman played forward for USC under Hall of Fame head coach Sam Barry. In addition to Sharman, Barry coached two other future Hall of Fame coaches at USC, Tex Winter and Alex Hannum. Sharman was Hannum's teammate from 1946 to 1948 at USC. They both played with Winter during the 1946–47 USC season.

== Professional baseball career ==
In 1950, the Brooklyn Dodgers baseball organization offered Sharman a contract with a $12,000 signing bonus, at a time when professional baseball was more prestigious than professional basketball. However, Sharman knew he had been taken by the Washington Capitols in the NBA draft, so he got the Dodgers to agree that he not be prevented from playing professional basketball.

=== Minor leagues ===
From 1950 to 1955, Sharman played professional baseball in the Brooklyn Dodgers minor league system. He played for the Pueblo Dodgers, Elmira Pioneers, Fort Worth Cats, St. Paul Saints, and the Mobile Bears. He had a lifetime .281 batting average in 638 games. He was called up to the Dodgers late in the 1951 season but did not appear in a game. He was part of a September 27 game in which the entire Brooklyn bench was cleared from the dugout for arguing with the home plate umpire over a ruling at the plate. This has led to the legend that Sharman holds the distinction of being the only player in baseball history to have ever been ejected from a major league game without ever appearing in one. However, although Sharman was among the Dodger bench players that had to go to the clubhouse, none of them were actually barred from playing in the game. In fact, in the top of the ninth, one of the other dismissed players, Wayne Terwilliger, was used as a pinch-hitter in the game.

Sharman continued to play baseball until breaking his basketball shooting hand while sliding into home plate, after which he decided to focus solely on basketball.

== Professional basketball career ==
During the same time period he was playing professional baseball, Sharman also played professional basketball for two different teams.

=== Washington Capitols (1950–51) ===
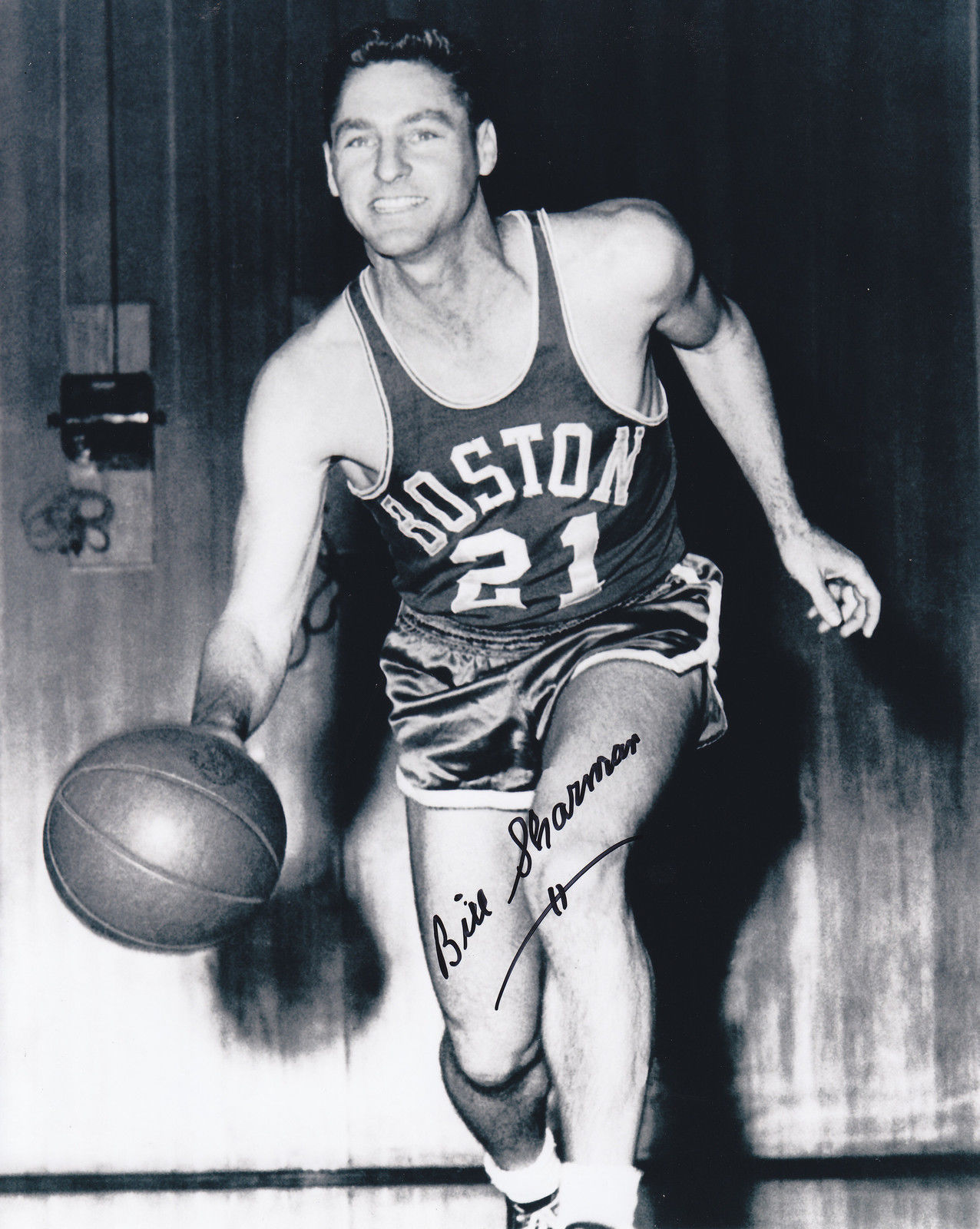
Sharman c. 1960

Sharman was drafted by the Washington Capitols in the second round of the 1950 NBA draft. His future Celtics teammate Bob Cousy was taken in the first round of the same draft. The team offered Sharman $5,000, the most ever paid to a rookie. After refusing the initial offer, and telling the Capitols he wanted to play baseball, the team increased the offer to $8,000 and Sharman joined the Capitols. The team failed financially 35 games into the 1950–51 season. Before the team folded, Sharman played in 31 games, averaging 12.2 points and 3.5 rebounds per game with an .889 free thrown percentage.

Earl Lloyd, the African American player who broke the NBA's color barrier was a Capitols' teammate. Lloyd did not have a car, and Sharman would drive over to Lloyd's home in segregated Washington, D.C. to pick Lloyd up, so Lloyd would not have to take long bus rides. Lloyd said of Sharman, "'Bill was a decent guy when it wasn't fashionable...."

=== Boston Celtics (1951 to 1961) ===
Following the disbanding of the Capitols, Sharman was selected by the Fort Wayne Pistons in the NBA's dispersal draft. Sharman wound up as part of a transaction or series of transactions in 1951 that sent Chuck Share to the Pistons, with Sharman, Bob Brannum, and Bob Harris going from the Pistons to the Boston Celtics. The Celtics had drafted Share in the 1950 NBA draft. It was reported at the time that after the Celtics rejected Share's relatively exorbitant contract demands, Share signed with the Waterloo Hawks of the National Professional Basketball League in May 1950. After that, the reporting varies considerably as to the specific nature of the transactions (as to it being a trade involving cash and players; a series of cash transactions; whether the Celtics or Pistons paid Waterloo). All of the reporting does agree that the Celtics obtaining Sharman, Brannum, and Harris turned out heavily lopsided in Boston's favor; with Celtics' owner Walter A. Brown later saying that receiving any one of the three Pistons' players alone for Share would have been a favorable deal for the Celtics.

Sharman played a total of ten seasons for the Celtics. He led the team in scoring for consecutive seasons (1955 to 1959), averaging over 20 points per game during three of those seasons. The Celtics were in the playoffs every season Sharman was with the team (1951 to 1961). Sharman won four NBA championships with the Celtics. He was still referred to as "Battling Bill" Sharman with the Celtics.

Sharman was one of the first NBA guards to shoot better than .400 from the field, with a .450 percentage in 1953–54. He led the NBA in free throw percentage a record seven times (including a record five consecutive seasons), and his mark of 93.2% in the 1958–59 season remained the NBA record until Ernie DiGregorio topped it in 1976–77 (94.5%). Sharman's career free throw percentage was .883, 15th all-time in NBA history (through 2025–26). Sharman still holds the record for consecutive free throws in the playoffs with 56.

Sharman was named to the All-NBA First Team four consecutive seasons (1955 through 1959), and was an All-NBA Second Team member in 1952–53, 1954–55, and 1959–60. Sharman played in eight NBA All-Star games, scoring in double figures in seven of them. He was named the 1955 NBA All-Star Game MVP after scoring ten of his fifteen points in the fourth quarter. Sharman still holds the NBA All-Star Game record for field goals attempted in a quarter with 12.

The pairing of Sharman and fellow Hall of Fame Celtics guard Bob Cousy, combining a pure shooter with a playmaker, formed the first modern backcourt. In one NBA ranking of the greatest backcourt duos in league history, Sharman and Cousy were ranked ninth out of seventy pairs.

At the end of the 1960–61 NBA season, Sharman ended his NBA playing career after 11 seasons. During his 10-year Celtics career, Sharman played in 680 regular season averaging 32 minutes and 18.1 points per game, with an .883 free throw percentage. In 78 playoff games with the Celtics, Sharman averaged 33 minutes and 18.5 points per game, with a .911 free throw percentage.

== Coaching career ==
=== Los Angeles Jets and Cleveland Pipers (1961–62) ===
Sharman's two-year contract with the Celtics ended in 1961, and he became the general manager and coach for the Los Angeles Jets of the American Basketball League (ABL) in the 1961–62 season. He also intended to play for the Jets. In late October 1961, the Celtics threatened to sue Sharman if he played for the Jets, based on the option clause in his NBA contract with the Celtics. Sharman responded that the Celtics' contract was inapplicable because he was the Jets' coach; and further stated that the Celtics had failed to pay him $3,400 due as his 1961 playoff share, in violation of the Celtics' contractual obligations.

Sharman appeared in 19 games as a player for the Jets, but the franchise folded operations in late January 1962 during that league's only full season of play. Celtics' owner Walter A. Brown had been withholding Sharman's 1961 playoff money at the instruction of NBA president Maurice Podoloff, but paid around $3,000 to Sharman after the Jets folded. Sharman remained in the ABL when he was hired to coach the Cleveland Pipers during the second half of the season by Pipers' team owner and president George Steinbrenner. The Pipers went on to win the ABL's only full-season championship title. Sharman had a 24–15 record with the Jets and 24–18 record with the Pipers during the ABL's 1961–62 season. The ABL folded altogether on December 31, 1962, before completing its second season. Sharman had left the ABL before the start of its second season.

After the Los Angeles Jets dissolved in 1962, Sharman brought a lawsuit to enforce his employment contract with the Jets, culminating in the case Sharman v. Longo (1967) 249 Cal.App.2d 948.

=== Los Angeles State College ===
In July 1962, Sharman was hired as head coach and athletic director at Los Angeles State College (now California State, Los Angeles). The team had a losing record in its two previous seasons before hiring Sharman. He coached there for two seasons (1962 to 1964). The team went 27–20 during that time. Sharman resigned from Los Angeles State in August 1964, and shortly after that took a job as a radio and television color commentator for the St. Louis Hawks. He worked for the Hawks one year; and then worked as an oil company representative the following year.

=== San Francisco Warriors (1966 to 1968) ===
In March 1966, Sharman was hired as head coach of the NBA's San Francisco Warriors. Sharman replaced his former USC teammate Alex Hannum as the Warriors' head coach. In their first season under Sharman, the Warriors were 44–37 and finished in first place in the NBA's Western Division. They won the 1967 Western Division playoff semifinals and finals, and made it to the 1967 NBA Finals. The Warriors lost that series in six games to the Philadelphia 76ers, who were coached by Hannum.

In his second and final season with the Warriors (1967–68), the team finished third in the Western Division, and lost in the 1968 Western Division finals to the Lakers. Sharman resigned as the Warriors coach after the end of the season, on April 26, stating he wanted to be more than a coach with the Warriors. Three days later he joined the Los Angeles Stars of the rival American Basketball Association as head coach.

=== Los Angeles / Utah Stars (1968–1971) ===
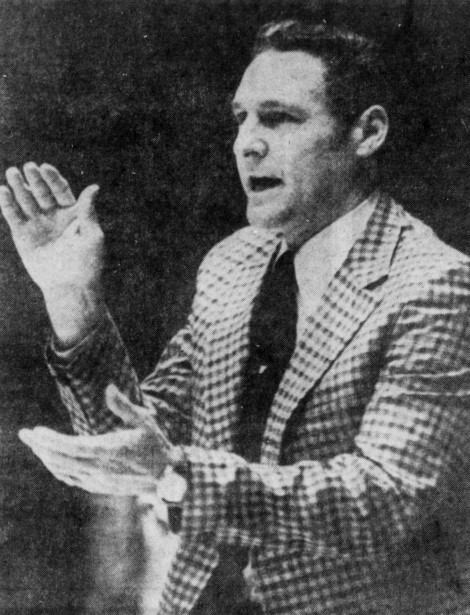
Sharman as a coach in 1971

Sharman became the Stars' coach for the 1968–69 season. The Stars had offered him a long term contract with an increase in salary and an opportunity to purchase an ownership interest in the team. He was a co-recipient of the ABA Coach of the Year honors in 1969–70, with Joe Belmont of the Denver Rockets. The Stars moved to Utah for the 1970–71 season, when Sharman coached the Utah Stars to an ABA title. The championship team's star player was the 1971 ABA playoff MVP and future Hall of Fame center Zelmo Beaty. The Stars defeated the Kentucky Colonels, and their future hall of fame center Dan Issel, four games to three for the ABA championship.

In late May/early June 1971, the Los Angeles Lakers offered Sharman their head coaching job, and Sharman informed the Stars he was leaving. Sharman said that his lawyers advised Sharman that his contract with the Stars might not be valid because after the Stars moved to Utah he was told the terms giving him a potential ownership right and receiving a pension plan might not be honored. The Stars filed a $5 million lawsuit against Sharman, and obtained a temporary restraining order that Sharman could only coach the Stars.

The court held a hearing a week later, dismissed the temporary restraining order, and ruled that the Stars could not enjoin Sharman from coaching another team. The Stars maintained that they would still pursue legal action if he joined the Lakers. After Sharman took the Lakers' head coaching job, in 1971 Stars' owner Bill Daniels did pursue breach of contract litigation against Sharman personally, and a tort claim against the Lakers' ownership for inducing Sharman's alleged breach of contract, in a Utah federal district court. In early 1975, the federal district court judge ruled that Sharman had breached his contract. Sharman gave his personal opinion at the time, "'I've seen some home court decisions in basketball but the court's decision is a gross miscarriage of justice'". The matter then went to the jury which found that Sharman personally had to pay Daniels $250,000 in damages, and that the Lakers had induced Sharman's breach and had to pay Daniels $175,000. Sharman and the Lakers appealed, and in February 1977 the United States Court of Appeals for the Tenth Circuit reversed the $425,000 in judgments against them.

=== Los Angeles Lakers (1971 to 1976) ===
As the Lakers' coach in the 1971–72 season, Sharman guided the Wilt Chamberlain and Jerry West-led Los Angeles Lakers to an NBA record 33 game win streak, a then-record 69–13 win–loss mark, the first Lakers championship in Los Angeles, and the first for the Lakers' franchise in more than a decade. The Lakers had a 12–3 record in the 1972 NBA playoffs, defeating the New York Knicks in the 1972 NBA Finals in five games. The Lakers had been to the NBA finals seven times since moving from Minneapolis, losing each time. That season, Sharman was named NBA Coach of the Year.

The Lakers were 60–22 the following season and reached 1973 NBA Finals, playing the Knicks for a second consecutive season. The Lakers lost to the Knicks in five games. Chamberlain retired before the 1973–74 season, and West only played in 31 games that season because of injury. The Lakers' record fell to 47–35, and they were eliminated in the first round of the 1974 NBA playoffs. West retired before the 1974–75 season, in which the Lakers went 30–52. The Lakers traded for Kareem Abdul-Jabbar before the 1975–76 season. Abdul-Jabbar was the NBA's Most Valuable Player that season, but the team was 40–42 and did not make the playoffs.

This was Sharman's last season as the Lakers' coach. In five years as the Lakers' coach he had a 246–164 (.600) regular season record, and a 22–15 (.595) playoff record. In the 1971–72 season, Sharman had suffered a vocal cord injury while coaching that did not fully heal and got progressively worse over time. His voice degenerated to the degree he was no longer able to function as a coach by the end of the 1975–76 season. He was replaced by Jerry West as the Lakers' head coach.

Sharman is one of two men to win NBA and ABA championships as a coach. His USC teammate Alex Hannum was the other coach to do so, coincidentally also winning an NBA championship coaching a Chamberlain-led team (the 1966-67 Philadelphia 76ers) that defeated the Sharman-coached San Francisco Warriors. Including his ABL championship with the Pipers, Sharman is the only coach to win championships in three different professional basketball leagues.

As a coach, Sharman invented the morning shootaround as a way to burn off nervous energy on game days. He took the shootaround with him to his first coaching jobs in the ABL, the ABA, and later the NBA. After the Lakers won the NBA championship in 1972, every other team in the league added the shootaround to its game-day regimen.

== Executive career ==
In late August 1976, after replacing Sharman as head coach with Jerry West, Lakers' owner Jack Kent Cooke originally made Sharman the Lakers assistant general manager; under general manager Pete Newell. Newell resigned a few weeks later, and Cooke made Sharman general manager. As the Lakers general manager Sharman built the 1980 and 1982 NBA championship teams, known as the "Showtime Lakers".

Sharman's draft picks as the Lakers' general manager included, among others, future Hall of Fame players Michael Cooper (1978, No. 60 overall), Magic Johnson (1979, No. 1 overall), and James Worthy (1982, No. 1 overall); as well as all-star guard Norm Nixon (1977, No. 22 overall). Sharman signed future Hall of Fame forward Jamal Wilkes in July 1977, after Wilkes played out his option with the Golden State Warriors. In early 1980, Sharman had traded Don Ford and the Lakers 1980 No. 1 draft pick (No. 22 overall used to draft Chad Kinch) to the Cleveland Cavaliers for Butch Lee and the Cavaliers No. 1 draft pick in 1982, which was used to draft Worthy.

Sharman was still subject to problems with his voice that limited his functioning as general manager. In 1982, new Lakers' owner Jerry Buss made Sharman the Lakers' president, and West the Lakers' new general manager. As team president, Sharman oversaw the Lakers' 1985, 1987, and 1988 NBA championship teams. In 1988, Sharman spent a year in total silence. He had a medical procedure that involved crushing a vocal cord that left his voice permanently strained, making it an effort for him to speak. Sharman retired from the Lakers' front office in 1991 at age 65. He remained with Lakers as a special consultant after retiring as president; and his voice improved over time. The Lakers won five more NBA championships during Sharman's tenure as a consultant. His former USC teammate Tex Winter played an integral role in four of those Lakers' championships as an assistant coach and consultant.

== Legacy and honors ==
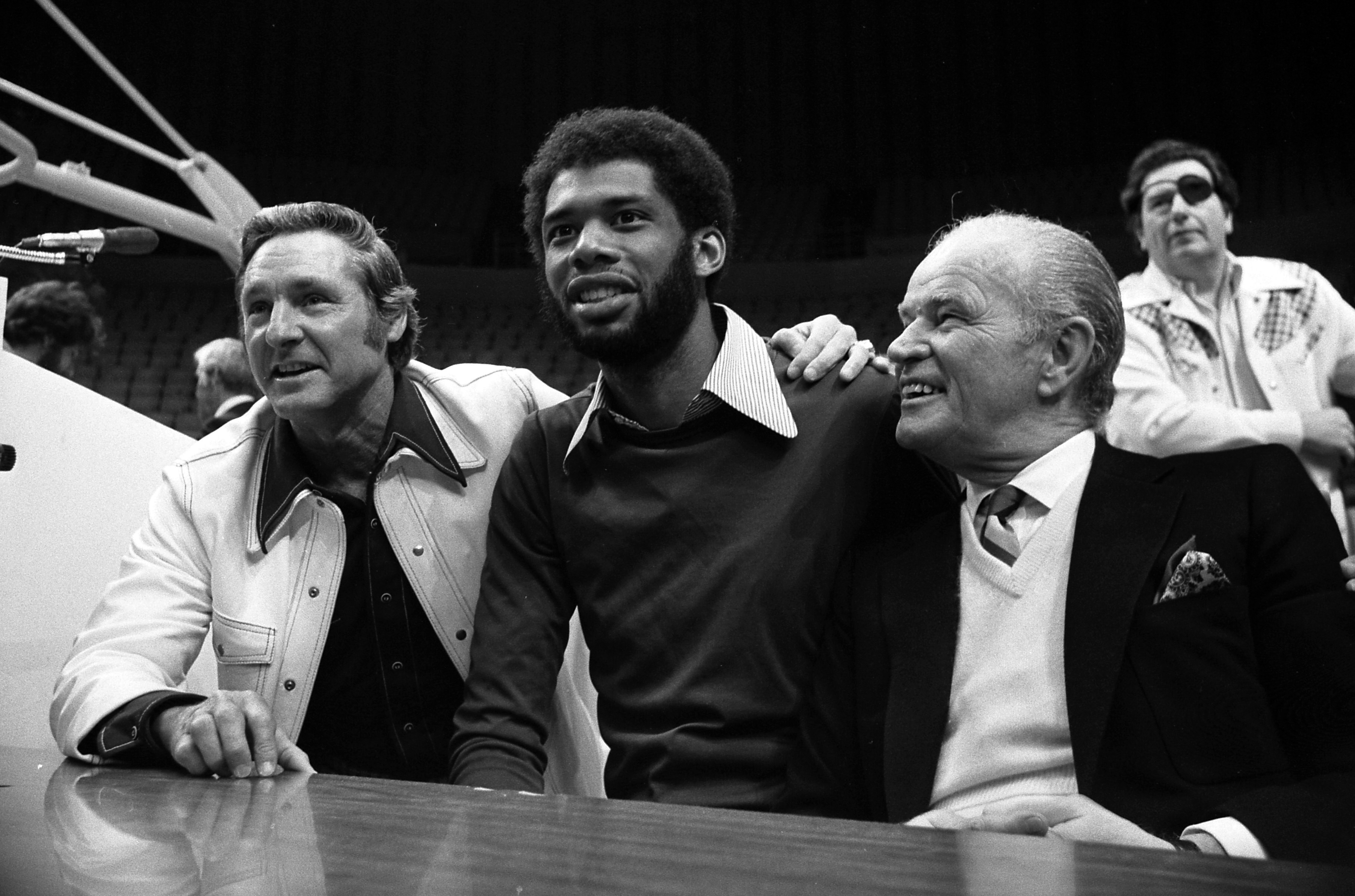
L-R: Sharman, Kareem Abdul-Jabbar and Jack Kent Cooke at press conference announcing Lakers' signing Kareem in Los Angeles, 1975

Sharman was enshrined in the Naismith Basketball Hall of Fame in 1976 as a player and again in 2004 as a coach. He is one of only five people to be enshrined in both categories, the others being John Wooden, Lenny Wilkens, and his former teammates Tom Heinsohn and Bill Russell. He was introduced at his 2004 Hall of Fame ceremony by Wooden, Bob Cousy, and Jerry West. In 1994, he was the first basketball player inducted into the USC Athletics Hall of Fame.

Sharman was a 15-time NBA champion (having won four titles as a player with the Celtics, one as head coach of the Los Angeles Lakers, and ten as a Lakers' executive and special consultant), and a 17-time champion in basketball overall counting his ABL and ABA titles.

In 1971, Sharman was named to the NBA 25th Anniversary Team. On October 29, 1996, Sharman was named one of the NBA's 50 Greatest Players. In October 2021, Sharman was again honored as one of the league's greatest players of all time by being named to the NBA 75th Anniversary Team.

Sharman died one day before his induction into the inaugural class of the Porterville High School Athletic Hall of Fame. The gymnasium at Porterville High School is named after Sharman.

In 2013, Sharman sold his 2010 NBA championship ring from the Lakers to benefit charity.

== Personal life and death ==
Sharman's marriage to his first wife, Illeana, lasted over 20 years and resulted in four children before their divorce in 1968. He was married to his second wife, Dorothy, from 1969 until her death from cancer in 1975. Sharman married Joyce McLay in 1981, with whom he remained married until his death.

Sharman was the author/co-author of two books, Sharman on Basketball Shooting, published by Prentice Hall in 1966; and The Wooden-Sharman Method: A Guide to Winning Basketball with John Wooden and Bob Selzer, published in 1975. He was a stand-in for the Tarzan character in a number of movies, and was a double for the actor Stewart Granger in the movie Green Fire (co-starring Grace Kelly). Sharman agreed to participate in a scene where Granger's character was being stalked by a tiger, only after being offered more money to play the scene that used an actual tiger. He recalled being in 40 to 50 movies, principally as an extra or in the background.

Sharman died at his home in Redondo Beach, California, on October 25, 2013, at the age of 87, after having had a stroke the week prior.

== NBA career statistics ==
Legend
GP	Games played	GS	Games started	MPG	Minutes per game
FG%	Field goal percentage	3P%	3-point field goal percentage	FT%	Free throw percentage
RPG	Rebounds per game	APG	Assists per game	SPG	Steals per game
BPG	Blocks per game	PPG	Points per game	**Bold**	Career high
†	Won an NBA championship	*	Led the league

=== Regular season ===
Year	Team	GP	MPG	FG%	FT%	RPG	APG	PPG
1950–51	Washington	31	—	.370	.889	3.5	1.3	12.2
1951–52	Boston	63	22.0	.389	.859	3.5	2.4	10.7
1952–53	Boston	71	32.9	.436	.850*	4.1	2.7	16.2
1953–54	Boston	**72**	34.3	.450	.844*	3.5	3.2	16.0
1954–55	Boston	68	36.1	.427	.897*	4.4	4.1	18.4
1955–56	Boston	**72**	**37.5**	.438	.867*	3.6	**4.7**	19.9
1956–57†	Boston	67	35.9	.416	.905*	4.3	3.5	21.1
1957–58	Boston	63	35.1	.424	.893	**4.7**	2.7	**22.3**
1958–59†	Boston	**72**	33.1	.408	**.932***	4.1	2.5	20.4
1959–60†	Boston	71	27.0	**.456**	.866	3.7	2.0	19.3
1960–61†	Boston	61	25.2	.422	.921*	3.7	2.4	16.0
Career		711	32.0	.426	.883	3.9	3.0	17.8
All-Star		8	24.3	.385	.815	3.9	2.0	12.8

=== Playoffs ===
Year	Team	GP	MPG	FG%	FT%	RPG	APG	PPG
1952	Boston	1	27.0	**.583**	**1.000**	3.0	**7.0**	15.0
1953	Boston	6	33.5	.333	.938	2.5	2.5	11.7
1954	Boston	6	34.3	.432	.860	4.2	1.7	18.8
1955	Boston	7	**41.4**	.500	.921	5.4	5.4	20.7
1956	Boston	3	39.7	.391	.941	2.3	4.0	17.3
1957†	Boston	10	37.7	.381	.953	3.5	2.9	**21.1**
1958	Boston	11	36.9	.407	.929	**4.9**	2.3	**21.1**
1959†	Boston	11	29.3	.425	.966	3.3	2.5	20.1
1960†	Boston	**13**	28.0	.421	.811	3.5	1.5	16.8
1961†	Boston	10	26.1	.511	.889	2.7	1.7	16.8
Career		78	33.0	.426	.911	3.7	2.6	18.5

== Head coaching record ==
Legend
Regular season	G	Games coached	W	Games won	L	Games lost	W–L %	Win–loss %
Playoffs	PG	Playoff games	PW	Playoff wins	PL	Playoff losses	PW–L %	Playoff win–loss %

Team	Year	G	W	L	W–L%	Finish	PG	PW	PL	PW–L%	Result
San Francisco	1966–67	81	44	37	.543	1st in Western	15	9	6	.600	Lost in NBA Finals
San Francisco	1967–68	82	43	39	.524	3rd in Western	10	4	6	.400	Lost in Div. Finals
Los Angeles (ABA)	1968–69	78	33	45	.423	5th in Western	-	-	-	–	Missed Playoffs
Los Angeles (ABA)	1969–70	84	43	41	.512	4th in Western	17	10	7	.588	Lost in ABA Finals
Utah (ABA)	1970–71	84	57	27	.679	2nd in Western	18	12	6	.667	Won ABA Championship
Los Angeles	1971–72	82	69	13	.841	1st in Pacific	15	12	3	.800	Won NBA Championship
Los Angeles	1972–73	82	60	22	.732	1st in Pacific	17	9	8	.529	Lost in NBA Finals
Los Angeles	1973–74	82	47	35	.573	1st in Pacific	5	1	4	.200	Lost in Conf. Semifinals
Los Angeles	1974–75	82	30	52	.366	5th in Pacific	-	-	-	–	Missed Playoffs
Los Angeles	1975–76	82	40	42	.488	4th in Pacific	-	-	-	–	Missed Playoffs
Career		819	466	353	.569		97	57	40	.588	

== See also ==
- List of National Basketball Association career free throw percentage leaders

Preceded by Initial coach	Utah Stars head coach 1968–1971	Succeeded by LaDell Andersen
