= Simon Gourdine =

American sports executive (1940–2012

Executive Director of the National Basketball Players Association
- In office 1995–1996
- Preceded by: Charles Grantham
- Succeeded by: Billy Hunter; Alex English (interim)

New York City Commissioner of Consumer Affairs
- In office 1982–1984
- Appointed by: Ed Koch
- Preceded by: Bruce Ratner
- Succeeded by: Angelo Aponte

Deputy Commissioner of the National Basketball Association
- In office 1974–1982
- Preceded by: Position created
- Succeeded by: Russ Granik

Personal details
- Born: Simon Peter Gourdine; July 30, 1940 Jersey City, New Jersey, U.S.
- Died: August 16, 2012 (aged 72) Englewood, New Jersey, U.S.
- Education: City College of New York; Fordham University School of Law

Simon Peter Gourdine (July 30, 1940 – August 16, 2012) was an American sports executive who was the deputy commissioner of the National Basketball Association from 1974 to 1982 and executive director of the National Basketball Players Association from 1995 to 1996.

== Early life ==
Gourdine was born on July 30, 1940, in Jersey City, New Jersey. His family moved to New York City when he was four. He graduated from the High School of Commerce and attended the City College of New York, where he majored in political science and headed the school's NAACP chapter. He graduated from CCNY in 1962 and earned his juris doctor from the Fordham University School of Law in 1965.

Gourdine entered the United States Army in 1965. He served with the 4th Transportation Command during the Vietnam War as a member of the inspector general's staff. He separated in September 1967 with the rank of captain.

After leaving the Army, Gourdine worked as an assistant United States attorney in New York City. He then served as general counsel of the Urban Coalition Venture Corporation before joining the legal department of Celanese.

== National Basketball Association ==
In 1970, Gourdine became an administrative assistant to NBA commissioner J. Walter Kennedy. His duties included providing legal counsel, serving as liaison to the National Basketball Players Association, and heading the league's security program. In 1972, he was promoted to vice president of administration. In 1974, he was unanimously elected deputy commissioner by the league's owners, making him the highest-ranking black executive in American sports.

Gourdine was seen as a leading candidate to succeed Kennedy when he retired in 1975, with sportswriter Sam Lacy stating that it "appear[ed] a foregone conclusion that Gordine will take over the top post when it becomes vacant". Kennedy himself stated that he would be "very comfotable if Simon succeeded me" because "he knows the intricacies of the administration, he knows the idiosyncrasies of some of the owners, he has a good relationship with the individual teams [and] the front offices, he's been a liaison with the players' association for four years, and he's a lawyer". However, Kennedy also noted that Gourdine, 34, was seen as too young for the job by some of the owners. John Wilcox, a member of the committee screening candidates for commissioner, indicated that Gourdine had little chance of getting the job because he felt that it would be in the best interest of the league to hire an outside candidate with a "strong national background...who has a substantial history of decision marking". Former Democratic National Committee chairman Larry O'Brien was selected for the position. Gourdine, while disappointed over being passed over, felt that O'Brien was "an extremely talented and well-known personality who could be helpful to the NBA in its relationship to the legislative bodies" and was optimistic that he would get the job next time it was open.

Gourdine continued to serve as deputy commissioner under O'Brien. Together, they settled the Oscar Robinson suit, oversaw the ABA–NBA merger, and negotiated the 1976 NBA collective bargaining agreement. Gourdine also reached a settlement with the National Basketball Referees Association that prevented a walkout during the 1977 NBA playoffs and worked on the agreement that allowed the Nets to move from Long Island to New Jersey. In 1979, he completed a 14-week program for managerial development at Harvard Business School. In June 1981, with O'Brien well entrenched as commissioner and no readily available opportunity for advancement in the NBA, Gourdine announced that he would resign when his contract expired in January 1982.

== Government service ==
On December 22, 1981, Gourdine was named New York City's commissioner of consumer affairs by mayor Ed Koch. He succeeded Bruce Ratner, who returned to business. At the time of his appointment, he was one of three black commissioners (along with Parks Commissioner Gordon Davis and corrections commissioner Benjamin Ward) in Koch administration. Gourdine advised the mayor on minority affairs and oversaw the unsuccessful effort to get the Baltimore Colts to relocate to the city after the New York Jets announced they would leave Shea Stadium for Giants Stadium. He resigned in March 1984 to become the general counsel and secretary of the Rockefeller Foundation. He returned to government service in 1986 as the director of labor relations for the Metropolitan Transportation Authority.

In 1989, Gourdine was a leading candidate to become president of the National League. The league's owners wanted to hire a black candidate, but passed on Gourdine due to his lack of baseball experience and instead selected Bill White.

== Media ==
Gourdine was the general partner of Riverdale Media Corp, which, in partnership with ML Media Oppotunity Fund (headed by Martin Pompadur and Elton Rule), purchased three television stations (WRBL in Columbus, Georgia, WTWO in Terre Haute, Indiana, and KQTV in St. Joseph, Missouri) from Malcolm Glazer for $60 million in 1990. Gourdine exited his stake in these stations by 1995.

== National Basketball Players Association ==
In 1990, Gourdine was named general counsel of the National Basketball Players Association. He became the union's executive director when Charles Grantham resigned in 1995. He was the NBPA's lead negotiator during the 1995 NBA lockout. The two sides agreed on a six-year collective bargaining agreement in September before any games were canceled. The union gave Gourdine a two-year contract in December 1995, but the following month, the executive board voted 18 to 2 in favor of firing him. In 1997, he was awarded $833,638 plus interest in unpaid salary by a panel of arbitrators.

== Return to government service ==
In 2002, New York City Police Commissioner Raymond Kelly appointed Gourdine to the position of deputy commissioner for trials. He, along with four assistant trial commissioners, oversaw the department's disciplinary hearings and recommended disciplinary actions to the commissioner. He retired in January 2006, but returned to the city government later that year when he was appointed chairman of the New York City Civil Service Commission by Mayor Michael Bloomberg. He held this position until 2008.

== Death ==
Gourdine died August 16, 2012, at Englewood Hospital and Medical Center in Englewood, New Jersey shortly after back surgery.
