= NBA fines =

Penalties for misconduct

The Commissioner of the National Basketball Association (NBA) oversees all the fines handed out to NBA players and organizations for misconduct.

== Commissioner's role ==
In accordance with the constitution and by-laws of the NBA, the commissioner Adam Silver is responsible for overseeing fines handed out to players, owners, officers, managers, and coaches for acting in any way that is perceived to be “prejudicial to or against the best interests of the Association or the game of basketball”. There are no official rules dictating which specific actions deserve imposition of these fines, but if it is “in the opinion” of the commissioner that players have inappropriately conducted themselves, then the commissioner is legally obligated to hand out fines and/or give suspensions.

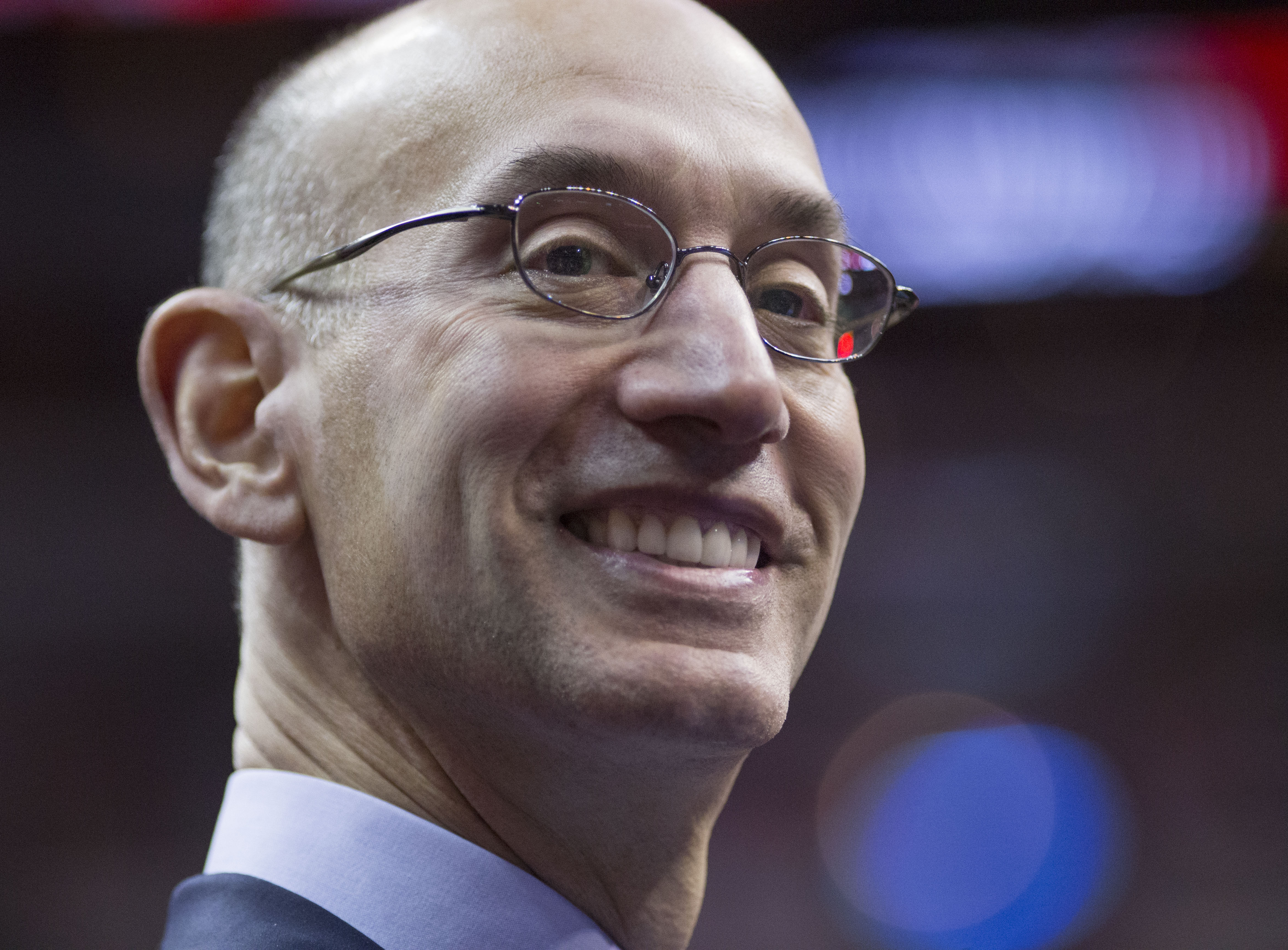
Current NBA commissioner Adam Silver

== Types of fines ==
Fines in the NBA can be incurred for various reason and by various people. Players, teams, coaches, and owners can all incur fines. From 2003 to 2013 the top 5 most fined offenses were for criticizing referees (81 times, for about $2.1 million), fan confrontation (42 times, for $672,500), interaction with referees (35 times, for $750,000), fighting (26 times, for about $1.5 million), and flagrant fouls (22 times, for $295,000). Down further on the list are fines for media, flopping, social media, uniform violations (under NBA Dress Code) and drugs. In all during this 10-year period the league gave a total of 341 fines for a total of $11,488,000. This total only includes fines that were made public and do not include any technical foul fines incurred during the course of a game.

== Notable fines ==
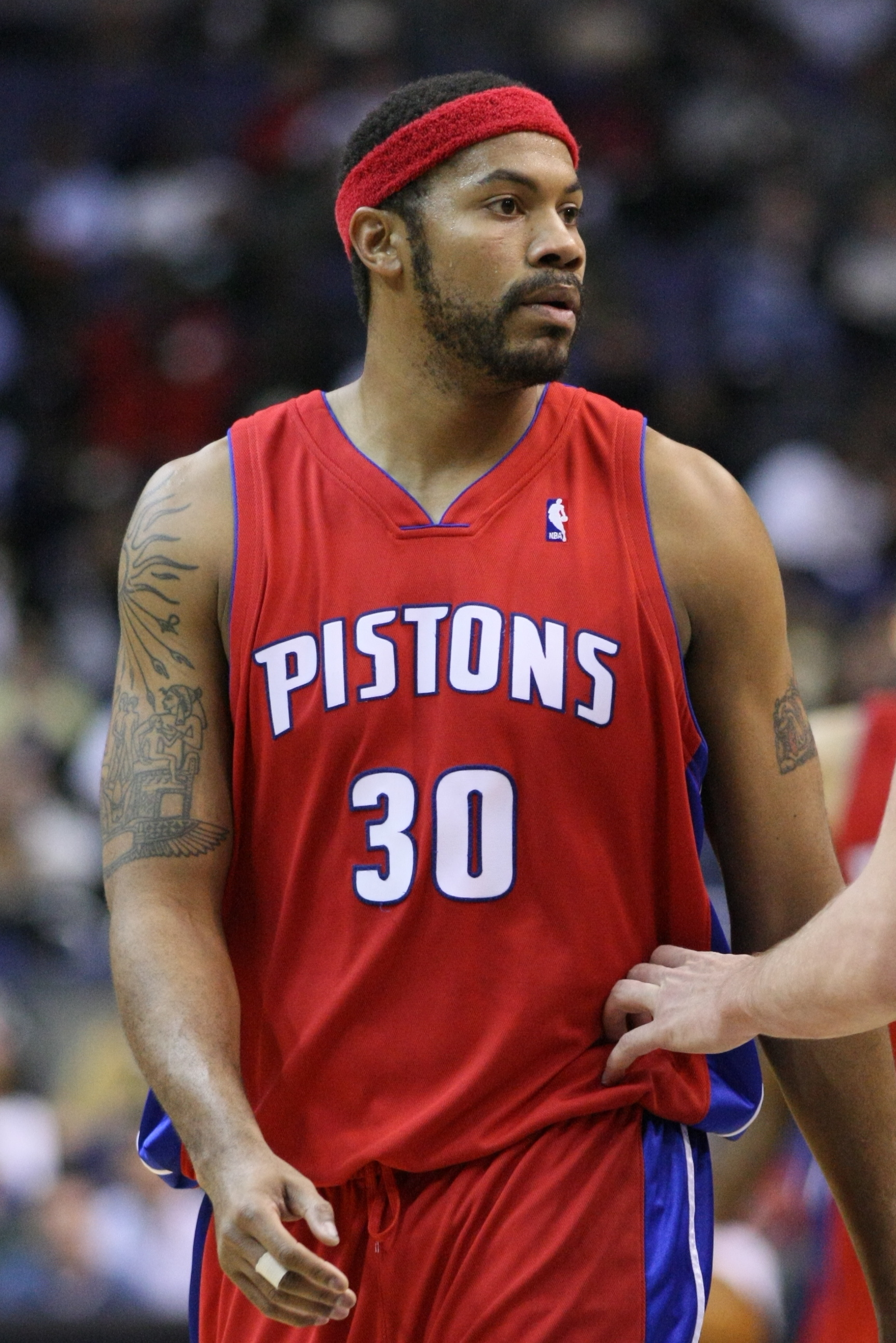
Rasheed Wallace

The most fined player for the number of fines is Rasheed Wallace, who has been fined 8 times for a total of $205,000. Ben Simmons is the most fined player for the total amount of money, having lost more than $19 million in fines for missing games after holding out on the Philadelphia 76ers during the 2021–22 season. Vladimir Radmanovic was fined $500,000 in 2007, one of the largest fines by levied by an NBA team on a player. He was fined after injuring his shoulder while snowboarding, violating his contract for participating in an activity that posed a significant risk.

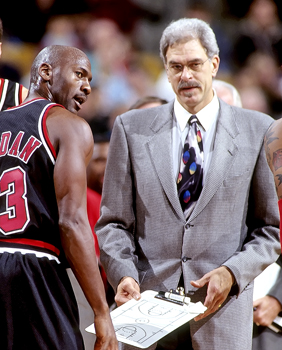
Phil Jackson coaching Michael Jordan

The most fined coach, for both the number of fines and total amount fined, is Phil Jackson for a total of $380,000 and a total of 8 fines. Coaches are most often fined for criticizing the refs. Jackson, Larry Brown, and Doc Rivers are the top 3 most fined coaches, Brown with 7 fines totaling $117,500 and Rivers with 6 fines totaling $115,000. These 3 coaches together account for 23 of the 54 fines given to coaches.

The two teams that have been fined the most are the New York Knicks and the Denver Nuggets; both teams were fined on 2 separate occasions for a total of $700,000. The Knicks and Nuggets both received fines for $500,000 for the fight they were in at Madison Square Garden in 2006. The Los Angeles Lakers are the team with the most total number of fines with 6, totaling $725,000. The largest team fine in NBA history occurred in 2000, to the Minnesota Timberwolves for $3.5 million. They were caught trying to secretly go over the salary cap for the year. This is also the largest fine amount that has ever been issued in the League.

The most fined owner is Mark Cuban, for 20 fines totaling $2,240,000; this single-handedly accounts for about 10% of all fines since 2000. Cuban is not only the most fined owner, he is the most fined individual in NBA history, in terms of total number of fines. His largest fine to date, for $600,000, came after a remark that the Dallas Mavericks should tank for the rest of the 2017–18 season. Cuban has said that every time he gets fined, he matches that amount and donates it to a charity of his choice.

== Impact ==
As one of the world's highest-paid group of athletes, an NBA player's average salary is $4,001,760, and some contracts are worth over $10 million. In 2015–2016 season, 246 players were fined an amount totaling $5,463,829, giving an average per player of $22,210 The impact to NBA players is approximately $150 to a person who makes $30,000 annually.

The NBA says that it allocates fine money to charity, although it is the only professional sports organization that does not publicize what specific charities receive donations. The NFL has contributed a large sum to retired players with health problems, and to charities. The MLB has had several instances where they have let players choose their own charity. The program NBA Cares is in charge of choosing what charities the NBA will support; some of these include UNICEF, Habitat for Humanity, Boys and Girls Club of America, and Feed the Children.

The fine money of NBA players isn't donated to charities directly, according to NBA collective bargaining agreement, The NBA and National Basketball Players Association (NBPA) first equally split fines that collected from players, with half the fine going to the Players' Association and the league retaining the other half. Each then donates its portion to a group of charities of its choice.
