= Commissioner of the NBA =

Chief executive of the National Basketball Association

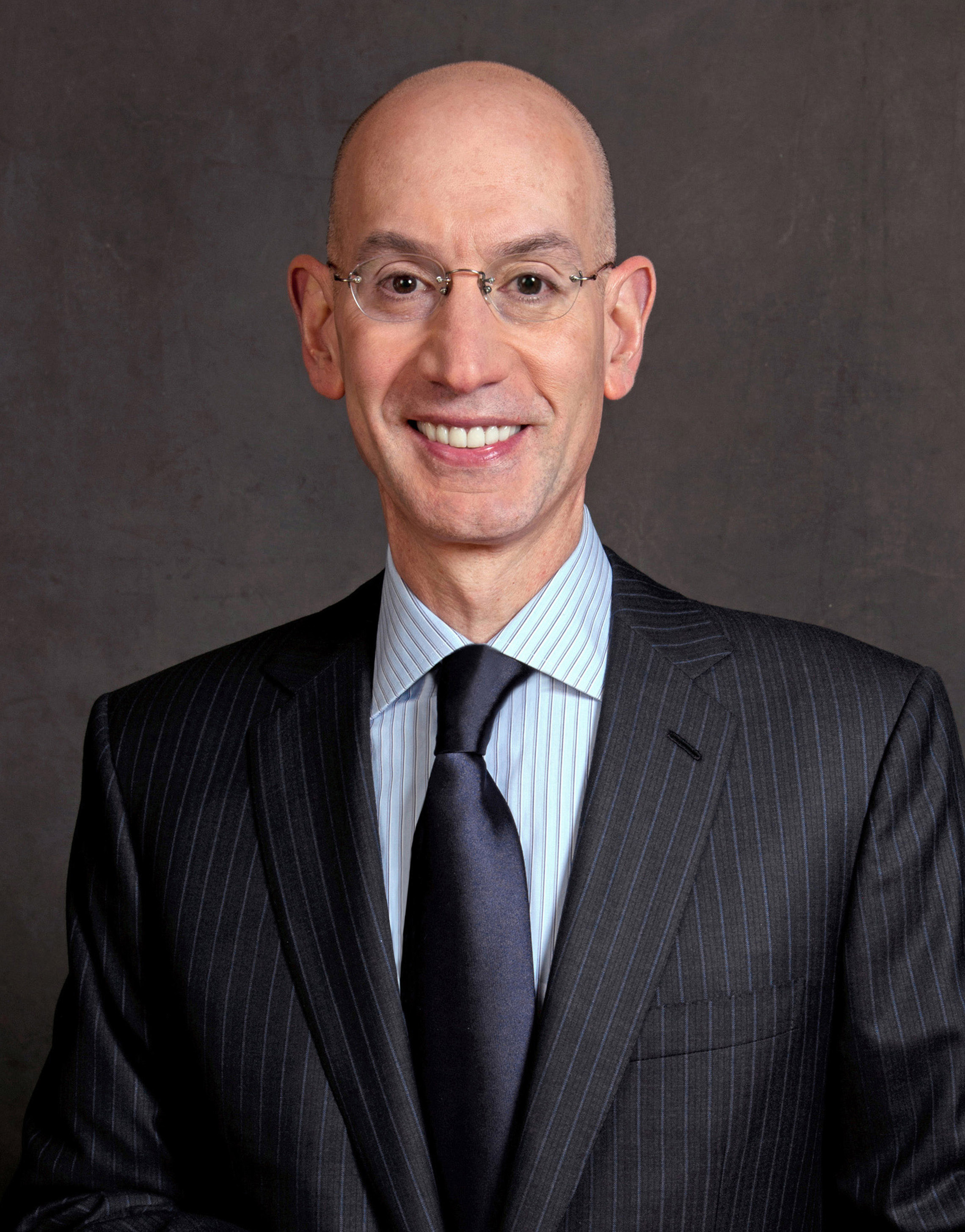
- Incumbent; Adam Silver since February 1, 2014
- Inaugural holder: Maurice Podoloff
- Formation: 1946
- Deputy: Mark Tatum
- Website: Careers.NBA.com

The commissioner of the NBA is the chief executive of the National Basketball Association (NBA). The current commissioner is Adam Silver, who succeeded David Stern and assumed office on February 1, 2014.

== List of NBA commissioners ==
Overview of Commissioners of the NBA
Image	Name	Deputy	Tenure start	Tenure end	Tenure length
	Maurice Podoloff	—	June 6, 1946	April 30, 1963	16 years and 328 days
	J. Walter Kennedy	Simon Gourdine	May 1, 1963	May 31, 1975	12 years and 31 days
	Larry O'Brien	Simon Gourdine	June 1, 1975	January 31, 1984	8 years and 245 days
	David Stern	Russ Granik; Adam Silver	February 1, 1984	January 31, 2014	30 years and 0 days
	Adam Silver	Mark Tatum	February 1, 2014	Incumbent	12 years and 273 days

== Maurice Podoloff (1946–1963) ==
Maurice Podoloff was the first president of the NBA. He served from the league's founding as the Basketball Association of America (BAA) in 1946 until 1963.

After the BAA signed several of the top names in the National Basketball League (NBL) into the league, Podoloff negotiated a merger between the two groups to form the National Basketball Association in 1949. As a lawyer with no previous basketball experience, Podoloff's great organizational and administrative skills were later regarded as the key factor that kept the league alive in its often stormy formative years.

In 17 years as president, Podoloff expanded the NBA to as many as 19 teams. He also briefly formed three divisions and scheduled 558 games.

During his tenure, Podoloff introduced the collegiate draft in 1947, and in 1954 instituted the 24 second shot clock created by Dan Biasone, owner of the Syracuse Nationals which quickened the pace of games, and took the NBA from a slow plodding game to a fast-paced sport. In 1954, Podoloff also increased national recognition of the game immensely by securing its first television contract.

As the commissioner of the NBA, he was the one who gave lifetime suspensions to Indianapolis Olympians players Ralph Beard and Alex Groza, not for what they did in the NBA but for point shaving in college at the University of Kentucky.

Maurice Podoloff stepped down as NBA commissioner in 1963. During his period in office, he had helped increase fan interest during the NBA's formative years and improved the overall welfare of the sport of basketball through his foresight, wisdom, and leadership. In his honor, the NBA would name its annual league Most Valuable Player trophy the Maurice Podoloff Trophy.

== J. Walter Kennedy (1963–1975) ==
Succeeding the league’s first president, Maurice Podoloff, J. Walter Kennedy adopted a more assertive leadership style and made his positions on key issues clear. He moved quickly to assert his authority, fining Red Auerbach $500 for rowdy conduct during a 1963 preseason game. At the time, this was the largest fine imposed on a coach or player in NBA history.

His title was changed to "commissioner" in 1967. Kennedy was also the commissioner who upheld the first protest ever in the NBA, which was the one filed by the Chicago Bulls for the "Phantom Buzzer Game" against the Atlanta Hawks in 1969.

The new commissioner came into the NBA when the league was struggling with only nine teams, no television contract, sagging attendance and competition from the increasingly popular American Basketball Association. When Kennedy retired in 1975 as commissioner, the league had increased to 18 teams, landed a lucrative television contract and improved its financial standing considerably, experienced a 200 percent boost in income and attendance figures tripled during his tenure.

Walter Kennedy was also instrumental in bringing an annual NBA game to Springfield to benefit the Naismith Memorial Basketball Hall of Fame, where he served on Hall of Fame's Board of Trustees for 13 years, including two years as the Hall of Fame's President. Kennedy himself would be inducted into the Hall in 1981. The J. Walter Kennedy Citizenship Award is named in Kennedy's honor.

== Larry O'Brien (1975–1984) ==
Larry O'Brien was appointed in 1975 by the National Basketball Association to serve nationally as its commissioner, where he directed the successful ABA–NBA merger, adding four teams from the American Basketball Association to the NBA. He negotiated television-broadcast agreements with CBS and saw game attendance increase significantly. He continued this service through 1984. The NBA Championship Trophy was renamed in 1984 the Larry O'Brien NBA Championship Trophy in honor of his service to the sport of basketball.

However, his league was troubled by public relations issues through his tenure, especially after the merger. He was generally pushed by his staff into many of his decisions, most notably by his successor as NBA commissioner, David Stern. Many consider Stern the driving force behind the television contracts with CBS and rise in game attendance, as well as several crucial issues that predicated the rise of the NBA in the early 1980s.

O'Brien was inducted into the Naismith Memorial Basketball Hall of Fame, located in his birthplace, Springfield, Massachusetts.

=== NBA career highlights ===
- League expanded from 18 to 23 teams
- Coordinated the NBA's richest TV contract to date (1982)
- Brought the NBA to cable television (ESPN and USA) in 1982, establishing the league as a pioneer of cable TV
- Negotiated two landmark collective bargaining agreements (1976, 1983)
- Modified the college draft and restored peace to a league in the midst of legal turmoil (1976)
- Negotiated the ABA–NBA merger as the Denver Nuggets, San Antonio Spurs, Indiana Pacers, and New York Nets joined the league, the Kentucky Colonels and Spirits of St. Louis were bought out, and the Virginia Squires folded
- Introduced salary cap (1983)
- Orchestrated the 1976 settlement of the Oscar Robertson suit, creating a fair and equitable system of free agency for veterans
- Annual NBA attendance reached 10 million during his tenure
- Gate receipts doubled and television revenue tripled during his time as commissioner
- Established NBA College Scholarship program (1980)
- Reached a stringent anti-drug agreement with the National Basketball Players Association (1983)
- Oversaw the adoption of the three-point field goal in the NBA (1979)

== David Stern (1984–2014) ==
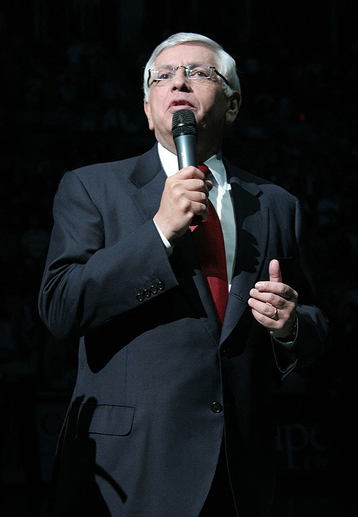
David Stern in 2007

On February 1, 1984, David Stern was selected to be the commissioner of the NBA, succeeding Larry O'Brien. It was during that same year (1984–85) that four of the NBA's biggest superstars – Hakeem Olajuwon, Michael Jordan, Charles Barkley, and John Stockton—entered the league.

The arrival of Michael Jordan, in particular, ushered in a new era of commercial bounty for the NBA. With him came his flair and talent for the game, and that brought in source contracts from Nike which helped to give the league even more national attention. Jordan and the two other premier basketball players of the 1980s, Larry Bird and Magic Johnson, took the game to new heights of popularity and profit. By 2004, Stern oversaw the NBA's expansion from 23 to 30 franchises (since 1988), expansion into Canada, and televising games in countries around the world.

Stern also oversaw the creation of the Women's National Basketball Association (WNBA), a professional women's basketball league. Stern has been credited for developing and broadening the NBA's audience, by setting up training camps, playing exhibition games around the world, and recruiting more international players.

The NBA now has eleven offices in cities outside the United States, is televised in 215 countries around the world in 43 languages, and operates the WNBA and the National Basketball Development League under Stern's watch.

Following a Board of Governors meeting in October 2012, Stern announced that he would retire from the office of Commissioner by February 1, 2014. It was also announced that he would be succeeded by then-Deputy Commissioner and Chief Operating Officer Adam Silver. Stern stepped down from the position at end of day on January 31, 2014, concluding a 30-year tenure to the day.

=== Notable events during Stern's tenure ===
- Appointed Deputy Commissioner of the NBA Russ Granik, who negotiated four straight collective bargaining agreements with the NBA players' union and lobbied for eligibility changes that directly led to the Dream Team of 1992.
- Built 28 new arenas (10 since 1999)
- Relocation of six NBA franchises (Clippers, Kings, Grizzlies, Hornets/Pelicans, SuperSonics/Thunder, and Nets)
- Seven new NBA teams (Bobcats/Hornets, Hornets/Pelicans, Heat, Timberwolves, Magic, Grizzlies, and Raptors)
- Ratification of the NBA dress code.
- The removal of hand-checking after the 2004 NBA Finals.
- Established the "No tolerance rule" in 2006, allowing officials to assign technical fouls on players for complaining about officiating.
- Instituted the lottery prior to the draft.
- Instituted a minimum age of 19 to be eligible for the draft, beginning in 2005. This led to a proliferation of "one-and-done" players in college basketball.
- NBA Finals Trophy renamed to the Larry O'Brien Trophy.
- NBA Finals MVP Trophy renamed to the Bill Russell NBA Finals Most Valuable Player Award.
- Four NBA lockouts (1995, 1996, 1998–1999, and 2011)
- FBI-affirmed accusations of game-fixing involving referee Tim Donaghy
- Issued fines on players for flopping.
- Instituted a 2–3–2 format for the NBA Finals in 1985, only to move back to the 2–2–1–1–1 format in October 2013 at the behest of his second Deputy Commissioner, Adam Silver.

== Adam Silver (2014–present) ==
On February 1, 2014, Adam Silver was unanimously approved to succeed David Stern and assumed office as Commissioner of the NBA. Originally the Deputy Commissioner from 2006 through 2014, he was a protege of Stern, who endorsed Silver to be his replacement in October 2013. Previously, Silver worked as senior vice president of NBA Entertainment, president of NBA Entertainment, a special assistant to the commissioner, NBA chief of staff, and Deputy Commissioner under Stern. Basketballs for games now contain Silver's signature, a first for the NBA. Silver hand-picked Mark Tatum as his Deputy Commissioner and Chief Operating Officer. Tatum is the first African American Deputy Commissioner of the NBA in history.

Three months into Silver's tenure, he banned Los Angeles Clippers owner Donald Sterling from the league for life in response to racist comments made by Sterling during a private telephone conversation with Sterling's girlfriend. Additionally, he fined Sterling US$2.5 million, the maximum allowed under the NBA Constitution, and urged owners to vote to expel Sterling from ownership of the Clippers, which they eventually did. Former Microsoft CEO Steve Ballmer became the new owner of the Clippers.

Six years into Silver's tenure, he announced that the league would suspend operations as a result of Rudy Gobert testing positive for COVID-19.

== See also ==
Commissioners of major professional sports leagues in the United States and Canada:

- Commissioner of the National Football League
- Commissioner of Baseball
- NHL commissioner
