= Flop (basketball) =

Feigning being fouled in basketball

In basketball, a flop is an intentional fall or stagger by a player, after little or no physical contact by an opponent, to induce an official to call a personal foul on the opponent. The move is sometimes called acting, as in "acting as if he were fouled". Because it is inherently designed to deceive the official, flopping is considered unsportsmanlike, but it is widely practiced. The player who commits the act is called a flopper.

Flopping effectively is not easy to do, primarily because drawing contact sometimes results in the opposite effect—a foul called on the defensive player—for making excessive contact or not being in the correct position. Also, if no foul is called on either player, by falling to the floor, the flopper cannot provide further defense, making it easier for the offense to score. To consistently draw offensive fouls on opponents takes body control and practice.

== Penalties ==
In the National Basketball Association (NBA), the penalty for flopping is a technical foul if caught in-game, and a fine if caught after the game in video reviews. The technical foul is a non-unsportsmanlike conduct technical foul (one of six fouls a player may be assessed before disqualification; no ejection is possible). In FIBA play, the penalty is a technical foul that counts as one of two towards ejection.

National Federation of State High School Associations basketball rule 10.6.f of 2012–13 specifically defines "faking being fouled", in the judgment of an official, as unsportsmanlike conduct subject to penalty of a technical foul. However, as there is no in-game access to replay video, this call is rare.

== NBA ==
The NBA ruled in 1997 that the personal foul of charging would not be called once the ball carrier was within 4 feet (1.22 meters) of the basket. This restricted arc is noted with a dashed circle. This rule made it pointless to flop near the basket.

The NBA regulated flopping starting in the 2012–13 season. Any player who flops during the regular season would first be warned, followed by fines in increments of $5,000 for each successive flop during the season. The fines would increase to $30,000 for a fifth offense, when a suspension would also be considered. In the playoffs, players are fined $5,000 for their first flopping offense, $10,000 for a second, $15,000 for a third, and $30,000 for a fourth. Any player who flops five or more times could be suspended.

=== History ===
Frank Ramsey, who played on seven championship teams for the Boston Celtics from 1954 to 1965, wrote a cover story in Sports Illustrated in 1963 with writer Frank Deford, where he detailed his flopping technique. Afterwards, Ramsey was reprimanded in a letter by NBA president Walter Kennedy. In the 1970s, Ramsey's coach, Red Auerbach, criticized flopping in one of his "Red on Roundball" segments at halftime during NBA game telecasts.

On May 28, 2008, the NBA announced that it would impose fines on players who show a clear case of flopping and suspensions for repeat offenders. However, the league did not impose any fines, but continued to monitor the situation.

NBA player Rasheed Wallace has been critical of flopping in the league. In a 2008 interview, when he was with the Detroit Pistons, he complained that:

"All that bull[expletive]-ass calls they had out there. With Mike [Callahan] and Kenny [Mauer] -- you've all seen that [expletive]," Wallace said. "You saw them calls. The cats are flopping all over the floor and they're calling that [expletive]. That [expletive] ain't basketball out there. It's all [expletive] entertainment. You all should know that [expletive]. It's all [expletive] entertainment." (redactions in original)

On November 28, 2009, Wallace, by this time with the Boston Celtics, again made sports news wires when he claimed that Hedo Türkoğlu, then with the Toronto Raptors, duped the officials into giving Wallace his fifth technical of the season by flopping:

They've got to know that he's a damn flopper. That's all Turkododo do. Flopping shouldn't get you nowhere. He acts like I shot him. That's not basketball, man. That's not defense. That's garbage, what it is. I'm glad I don't have too much of it left.

Commissioner David Stern complained about flopping as offensive against the game's officials, but the league has been unable to find a way to punish it or prevent it. And, although Stern agreed with Wallace in principle, the league fined Wallace $25,000 for the 2008 outburst (because of the obscenities) and $30,000 for the second.

Shaquille O'Neal loathes opponents who resort to flopping. He criticized Dikembe Mutombo, the 2000–2001 Defensive Player of the Year, in the 2001 NBA Finals and Vlade Divac in the 2002 Western Conference finals for their theatrics. O'Neal said he would never exaggerate contact to draw a foul. "I'm a guy with no talent who has gotten this way with hard work." In a 2006 interview in Time, O'Neal said if he were NBA commissioner, he would "Make a guy have to beat a guy--not flop and get calls and be nice to the referees and kiss ass." However, in a matchup against the Orlando Magic on March 3, 2009, O'Neal flopped against center Dwight Howard. Magic coach Stan Van Gundy was "very disappointed cause [O'Neal] knows what it's like. Let's stand up and play like men, and I think our guy did that tonight." O'Neal responded, "Flopping is playing like that your whole career. I was trying to take the charge, trying to get a call. It probably was a flop, but flopping is the wrong use of words. Flopping would describe his coaching."

Shortly before the Indiana Pacers were to take on the Miami Heat in the 2012 Eastern Conference semifinals, Pacers head coach Frank Vogel criticized his opponents for alleged flopping:

They are the biggest flopping team in the NBA. It'll be very interesting [to see] how the referees officiate the series and how much flopping they reward... Every drive to the basket, they have guys not making a play on the ball, but sliding in front of drivers. Oftentimes they're falling down even before contact is even being made. It'll be interesting to see how the series is officiated.

Vogel was fined $15,000 by the league for these remarks.

In May 2012, Commissioner David Stern reiterated that flopping is a legitimate concern. Fines for flopping were introduced the following season. On November 21, 2012, Brooklyn Nets forward Reggie Evans became the first NBA player to be fined for flopping. After having been warned for a previous offense, the NBA league office identified an instance of flopping on Evans in the Nets' loss to the Los Angeles Lakers on November 20, 2012. Evans was fined $5,000. The rate of violations slowed as the season progressed, an indication that players realized the rule was being enforced. There were 24 violations during that regular season, with five players receiving the $5,000 fine for a second offense.

In the 2013 Eastern Conference semifinals between the Chicago Bulls and the Miami Heat, Bulls head coach Tom Thibodeau accused LeBron James of flopping. James vehemently denied the accusation, saying "I don't need to flop. I play an aggressive game but I don't flop. I've never been one of those guys. I don't need to flop. I don't even know how to do it. So it doesn't mean much to me." Thibodeau was fined $35,000 by the league for his comments. Nonetheless, James was seen winking after a flop in Game 5 of the Eastern Conference semifinals in 2011. On May 29, 2013, before Game 4 of the Eastern Conference Finals against Indiana Pacers, James again denied that he is a flopper, but said that he recognizes flopping as an effective strategy. "Some guys have been [flopping] for years, just trying to get an advantage. Any way you can get an advantage over the opponent to help your team win, so be it," James said.

As of June 14, 2013, eight players had been fined for flopping during the playoffs: Pacers' Jeff Pendergraph, Thunder's Derek Fisher, Knicks' J. R. Smith, Grizzlies' Tony Allen, Heat's LeBron James and Chris Bosh, Pacers' David West and Lance Stephenson. Stern said that the amounts of the fines were insufficient "when the average player's salary is $5.5 million. And anyone who thought that was going to happen was allowing hope to prevail over reason."

On June 7, 2013, Dallas Mavericks owner Mark Cuban announced that he is funding a study on flopping. One of Cuban's companies, Radical Hoops Ltd., has provided $100,000 to have biomechanics experts from Southern Methodist University launch an 18-month study into the forces involved in collisions during basketball plays. The goal is to investigate the possibility of using video or motion capture techniques to distinguish between legitimate collision and flop. The Mavericks' Dirk Nowitzki did not believe that flops were a problem if a player was pushed and tried "sell it a little" to get a favorable call from referees.

== See also ==
- Diving (association football)
- Diving (ice hockey)
