= Judge Hickey =

Judge Hickey may refer to:

- John J. Hickey (1911–1970), judge of the United States Court of Appeals for the Tenth Circuit
- Susan O. Hickey (born 1955), judge of the United States District Court for the Western District of Arkansas
- William F. Hickey Jr. (1929–2016), judge of the Connecticut Superior Court
- William J. Hickey (1873–1953), judge of the New York Supreme Court
