= David Stern =

American businessman, lawyer, and NBA commissioner (1942–2020)

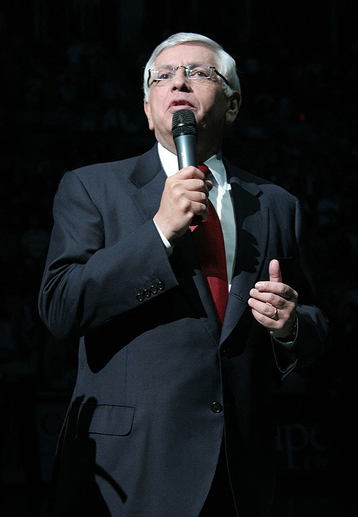
- Stern in 2007

4th Commissioner of the NBA
- In office February 1, 1984 – February 1, 2014
- Deputy: Russ Granik (1990–2006); Adam Silver (2006–2014)
- Preceded by: Larry O'Brien
- Succeeded by: Adam Silver

Personal details
- Born: David Joel Stern; September 22, 1942 New York City, U.S.
- Died: January 1, 2020 (aged 77) New York City, U.S.
- Spouse: Dianne Bock (m. 1963)
- Children: 2
- Education: Rutgers University (BA); Columbia University (JD)
- Profession: Businessman; lawyer
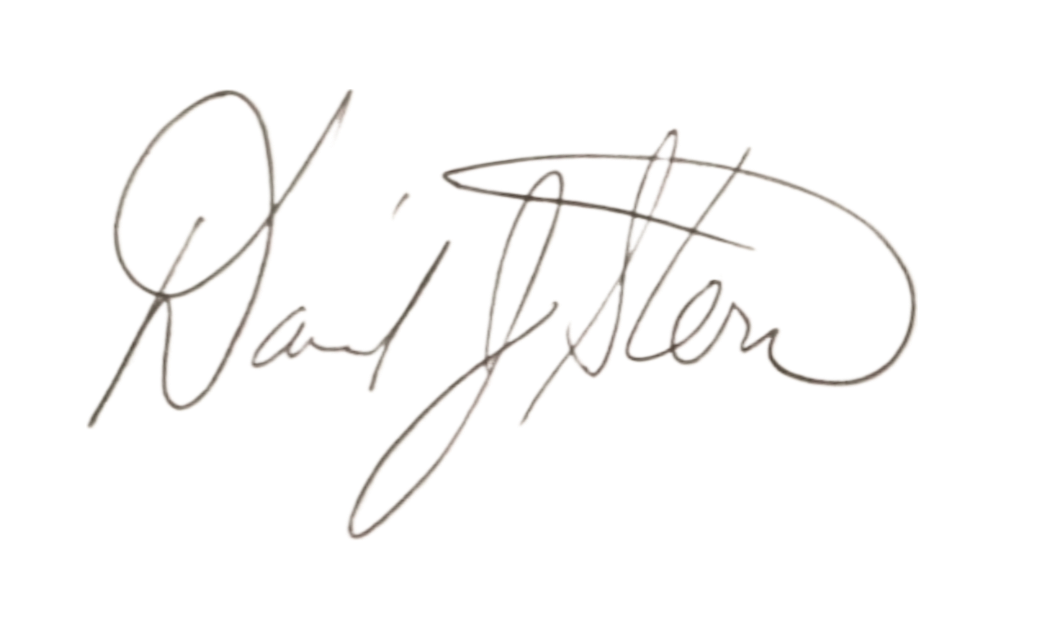
- Signature

David Joel Stern (September 22, 1942 – January 1, 2020) was an American lawyer and business executive who was the commissioner of the National Basketball Association (NBA) from 1984 to 2014. He oversaw NBA basketball's growth into one of the world's most popular sports during the 1990s and 2000s. Stern is credited with developing and broadening the NBA's audience, especially internationally by setting up training camps, playing exhibition games, and recruiting more international players. In addition, with his guidance, the NBA opened 12 offices in cities outside the United States, and broadcast to over 200 territories in over 40 languages. Stern also helped found the Women's National Basketball Association and the NBA G League, the NBA's development league. Under Stern, the NBA launched their digital presence with NBA.com, NBA TV, and NBA League Pass. He also established the NBA's social responsibility program, NBA Cares.

Stern started with the NBA in 1966 as an outside counsel, then joined the NBA in 1978 as general counsel and became the league's executive vice president in 1980. He became commissioner in 1984, succeeding Larry O'Brien. After 30 years, Stern retired in 2014 as the longest-tenured commissioner in the history of major North American sports leagues (though his record has since been broken). He was succeeded by Adam Silver. Stern was inducted into the Naismith Memorial Basketball Hall of Fame and FIBA Hall of Fame. He was on the Rutgers University Board of Overseers, a Director of Jazz at Lincoln Center and chair of JALC's Marketing Committee, and was a Chair Emeritus of the Board of Trustees of Columbia University. Stern was also a member of the Council on Foreign Relations.

== Early life ==
David Stern was born on September 22, 1942, in Manhattan, New York City, one of three children of Anna (née Bronstein, 1918–1990) and William Stern (1918–1980), into a Jewish family. He grew up in Teaneck, New Jersey, and his father ran a Jewish delicatessen in the Chelsea neighborhood of Manhattan. Stern grew up a New York Knicks fan, considered Carl Braun his hero, and attended games at Madison Square Garden with his father. Stern played basketball briefly in adulthood before sustaining a serious right knee injury during a New York Lawyers League game.

After graduating from Teaneck High School in 1959, Stern went to Rutgers University, where he was a member of the Sigma Alpha Mu fraternity and graduated in 1963 with a B.A. in history. Stern then attended Columbia Law School, receiving a J.D. in 1966.

== National Basketball Association ==
=== Early work ===
After graduating from law school, Stern joined the law firm of Proskauer, Rose, Goetz & Mendelsohn (now Proskauer Rose), which has long represented the NBA. He was the lead attorney representing the firm in the case of Robertson v. National Basketball Association, the landmark lawsuit brought against the NBA by star player Oscar Robertson. Stern helped the league negotiate a settlement that allowed the NBA/ABA merger to proceed in return for the NBA abolishing the "option" clause in its uniform player contract and allowing players to become free agents for the first time.

In 1978, Stern left Proskauer Rose to become the NBA's general counsel under Commissioner Larry O'Brien. By 1980, O'Brien promoted Stern to be the NBA's executive vice president for business and legal affairs, which made Stern de facto in charge of marketing, television, and public relations for the league. During this time, Stern largely drove two landmark agreements with the NBA Players' Association: drug testing and team salary cap. An August 1980 report by the Los Angeles Times had estimated that 40 to 75 percent of NBA players used cocaine. The drug testing policy dealt with the perception that the NBA had a drug problem, which it admitted, and it was cleaning it up. The NBA was the first of the major sports leagues in North America to implement a drug testing policy. The salary cap created a revenue-sharing system where owner and player were effectively partners, with players receiving 53 percent of all revenues. Both of these agreements solidified Stern's standing inside NBA circles.

=== NBA Commissioner ===
On February 1, 1984, Stern became the Commissioner of the NBA, succeeding O'Brien during the league's recovery from its darkest period. Instead of marketing the league's teams, he changed the focus to its star players, such as Magic Johnson and Larry Bird, and Michael Jordan and Charles Barkley from the 1984 NBA draft, which was held soon after Stern took office. Jordan's arrival, in particular, ushered in a new era of commercial bounty for the NBA. With him came his flair and talent for the game, and that brought in shoe contracts from Nike which helped to give the league even more national attention.

Stern guided the league through dwindling viewership en route to global growth. In his first year as commissioner, Stern offered Adrian Paenza, a South American basketball and soccer analyst, and the Argentina Channel 9 the rights to air weekly NBA highlights for $2,000 a year. In 1987, he started the shipping of VHS tapes from his New York office to China's state-run television station to expand the league's reach beyond North America. Stern pushed to allow NBA players to participate in international tournaments, contributing to the creation of the 1992 U.S. Olympic team, dubbed the "Dream Team", which begat the first wave of international NBA stars.

One of the Dream Team members was Johnson. A year earlier, he announced that he was HIV-positive and retiring from basketball in a press conference with Stern sitting by his side. At the time, the public was afraid of HIV and the disease was demonized. Some people feared it could be transmitted by sweat or a handshake. Despite backlash, Stern allowed Johnson to play in the 1992 NBA All-Star Game and later for the Dream Team. Having read medical literature and consulted experts, Stern helped inform league owners, players, sponsors and the public about the virus. The NBA put infection-control procedures in place; previously, players were allowed to play while bleeding.

In 1995, the NBA expanded into Canada, introducing the Toronto Raptors and the Vancouver Grizzlies to the league. During Stern's tenure, a total of seven new franchises (the Hornets, Timberwolves, Heat, Magic, Grizzlies, Raptors, and Bobcats) were admitted to the NBA, bringing the number of teams in the league to 30 by 2004.

In 2000, it was revealed that the Minnesota Timberwolves had tampered with Joe Smith two years earlier by promising him a more lucrative contract in future years in exchange for signing him below market value so they could sign more players in the short-term. The NBA voided the last year of Smith's contract, fined the franchise $3.5 million and took away the Timberwolves' next three 1st-round NBA draft picks. Although many believed that tampering is a common practice, Stern abided by arbitrator Kenneth Dam's ruling that the Timberwolves had signed the secret agreement, and denied that the league was making an example of the Timberwolves.

Before the 2005–06 season, the NBA announced a new dress code, which banned players from wearing headphones, chains, shorts, sleeveless shirts, indoor sunglasses, T-shirts, jerseys and headgear such as baseball caps during NBA-related public appearances. Allen Iverson criticized the policy: "They're targeting guys who dress like me, guys who dress hip-hop ... I think they went way overboard." A decade later, Stern's edict was credited with spawning a style trend among NBA stars toward high fashion.

Stern advocated a minimum age limit for NBA players. Starting with the 2006 NBA draft, players could no longer be selected straight out of high school and needed to be at least 19 years old, creating the one-and-done rule. In 2001, Stern had stated, "If these kids have the ability to get a little more maturity, a little more coaching, a little bit more life experience overall, that's good." He was criticized for his reference to the 18-year-old adults, most of whom were African American, as "these kids", when other professional sports and occupations allowed 18-year-olds.

For the 2006–07 season the NBA introduced a new "microfiber" basketball for use in NBA games, replacing the previous style ball used since 1970. Dallas Mavericks owner Mark Cuban agreed with the need for a new ball, claiming the old style ball was inconsistent. Many of the league's most prominent players openly expressed their dislike for the new ball, such as Shaquille O'Neal who said, "Feels like one of those cheap balls that you buy at the toy store." A study, financed by Cuban, claimed that the new ball "bounces 5 to 8% lower than typical leather balls when dropped from 4 feet...[and] the new ball bounces 30% more erratically."

However, Stern initially refused to go back to the original ball despite many complaints by players about the new ball. Two months into the season, the National Basketball Players Association filed a grievance related to the quality of the ball and the cuts it had caused on players' fingers. Stern acknowledged that the NBA "could have done a better job" with the decision and implementation, and that it would have been better to get the players' input in advance. On December 11, 2006, the NBA announced that it would in fact switch back to the leather ball starting on January 1, 2007.

In 2007, Stern injected himself in the controversy surrounding the purchase and subsequent relocation of the Seattle SuperSonics by Oklahoman Clay Bennett and his ownership group. His support for the surprising move from the nation's 14th-largest market to the 45th was questioned by many both in the public and media. Stern's tenure saw the relocation of six NBA franchises.

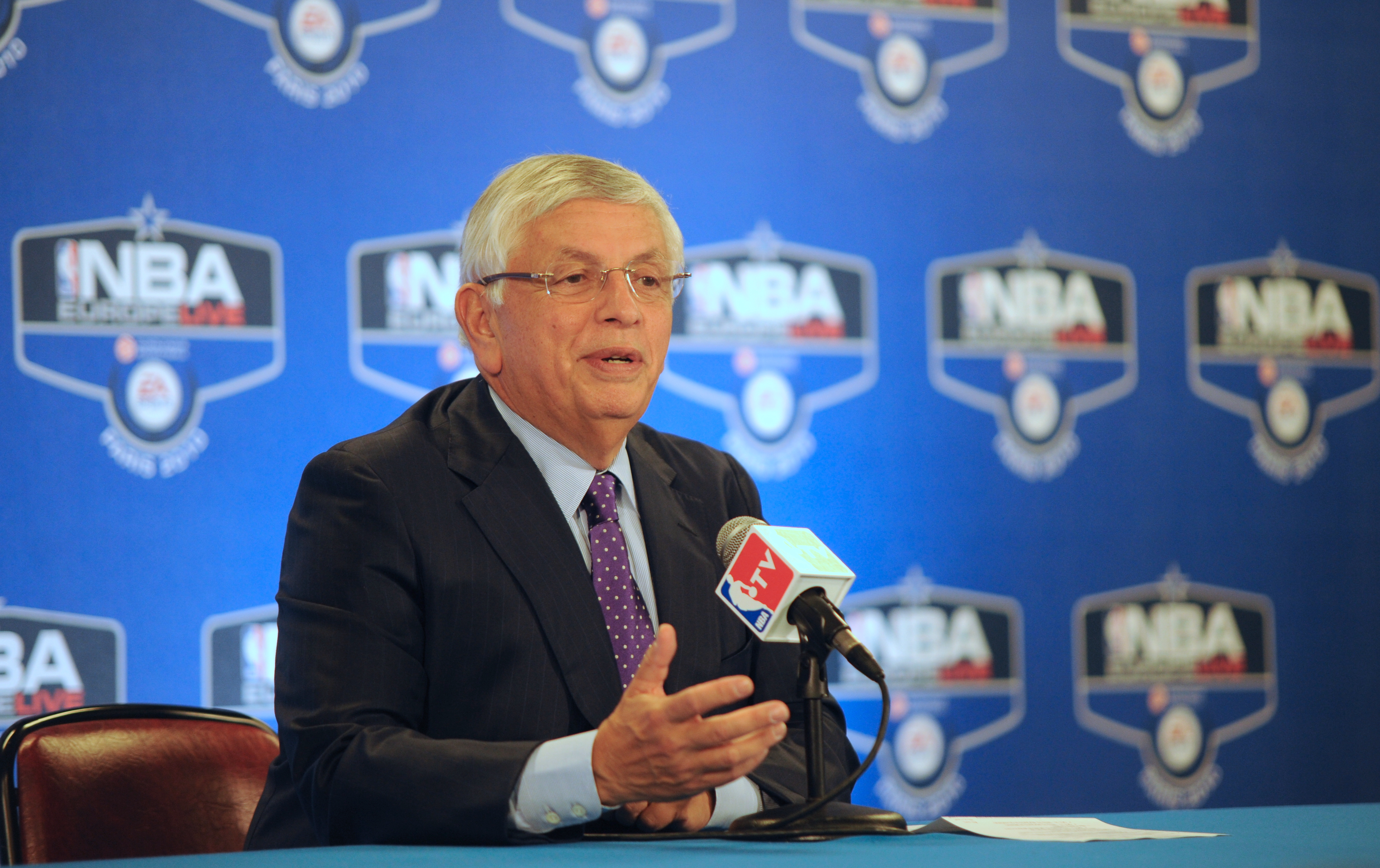
Stern in 2010

In the summer of 2011, the NBA lockout cost the league regular-season games for the second time in league history; the first occurred during the 1998–99 lockout. Those were the only times the league has lost games as a result of work stoppages. Stern was known as a relentless negotiator. During the 2011 lockout, he was accused by HBO commentator Bryant Gumbel of being "some kind of modern-day plantation overseer", a reference to the division between the NBA's primarily white owners and its predominantly black players.

On December 8, 2011, Stern vetoed a three-team trade that would have sent Chris Paul to the Lakers, Lamar Odom to the league-owned Hornets, and Pau Gasol to the Rockets for what a spokesman would only say were "basketball reasons". Early reactions from around the league, fanbase, and media were all largely negative, with players taking to Twitter to express their concerns, and several noted sports journalists criticizing the decision. The deal was maligned especially because of the conflict of interest posed by the league's ownership of one of its teams.

On October 25, 2012, Stern announced that he would step down as NBA commissioner on February 1, 2014, after exactly 30 years in the role, longer than each of his three predecessors. He was succeeded by his deputy Adam Silver, but remained affiliated with the league with the title of commissioner emeritus.

Stern received the Olympic Order in 2012. In 2014, Stern was inducted to the Naismith Memorial Basketball Hall of Fame. In 2016, he became a member of the FIBA Hall of Fame.

== Personal life and death ==
Stern was married to Dianne Bock Stern, and they had two sons: Eric and Andrew. They resided in Scarsdale, New York. By the later years of his commissionership, Stern was earning a $9 million salary. He stood at 5 feet 9 inches (1.75 m).

On December 12, 2019, Stern suffered a brain hemorrhage and underwent emergency surgery. He died in Manhattan a few weeks later on January 1, 2020, at age 77. In remembrance of Stern, all NBA teams wore black bands on their jerseys for the remainder of the 2019–20 season. Several basketball legends and players mourned his death, including LeBron James, Michael Jordan, Magic Johnson, and Kobe Bryant, who died 25 days after Stern.

== Filmography ==
Year	Title	Role	Notes	Ref
2012	The Other Dream Team	Himself	Documentary about the Lithuania men's national basketball team at the 1992 Summer Olympics.	
