= Larry O'Brien =

American politician and basketball commissioner (1917–1990)

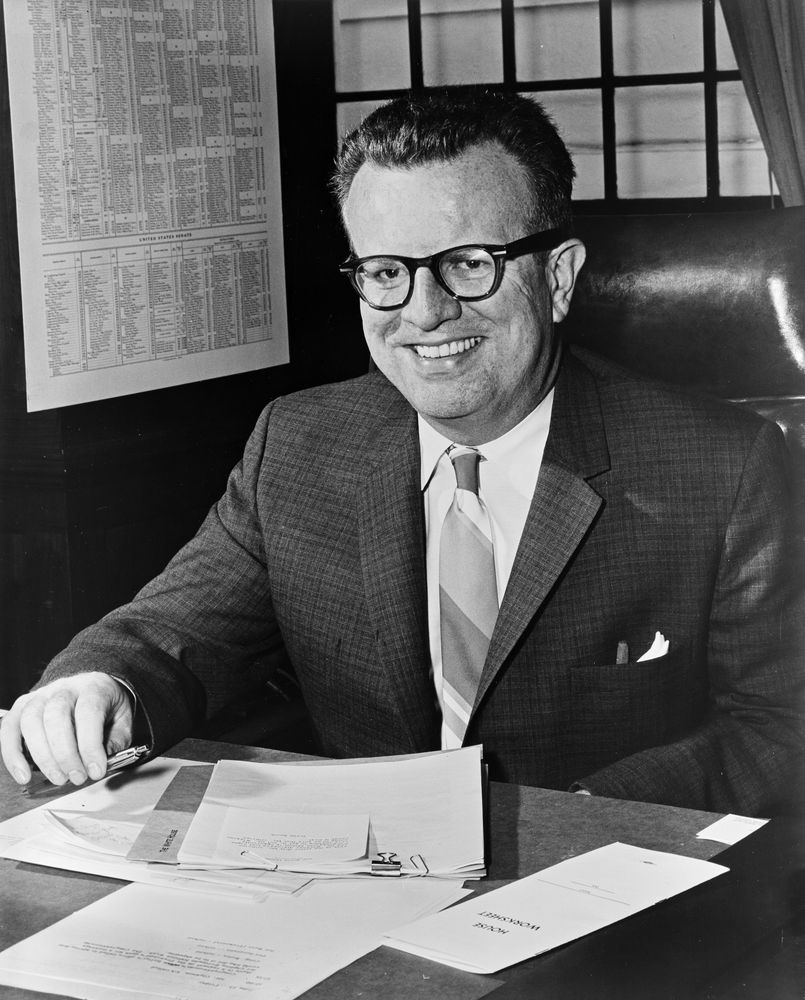
- O'Brien in 1961

3rd Commissioner of the NBA
- In office June 1, 1975 – January 31, 1984
- Preceded by: J. Walter Kennedy
- Succeeded by: David Stern

Chair of the Democratic National Committee
- In office March 5, 1970 – July 14, 1972
- Preceded by: Fred R. Harris
- Succeeded by: Jean Westwood
- In office August 30, 1968 – January 14, 1969
- Preceded by: John Moran Bailey
- Succeeded by: Fred R. Harris

60th United States Postmaster General
- In office November 3, 1965 – April 10, 1968
- President: Lyndon B. Johnson
- Preceded by: John A. Gronouski
- Succeeded by: W. Marvin Watson

White House Director of Legislative Affairs
- In office January 20, 1961 – November 3, 1965
- President: John F. Kennedy; Lyndon B. Johnson
- Preceded by: Bryce Harlow
- Succeeded by: Barefoot Sanders (1967)

Personal details
- Born: Lawrence Francis O'Brien Jr. July 7, 1917 Springfield, Massachusetts, U.S.
- Died: September 28, 1990 (aged 73) New York City, U.S.
- Party: Democratic
- Spouse: Elva Brassard (m. 1945)
- Children: 1
- Education: Northeastern University (LLB)

Lawrence Francis O'Brien Jr. (July 7, 1917 – September 28, 1990) was an American politician and commissioner of the National Basketball Association (NBA) from 1975 to 1984. He was one of the United States Democratic Party's leading electoral strategists for more than two decades. He was Postmaster General in President Lyndon Johnson's cabinet and chair of the Democratic National Committee. The NBA Championship Trophy is named after him.

The son of Irish immigrants, O'Brien was born in Springfield, Massachusetts. When he was not working in politics, O'Brien managed his family's real estate and worked in public relations.

== Early life and politics ==
O'Brien was born on July 7, 1917, in Springfield, Massachusetts. He learned about politics at a young age. His father, a local leader of the Democratic Party, recruited him at 11 years old to serve locally as a volunteer in the 1928 presidential campaign of Al Smith. O'Brien became a passionate Democrat. He earned a bachelor's degree in law in 1942 at the Northeastern University – Springfield Division, now known as the Western New England University School of Law. O'Brien married the former Elva Brassard in 1945. They had one son, Lawrence F. O'Brien III, who became a lobbyist.

He was appointed in 1946, 1948, and 1950 by his friend Foster Furcolo to serve locally as the director of his U.S. House of Representatives election campaigns. John F. Kennedy appointed O'Brien as the director of his 1952 Massachusetts U.S. Senate election campaign and of his 1958 reelection campaign. Kennedy's victories were largely attributed to O'Brien's recruitment, use of volunteers, and insistence on reaching voters in every corner of the state.

In 1959, O'Brien built the foundation for Kennedy's 1960 presidential campaign by canvassing the United States and working to connect with state Democratic stakeholders. He was appointed Kennedy's national campaign director. His election planning in key primary states such as Wisconsin and West Virginia helped defuse the anxiety of party heavyweights about Kennedy's Catholicism.

In 1960, President-elect Kennedy appointed O'Brien to recruit staff for his administration, In 1961, O'Brien became the special assistant to the president for congressional relations and personnel. He also had a major role in awarding patronage as one of Kennedy's inner circle of trusted advisers.

O'Brien's grassroots campaign strategies inspired a new trend in Democratic party primary and general election processes, a "statewide strategy", as opposed to traditional reliance on major city "political machines". As DNC chair he established a control structure for communications with state delegates and "dignitaries" that still exists, an achievement that cemented his role as perennial party leadership candidate.

O'Brien accompanied Kennedy and Jackie Kennedy on their trip to Texas in November 1963 and was riding in the motorcade in Dallas, where he was an eyewitness to Kennedy's assassination. After Kennedy was declared dead, O'Brien accompanied the coffin and Jackie Kennedy to Air Force One at Love Field. Aboard Air Force One, President Lyndon B. Johnson called for O'Brien and Kenny O'Donnell, asking both of them to work with him in the new administration. O'Brien had never been close to Johnson (and many writers, including Johnson biographer Robert Caro, reported that O'Brien did not like or trust him), but he remained at the White House and worked for him.

O'Brien was appointed Johnson's campaign director in 1964. Johnson appointed O'Brien to serve as special assistant to the president for congressional relations and personnel. In 1965, O'Brien was appointed United States Postmaster General.

In 1968, when Johnson declined to seek the Democratic presidential nomination again, O'Brien became Senator Robert F. Kennedy's campaign advisor. After RFK was assassinated, Vice President Hubert Humphrey hired O'Brien as his presidential campaign director.

O'Brien was also elected DNC chairman in 1968. He became infamous at the 1968 Democratic convention in Chicago for engineering a series of party convention rule changes that served to exclude Eugene McCarthy delegates from certain roles in the convention and disallowed commentary on Humphrey's Vietnam War involvement. He was reelected as chair in 1970. In that role he became a central figure in both the Watergate scandal and the "Eagleton Affair" of 1972. (Note: The June 16, 1972, Watergate break-in, which occurred during the E. Howard Hunt-headed and G. Gordon Liddy-supported Operation Gemstone by the White House Plumbers, which was conducted to replace the malfunctioning "bugs" that had been placed on May 28, 1972, as two surveillance devices, or phone taps, on the telephone lines of both Lawrence O’Brien, who was the chairman of the Democratic Party, and R. Spencer Oliver, a high-ranking Democratic Party official,)

The DNC Lawrence O'Brien Award was created in 1992 by his family and Democratic Party leaders to acknowledge the many years of service he gave to the party, his belief in the importance of volunteer contribution, and his role as counter-fixer to Cohn, Stone, Mitchell, et al. In his varied roles during the 1960s and early 1970s, O'Brien defined the role now recognized as the modern Democratic Party "Insider": someone who strategically connects national and state party campaign fund-raising and is rewarded with governmental roles in which he then funnels favors back to those funders.

=== Government ===
O'Brien's first post in Washington was in 1948 as Representative Foster Furcolo's administrative assistant.

He lobbied successfully during President Kennedy's first year for the expansion of the U.S. House of Representatives Standing Committee on rules to ensure a liberal and moderate majority. O'Brien also lobbied for increasing the minimum wage. In 1962 he acted as Kennedy's liaison to the Democratic Party during its midterm election campaigns.

During his tenure as Postmaster General, in September 1967, the Post Office Department canceled many "mail by rail" contracts, electing to move First Class mail via air and road transport. This had a devastating effect on passenger train revenue and led directly to the end of many passenger rail routes, which had relied on mail contracts to supplement their income.

The U.S. National Archives and Records Administration Lawrence F. O'Brien Gallery was named and opened in 2004 in his memory.

== NBA commissioner ==
Appointed commissioner in 1975, O'Brien oversaw the ABA–NBA merger and negotiated a broadcast agreement with CBS Television as game attendance significantly increased. In 1976, he was named The Sporting News Sportsman of the Year. In response to public relations issues after the merger, O'Brien pushed for an anti-drug agreement with the NBA Players Association to improve the league's image. Though the merger and expansion had solidified the NBA brand and games were broadcast live on weekends, it still did not have the TV exposure of other pro sports. In the late 1970s and 1980, CBS showed only tape-delayed broadcasts of weekday NBA playoff and Finals games after the late news.

After O'Brien retired in 1984, the NBA Championship Trophy was renamed the Larry O'Brien NBA Championship Trophy in honor of his service to the sport.

O'Brien was inducted into the Naismith Memorial Basketball Hall of Fame in 1991.

=== NBA career highlights ===
- Negotiated the ABA–NBA merger as the Denver Nuggets, San Antonio Spurs, Indiana Pacers, and New York Nets joined the league and the Kentucky Colonels and Spirits of St. Louis were bought out and Virginia Squires folded
- League grew from 18 to 23 teams (the four ABA teams and the expansion Dallas Mavericks)
- Coordinated the NBA's richest TV contract to date (1982)
- Brought the NBA to cable television (ESPN and USA) in 1982, establishing the league as a pioneer of cable TV
- Negotiated two landmark collective bargaining agreements (1976, 1983)
- Modified the college draft and restored peace to a league in the midst of legal turmoil (1976)
- Introduced salary cap (1983)
- Orchestrated the 1976 settlement of the Oscar Robertson suit, creating a fair and equitable system of free agency for veterans
- Annual NBA attendance reached 10 million during his tenure
- Gate receipts doubled and television revenue tripled during his time as commissioner
- Established NBA College Scholarship program (1980)
- Reached a stringent anti-drug agreement with the NBA Players Association (1983)
- Oversaw the adoption of the three-point field goal in the NBA (1979)

== Death ==
O'Brien died of cancer after surgery in Manhattan, New York, on September 28, 1990, at the age of 73, and was interred in St. Michaels Cemetery in Springfield, Massachusetts.

== Notes ==
Political offices
Preceded by Bryce Harlow	White House Director of Legislative Affairs; 1961–1965	Vacant Title next held by Barefoot Sanders; 1967
Preceded by John A. Gronouski	United States Postmaster General; 1965–1968	Succeeded by W. Marvin Watson
Party political offices
Preceded by John Bailey; Fred R. Harris	Chair of the Democratic National Committee; 1968–1969; 1970–1972	Succeeded by Fred R. Harris; Jean Westwood
