= Russ Granik =

American sports executive

Deputy Commissioner of the NBA
- In office February 1, 1990 – July 1, 2006
- Commissioner: David Stern
- Preceded by: Simon Gourdine
- Succeeded by: Adam Silver

Personal details
- Born: Russell T. Granik; July 10, 1948 (age 78) Spring Valley, New York U.S.
- Education: Dartmouth College (BA); Harvard University (JD)
- Profession: Businessman; lawyer

Russell T. Granik (born July 10, 1948) is an American sports and business executive who served as the Deputy Commissioner of the National Basketball Association (NBA) for 22 years. During his professional career, Granik served as the announcer of second-round picks in the NBA draft and in later years, the television host of the NBA Draft Lottery.

== NBA Deputy Commissioner ==
Granik was the lead negotiator for the NBA for the past four collective bargaining negotiations with the NBA players' union. He also represented the league in negotiating numerous television deals, and in his role with USA Basketball helped lobby FIBA, the world sanctioning body for basketball, to permit professional basketball players to play in the Olympic Games. That eligibility rule change led directly to the formation of the Dream Team that represented the United States at the 1992 Summer Olympics in Barcelona, Spain. He also served as President of USA Basketball and Chairperson of Naismith Memorial Basketball Hall of Fame.

He retired on July 1, 2006, after 30 years with the NBA.

== Education ==
Granik graduated magna cum laude from Dartmouth College in 1969 and from Harvard Law School.

== Honors ==
Granik was inducted into the Naismith Memorial Basketball Hall of Fame on September 8, 2013, alongside basketball legends including Gary Payton, Bernard King, Rick Pitino, and Jerry Tarkanian. He was enshrined into the Hall of Fame by Jerry Colangelo.
