= Oscar Robertson =

American basketball player (born 1938)

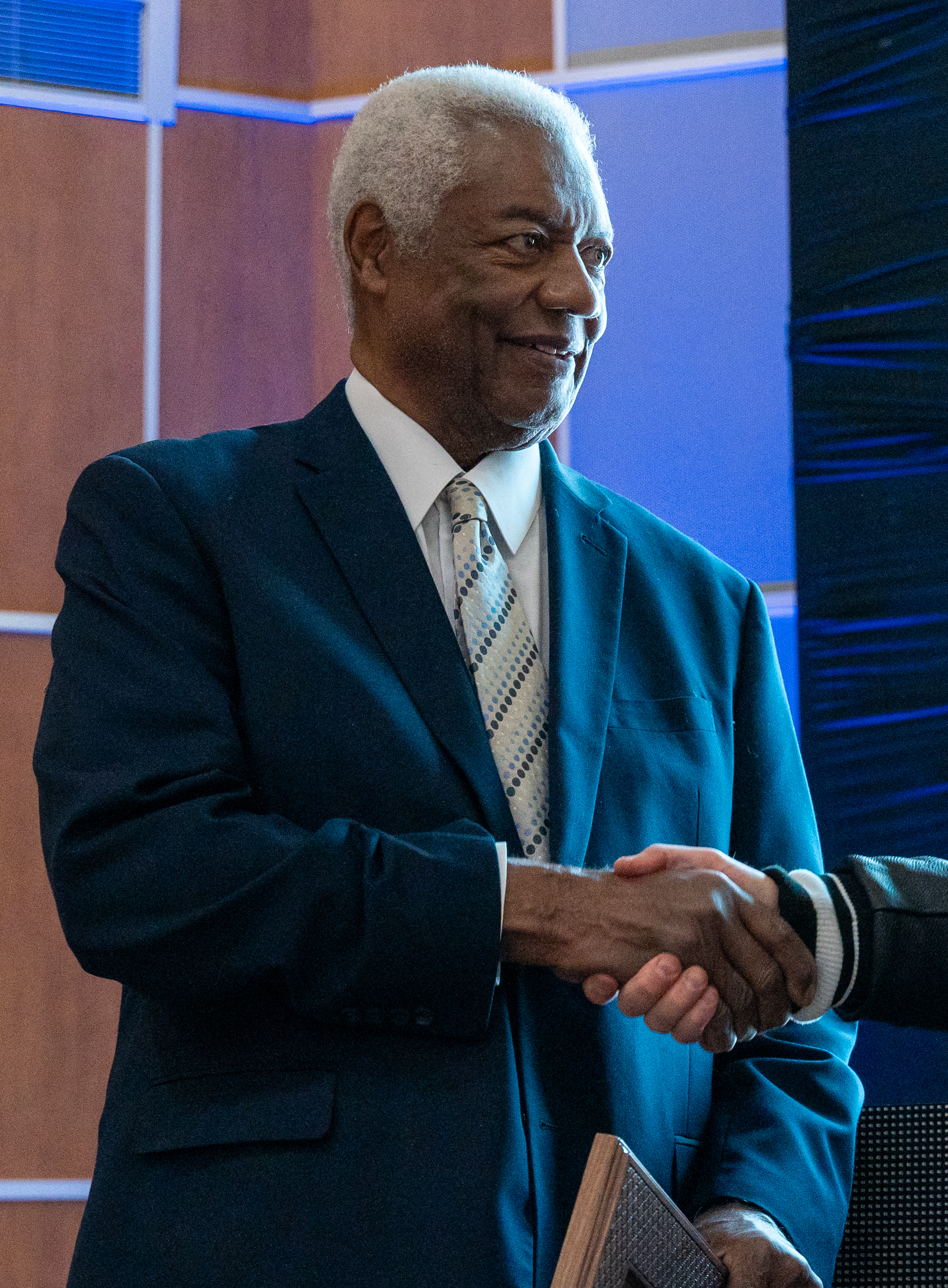
- Robertson in 2024

Personal information
- Born: November 24, 1938 (age 87) Charlotte, Tennessee, U.S.
- Listed height: 6 ft 5 in (1.96 m)
- Listed weight: 205 lb (93 kg)

Career information
- High school: Crispus Attucks (Indianapolis, Indiana)
- College: Cincinnati (1957–1960)
- NBA draft: 1960: territorial pick
- Drafted by: Cincinnati Royals
- Playing career: 1960–1974
- Position: Point guard
- Number: 14, 1

Career history
- 1960–1970: Cincinnati Royals
- 1970–1974: Milwaukee Bucks

Career highlights
- NBA champion (1971); NBA Most Valuable Player (1964); 12× NBA All-Star (1961–1972); 3× NBA All-Star Game MVP (1961, 1964, 1969); 9× All-NBA First Team (1961–1969); 2× All-NBA Second Team (1970, 1971); NBA Rookie of the Year (1961); 6× NBA assists leader (1961, 1962, 1964–1966, 1969); NBA anniversary team (35th, 50th, 75th); No. 14 retired by Sacramento Kings; No. 1 retired by Milwaukee Bucks; 3× National college player of the year (1958–1960); 3× Consensus first-team All-American (1958–1960); 3× NCAA scoring champion (1958–1960); 3× First-team All-MVC (1958–1960); No. 12 retired by Cincinnati Bearcats; Mr. Basketball USA (1956); Indiana Mr. Basketball (1956); Arthur Ashe Courage Award (2025)

Career NBA statistics
- Points: 26,710 (25.7 ppg)
- Rebounds: 7,804 (7.5 rpg)
- Assists: 9,887 (9.5 apg)
- Stats at NBA.com
- Stats at Basketball Reference
- Basketball Hall of Fame
- FIBA Hall of Fame
- Collegiate Basketball Hall of Fame
Medals
Men's basketball
Representing the United States
Olympic Games
Gold medal – first place	1960 Rome	Team competition
Pan American Games
Gold medal – first place	1959 Chicago	Team competition

Oscar Palmer Robertson (born November 24, 1938), nicknamed "the Big O", is an American former professional basketball player who played for the Cincinnati Royals and Milwaukee Bucks in the National Basketball Association (NBA). As a 12-time All-Star, 11-time member of the All-NBA Team, and winner of the 1964 MVP, Robertson is considered to be one of the greatest point guards of all time. In 1962, he became the first player in NBA history to average a triple-double for a season (the only player in history besides Russell Westbrook and Nikola Jokić). In the 1970–71 NBA season, he was a key player on the team that brought the Bucks their first NBA title. His playing career, especially during high school and college, was plagued by racism.

Robertson is a two-time Naismith Memorial Basketball Hall of Fame inductee, having been inducted in 1980 for his individual career, and in 2010 as a member of the 1960 United States men's Olympic basketball team and president of the National Basketball Players Association. Also in 1980, Robertson was named to the NBA 35th Anniversary Team. He was again voted as one of the 50 Greatest Players in NBA History in 1996. The United States Basketball Writers Association (USBWA) renamed their College Player of the Year Award the Oscar Robertson Trophy in his honor in 1998, and he was one of five people chosen to represent the inaugural National Collegiate Basketball Hall of Fame class in 2006. He was ranked as the 36th best American athlete of the 20th century by ESPN. In October 2021, Robertson was honored as one of the league's greatest players of all time by being named to the NBA 75th Anniversary Team.

Robertson was also an integral part of Robertson v. National Basketball Ass'n of 1970. The landmark NBA antitrust suit, which was filed when Robertson was the president of the NBA Players' Association, led to an extensive reform of the league's strict free agency and draft rules and, subsequently, to higher salaries for all players. He was inducted into the FIBA Hall of Fame in 2009.

== Early life ==
Robertson was born into poverty in Charlotte, Tennessee, on November 24, 1938. When he was approximately 18 months old, his parents moved to Indianapolis, Indiana, where he grew up in the segregated housing project of Lockefield Gardens. He preferred to play basketball over baseball, which was more popular in the neighborhood because it was "a poor kids' game". He learned how to shoot by using tennis balls and rags wrapped with rubber bands and tossing them into a peach basket in the back of his family's home.

== High school career ==
Robertson attended Crispus Attucks High School, an all-black high school, where he was coached by Ray Crowe, whose emphasis on a fundamentally sound game had a positive effect on his style of play. As a sophomore in 1954, he starred on an Attucks team that lost in the semi-state finals (state quarterfinals) to eventual state champions Milan, a story that would later be the basis of the 1986 movie Hoosiers. When Robertson was a junior, Crispus Attucks dominated its opposition, going 31–1, and winning the 1955 state championship, the first for any all-black school in the nation. It was also the first state championship won by an Indianapolis team in the Hoosier tournament.

In his senior season, Robertson scored 24.0 points per game and was named Indiana Mr. Basketball in 1956. His team finished with a 31–0 record and won a second straight IHSAA Men's Basketball Championship, becoming the first team in Indiana to secure a perfect season and compiling a state-record 45 straight victories. After their championship game wins, the team was paraded through town in a regular tradition, but they were then taken to a park outside downtown to continue their celebration, unlike other teams. Robertson stated: "[Officials] thought the blacks were going to tear the town up, and they thought the whites wouldn't like it."

After his graduation that year, Robertson enrolled at the University of Cincinnati.

In 1983, Robertson was inducted into the National High School Hall of Fame.

== College career ==
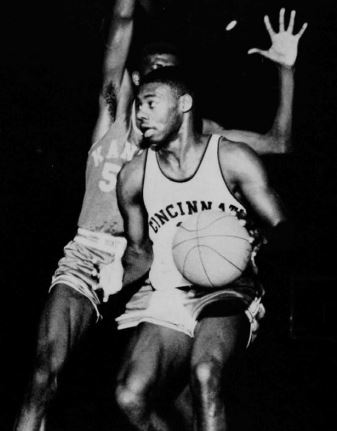
Robertson as a senior at Cincinnati

Robertson continued to excel while playing for the Cincinnati Bearcats, recording a scoring average of 33.8 points per game, the third-highest in college history. In each of his three years, he won the national scoring title, was named a consensus first-team All-American, and was chosen college player of the year, while setting 14 NCAA and 19 school records.

Robertson's stellar play led the Bearcats to a 79–9 overall record during his three varsity seasons, including two Final Four appearances; however, a championship eluded Robertson, something that would become a repeated occurrence until late in his professional career. When Robertson left college, he was the all-time leading NCAA scorer until fellow Hall-of-Fame player Pete Maravich topped him in 1970. Robertson took Cincinnati to national prominence during his time there, but the university's greatest success in basketball took place immediately after his departure, when the team won national titles in 1961 and 1962, missing a third consecutive title in 1963 by just two points. He continues to stand atop the Bearcats' record book and the many records he still holds include points in one game at 62 (one of his six games of 50 points or more), career triple-doubles at 10, career rebounds per game at 15.2, and career points at 2,973.

Robertson had many outstanding individual game performances, including 10 triple-doubles. His personal best may have been his line of 45 points, 23 rebounds, and 10 assists against Indiana State in 1959. Despite his success on the court, Robertson's college career was soured by racism. In those days, Southern university programs such as Kentucky, Duke, and North Carolina did not recruit black athletes, and road trips to segregated cities were especially difficult, with Robertson often sleeping in college dorms instead of hotels. Years later, he told The Indianapolis Star: "I'll never forgive them." Decades after his college days, Robertson's stellar NCAA career was rewarded by the USBWA when they renamed the trophy awarded to the NCAA Division I Player of the Year the Oscar Robertson Trophy in 1998. This honor brought the award full circle for Robertson, as he had won the first two awards ever presented.

== 1960 Olympics ==
After college, Robertson and Jerry West co-captained the 1960 U.S. basketball team at the 1960 Summer Olympics. The team, described as the greatest assemblage of basketball talent ever at that point, steamrolled the competition to win the gold medal. Robertson was a starting forward along with Purdue's Terry Dischinger, but played point guard as well. He was the leading scorer of the team, as the U.S. team won its nine games by an average margin of 42.4 points. Ten of the twelve college players on the American squad later played in the NBA, including Robertson as well as future Basketball Hall-of-Famers West, Jerry Lucas, and Walt Bellamy.

== Professional career ==
=== Cincinnati Royals (1960–1970) ===
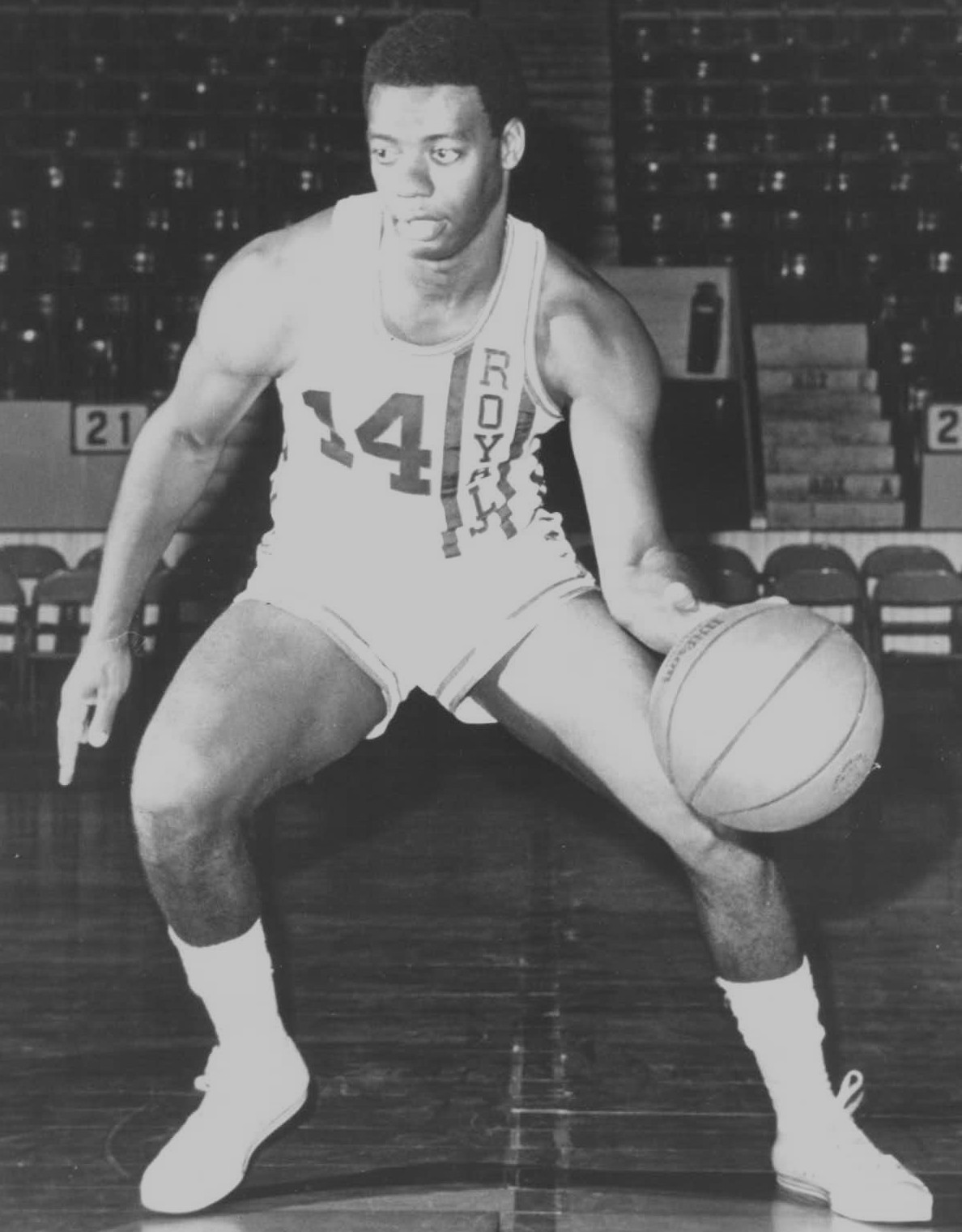
Robertson during his days with the Cincinnati Royals

Prior to the 1960–61 NBA season, Robertson made himself eligible for the 1960 NBA draft. He was drafted by the Cincinnati Royals as a territorial pick. The Royals gave Robertson a $33,000 signing bonus. In his NBA debut, Robertson recorded 21 points, 12 rebounds, and 10 assists in a 140–123 win over the visiting Lakers. On November 15, 1960, Robertson recorded a then-career-high of 44 points to go along with 15 rebounds and 11 assists in a 124–115 win over the Philadelphia Warriors. In his rookie season, Robertson averaged 30.5 points, 10.1 rebounds, and 9.7 assists (leading the league), almost averaging a triple-double for the entire season. He was named NBA Rookie of the Year, was elected into the All-NBA First Team—which would happen in each of Robertson's first nine seasons—and made the first of 12 consecutive All-Star Game appearances. In addition, he was named the 1961 NBA All-Star Game MVP following his 23-point, 14-assist, 9-rebound performance in a West victory; however, the Royals finished with a 33–46 record and stayed in the cellar of the Western Division. On February 10, 1962, Robertson recorded 32 points, 21 rebounds, and 16 assists in a 134–118 win over the Hawks.

In the 1961–62 season, Robertson became the first player in NBA history to average a triple-double for an entire season, with 30.8 points, 12.5 rebounds and 11.4 assists. Robertson also set a then-NBA record for the most triple-doubles during the regular season with 41 triple-doubles; the record would stand for over half a century until 2016–17, when Russell Westbrook recorded 42 and joined Robertson as the only other player to average a triple-double for an entire season. He broke the assists record by Bob Cousy, who had recorded 715 assists two seasons earlier, by logging 899, and joined Johnny Green and Elgin Baylor as the only players in NBA history with the height of 6'5 or smaller to have grabbed 900+ rebounds in a season. The Royals earned a berth to the 1962 NBA playoffs; however, they were eliminated in the first round by the Detroit Pistons. In the 1962–63 season, Robertson further established himself as one of the greatest players of his generation, averaging 28.3 points, 10.4 rebounds and 9.5 assists, narrowly missing out on another triple-double season. The Royals advanced to the Eastern Division Finals, but succumbed in a seven-game series against a Boston Celtics team led by Bill Russell.

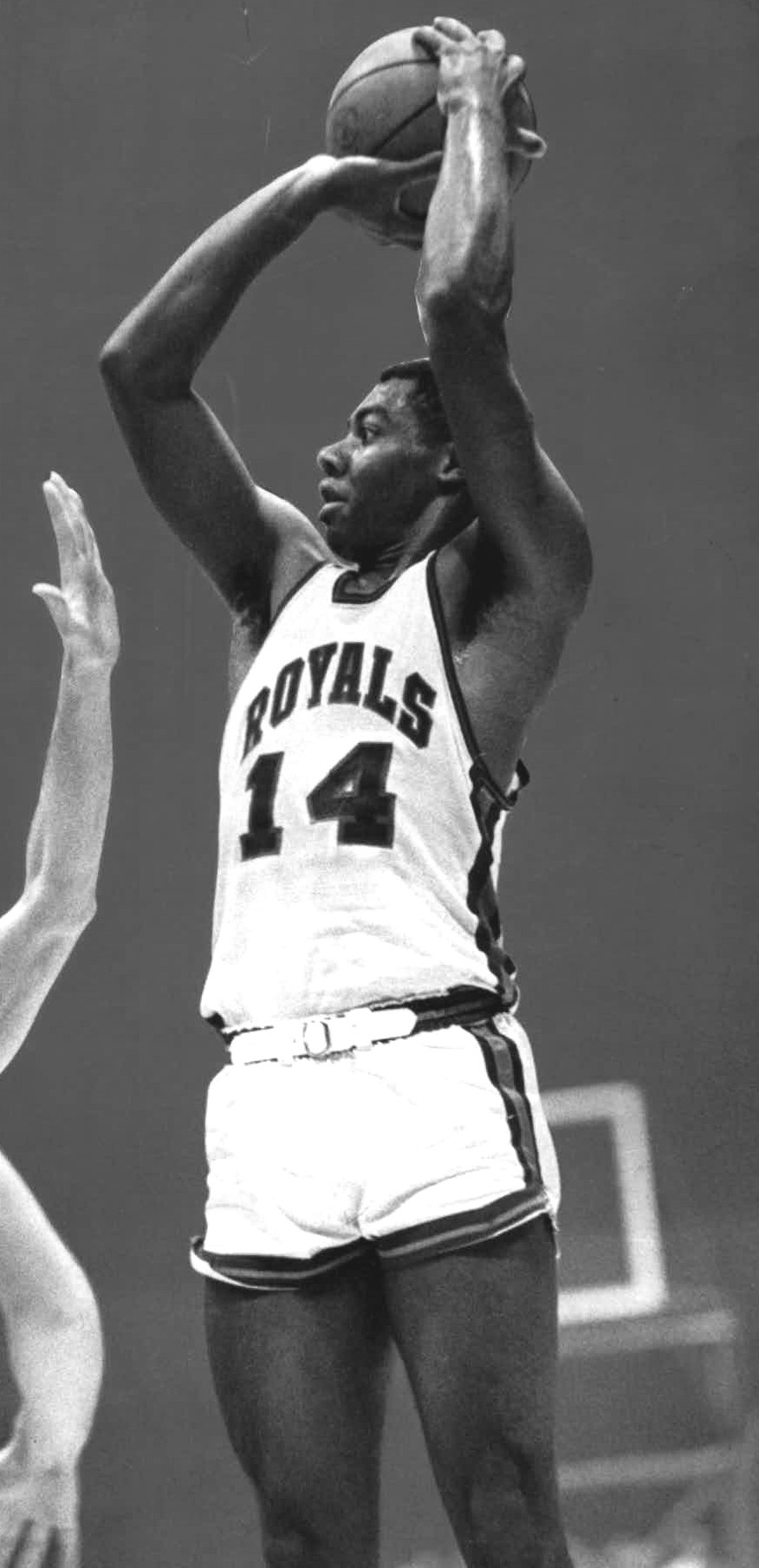
Robertson in 1966

In the 1963–64 season, the Royals achieved a 55–25 record, which put them second place in the Eastern Division. Under new coach Jack McMahon, Robertson flourished. Robertson led the NBA in free-throw percentage, scored a career-high 31.4 points per game, and averaged 9.9 rebounds and 11.0 assists per game. He won the NBA MVP award and became the only player other than Bill Russell and Wilt Chamberlain to win it from 1960 to 1968. Robertson also won his second All-Star Game MVP award that year after scoring 26 points, grabbing 14 rebounds, and dishing off 8 assists in an East victory. In the 1964 NBA playoffs, the Royals defeated the Philadelphia 76ers, but then were dominated by the Celtics 4 games to 1.

Robertson averaged a triple-double over his first five seasons in the NBA with the Royals, recording averages of 30.3 points, 10.4 rebounds, and 10.6 assists per game in 451 contests. On December 18, 1964, Robertson recorded a career-high 56 points on 17-for-33 shooting from the field, to go along with 9 rebounds and 12 assists in a 111–107 win over the Los Angeles Lakers. From the 1964–65 season on, things began to turn sour for the franchise. Despite Robertson recording averages of at least 24.7 points, 6.0 rebounds and 8.1 assists in the six following seasons, the Royals were eliminated in the first round from 1965 to 1967, then missed the playoffs from 1968 to 1970. In the 1969–70 season, the sixth disappointing season in a row, fan support was waning. To help attract the public, 41-year-old head coach Bob Cousy made a short comeback as a player. For seven games, the former Celtics point guard partnered with Robertson in the Royals' backcourt, but they missed the playoffs.

=== Milwaukee Bucks (1970–1974) ===
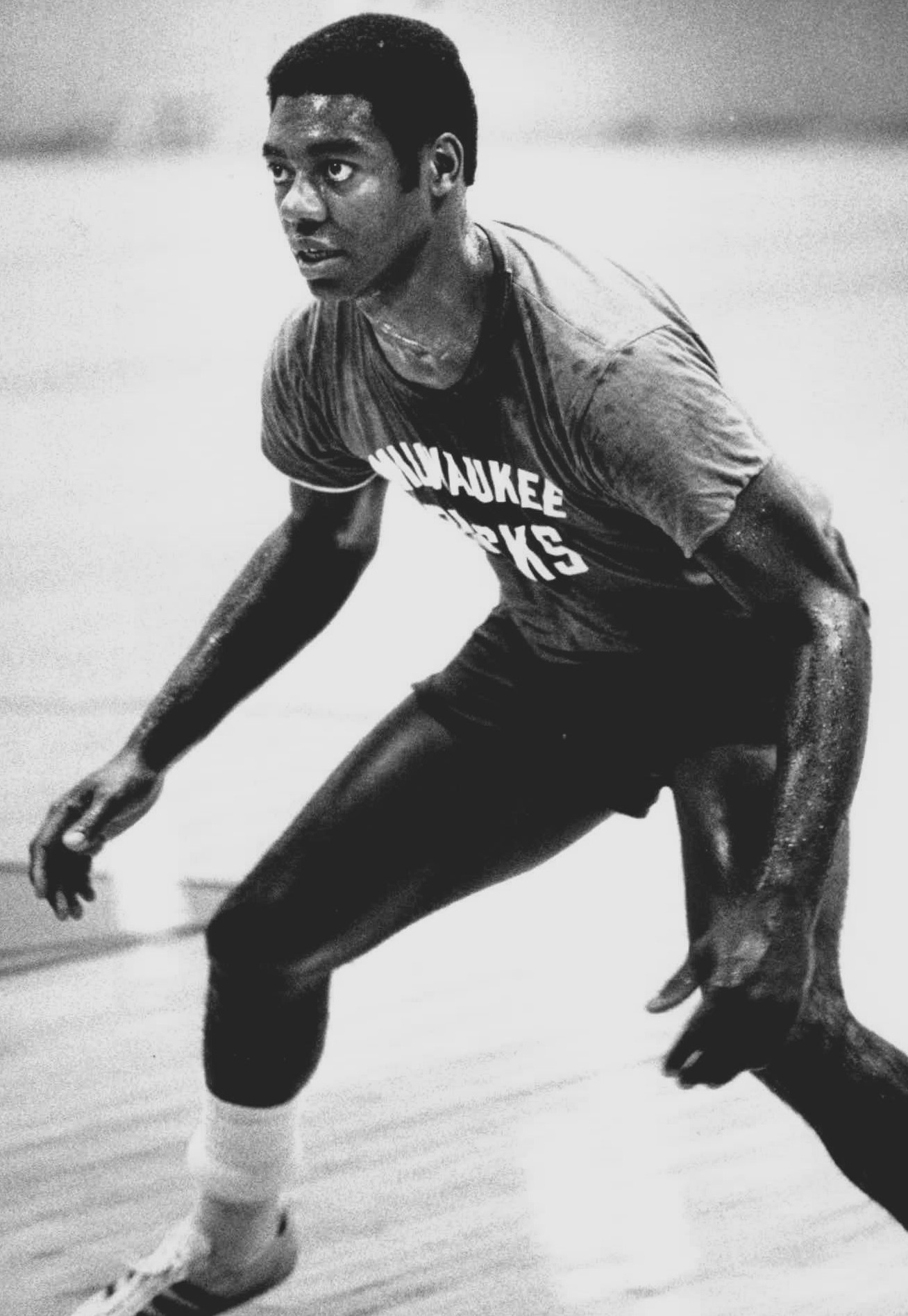
Robertson as a member of the Milwaukee Bucks

Prior to the 1970–71 season, the Royals stunned the basketball world by trading Robertson to the Bucks for Flynn Robinson and Charlie Paulk. No reasons were officially given, but many pundits suspected head coach Bob Cousy was jealous of all the attention Robertson was getting. Robertson himself said: "I think he was wrong and I will never forget it."

The relationship between Oscar and the Royals had soured to the point that Cincinnati had also approached the Lakers and Knicks about deals involving their star player; the Knicks players who were discussed in those scenarios are unknown, but Los Angeles stated publicly that the Royals asked about Jerry West and Wilt Chamberlain, with the Lakers saying they would not consider trading either star. Upon arriving in Milwaukee, Robertson switched from his previous No. 14 jersey to No. 1, which he later explained was because Jon McGlocklin already wore No. 14 and Robertson refused to allow him to give the number up, and Greg Smith wore No. 4, so Robertson took No. 1 as the remaining digit. The trade proved highly beneficial for Robertson. After being stuck with an under-performing team the last six years, he now was paired with the young Lew Alcindor, who would years later become the all-time NBA scoring leader as Kareem Abdul-Jabbar. With Alcindor in the low post and Robertson running the backcourt, the Bucks charged to a league-best 66–16 record, including a then-record 20-game win streak, a dominating 12–2 record in the 1971 NBA playoffs, and crowned their season with the NBA title by sweeping the Baltimore Bullets 4–0 in the 1971 NBA Finals. In his first NBA Finals game, Robertson recorded 22 points, 7 rebounds and 7 assists for the Bucks. For the first time in his career, Robertson had won an NBA championship.

From a historical perspective, Robertson's most important contribution was made not on a basketball court but in a court of law. It was the year of the landmark Robertson v. National Basketball Ass'n, an antitrust suit filed by the NBA's Players Association against the league. As Robertson was the president of the Players Association, the case bore his name. In this suit, the proposed merger between the NBA and American Basketball Association was delayed until 1976, and the college draft, as well as the free agency clauses, were reformed. Robertson himself stated that the main reason was that clubs basically owned their players: players were forbidden to talk to other clubs once their contract was up, because free agency did not exist until 1988. Six years after the suit was filed, the NBA finally reached a settlement, the ABA–NBA merger took place, and the Oscar Robertson suit encouraged signing of more free agents and eventually led to higher salaries for all players.

On the hardwood, the veteran Robertson still proved he was a valuable player. Paired with Abdul-Jabbar, two more division titles with the Bucks followed in the 1971–72 and 1972–73 season. In Robertson's last season, he helped lead Milwaukee to a league-best 59–23 record and helped them to reach the 1974 NBA Finals. There, Robertson had the chance to end his stellar career with a second ring. The Bucks were matched up against a Boston Celtics team powered by an inspired Dave Cowens, and the Bucks lost in seven games. As a testament to Robertson's importance to the Bucks, in the season following his retirement the Bucks fell to last place in their division with a 38–44 record in spite of the continued presence of Abdul-Jabbar.

In 1995, Robertson was elected to the Wisconsin Athletic Hall of Fame.

=== Post-playing career ===
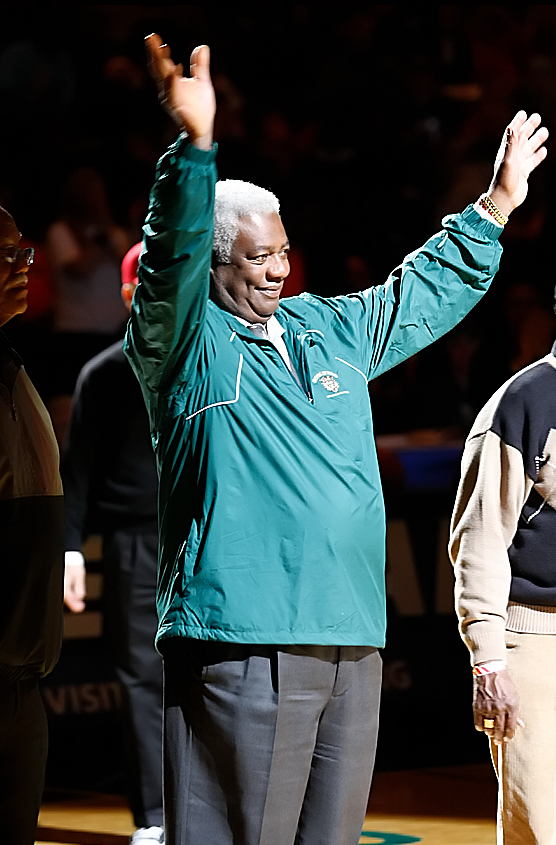
Robertson in 2010

After he retired as an active player, Robertson stayed involved in efforts to improve living conditions in his native Indianapolis, especially concerning African-Americans. In addition, he worked as a color commentator with Brent Musburger on games televised by CBS during the 1974–75 NBA season. His trademark expressions were, "Oh, my!" and "Oh, Brent, did you see that!" in reaction to flashy or spectacular plays. He also returned to the booth for the 1988–89 season calling games on TBS with Hot Rod Hundley.

After his retirement, the Kansas City Kings (the Royals moved there while Robertson was with the Bucks) retired his No. 14; the retirement continues to be honored by the Kings in their current home of Sacramento. The Bucks also retired the No. 1 he wore in Milwaukee. In 1994, a nine-foot bronze statue of Robertson was erected outside the Fifth Third Arena at Shoemaker Center, the current home of Cincinnati Bearcats basketball. Robertson attends many of the games there, viewing the Bearcats from a chair at courtside. In 2006, the statue was relocated to the entrance of the Richard E. Lindner Athletics Center at the University of Cincinnati.

Starting in 2000, Robertson served as a director for Countrywide Financial Corporation, until the company's sale to Bank of America in 2008. In July 2004, Robertson was named interim head coach of the Cincinnati Bearcats men's basketball team for approximately a month while head coach Bob Huggins served a suspension stemming from a drunk-driving conviction.

After many years out of the spotlight, Robertson was recognized on November 17, 2006, for his impact on college basketball when he was chosen to be a member of the founding class of the National Collegiate Basketball Hall of Fame. He was one of five people, along with John Wooden, Bill Russell, Dean Smith, and James Naismith, selected to represent the inaugural class. In January 2011, Robertson joined a class action lawsuit against the NCAA, O'Bannon v. NCAA, challenging the organization's use of the images of its former student athletes.

In 2015, Robertson was among a group of investors that placed a marijuana legalization initiative on the Ohio ballot. The initiative sought exclusive grow rights for the group members while prohibiting all other cultivation except small amounts for personal use. Robertson appeared in a television advertisement advocating for passage of the initiative, but it was ultimately defeated. Second efforts by groups in Ohio succeeded in 2023.

== Legacy ==
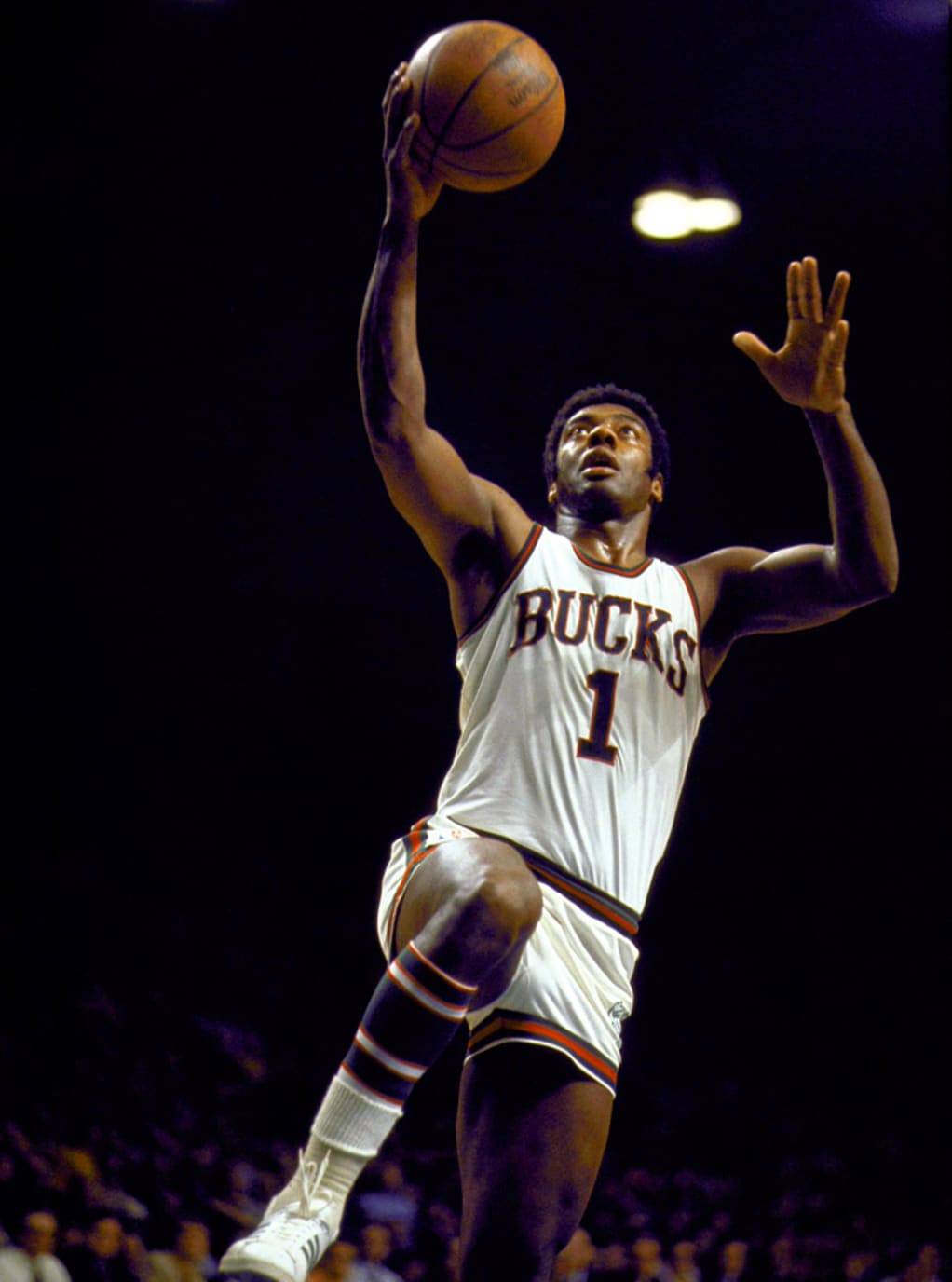
Robertson with the Bucks in 1971

Robertson is regarded as one of the greatest players in NBA history, a triple threat who could score inside, outside and also was a stellar playmaker. His rookie scoring average of 30.5 points per game is the third-highest of any rookie in NBA history, and Robertson averaged more than 30 points per game in six of his first seven seasons. Only three other players in the NBA have had more 30+-point-per-game seasons in their career. Robertson was the first player to average more than 10 assists per game, doing so at a time when the criteria for assists were more stringent than today. Robertson is also the first guard in NBA history to ever average more than 10 rebounds per game, doing so three times. It was a feat that would not be repeated until Russell Westbrook managed to achieve it during the 2016–17 season. In addition to his 1964 regular-season MVP award, Robertson won three All-Star Game MVPs in his career (in 1961, 1964, and 1969). He ended his career with 26,710 points (25.7 per game, ninth-highest all time), 9,887 assists (9.5 per game), and 7,804 rebounds (7.5 per game). He led the league in assists six times; at the time of his retirement, he was the NBA's all-time leader in career assists and free throws made, and was the second all-time leading scorer behind Wilt Chamberlain.

Robertson also set yardsticks in versatility. If his first five NBA seasons are strung together, Robertson averaged a triple-double over those, averaging 30.3 points, 10.4 rebounds, and 10.6 assists. For his career, Robertson had 181 triple-doubles, a record that had never been approached for decades until by Westbrook in the 2020-21 season. These numbers are even more astonishing if it is taken into account that the three-point shot, which benefits sharpshooting backcourt players, did not exist when he played. In the 1967–68 season, Robertson became the first of only two players in NBA history to lead the league in both scoring average and assists per game in the same season (also achieved by Nate Archibald). The official scoring and assist titles went to other players that season because the NBA based the titles on point and assist totals (not averages) prior to the 1969–70 season. During his career, Robertson won a total of six NBA assist titles, and was the first to reach the 7,000, 8,000, and 9,000 career assist milestones. For his career, Robertson shot a high .485 field goal average and led the league in free-throw percentage twice—in the 1963–64 and 1967–68 seasons.

Standing 6 ft 5 in (1.96 m), Robertson is recognized by the NBA as the first legitimate "big guard", paving the way for other oversized backcourt players like Los Angeles Lakers legend Magic Johnson. Furthermore, he is also credited with having invented the head fake and the fadeaway jump shot, a shot which Michael Jordan later became famous for. For the Cincinnati Royals, now relocated and named the Sacramento Kings, he scored 22,009 points and 7,731 assists, and is the all-time leader in both statistics for the combined Royals/Kings teams.

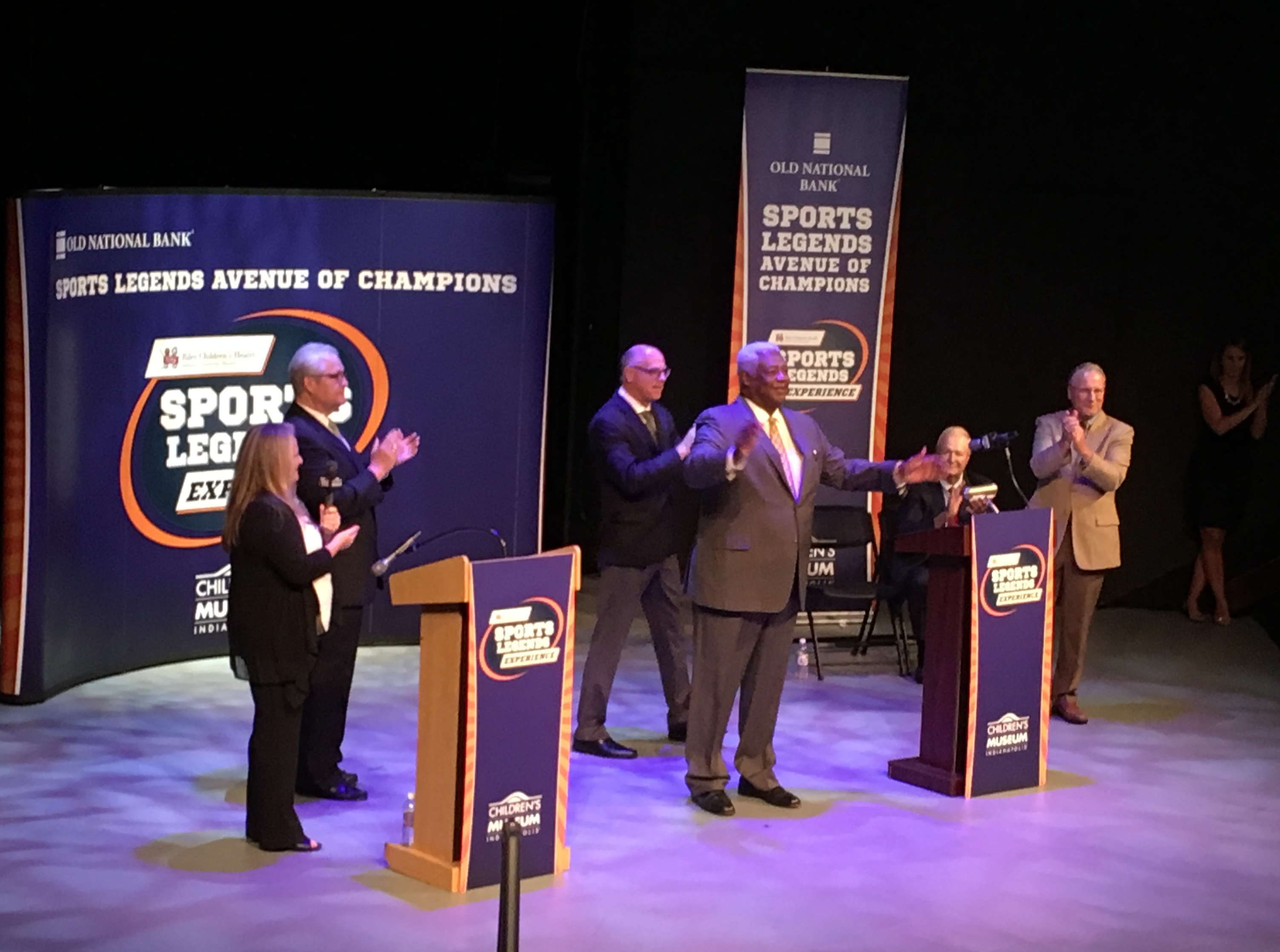
Robertson at the ceremony announcing inclusion in the Old National Bank Sports Legends Avenue of Champions at The Children's Museum of Indianapolis

Robertson was enshrined in the Naismith Memorial Basketball Hall of Fame on April 28, 1980. On October 30, 1980, Robertson was named to the NBA 35th Anniversary Team. In 1996, Robertson was honored as one of the league's greatest players of all time by being named to the NBA 50th Anniversary Team. He received the "Player of the Century" award by the National Association of Basketball Coaches in 2000 and was ranked third on SLAM's "Top 75 NBA Players" in 2003, behind fellow NBA legends Jordan and Chamberlain. Furthermore, in 2006, ESPN named Robertson the second greatest point guard of all time, praising him as the best post-up guard of all time and placing him only behind Johnson. In 2022, to commemorate the NBA's 75th Anniversary The Athletic ranked their top 75 players of all time, and named Robertson as the 12th greatest player in NBA history. He was the second highest ranked point guard on the list again behind only Johnson. In 2017, it was announced that a life-sized bronze sculpture of Robertson would be featured alongside other Indiana sports stars at The Children's Museum of Indianapolis' Old National Bank Sports Legends Avenue of Champions, located in the museum's sports park. In 2018, he received the NBA Lifetime Achievement Award. In October 2021, Robertson was honored as one of the league's greatest players of all time by being named to the NBA 75th Anniversary Team.

In 1959, the Player of the Year Award was established to recognize the best college basketball player of the year by the U.S. Basketball Writers Association. Five nominees are presented and the individual with the most votes receives the award during the NCAA Final Four. In 1998, it was renamed the Oscar Robertson Trophy in his honor, as the player that won the first two awards, because of his outstanding career and his continuing efforts to promote the game of basketball. In 2004, an 18" bronze statue of Robertson was sculpted by world-renowned sculptor Harry Weber. In 2022, the NBA renamed its Western Conference championship trophy after Robertson. In 2024, NBA Commissioner Adam Silver announced that the league had commissioned a statue of Robertson from sculptor Ryan Feeney to be permanently placed at Crispus Attucks High School.

== Awards and honors ==
NBA

- NBA champion: 1971
- NBA Most Valuable Player: 1964
- 12× NBA All-Star: 1961–1972
- 3× NBA All-Star Game MVP: 1961, 1964, 1969
- 11x All-NBA Team selections:
  - 9× First Team: 1961–1969
  - 2× Second Team: 1970, 1971
- NBA Rookie of the Year: 1961
- 6× NBA assists leader: 1961, 1962, 1964–1966, 1969
- 2× NBA free-throw percentage leader: 1964, 1968
- NBA minutes played leader: 1965
- NBA 35th Anniversary Team (1980)
- 50 Greatest Players in NBA History (1996)
- NBA 75th Anniversary Team (2021)
- No. 14 retired by Sacramento Kings
- No. 1 retired by Milwaukee Bucks

NCAA

- 3× National college player of the year: 1958–1960
- 3× Consensus first-team All-American: 1958–1960
- 3× NCAA scoring champion: 1958–1960
- 3× First-team All-MVC: 1958–1960
- No. 12 retired by Cincinnati Bearcats

USA Basketball

- Olympic gold medalist: 1960
- Pan American Games: gold medalist: 1959

== NBA career statistics ==
Legend
GP	Games played	GS	Games started	MPG	Minutes per game
FG%	Field goal percentage	3P%	3-point field goal percentage	FT%	Free throw percentage
RPG	Rebounds per game	APG	Assists per game	SPG	Steals per game
BPG	Blocks per game	PPG	Points per game	**Bold**	Career high
†	Won an NBA championship	*	Led the league

=== Regular season ===
Year	Team	GP	GS	MPG	FG%	FT%	RPG	APG	SPG	BPG	PPG
1960–61	Cincinnati	71		42.7	.473	.822	10.1	9.7*			30.5
1961–62	Cincinnati	79		44.3	.478	.803	**12.5**	11.4*			30.8
1962–63	Cincinnati	80*		44.0	**.518**	.810	10.4	9.5			28.3
1963–64	Cincinnati	79		45.1	.483	.853*	9.9	11.0*			**31.4**
1964–65	Cincinnati	75		45.6*	.480	.839	9.0	**11.5***			30.4
1965–66	Cincinnati	76		**46.0**	.475	.842	7.7	11.1*			31.3
1966–67	Cincinnati	79		43.9	.493	**.873**	6.2	10.7			30.5
1967–68	Cincinnati	65		42.5	.500	**.873***	6.0	9.7*			29.2*
1968–69	Cincinnati	79		43.8	.486	.838	6.4	9.8*			24.7
1969–70	Cincinnati	69		41.5	.511	.809	6.1	8.1			25.3
1970–71†	Milwaukee	**81**		39.4	.496	.850	5.7	8.2			19.4
1971–72	Milwaukee	64		37.3	.472	.836	5.0	7.7			17.4
1972–73	Milwaukee	73		37.5	.454	.847	4.9	7.5			15.5
1973–74	Milwaukee	70		35.4	.438	.835	4.0	6.4	1.1	.1	12.7
Career		1,040		42.2	.485	.838	7.5	9.5	1.1	.1	25.7
All-Star		12	10	31.7	.512	.714	5.8	6.8			20.5

=== Playoffs ===
Year	Team	GP	MPG	FG%	FT%	RPG	APG	SPG	BPG	PPG
1962	Cincinnati	4	46.3	**.519**	.795	11.0	11.0			28.8
1963	Cincinnati	12	47.5	.470	.864	**13.0**	9.0			**31.8**
1964	Cincinnati	10	47.1	.455	.858	8.9	8.4			29.3
1965	Cincinnati	4	**48.8**	.427	**.923**	4.8	**12.0**			28.0
1966	Cincinnati	5	44.8	.408	.897	7.6	7.8			**31.8**
1967	Cincinnati	4	45.8	.516	.892	4.0	11.3			24.8
1971†	Milwaukee	14	37.1	.486	.754	5.0	8.9			18.3
1972	Milwaukee	11	34.5	.407	.833	5.8	7.5			13.1
1973	Milwaukee	6	42.7	.500	.912	4.7	7.5			21.2
1974	Milwaukee	**16**	43.1	.450	.846	3.4	9.3	.9	.3	14.0
Career		86	42.7	.460	.855	6.7	8.9	.9	.3	22.2

== Personal life ==
Robertson is the son of Mazell and Bailey Robertson. He has two brothers, Bailey Jr. and Henry. He remembers a tough childhood, plagued by poverty and racism. When a biography was going to be written about him in the 1990s, Robertson joked that his life had been "dull" and that he had been "married to the same woman for a long time". In 1997, Robertson donated one of his kidneys to his daughter Tia, who suffered lupus-related kidney failure. He has been an honorary spokesman for the National Kidney Foundation ever since. In 2003, he published his own autobiography, The Big O: My Life, My Times, My Game. Robertson also owns the chemical company Orchem, based in Cincinnati, Ohio.

Regarding basketball, Robertson has stated that legendary Harlem Globetrotters players Marques Haynes and "clown prince" Goose Tatum were his idols. In his eighties, he still follows basketball on TV and attends most home games for the University of Cincinnati, his alma mater. He lists woodworking as his prime hobby. Robertson adds that he still could average a triple-double season in today's basketball and that he is highly skeptical that anyone else could do it; it was later done by Russell Westbrook, whose first of four seasons doing so was the 2016–17 season. On June 9, 2007, Oscar received an Honorary Doctorate of Humane Letters from the University of Cincinnati for both his philanthropic and entrepreneurial efforts. He is also a member of the Beta Eta chapter of Kappa Alpha Psi fraternity.

In February 2012, Robertson had surgery to remove prostate cancer at Florida Hospital Celebration Health, it was performed by Vipul Patel. In August 2018, Robertson auctioned off his 1971 championship ring, Hall of Fame ring, and one of his Milwaukee Bucks game jerseys. Each item sold between $50,000 and $91,000. On July 20, 2021, on the eve of the Bucks winning their second championship and first since his tenure, Robertson wrote a piece in The Players' Tribune voicing his support for Giannis Antetokounmpo and the Bucks.

== See also ==
- List of NBA career scoring leaders
- List of NBA career assists leaders
- List of NBA career free throw scoring leaders
- List of NBA career minutes played leaders
- List of NBA career triple-double leaders
- List of NBA career playoff assists leaders
- List of NBA career playoff triple-double leaders
- List of NBA annual minutes leaders
- List of NBA franchise career scoring leaders
- List of NBA longest winning streaks
- List of NBA single-game assists leaders
- List of NBA rookie single-season scoring leaders
- List of NCAA Division I men's basketball career free throw scoring leaders
- List of NCAA Division I men's basketball players with 2000 points and 1000 rebounds
- List of NCAA Division I men's basketball players with 60 or more points in a game
