= Mark Tatum =

American sports executive (born 1969)

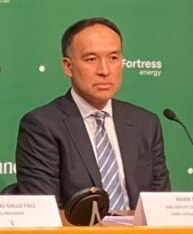
- Tatum in 2022

Deputy Commissioner of the NBA
- Incumbent
- Assumed office February 1, 2014
- Commissioner: Adam Silver
- Preceded by: Adam Silver

President of the WNBA
- Interim
- In office October 2, 2018 – May 15, 2019
- Preceded by: Lisa Borders
- Succeeded by: Cathy Engelbert (as Commissioner)

Personal details
- Born: October 22, 1969 (age 57) Vung Tau, Vietnam
- Education: Cornell University (BS); Harvard University (MBA)

Mark A. Tatum (born October 22, 1969) is an American sports and business executive who is currently serving as the Deputy Commissioner of the National Basketball Association (NBA) under Adam Silver. Additionally, Tatum also currently holds the position of the NBA's chief operating officer. For his work in these capacities, Forbes ranked him at No. 8 on its list of "Most Influential Minorities in Sports". He is of Vietnamese and Jamaican descent.

== Early life ==
Mark Tatum was born in Vung Tau, Vietnam, to Kim and Charlie Tatum on October 22, 1969. His father was born in Jamaica and moved to the United States when he was a teenager; he joined the United States Air Force and was stationed in Vietnam during the Vietnam War when he married Tatum's mother. Tatum and his mother moved with his father when he returned to the United States.

Tatum lived in the East Flatbush neighborhood of Brooklyn. In 1987, Tatum graduated from Brooklyn Technical High School, where he led the Brooklyn Tech baseball team to the New York City public school championship at Yankee Stadium in 1984.

== Career ==
Tatum attended Cornell University, where he played collegiate baseball for the Big Red, was a member of the Quill and Dagger society, and was initiated into the Kappa Alpha Psi fraternity. He graduated in 1991 and earned a bachelor's degree in business management and marketing. He also graduated from Harvard Business School in 1998.

Prior to joining the NBA, Tatum worked as a marketing executive and sales manager for companies such as PepsiCo, Procter & Gamble, and the Clorox Company. His first work as a sports executive came as a member of Major League Baseball's Corporate Sponsorship and Marketing department. He made the move over to the NBA in 1999.

Prior to becoming Deputy Commissioner, he worked as the league's Executive Vice President of Global Marketing Partnerships, where he managed the Business Development and Media groups. In this role, he collaborated with sports marketing executives from the Coca-Cola Company, Anheuser-Busch InBev, Adidas, and Nike, among others, being in charge of NBA-themed promotions and advertising. He also negotiated many of the NBA's television deals with many networks (including ABC/ESPN and TNT). On February 1, 2014, Tatum was unanimously appointed Deputy Commissioner and chief operating officer by the NBA Board of Governors.

Since then, he has continued his work in promoting and advertising the NBA, both domestically and internationally. As head of the league's business operations, he currently oversees the NBA G League, as well as global partnerships, marketing, and communications. He has been praised for his key role in the NBA's recent success abroad, particularly in China.

As Adam Silver's deputy commissioner, Tatum also holds the duty of announcing second-round picks in the annual NBA draft, as well as hosting the NBA draft lottery. He is also the league's representative in the FIBA Central Board. At the conclusion of the 2022 NBA Finals, he presented the Bill Russell MVP Trophy to Stephen Curry, and the Larry O'Brien Trophy to the championship team, the Golden State Warriors as Commissioner Silver was unable to do so as a result of being in COVID protocol.
