= NBA dress code =

Dress code for National Basketball Association

The National Basketball Association's (NBA) dress code was introduced on October 17, 2005, under NBA commissioner David Stern. The dress code was mandatory for all NBA and NBA Development League players, making the NBA only the second major professional sports league to have a dress code, after the National Hockey League. The dress code went into effect at the start of the 2005–06 NBA season. It was significantly relaxed shortly before the 2020 NBA Bubble.

== Details ==
The dress code stated that all players must dress in business or conservative attire while arriving and departing during a scheduled game, on the bench while injured, and when conducting official NBA business (press interviews, charity events, etc.). The first dress code banned fashions most often associated with hip-hop culture, specifically: jerseys, jeans, hats, durags, T-shirts, large jewelry, sneakers and hiking boots (specifically, Timberland-type boots). Under current NBA dress regulations, if a player does not dress to participate in a game, he must dress in a manner suitable for a coach.

In the NBA, a suit or a sport coat used to be required for coaches, as well as a necktie, however starting with the 2020 NBA Bubble coaches were permitted to wear team-issued polos, quarter-zips, sweatpants, or jogging pants.

Banned clothing was not allowed to be worn by players to interviews, games (on and off the bench), charity events, or any other occasion affiliated with the NBA and its developmental league. Violators of the dress code were to be fined or suspended upon repeat offenses.

With Stern stepping down and Adam Silver becoming commissioner of the NBA in 2014, the dress code became more lenient, allowing players to be more expressive with what they wear.

== Support ==
The dress code was announced as a direct consequence of the Malice at the Palace, as the NBA sought to undo its image problems, which were hurting its business. In 2019, Stern said that the National Basketball Players Association (NBPA), the labor union representing NBA players, originally supported the idea of a dress code, although the NBPA then attacked Stern after he announced the dress code. Charles Barkley, in a 2005 interview on The Tonight Show with Jay Leno, conceded that there were racial overtones with the new dress code, but he generally supported it. Barkley said that bosses at all businesses are entitled to enact dress codes, and that athletes influence young fans.

Writing for Rolling Stone in 2016, Zack Graham said that although players were initially critical of the dress code, "Over the years, NBA players accepted, then embraced and eventually began to have fun with the new dress code, changing men's fashion in the process." This was also seen as a business opportunity, as NBA superstars often wanted to be the first to sport the newest fashion trends, with some collaborating with fashion houses to create collections. Consequently, numerous official NBA events, including press conferences, were being viewed as catwalks. Younger players, however, disliked the pressure to wear similarly expensive fashions as top players.

== Opposition ==
Critics such as Allen Iverson, Stephen Jackson and Paul Pierce claimed that the dress code would not change a person's character regardless of what type of clothing they wore, and that associating hip-hop style of dress with crime or a bad image is racist. Allen Iverson, well-known for his tattoos, du-rags, and chains was seen as the main target in the change in dress code. Iverson said, "the dress code is not who I am and doesn't allow me to express myself." Rod Benson wrote that, as a prospect in the D-League in 2006, the dress code created a financial burden for him.

Many NBA and non-NBA sports figures also claimed that it targeted young black males and hip-hop culture. Many NBA players are sponsored by rappers and casual wear brands such as Nike, Adidas, Puma and Converse.

The NBA's policy change was widely seen as a critique of Black culture and represented the NBA's discomfort with any hip-hop aesthetics - a key component to NBA culture and fashion. Many protested the NBA policy change and felt that Allen Iverson was the center of this attack. Iverson was famously known for his tattoos, braids, hip-hop style, and expressive outfits prior to games.

In an interview done with Allen Iverson, Iverson stated, "David Stern and the rest of the NBA were like, 'No,' because it was all right when I was doing it," Iverson recalled. "But then everyone else said, 'OK, if he can do that, we can do this.' You see Kobe coming in with diamond chains and baggy clothes, and everyone started doing it. Then the league was like, ‘Hold on, we’ve got to do something about that.'"

While the NBA fashion policy change was put into place to discourage players from wearing expressive outfits and to reshape the views on the NBA, it ultimately created a fashion renaissance and instead, reshaped the world of fashion, not just in the NBA.

== NBA Remarks ==
Following the input of the NBA dress code, SLAM reached out to the NBA regarding the new rule. Specifically asking, "There's lots of conversation in our office this am, as well on social media, about whether or not the NBA still has an official dress code. Is there any official word from the League?" In response to SLAM's question, the NBA replied after a long six hours, simply stating, "Yes, we have a dress code."

== Pregame Fits ==
After the enactment of the NBA dress code, while there was protest and opposition to the league's decision, players began embracing the new policy and found new and creative ways to personalize their outfits in ways that allowed them to express themselves without violating the restrictive policy. What once restricted players turned into a new culture in the NBA. Players began wearing "pregame fits," and it became a competition between players on who and which team could dress best.

The 2005 NBA dress code policy has continued into 2025, where players wear colorful suits and carry extravagant bags. While NBA fits were once frowned upon, those same fits have become NBA fashion and a significant part of NBA culture. Players like Shai Gilegeous-Alexander, Jared McCain, and Devin Booker have all become fashion icons. Social media has made the praise of NBA fashion more widespread than ever, with accounts dedicated to posting a player's arrival or departure outfits. Accounts like @leaguefits and @nbafashionfits on Instagram have amplified NBA fashion and allowed for instantaneous celebration across platforms.

Many smaller brands utilize NBA players as a marketing tactic for their products. Brands have been able to grow rapidly through partnering with NBA players and suiting them up for game days.
