= J. Walter Kennedy =

American businessman and politician (1912–1977)

2nd Commissioner of the NBA
- In office September 1, 1963 – June 1, 1975
- Preceded by: Maurice Podoloff
- Succeeded by: Larry O'Brien

Mayor of Stamford
- In office December 1, 1959 – August 6, 1963
- Preceded by: Conrad J. Engelke
- Succeeded by: William F. Hickey Jr. (interim)

Personal details
- Born: James Walter Kennedy; June 8, 1912 Stamford, Connecticut, U.S.
- Died: June 26, 1977 (aged 65) Stamford, Connecticut, U.S.
- Resting place: St. Michaels Cemetery, Springdale, Connecticut, U.S.
- Party: Democratic
- Spouse: Marion McRedmond
- Children: 3, including David
- Education: University of Notre Dame
- Profession: Politician; Sports administrator

James Walter Kennedy (June 8, 1912 – June 26, 1977) was an American businessman, politician, and commissioner of the National Basketball Association (NBA) from 1963 until 1975.

== Profile ==
=== Early life ===
James Walter Kennedy was born in Stamford, Connecticut, to Lottie and Michael Kennedy. He contracted polio early in life, which left him with a disability and therefore unable to compete in sports. Nonetheless, he remained a fan and his life and career were devoted to sports, reaching a pinnacle as the NBA commissioner in 1963. A multi-talented individual, Kennedy worked as a high school coach, public relations man and politician. In the late 1930s, he coached teams and was athletic director at St. Basil's Preparatory School in Stamford.

He married Marion McRedmond in 1940 with whom he had three children: David, Robert and Kathleen.

In the 1940s, he returned to Notre Dame, his alma mater, to become its Sports Information Director. He then moved on to the Basketball Association of America as the Public Relations Director, just as the league was merged with the National Basketball League to form the National Basketball Association.

During much of the 1950s, J. Walter Kennedy toured the world with the Harlem Globetrotters as the Publicity Director. He returned home to Stamford and was elected mayor in 1959 before the NBA owners elected him president in 1963. The sports complex at Westhill High School in Stamford is named the J. Walter Kennedy Sports Complex.

=== President/Commissioner of the NBA ===
Succeeding the first president Maurice Podoloff, Kennedy became an iron-handed executive and let everyone know precisely where he stood on issues. Kennedy quickly exerted his authority, slapping Red Auerbach with a $500 fine for rowdy conduct during a pre-season 1963 game. At the time, it was the largest fine ever levied against a coach or player in the NBA. His title was changed to "commissioner" in 1967.

Kennedy was also the commissioner who upheld the first protest ever in the NBA, which was the one filed by the Chicago Bulls for "the Phantom Buzzer Game" against the Atlanta Hawks in 1969.

Kennedy assumed the helm of the NBA when the league was struggling with only nine teams, no television contract, sagging attendance and competition from the American Basketball League (1961–1963). When Kennedy retired as commissioner on May 31, 1975, the league had increased to 18 teams, landed a lucrative television contract and improved its financial standing considerably, experienced a 200 percent boost in income and attendance figures tripled during his tenure. He came to power in the waning days of the ABL, and retired just before the final season of the American Basketball Association.

Walter Kennedy was also instrumental in bringing an annual NBA game to Springfield to benefit the Naismith Memorial Basketball Hall of Fame, where he served on the Hall of Fame's Board of Trustees for 13 years, two of which were spent as the Hall of Fame's President. Kennedy was inducted into the Hall in 1981.

Kennedy was also quite involved in many social causes, including the Special Olympics, National Multiple Sclerosis Society and Boys' Town of Italy. The J. Walter Kennedy Citizenship Award is presented annually to an NBA player or coach for outstanding service and dedication to the community. Past recipients include Julius "Dr J" Erving, Earvin "Magic" Johnson, Bob Lanier, Reggie Miller and Glenn "Doc" Rivers.

=== Death ===
Kennedy died shortly after his 65th birthday in 1977 of liver failure after a brief bout with cancer. He was eulogized by Howard Cosell and his funeral was attended by many athletes and dignitaries, including the Governor of Connecticut Ella Grasso, Willis Reed, NBA commissioner Larry O'Brien and Eunice Kennedy Shriver. He is buried at St. John's Cemetery in the Springdale section of Stamford, Connecticut.

Political offices
Preceded by Conrad J. Engelke	Mayor of Stamford, Connecticut; 1960–1963	Succeeded by William F. Hickey Jr. (interim)
