= William F. Hickey Jr. =

American judge and politician (1929–2016)

Member of the Connecticut State Senate
- In office 1960–1970

Personal details
- Born: May 28, 1929 Stamford, Connecticut, U.S.
- Died: July 21, 2016 (aged 87) Fairfield, Connecticut, U.S.
- Party: Democratic
- Education: Manhattan College; Fordham University School of Law
- Profession: Politician, judge

William F. Hickey Jr. (May 28, 1929 – July 21, 2016) was an American judge and politician.

Born in Stamford, Connecticut, Hickey graduated from Manhattan College in 1952 and Fordham University School of Law in 1955. He served in the Connecticut State Senate from 1960 to 1970 and was a Democrat. In 1963, Hickey also served as interim mayor of Stamford, Connecticut for three months. Hickey served as a Connecticut Superior Court judge and then an administrative judge. From 1979 to 2004, Hickey lived with his family in New Canaan, Connecticut. Hickey died at his home in Fairfield, Connecticut.
