= Adam Silver =

American lawyer and NBA commissioner (born 1962)

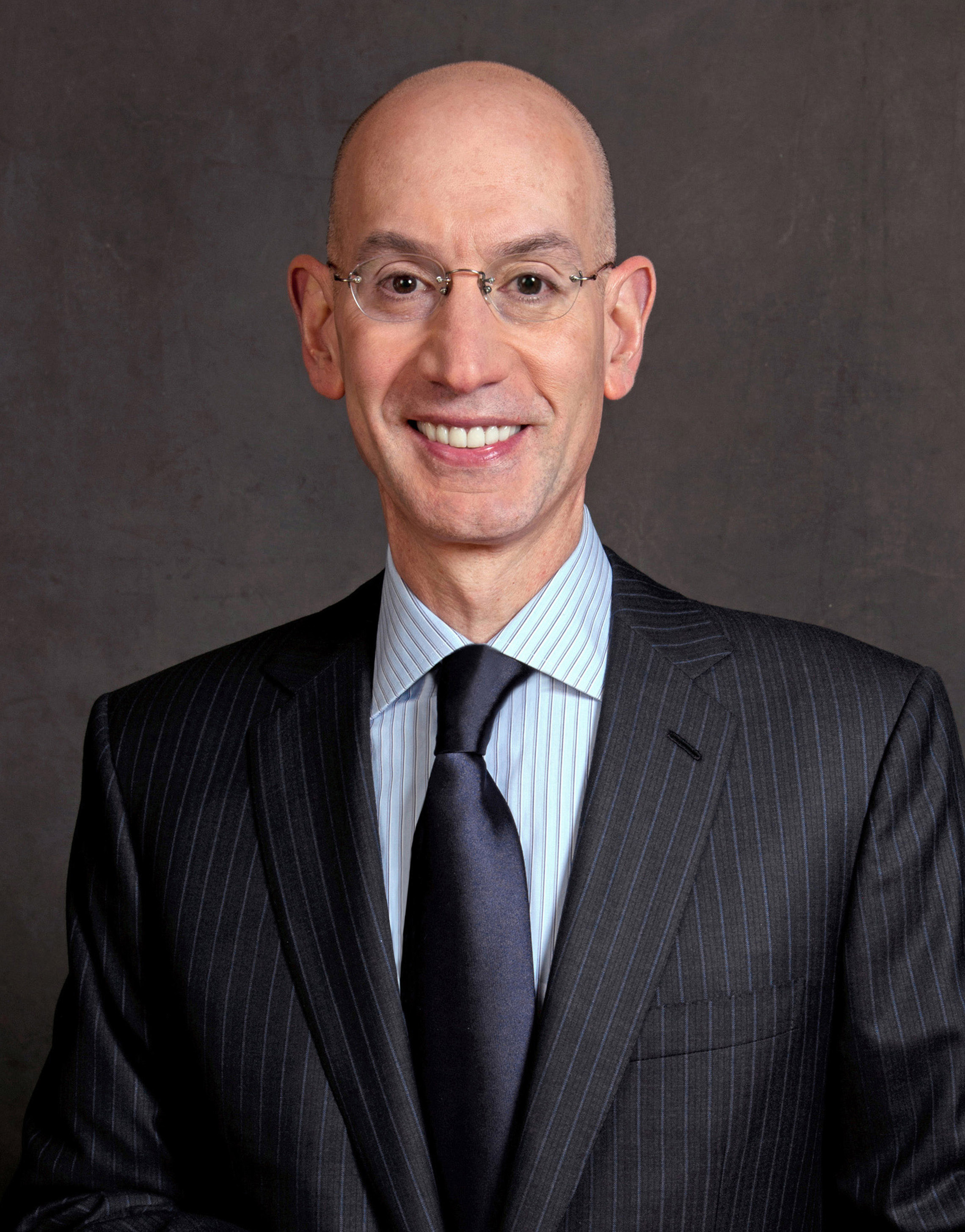
- Official portrait, 2014

5th Commissioner of the NBA
- Incumbent
- Assumed office February 1, 2014
- Deputy: Mark Tatum
- Preceded by: David Stern

Deputy Commissioner of the NBA
- In office July 1, 2006 – February 1, 2014
- Commissioner: David Stern
- Preceded by: Russ Granik
- Succeeded by: Mark Tatum

Personal details
- Born: April 25, 1962 (age 64) Rye, New York, U.S.
- Spouse: Maggie Grise (m. 2015)
- Children: 2
- Education: Duke University (BA); University of Chicago (JD)

Adam Silver (born April 25, 1962) is an American lawyer and sports executive who is serving as the fifth and current commissioner of the National Basketball Association (NBA) since 2014. He joined the NBA in 1992 and has held various positions within the league, becoming chief operating officer and deputy commissioner under his predecessor and mentor David Stern in 2006. When Stern retired in 2014, Silver was named commissioner.

During his tenure, Silver has gained praise for growing the game economically and globally, especially in China. Critics claim the quality of the game has suffered.

Silver made headlines in 2014 for forcing Donald Sterling to sell the Los Angeles Clippers, after banning Sterling for life from all NBA games and events when private recordings of him making racist remarks were made public.

== Early life and education ==
Silver was born into a Jewish-American family. His father Edward Silver (1921–2004) was a lawyer who specialized in labor law and was a senior partner at the law firm Proskauer Rose. Silver grew up in Rye, New York, a northern suburb of New York City in Westchester County. He attended Rye High School and graduated in 1980.

After high school, Silver went to Duke University. He was a member of the Phi Delta Theta fraternity, and graduated in 1984 with a Bachelor of Arts degree in political science. Silver worked from 1984 to 1985 as a legislative aide to Les AuCoin, who was a member of the U.S. House of Representatives. Silver then attended the University of Chicago Law School, graduating in 1988 with a J.D. degree.

After law school, Silver spent a year as a law clerk for Judge Kimba Wood of the U.S. District Court for the Southern District of New York. He then joined the law firm of Cravath, Swaine & Moore as an associate.

== National Basketball Association ==
=== NBA Entertainment ===
Since joining the NBA in 1992, Silver held the position of senior VP and COO of NBA Entertainment working his way up to president and COO, which he held for eight years. During his time with NBA Entertainment, Silver was an executive producer of the IMAX movie Michael Jordan to the Max, as well as the documentary Whatever Happened to Micheal Ray? He contributed to the productions of Like Mike and The Year of the Yao. Silver also approved an idea allowing a documentary crew to follow and film the Chicago Bulls during their 1997–98 season, which was eventually turned into the documentary The Last Dance.

Silver also held the positions of NBA chief of staff and special assistant to the commissioner.

=== NBA deputy commissioner ===
Silver was the NBA's deputy commissioner and chief operating officer for eight years. In that role, he was involved in the negotiation of the league's last three collective bargaining agreements with the National Basketball Players Association, the development of the WNBA and NBA Development League, the partnership with Turner Broadcasting to manage the NBA's digital assets, and the creation of NBA China.

=== NBA commissioner ===
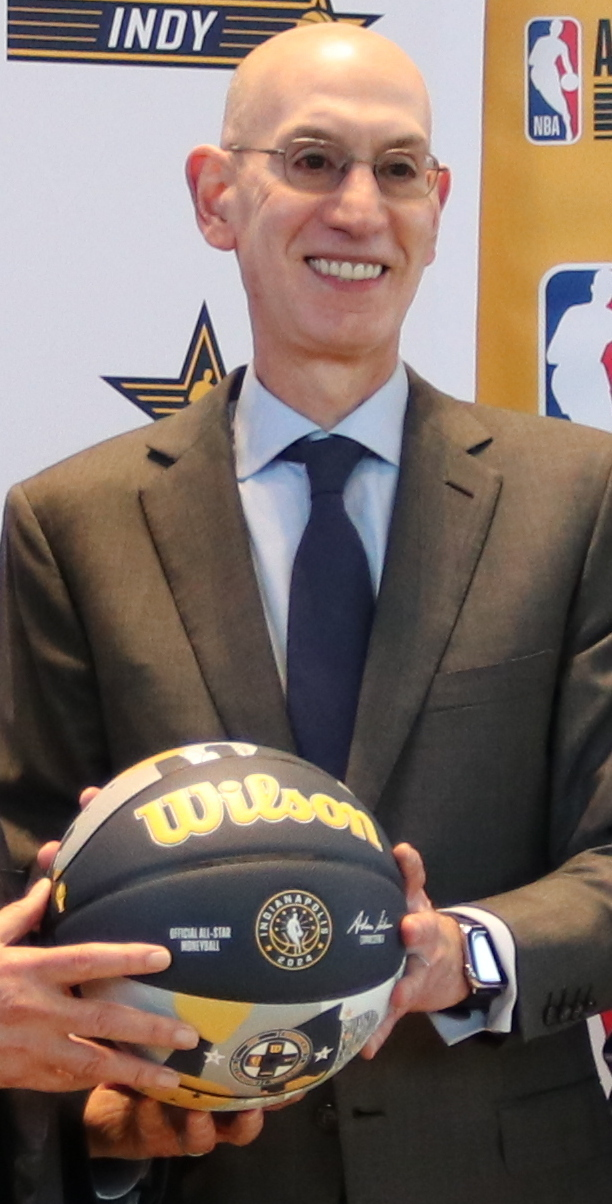
Silver in 2023

On October 25, 2012, NBA commissioner David Stern announced his retirement date and endorsed Silver to succeed him. Shortly after, the NBA Board of Governors unanimously voted in favor of Silver to become the next NBA commissioner. Silver officially assumed the role on February 1, 2014, after Stern stepped down from the position.

On April 25, 2014, TMZ Sports released a video of Los Angeles Clippers owner Donald Sterling holding a conversation with his girlfriend that included racist remarks. Silver responded four days later, announcing that Sterling had been banned from the NBA for life. In addition, Silver fined Sterling $2.5 million, the maximum allowed under the NBA constitution. Silver stripped Sterling from virtually all of his authority over the Clippers, and urged owners to vote to expel Sterling from ownership of the Clippers. Sterling was disallowed from entering any Clippers facility as well as attending any NBA games. It was one of the most severe punishments ever imposed on a professional sports owner.

On November 13, 2014, Silver published an op-ed piece in The New York Times, where he announced that he is in favor of legalized and regulated sports betting, mentioning that it should be "brought out of the underground and into the sunlight where it can be appropriately monitored and regulated."

Dwight Howard, who played for the Houston Rockets at the time, accused Silver of immediately forcing him to remove and apologize for a 2014 "Free Palestine" tweet about the 2014 Gaza War. The NBA, however, has denied this accusation.

On October 4, 2019, Houston Rockets general manager Daryl Morey issued a tweet that supported the 2019–2020 Hong Kong protests. Morey later deleted the tweet. Two days later, Morey and the NBA each issued separate statements addressing the original tweet; Morey said that he never intended his tweet to cause any offense while the NBA said the tweet was "regrettable". The statements drew attention and subsequent bipartisan criticism from several US politicians. On October 7, Silver defended league's response to the tweet, supporting Morey's right to freedom of expression while also accepting the right of reply from the government of and businesses from China. Soon after, Silver faced a rift between the partnership of China and the NBA. China responded negatively with decisions to possibly cut ties from the NBA. Silver publicly said, "It is inevitable that people around the world—including from America and China—will have different viewpoints over different issues. ... It is not the role of the NBA to adjudicate those differences." Chinese smartphone manufacturer Vivo responded to Silver's statements, stating, "Vivo has always insisted on the principle that the national interest is above all else and firmly opposes any remark and behavior that constitutes a challenge to the national sovereignty and territorial integrity. ... Starting today, Vivo will suspend all cooperation with the NBA." The NBA eventually returned to China in 2025 after signing a five-year deal to play two preseason games at Venetian Arena in Macau.

On March 11, 2020, Silver made the decision to suspend the 2019–20 NBA season in reaction to the COVID-19 pandemic. On June 4, it was announced that the season would resume for 22 of the 30 teams in the NBA Bubble, a $170 million investment to protect the players, the coaches, and the successful completion of the season. Near the end of the regular season, Silver stated that the bubble was "better than what we had envisioned."

== Honors ==
In 2016, Sports Business Journal ranked Silver No. 1 on its list of the 50 Most Influential People in Sports Business. In 2015, Silver was named Executive of the Year by Sports Business Journal. That same year, he was also named one of Time's 100 Most Influential People and one of Fortune's 50 Greatest Leaders.

In 2014, Silver was named the Sports Illustrated Executive of the Year. He is on Duke University's board of trustees and received the 2016 Distinguished Alumnus Award from the University of Chicago Law School. Silver is also on the board of the Lustgarten Foundation for Pancreatic Cancer Research.

Silver has sat on the board of trustees of NewYork–Presbyterian Hospital since 2023.

== Controversies ==
=== Luka Dončić–Anthony Davis trade ===
In February 2025, following the Luka Dončić–Anthony Davis trade, multiple conspiracy theories began circulating on social media platforms such as X, Instagram, and Reddit. Specifically, accusations were made by fans, without evidence, that Silver and the NBA forced a trade of Dončić to a large market franchise, the Los Angeles Lakers, in order to solve the ongoing NBA television ratings crisis, in which the NBA was experiencing a significant decrease in viewership. Another conspiracy theory alleged, without evidence, that the Mavericks were intentionally alienating their fanbase so that Silver and the Mavericks ownership could better justify moving the team to Las Vegas, where the Adelson family, who has significant holdings in the Mavericks, does much of its business. Mavericks owner Patrick Dumont and Silver both said that the Mavericks intended to stay in the Dallas area.

=== 2025 NBA draft lottery ===
As a result of not qualifying for the 2025 NBA playoffs, the Dallas Mavericks entered the 2025 NBA draft lottery with just 1.8% odds to obtain the first overall selection. Despite these low odds, the Mavericks received the first overall pick in the 2025 NBA draft, which prompted widespread accusations that the NBA draft lottery was rigged in order to compensate the Mavericks for the Dončić–Davis trade. On June 25, 2025, Duke University's All-American forward Cooper Flagg was drafted first overall by the Dallas Mavericks. The lottery drew comparisons to David Stern and the 1985 "frozen envelope" conspiracy theory, which alleged that the 1985 draft lottery was rigged so that the New York Knicks could select Georgetown superstar Patrick Ewing.

=== Sports betting scandals ===
Throughout Silver's tenure as NBA commissioner, a number of high-profile sports betting scandals have become public. On October 23, 2025 prosecutions, made by the FBI and the NYPD, allege that current and former NBA players and staff were involved in accepting bribes, participating in illegal gambling activities, wire fraud and money laundering. As part of these investigations, 34 people were arrested, including Portland Trail Blazers head coach Chauncey Billups and Miami Heat guard Terry Rozier. The alleged crimes were also reportedly conducted under influence by gangs in the American mafia. As part of a separate investigation, NBA player Jontay Porter received a lifetime ban from the NBA following a sports betting scandal. Many attribute these scandals to the connections between Silver's NBA and sports betting companies.

== Personal life ==
In 2015, Silver married interior designer Maggie Grise. They have two daughters, born in April 2017 and May 2020.
