= Robertson v. National Basketball Ass'n =

American legal case

- Court: United States Court of Appeals for the Second Circuit
- Full case name: Robertson v. National Basketball Association
- Argued: April 7, 1977
- Decided: June 9, 1977
- Citation: 556 F.2d 682

Court membership
- Judges sitting: James Lowell Oakes, Charles Edward Wyzanski Jr. (D. Mass.), James Stuart Holden (D. Vt.)

Case opinions
- Majority: Oakes, joined by unanimous

Laws applied
- Sherman Antitrust Act

Robertson v. National Basketball Association, 556 F.2d 682 (2d Cir. 1977), was an antitrust lawsuit filed by American basketball player Oscar Robertson against the National Basketball Association (NBA). Filed in 1970, the lawsuit was settled in 1976 and resulted in the free agency rules now used in the NBA.

== Facts ==
Robertson sought through his lawsuit to block any merger of the NBA with the American Basketball Association (ABA), to end the option clause that bound a player to a single NBA team in perpetuity, to end the NBA's college draft binding a player to one team, and to end restrictions on free-agent signings. The suit also sought damages for NBA players for past harm caused by the option clause.

Robertson's lawsuit prevented the planned 1970 merger of the National Basketball Association with the American Basketball Association.

== Judgment ==
The court issued an injunction against any merger. The ABA-NBA merger was thus delayed until 1976.

== Significance ==
In 1972, Congress came close to enacting legislation to enable a merger but the measure was not passed. As a result, the two leagues did not merge until 1976.

Although he wasn't playing anymore, Robertson was not out of sight. As president of the NBA players union, Robertson's 1970 suit against the NBA contended the draft, option clause and other rules restricting player movement were violations of antitrust laws. The suit was settled in 1976, when the league agreed to let players become free agents in exchange for their old team's "right of first refusal" to match any offer they might receive.

== See also ==
- Bosman ruling 1995 European Court of Justice ruling on soccer transfers
- Flood v. Kuhn
- O'Bannon v. NCAA
- Haywood v. National Basketball Association
