= Michele Roberts =

Michele Roberts may refer to:

- Michele A. Roberts, American attorney and executive director of the National Basketball Players Association
- Michèle Roberts (born 1949), British writer, novelist and poet
