= Tamika Tremaglio =

Executive director of the National Basketball Players Association

- Tremaglio in 2026
- Education: Mount St. Mary's University (BA); University of Maryland, Baltimore (JD)

Tamika Tremaglio is the former executive director of the National Basketball Players Association (NBPA). Tremaglio was selected by the players to replace Michele Roberts on September 22, 2021, and officially stepped into the role upon Roberts' retirement in early January 2022. Prior to joining the NBPA as executive director, Tremaglio, who retired from Deloitte LLP, served as the Managing Principal for Deloitte's Greater Washington offices.

== Early life and education ==
Tremaglio was born in St. Mary's County, Maryland. Tremaglio earned her Bachelor of Arts degree from Mount St. Mary's University in Business & Finance in 1992. She received a JD from the University of Maryland School of Law and an MBA from the University of Baltimore. Tremaglio's mother, Pamela Langley, attended Morgan State University.

== Career ==
Tremaglio joined Deloitte in November 2010 and was appointed Managing Principal for the Greater Washington Area in 2017. She later joined the NBPA as an executive director.

== Honors ==
Tremaglio was named Managing Partner of the Year in 2019 by the Washington Business Journal and was selected as one of Washington's 150 Most Powerful Women in 2019 and 2021 by the Washingtonian Magazine. In 2020, Tremaglio received the Triple-Impact Executive Award from the Positive Coaching Alliance.

== Personal life ==
Tremaglio is married to Gregory A. Tremaglio and has two sons, Rocque and Reece. She is Catholic and has been a longtime member of St. Peter Claver’s Church in St. Inigoes, Maryland.
