= Chris Paul =

American basketball player (born 1985)

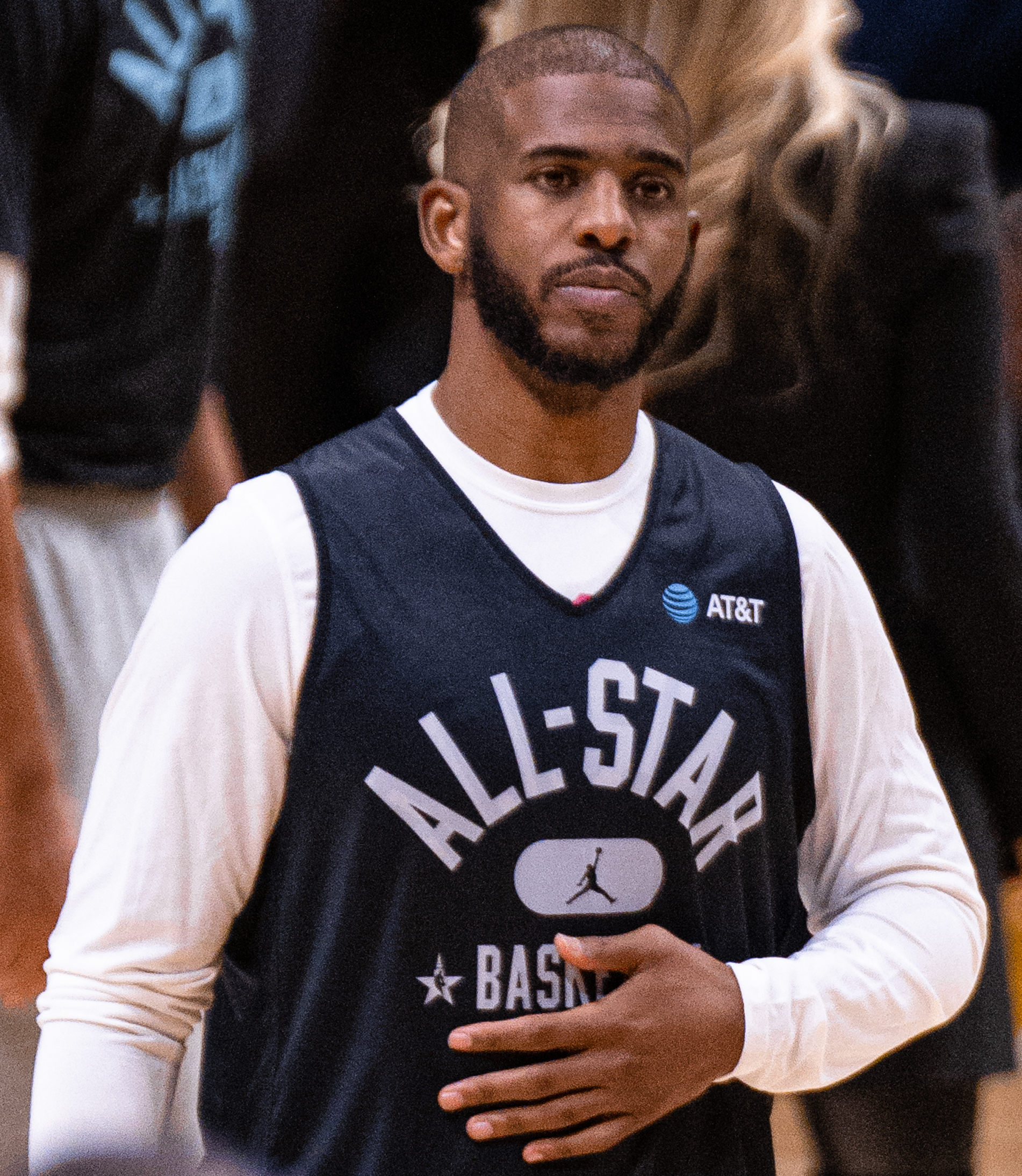
- Paul at the 2022 NBA All-Star Game

Personal information
- Born: May 6, 1985 (age 41) Winston-Salem, North Carolina, U.S. (Note: Paul has said that he was born in Winston-Salem, but some sources say he was born in Lewisville, North Carolina.)
- Listed height: 6 ft 0 in (1.83 m)
- Listed weight: 175 lb (79 kg)

Career information
- High school: West Forsyth (Clemmons, North Carolina)
- College: Wake Forest (2003–2005)
- NBA draft: 2005: 1st round, 4th overall pick
- Drafted by: New Orleans Hornets
- Playing career: 2005–2026
- Position: Point guard
- Number: 3

Career history
- 2005–2011: New Orleans Hornets (Note: During the 2005–06 and 2006–07 seasons, the team was known as the New Orleans/Oklahoma City Hornets during their temporary relocation to Oklahoma City due to Hurricane Katrina.)
- 2011–2017: Los Angeles Clippers
- 2017–2019: Houston Rockets
- 2019–2020: Oklahoma City Thunder
- 2020–2023: Phoenix Suns
- 2023–2024: Golden State Warriors
- 2024–2025: San Antonio Spurs
- 2025–2026: Los Angeles Clippers

Career highlights
- 12× NBA All-Star (2008–2016, 2020–2022); NBA All-Star Game MVP (2013); 4× All-NBA First Team (2008, 2012–2014); 5× All-NBA Second Team (2009, 2015, 2016, 2020, 2021); 2× All-NBA Third Team (2011, 2022); 7× NBA All-Defensive First Team (2009, 2012–2017); 2× NBA All-Defensive Second Team (2008, 2011); NBA Rookie of the Year (2006); NBA All-Rookie First Team (2006); 5× NBA assists leader (2008, 2009, 2014, 2015, 2022); 6× NBA steals leader (2008, 2009, 2011–2014); NBA 75th Anniversary Team; Consensus first-team All-American (2005); First-team All-ACC (2005); Third-team All-ACC (2004); ACC Rookie of the Year (2004); No. 3 retired by Wake Forest Demon Deacons; USA Basketball Male Athlete of the Year (2004); First-team Parade All-American (2003); McDonald's All-American (2003); North Carolina Mr. Basketball (2003)

Career statistics
- Points: 23,058 (16.8 ppg)
- Rebounds: 6,006 (4.4 rpg)
- Assists: 12,552 (9.2 apg)
- Stats at NBA.com
- Stats at Basketball Reference
Medals
Men's basketball
Representing the United States
Olympic Games
Gold medal – first place	2008 Beijing	Team competition
Gold medal – first place	2012 London	Team competition
FIBA World Championship
Bronze medal – third place	2006 Japan	Team competition

Christopher Emmanuel Paul Sr. (born May 6, 1985), nicknamed "CP3" and "the Point God", is an American former professional basketball player. Regarded as one of the greatest point guards of all time and one of the best NBA players without a championship, he won the NBA Rookie of the Year Award, an NBA All-Star Game Most Valuable Player Award, and two Olympic gold medals, and led the NBA in assists five times and steals a record six times. Paul has been selected to 12 NBA All-Star teams, 11 All-NBA teams, and nine NBA All-Defensive teams. In 2021, he was selected to the NBA 75th Anniversary Team. Paul served as the president of the National Basketball Players Association from 2013 to 2021. Among the highest-paid athletes in the world, he holds endorsement deals with companies such as Jordan Brand and State Farm.

Paul was a McDonald's All-American in high school and attended Wake Forest University for two years of college basketball, where he helped the Demon Deacons achieve their first-ever number-one ranking. Paul was selected as the fourth overall pick in the 2005 NBA draft by the New Orleans Hornets, where he developed into one of the league's best players, finishing second in NBA Most Valuable Player Award voting in 2008. During the 2011 offseason, the Hornets organized a deal to send Paul to the Los Angeles Lakers, but the transaction was controversially voided by the NBA (which temporarily owned the team at the time). He was instead dealt to the Los Angeles Clippers later that year. Led by Paul's playmaking, the Clippers developed a reputation for their fast-paced offense and spectacular alley-oop dunks, earning them the nickname "Lob City".

In 2017, Paul was traded to the Houston Rockets, where he helped the team win a franchise-record 65 games in his debut season. Paul played one more season in Houston before being traded to the Oklahoma City Thunder as part of a package for Russell Westbrook in 2019. With the Thunder looking to rebuild, Paul was traded to the Phoenix Suns in 2020, where he reached the NBA Finals for the first time in his career in 2021. The following season, Paul helped the team win a franchise-record 64 games. After three seasons in Phoenix, Paul was traded and spent one season with the Golden State Warriors, where he came off the bench for the first time in his career. He later signed with the San Antonio Spurs in 2024 before returning to the Clippers in 2025; after being cut in December, Paul retired two months later.

== Early life ==
Chris Paul was born in Winston-Salem, North Carolina, to Charles Edward Paul and Robin Jones. He grew up in Lewisville with his older brother, Charles "C.J." Paul Jr.. Paul's family gave him the nickname "CP3" because Paul, his father, and his brother all share the same initials. A former athlete himself, Charles Sr. taught his sons basketball and football and coached them in various youth leagues throughout their childhoods. Growing up, the Paul brothers spent their summers working at a service station owned by their grandfather Nathaniel Jones; Paul attributes many life lessons to his grandfather and has described him as his "best friend." Paul was raised Baptist.

== High school career ==
Paul attended West Forsyth High School in Clemmons, North Carolina. During his freshman and sophomore seasons, he played on the junior varsity team. In his junior year, Paul averaged 25 points, 5.3 assists, and 4.4 steals per game, helping West Forsyth reach the state semifinals. Over the ensuing summer, he led the Winston-Salem-based Kappa Magic to the National U-17 AAU title, earning tournament MVP honors in the process. During his senior season, Paul received national attention for scoring 61 points in a game, then intentionally missing the following free throw and taking himself out of the game, despite the fact that he was only six points away from the North Carolina state record of 67. He did this in order to score exactly 61 points in honor of his 61-year-old grandfather, who had been murdered only days earlier. Paul finished the season with averages of 30.8 points, 5.9 rebounds, 9.5 assists, and 6.0 steals per game, leading West Forsyth to a 27–3 record and the Class 4A Eastern Regional finals. He was ultimately named a McDonald's All-American, first-team Parade All-American, and North Carolina's Mr. Basketball by The Charlotte Observer.

== College career ==
As a freshman at Wake Forest University, Paul averaged 14.8 points, 5.9 assists, and 2.7 steals per game, setting school freshman records for three-point percentage, free throws, free throw percentage, assists, and steals in the process. Behind his play, the Demon Deacons qualified for the NCAA tournament, losing in the Sweet Sixteen to St. Joseph's. At the end of the season, Paul was named ACC Rookie of the Year and Third Team All-ACC.

For two weeks early in Paul's sophomore season, Wake Forest was ranked number one in the nation for the first time in school history. On January 15, 2005, Paul registered 26 points and eight assists in a victory over rival North Carolina, and on February 3, he scored 23 points in a victory over rival Duke. In the final game of the year, Paul punched NC State guard Julius Hodge in the groin and received a one-game suspension from the ACC Tournament, an incident that marred Paul's image for a short time. The Demon Deacons again qualified for the NCAA tournament but suffered a second round upset at the hands of West Virginia. With final averages of 15.3 points, 4.5 rebounds, 6.6 assists, and 2.4 steals per game, Paul was eventually named First Team Consensus All-America, and with a 3.21 grade point average (GPA), he was also named to ESPN's Academic All-America Team. On April 15, 2005, Paul announced he would be hiring an agent and turning professional. On March 2, 2013, Wake Forest retired Paul's jersey. In 2021, he was inducted into the Wake Forest Sports Hall of Fame.

== Professional career ==
=== New Orleans Hornets (2005–2011) ===
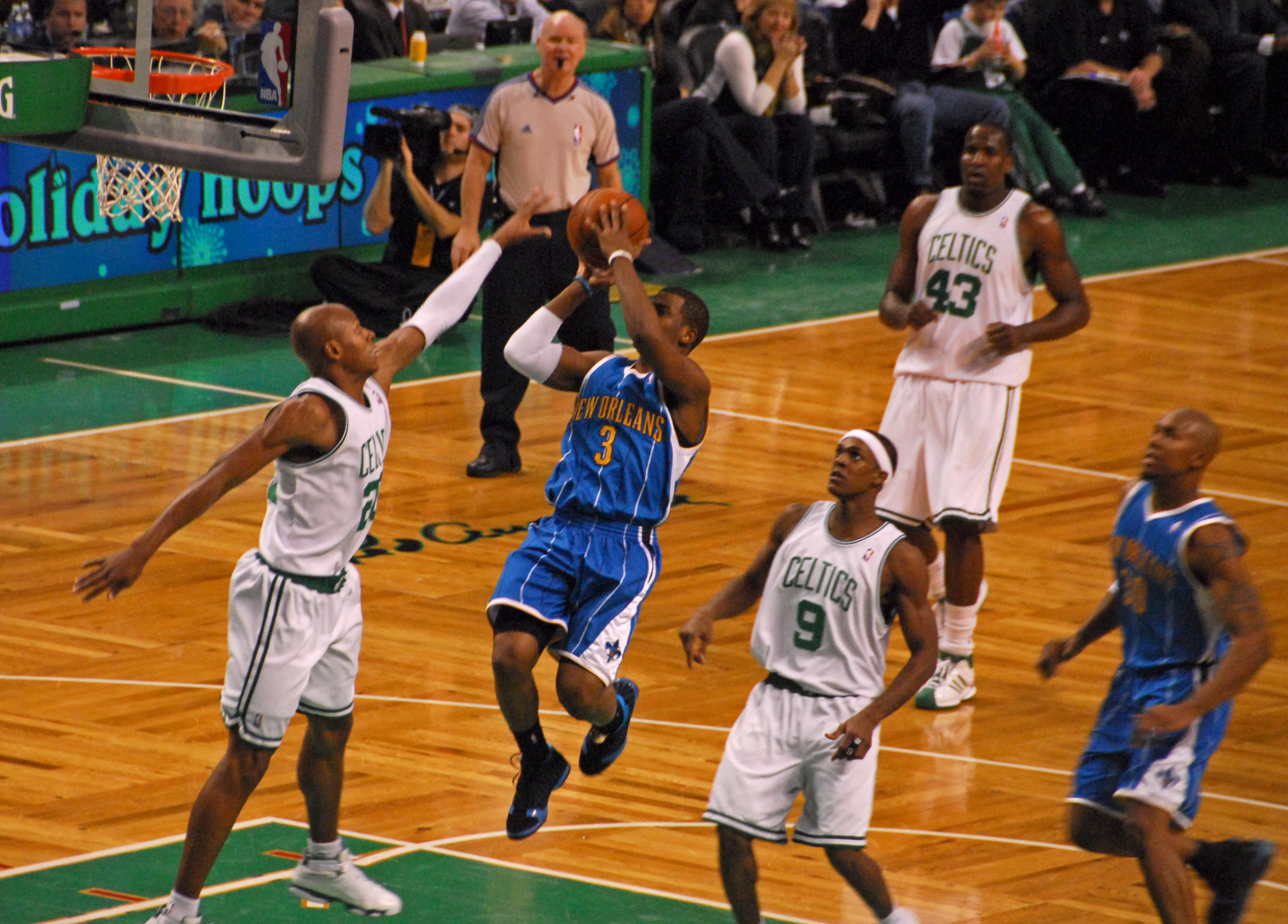
Paul attempts a runner in December 2008.

==== Early seasons in New Orleans and Oklahoma City (2005–2007) ====
Paul was selected as the fourth overall pick in the 2005 NBA draft by the New Orleans Hornets. Due to the devastation caused by Hurricane Katrina, the Hornets played most of their games in Oklahoma City during Paul's first two seasons with the team. Paul finished his debut season leading all rookies in total points, assists, steals, and double-doubles, and became only the second rookie in NBA history to lead the league in total steals. With final averages of 16.1 points, 5.1 rebounds, 7.8 assists, and 2.2 steals per game, he was named NBA Rookie of the Year, falling just one vote shy of winning the award unanimously. The only other rookie to receive a first place vote was Deron Williams, with whom Paul enjoyed a brief rivalry early in their careers.

At the 2007 All-Star Weekend, Paul set new Rookie Challenge records with 17 assists and 9 steals. For his sophomore season, he increased his scoring and passing averages to 17.3 points and 8.9 assists per game, but played in only 64 games due to injury.

==== Rise to stardom (2007–2011) ====
Paul was selected to his first NBA All-Star Game in 2007–08, playing in front of his home fans in New Orleans. Behind his leadership, the Hornets were near the top of the Western Conference standings all year, temporarily occupying first place on March 17 following a win against the Chicago Bulls. New Orleans finished the season with a franchise-record 56 wins and the second seed in the West. Paul led the NBA with 11.6 assists and 2.7 steals per game to go along with 21.1 points per game, finishing second in NBA Most Valuable Player Award voting and being named to his first All-NBA and All-Defensive teams. In his playoff debut, he scored 35 points against the Dallas Mavericks. In Game 2, he set a franchise playoff record with 17 assists. The Hornets defeated the Mavericks in five games, with Paul registering 24 points, 11 rebounds, and 15 assists in the final game. Their run came to an end in the next round, where they were eliminated by the San Antonio Spurs.

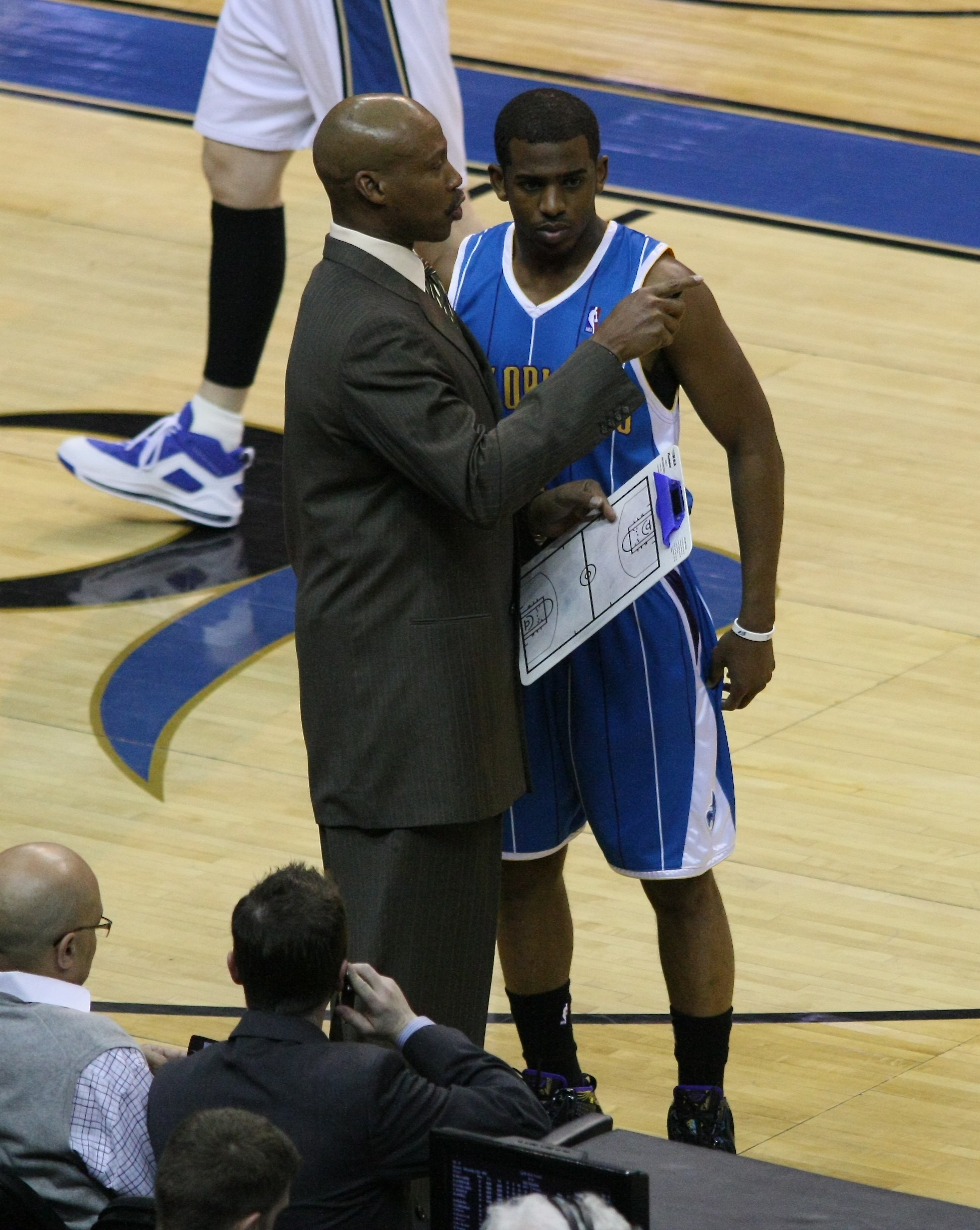
Paul speaks with Hornets coach Byron Scott in March 2009.

Prior to the start of the 2008–09 season, Paul signed a three-year contract extension with the Hornets worth $68 million with a player option for a fourth year. On December 17, 2008, he set the NBA record for consecutive games with a steal at 106. On several occasions, he came within a few steals of recording a quadruple-double, including a 27-point, 10-rebound, 15-assist, and 7-steal game against the Philadelphia 76ers on January 26, 2009. His final averages were 22.8 points, 5.5 rebounds, 11 assists, and 2.8 steals per game. Despite Paul's individual accomplishments, New Orleans' record fell from the year before and they were eliminated in the first round of the playoffs by the Denver Nuggets.

After a slow start to the 2009–10 season, the Hornets fired coach Byron Scott. Paul stirred up controversy when he announced his displeasure with the move, commenting that team management should have "consulted with me and asked how I felt before it happened." In early February 2010, Paul tore cartilage in his left knee and was sidelined for over a month by surgery, forcing him to miss the All-Star Game. In total, he played in only 45 games and his averages dropped to 18.7 points, 3.8 rebounds, 10.7 assists, and 2.1 steals per game. Without Paul, the Hornets struggled, missing the playoffs.

In 2010–11, Paul had another injury scare, suffering a concussion on March 6 after colliding with Cavaliers guard Ramon Sessions and being carried off the court on a stretcher. He returned two games later, registering 33 points and 15 assists against the Sacramento Kings. With the luxury of Paul playing a full season, the Hornets qualified for the playoffs and were matched up with the defending champion Los Angeles Lakers in the first round. In Game 1, Paul contributed 33 points, 14 assists, and 4 steals, and in Game 4, he registered 27 points, 13 rebounds, and 15 assists. In response to Paul's performances, Lakers beat writer Dave McMenamin declared that Paul was having a "historically great series". Nevertheless, New Orleans were eliminated in six games, and ownership, fearing that Paul would leave the franchise via free agency, began actively pursuing a trade that would provide the team equitable compensation in return for his services.

=== Los Angeles Clippers (2011–2017) ===
==== Failed Lakers trade and "Lob City" rise (2011–2012) ====
On December 8, 2011, the Hornets agreed to a three-team trade sending Paul to the Lakers. The NBA, who owned the Hornets at the time, nullified the deal because commissioner David Stern claimed that New Orleans would be better off by keeping Paul. The teams involved in the transaction attempted to lobby the league to reverse its ruling and reconstruct the deal to no avail. On December 12, the Hornets agreed to a trade sending Paul to the Los Angeles Clippers, but the deal broke down after the NBA added additional demands to the original terms. Two days later, the teams finally completed the trade, sending Paul and two future second-round draft picks to the Clippers in return for Eric Gordon, Chris Kaman, Al-Farouq Aminu, and the Minnesota Timberwolves' unprotected first-round pick in the 2012 draft, which was used to draft Austin Rivers. Upon the deal's completion, Paul announced that he would opt into the final year of his contract and remain in Los Angeles for at least two more seasons.

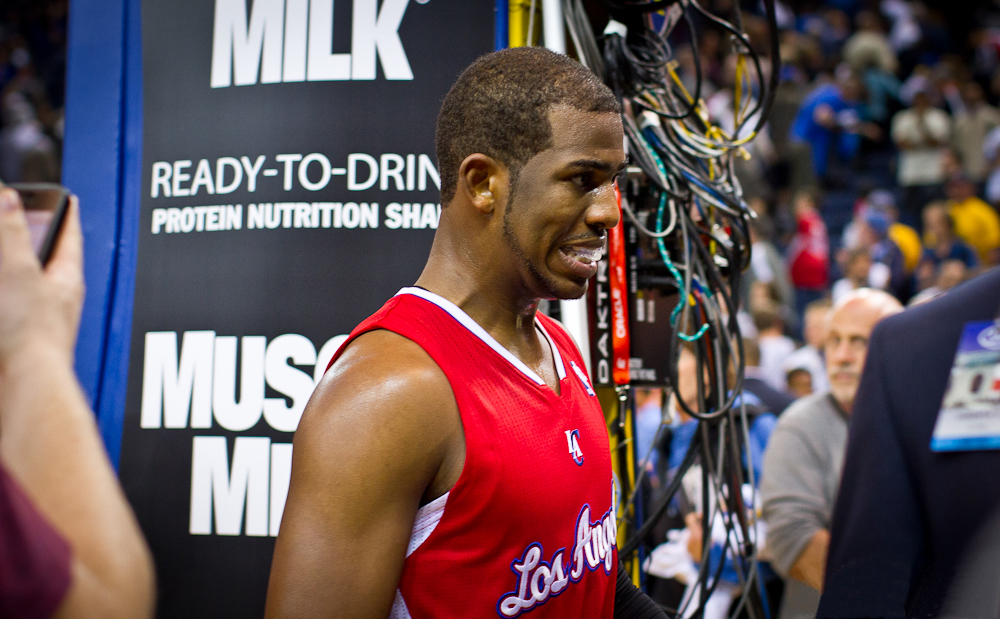
Paul in February 2012

Paul's arrival to Los Angeles rejuvenated the Clippers franchise, with teammate Blake Griffin later commenting, "It put us on the map." Early in Paul's debut season, the team developed a reputation for their fast-paced offense and spectacular alley-oop dunks, usually from Paul to Griffin or DeAndre Jordan, earning them the nickname "Lob City". Paul finished the year averaging 19.8 points, 9.1 assists, and 2.5 steals per game, becoming the first Clipper to be named to the All-NBA First Team since the franchise moved to Los Angeles in the 1980s. Behind his play and the emergence of Griffin as an All-NBA performer, Los Angeles qualified for the playoffs, losing to the San Antonio Spurs in the conference semifinals.

==== Playoff upsets (2012–2015) ====
At the 2013 All-Star Game, Paul led the West to victory with a 20-point and 15-assist performance, earning his first NBA All-Star Game Most Valuable Player Award. He finished the season averaging 16.9 points, 9.7 assists, and 2.4 steals per game, helping the Clippers to a franchise-record 56 wins. Seeded fourth in the West entering the playoffs, Los Angeles were defeated in the first round by the Memphis Grizzlies. Shortly after their early postseason exit, the Clippers announced they would not renew coach Vinny Del Negro's contract and rumors arose of Paul forcing Del Negro out. Los Angeles later denied any player involvement in the coaching decision.

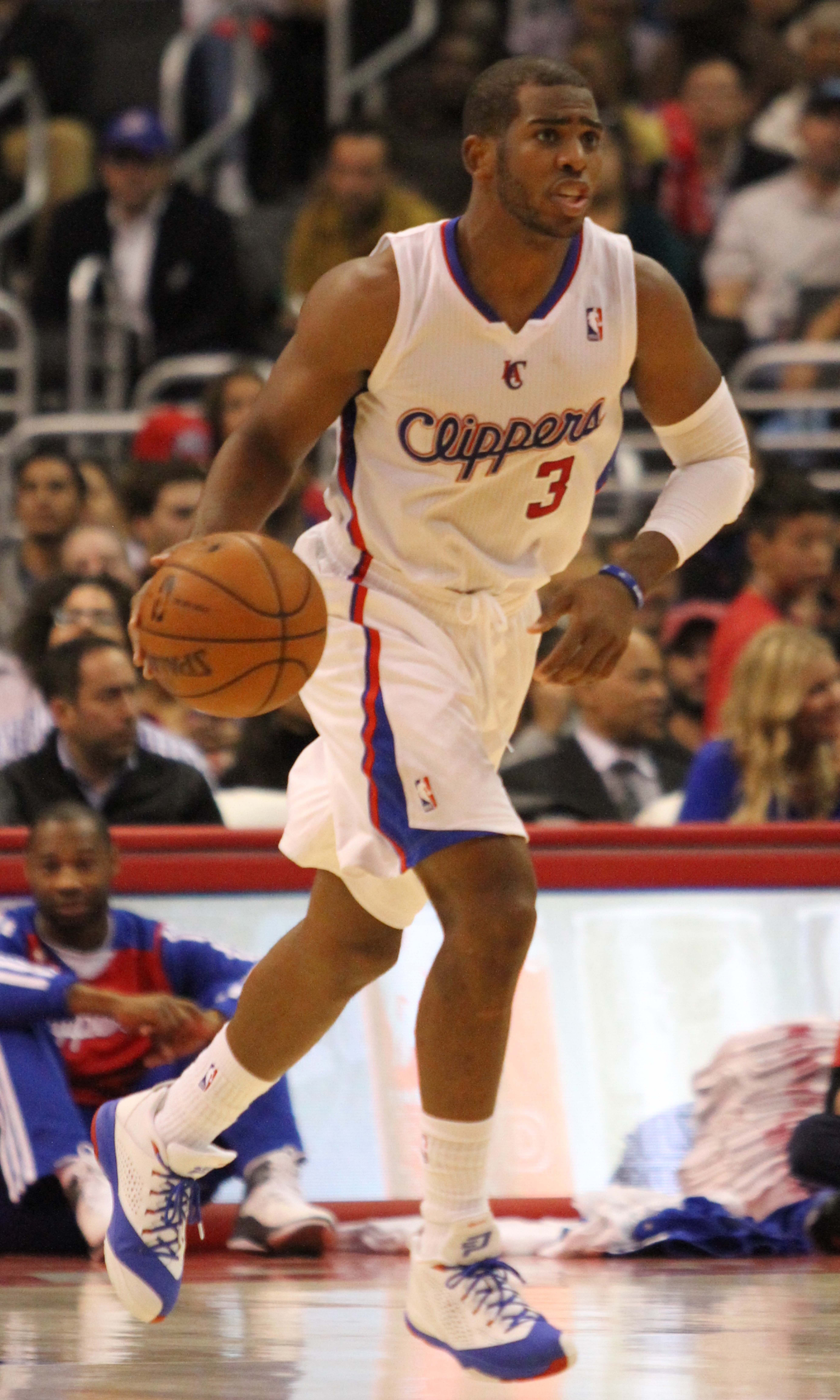
Paul dribbles the ball in November 2013.

Prior to the start of the 2013–14 season, Paul re-signed with the Clippers for five years on a contract worth approximately $107 million. Despite a shoulder injury that sidelined him for over a month, Los Angeles set another new franchise record for wins with 57. His final averages were 19.1 points, 10.7 assists, and 2.5 steals per game. In Game 1 of the second round of the playoffs, he hit a career postseason-high eight three-pointers to help the Clippers take an early series lead over the Oklahoma City Thunder. In Game 5 and with the series tied 2–2, he made a string of late mistakes leading to an eventual Thunder victory, later commenting, "It's me ... Everything that happened at the end is on me." Oklahoma City eventually eliminated Los Angeles in six games.

In 2014–15, Paul played in all 82 games for the first time in his career, averaging 19.1 points and a league-high 10.2 assists per game. In Game 7 of the first round of the playoffs, he hit a go-ahead shot with a second left to lift the Clippers over the Spurs despite a hamstring injury. The injury forced him to miss the first two games of the next series versus the Houston Rockets, and Los Angeles eventually lost in seven games despite holding a 3–1 series lead. The defeat marked ten consecutive seasons and seven consecutive playoff appearances without an NBA Conference Finals appearance for Paul.

==== Final years with Clippers (2015–2017) ====
In January of the 2015–16 season, Paul led the Clippers on a ten-game winning streak despite missing Griffin and Jordan at various points due to injury. For the third straight year, he finished the season with averages of over 19 points, 10 assists, and 2 steals per game. To begin the postseason, the Clippers drew a matchup with the Portland Trail Blazers, taking a 2–1 lead to start the series. In Game 4, Paul broke his hand and was ruled out indefinitely. Without Paul, as well as Griffin, who also injured himself in Game 4, Los Angeles eventually lost the series in six games.

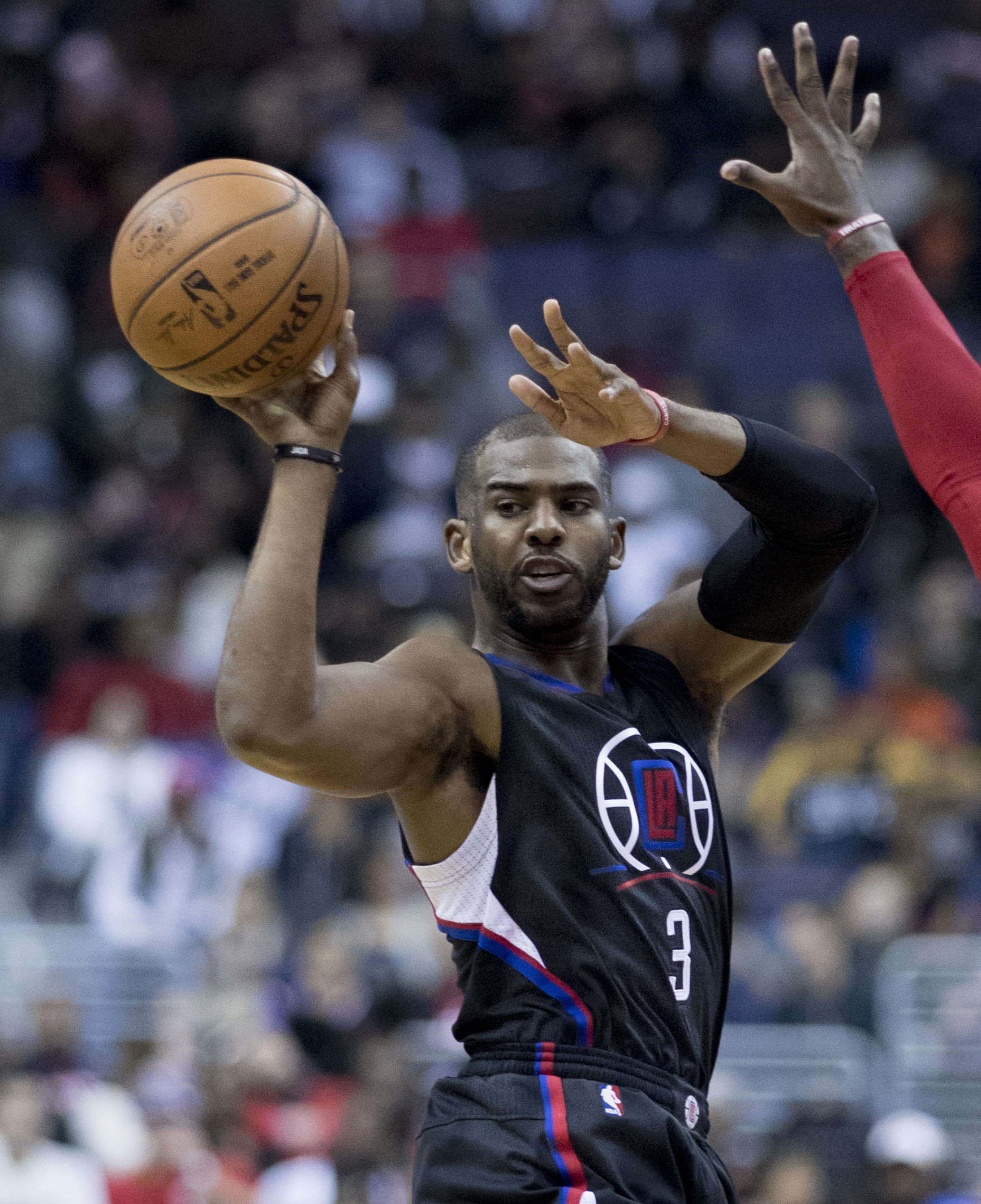
Paul in 2016

In 2016–17, Paul missed 21 regular season games due to rest or injury, and averaged 18.1 points, 9.2 assists, and 5 rebounds in just over 31 minutes per game. At season's end, Paul was not rewarded with an All-NBA honor, marking just the second time he failed to make an All-NBA team since 2008 and the first time in his six years as a Clipper. In the playoffs, Los Angeles was eliminated after their first round series against the Utah Jazz, with Paul averaging 25.3 points, 9.9 assists, 5 rebounds per game over seven games.

=== Houston Rockets (2017–2019) ===
==== First Conference Finals appearance (2017–2018) ====
On June 28, 2017, Paul was traded to the Houston Rockets in exchange for Patrick Beverley, Sam Dekker, Montrezl Harrell, Darrun Hilliard, DeAndre Liggins, Lou Williams, Kyle Wiltjer, a future first-round pick, and cash considerations. The Clippers ultimately decided to trade Paul because they were unwilling to offer him the contract extension that he was seeking and they did not want to lose him for nothing once he became a free agent. Paul, who was interested in playing alongside superstar guard James Harden, opted into the final year of his existing contract to facilitate the trade. Some analysts were initially skeptical of the trade due to the perceived redundancy of Paul and Harden's playing ball-dominating playing styles, leading to questions over how they would adjust to each other.

On October 17, Paul debuted for the Rockets in their season-opening win over the defending champion Golden State Warriors. He scored only four points on 2-for-9 shooting and sat on the bench down the stretch while the Rockets made their final push. It was later revealed that he was playing through a knee injury, and he subsequently missed the next 14 games, returning to the lineup on November 16 against the Phoenix Suns. With Paul healthy, Houston quickly established themselves as a championship contender, boasting the league's top-ranked offense in addition to a top-ten defense. Their success was primarily driven by Paul and Harden, who assumed playmaking duties while role players such as Eric Gordon, Trevor Ariza, and P. J. Tucker provided floor spacing with three-point shooting. On December 15, Paul registered 28 points, eight assists, and seven steals against the Spurs to lead the Rockets to their 12th straight victory. On January 26, 2018, he scored a season-high 38 points in a loss to the New Orleans Pelicans. The Rockets eventually finished the 2017–18 season with a franchise-record 65 wins and the best record in the NBA, which included Harden winning the MVP Award and the team setting a league record for three-point attempts. Paul's final averages were 18.6 points, 7.9 assists, and 1.7 steals per game.

In the first round of the playoffs, Houston eliminated the Minnesota Timberwolves, earning them a matchup with the Utah Jazz in the second round. In Game 5 of the series, Paul scored a career playoff-high 41 points along with eight three-pointers, 10 assists, and seven rebounds en route to a series-clinching victory over the Jazz. With the win, Paul advanced to the NBA Conference Finals for the first time in his career, where the Warriors awaited. Going into Game 5, the series was tied 2–2 before Paul helped lead Houston to victory by scoring seven fourth quarter points that powered a 10–5 run and gave the Rockets a lead that they never relinquished. However, Paul injured his hamstring late in the game, and with him out for the remainder of the series, Houston was eliminated from the postseason with back-to-back losses.

==== Uneventful season (2018–2019) ====
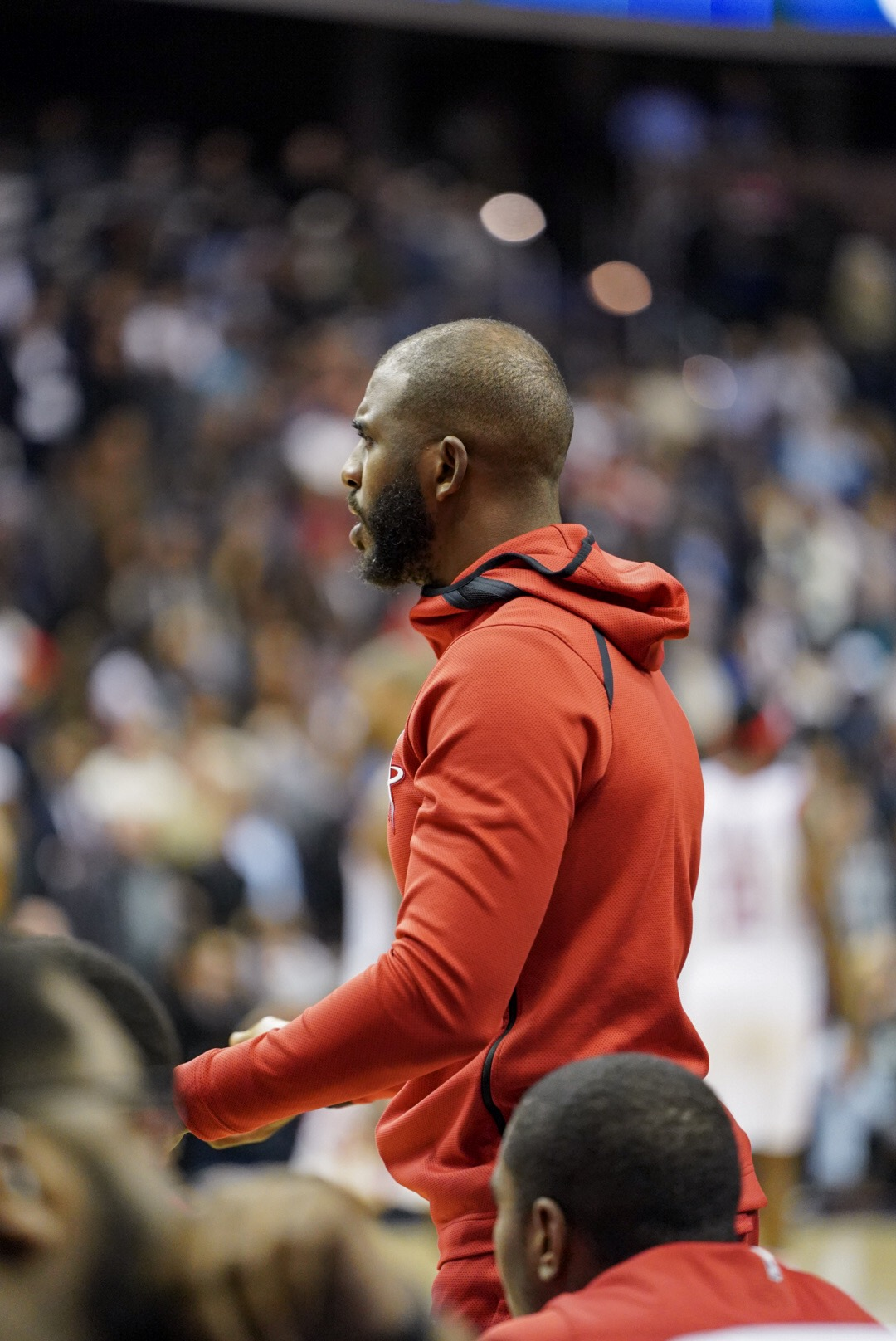
Paul in 2018

On July 8, 2018, Paul signed a four-year, $160 million maximum contract extension with the Rockets. On October 20, shortly after the start of the 2018–19 season, he was involved in an on-court altercation with Rajon Rondo of the Lakers, which resulted in a two-game suspension and a fine. On December 20, he suffered a left hamstring strain against the Miami Heat, which caused him to miss 17 consecutive games. On February 23, he recorded 23 points and a season-high 17 assists in a win over the Warriors. Late in the season, Paul found himself in the midst of a slump and Houston dropped down to the third seed in the conference, which prompted some analysts to wonder if Paul had moved into a new, less effective phase of his career. In the conference semifinals, the Rockets again found themselves matched up with Golden State, but could not close out the series despite the Warriors' primary scorer, Kevin Durant, missing the final two games.

=== Oklahoma City Thunder (2019–2020) ===
On July 16, 2019, the Rockets traded Paul, two protected first-round draft picks, and two first-round pick swaps to the Oklahoma City Thunder in exchange for Russell Westbrook. For the first time in years, Paul found himself on a young, rebuilding team without championship aspirations. Despite speculation that the Thunder would try to move on from Paul immediately, he embraced his role as a veteran leader of the team, which earned him praise from coach Billy Donovan. Paul debuted for Oklahoma City in a loss to the Utah Jazz on October 23, registering 22 points and 8 rebounds in 30 minutes of play. On January 30, he was selected to his 10th All-Star nod, and first since 2016, being named a Western Conference reserve. On February 11, Paul scored a season-high 31 points in a loss to the San Antonio Spurs.

Following a break in the season due to the COVID-19 pandemic, the Thunder eventually finished as the fifth seed in the conference, earning them a matchup with Paul's old team, the Houston Rockets, in the first round of the playoffs. Trailing 3–2 going into Game 6, Paul scored 15 of his 28 points in the fourth quarter to lead Oklahoma City to a series-tying victory. Although the Thunder would ultimately lose Game 7 and be eliminated from the postseason, Sports Illustrated deemed Paul's tenure with the team a success and opined that he had reestablished himself as one of the best point guards in the NBA.

=== Phoenix Suns (2020–2023) ===
==== Only Finals appearance (2020–2021) ====
On November 16, 2020, the Thunder traded Paul and Abdel Nader to the Phoenix Suns for Kelly Oubre Jr., Ricky Rubio, Ty Jerome, Jalen Lecque, and a 2022 protected first-round pick. On February 1, 2021, Paul dropped a season-high 34 points, along with nine rebounds and nine assists, in a close 109–108 win over the Dallas Mavericks. On February 19, he put up a season-high 19 assists while also scoring 15 points in a 132–114 win over the New Orleans Pelicans. On February 23, Paul was selected to his 11th All-Star appearance, second in a row, as a Western Conference reserve. With Devin Booker being named a replacement All-Star a day later, Paul and Booker were the first Suns duo since Steve Nash and Amar'e Stoudemire in 2010 to be named All-Stars. On March 21, Paul logged his first triple-double of the season with 11 points, 10 rebounds and 13 assists in a 111–94 win over the Los Angeles Lakers, becoming the sixth player in NBA history to record 10,000 career assists.

In Game 2 of the Conference Semifinals against the Denver Nuggets, Paul recorded 17 points, 15 assists, and 0 turnovers in a 123–98 victory. This was Paul's third playoff game with at least 15 points, 15 assists, and 0 turnovers, the most in NBA history. In Game 4, Paul scored 37 points on a 74 percent shooting (14-of-19) alongside seven assists in a 125–118 victory, leading the Suns to a 4–0 series sweep over the Nuggets for their first Western Conference Finals appearance since 2010. On June 16, Paul was indefinitely sidelined as he entered the NBA's COVID-19 health and safety protocols. Paul endured an eight-day isolation after testing positive for COVID-19 despite being vaccinated, which caused him to miss the first two games of the Western Conference Finals. In Game 6 of the Western Conference Finals against the Los Angeles Clippers, Paul tied a playoff career-high 41 points, while putting up eight assists, in a 130–103 victory to close out the series, advancing to the NBA Finals for the first time in his career and the Suns' first appearance since 1993. During the game Paul scored 31 out of his 41 points in the second half, becoming just the third player in the last 25 years to score at least 30 points in the second half of a series-clinching game. In Game 1 of the NBA Finals against the Milwaukee Bucks, Paul put up 32 points, 16 of those in the third quarter, along with nine assists, in a 118–105 win. The Suns jumped to a 2–0 lead in the series before losing in six games. Paul became the first player in NBA playoff history to lose four series in which his team led 2–0. After the Finals ended, he had wrist surgery.

==== Franchise record in wins (2021–2022) ====
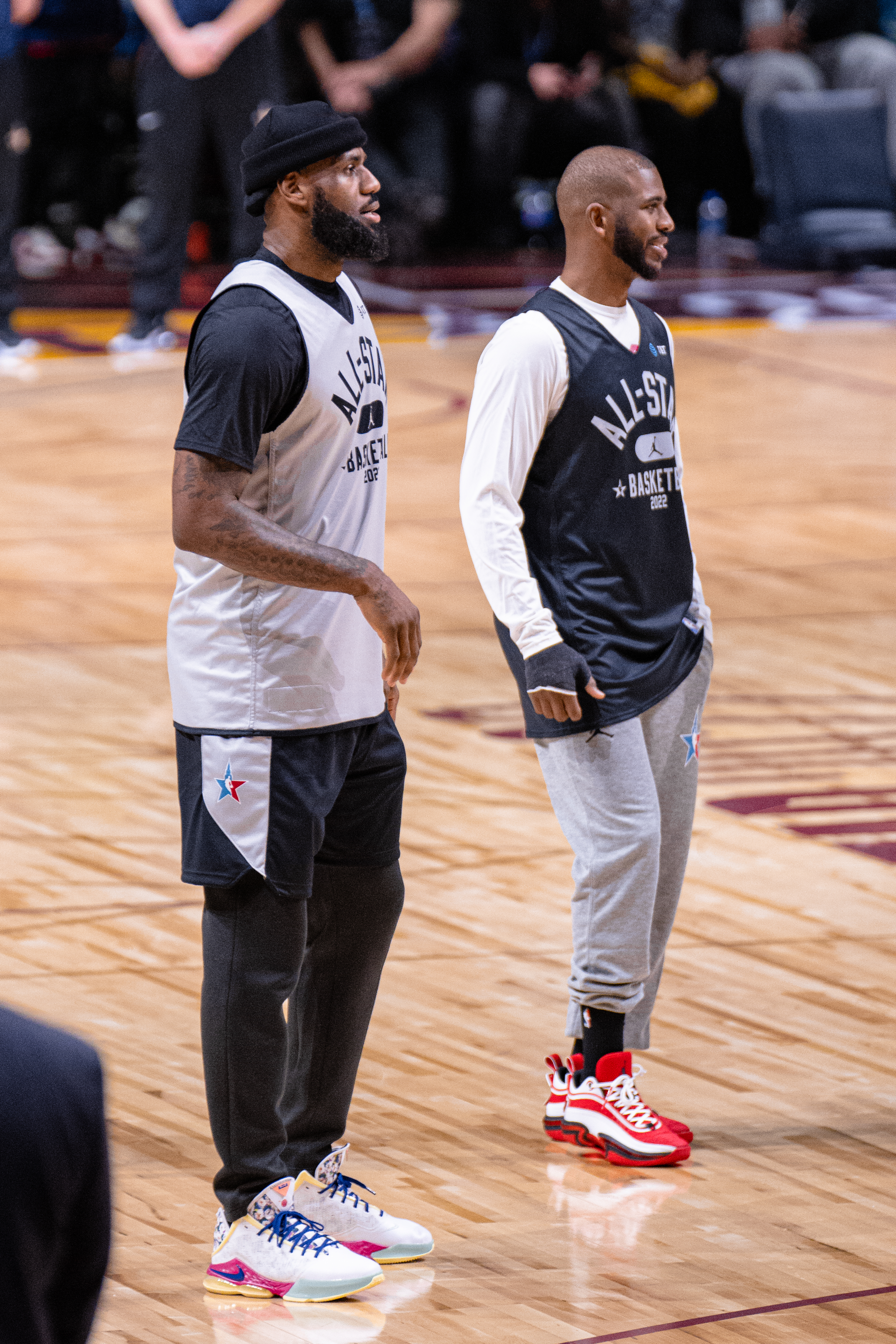
Paul (right) alongside LeBron James at the 2022 NBA All-Star Game

On August 7, 2021, Paul signed a four-year contract extension with the Suns worth up to $120 million. On October 22, Paul recorded 23 points and 14 assists in a 115–105 win over the Los Angeles Lakers, becoming the first player in league history to record 20,000 points and 10,000 assists in their career. On November 2, Paul put up 14 points and 18 assists in a 112–100 win over the New Orleans Pelicans, moving past Mark Jackson and Steve Nash for third place on the NBA all-time career assists list. On December 2, Paul put up 12 points and 12 assists in a 114–103 win over the Detroit Pistons, leading the Suns to their franchise-record 18th win in a row. On January 24, 2022, Paul scored 27 points, grabbed nine rebounds and dished out 14 assists in a 115–109 win against the Utah Jazz. On January 28, Paul logged his 18th career triple-double with 21 points, 10 rebounds, and 14 assists in a 134–124 win over the Minnesota Timberwolves. The following game, Paul had a season-high 19 assists with 20 points and eight rebounds in a 115–110 win against the San Antonio Spurs.

On February 3, Paul recorded 18 points, 12 assists, and three steals in a 124–115 loss to the Atlanta Hawks who snapped Phoenix's 11-game winning streak. This was Paul's 50th career game with 10 assists or more with no turnovers—the most such games in NBA history. Before the game, he was named a reserve for the 2022 NBA All-Star Game. On February 10, Paul tied his season-high 19 assists with 17 points and seven rebounds as he led the Suns to a 131–107 victory against the Bucks in a rematch of last year's NBA Finals. Paul finished with his 500th career double-double. He is just the fourth guard in NBA history to accomplish that feat. On February 16, Paul broke his right thumb in a game against the Houston Rockets, just before the All-Star break. On March 24, Paul returned from a broken right wrist to help the Suns wrap up the top seed in the NBA playoffs with a 140–130 victory over the Denver Nuggets. He finished the game with 17 points and 13 assists. On April 1, Paul surpassed Gary Payton for fourth on the NBA all-time career steals list. On April 5, after Phoenix's 121–110 win over the Lakers set the team's season total to 64 wins, Paul became the first player in NBA history to be part of four teams to set a franchise record for victories in a single season.

In Game 1 of the first round of the playoffs, Paul scored 19 of his 30 points in the fourth quarter along with seven rebounds, 10 assists, and three steals on 12-of-16 shooting from the field in a 110–99 win over the New Orleans Pelicans. He also became the oldest player in NBA history to put up at least 30 points and 10 assists in a playoff game. In Game 3, Paul scored 19 of his 28 points in the fourth quarter along with 14 assists to lead the Suns to a 114–111 win. In Game 6, he closed the series with 33 points along with eight assists and five rebounds on 14-of-14 shooting, which set the record for the most field goals in a game without a miss in NBA playoffs history. On May 2, in Game 1 of the Western Conference Semifinals, Paul moved past Tony Parker for fifth all-time in career playoff assists in a 121–114 win over the Dallas Mavericks. The Suns jumped to a 2–0 lead in the series before losing in seven games. Paul then became the first player in NBA playoff history to lose five series in which his team led 2–0, breaking his own NBA record, of four, set the previous year.

==== 20,000 points and 11,000 assists (2022–2023) ====
On October 23, 2022, Paul recorded seven points, eight rebounds and eleven assists in an 112–95 win over the Los Angeles Clippers. He joined John Stockton and Jason Kidd as the only players in NBA history with 11,000 assists. Paul also became the first player in the league with 20,000 points and 11,000 assists. On October 30, Paul posted 15 assists along with 10 points and 0 turnovers in a 124–109 win over the Houston Rockets. On December 19, Paul scored a then season-high 28 points and delivered eight assists in a 130–104 win over the Los Angeles Lakers. On Christmas Day, Paul recorded 17 points, a then season-high 16 assists and 0 turnovers in a 128–125 overtime loss against the Denver Nuggets.

On January 22, 2023, Paul returned to the lineup after missing the previous seven games with a hip injury. He had 22 points, 11 assists, six rebounds and three steals to lead the Suns to an 112–110 win over the Memphis Grizzlies. On January 28, Paul scored a season-high 31 points, along with seven rebounds and 11 assists in a 128–118 overtime win over the San Antonio Spurs. On February 14, Paul posted 17 points and a season-high 19 assists in a 120–107 win over the Sacramento Kings. The next game, Paul surpassed Michael Jordan for third on the NBA all-time career steals list. On April 6, Paul scored 25 points and made a career-high seven three-pointers in a 119–115 win over the Denver Nuggets.

=== Golden State Warriors (2023–2024) ===
On June 24, 2023, the Suns traded Paul, Landry Shamet, four first-round pick swaps, and six second-round draft picks to the Washington Wizards for Bradley Beal, Jordan Goodwin, and Isaiah Todd. Twelve days later, the Wizards sent Paul to the Golden State Warriors in exchange for Jordan Poole, Patrick Baldwin Jr., Ryan Rollins, and two draft picks. On October 24, Paul debuted for the Warriors in their season-opening 108–104 loss against the Phoenix Suns. He finished the game with 14 points, six rebounds, nine assists and two steals. On October 29, Paul came off the bench for the first time in his NBA career, ending his NBA-record streak of 1,365 consecutive games started, in a 106–95 win over the Houston Rockets. On January 5, 2024, Paul fractured his left hand in the third quarter of a 113–109 win over the Detroit Pistons, which required a surgery, but was expected to return later during the season. On June 30, 2024, he was waived and became a free agent.

=== San Antonio Spurs (2024–2025) ===
On July 7, 2024, Paul signed a one-year, $11 million deal with the San Antonio Spurs. His decision to sign with the team, which had only won 22 games the season before, stemmed from his desire to receive playing time rather than chasing a championship. On November 15, Paul logged 11 points and 11 assists in a 120–115 loss to the Los Angeles Lakers. He also logged the 12,000th assist of his career, joining John Stockton and Jason Kidd as the only players to reach the milestone. Paul passed Kidd for second all-time in career assists and career steals on December 8, 2024 and February 20, 2025, respectively. On April 13, Paul played in the season finale, recording 15 points, seven rebounds, six assists and four steals in a 125–118 win over the Toronto Raptors, becoming the first player in NBA history to accumulate 23,000 points with at least 12,000 assists. He also started all 82 games, making him the first player to do that in year 20. The previous mark on that front was held by Utah’s John Stockton, who started all 82 games in his 19th and final season.

=== Los Angeles Clippers (2025–2026) ===
On July 21, 2025, Paul signed a one-year, $3.6 million contract to return to the Los Angeles Clippers for his 21st season in the NBA. On November 22, Paul confirmed on social media that this would be his final year and he planned on retiring after the season. In 16 total appearances for Los Angeles, he recorded averages of 2.9 points, 1.8 rebounds, and 3.3 assists. On December 3, the Clippers announced that they planned to part ways with Paul and sent him home. Shams Charania reported that Paul and Clippers coach Tyronn Lue clashed over their differing styles and were not speaking to each other at the time. The decision was widely condemned, particularly by former Clippers star Blake Griffin, who said:

You can build a new arena, you can be at games, you can cheer on the team, you're gonna have all this high energy but at the end of the day an organization is built on a foundation of respect and it's built on how you treat people and I don't think that in this situation Chris was treated right. I'm sorta at a loss for words a little bit.

On February 5, 2026, Paul was traded to the Toronto Raptors in a three-team trade involving the Brooklyn Nets. The Clippers received the draft rights to Vanja Marinković. The Raptors waived Paul on February 13, and he subsequently announced his retirement from the NBA.

== National team career ==
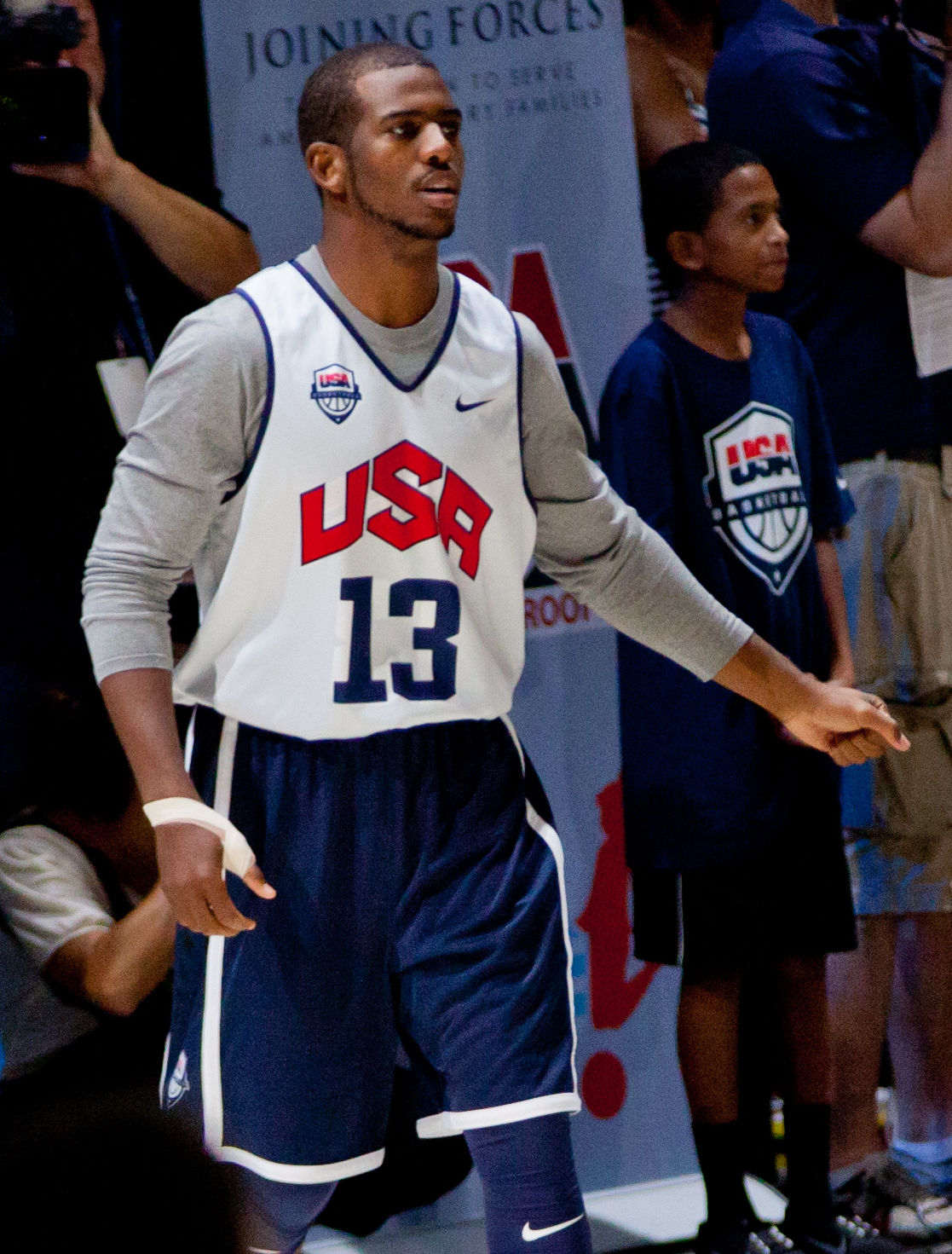
Paul with Team USA in 2012

Paul made his debut for the United States national team at the 2006 FIBA World Championship in Japan. He finished the competition with a tournament-high 44 assists, helping Team USA win the bronze medal in the process. At the 2008 Olympics in Beijing, he played a key role off the bench, scoring 13 points in a gold medal game victory against Spain. In addition to the gold medal, Team USA also finished the competition with a perfect 8–0 record. Paul was promoted to the starting point guard position for the 2012 Olympics in London, averaging 8.2 points, 5.1 assists, and 1.6 steals per game en route to another gold medal and undefeated tournament.

== Player profile ==
Listed at 6 ft 0 in (1.83 m) tall and weighing 175 pounds (79 kg), Paul exclusively played the point guard position. His career averages are 16.8 points, 4.4 rebounds, 9.2 assists, and 2.0 steals per game. He has earned All-NBA honors 11 times (2008, 2009, 2011–2016, 2020, 2021, 2022), All-Defensive honors nine times (2008, 2009, 2011–2017), and led the NBA in steals a record six times (2008, 2009, 2011–2014) and in assists five times (2008, 2009, 2014, 2015, 2022). In 2013, he was ranked as the third-best player in the league by ESPN and Sports Illustrated. In his 2014 NBA preview, ESPN's Kevin Pelton called Paul the league's best point guard, adding, "a title he's held throughout his career when healthy." In 2022, to commemorate the NBA's 75th Anniversary The Athletic ranked their top 75 players of all time, and named Paul as the 30th-greatest player in NBA history.

Paul preferred playing in the half court versus playing up-tempo. He created scoring opportunities by constantly changing speeds; upon beating his defender one-on-one or shedding him in the pick-and-roll, he would often slow down and box him out, denying him from regaining front side position and forcing the defense to help at all times. His ability to penetrate deep into the paint led to easy shots for his teammates, and in 2013, he was second in the league in assisted three-pointers. As a playmaker, he was noted for his consistently high assist-to-turnover ratio, averaging just 2.4 turnovers per game over his career. A deft midrange shooter, he was especially proficient from the right elbow, leading the league in shooting percentage from that area in 2015. On defense, he aggravated opponents with active hands and high effort and was ranked as one of the best perimeter defenders in the NBA.

== Off the court ==
Paul is regularly ranked as one of the highest-paid athletes in the world by Forbes. Some of the companies that he has done business with include Nike and State Farm. For a State Farm ad campaign, he portrayed a fictional twin brother named Cliff Paul. Paul was also the cover athlete for the video game NBA 2K8.

Paul was selected president of the National Basketball Players Association (NBPA) on August 21, 2013, after having served on the executive committee for four years. He was a key figure in the banning of Clippers owner Donald Sterling from the NBA following racist remarks Sterling made in 2014. In one interview, Paul mentioned a possible boycott if Sterling continued to own the team. Paul also played a significant role in the election of Michele Roberts as the Executive Director of the Players Association, giving a strong recommendation to the executive committee responsible for filling the position. On August 7, 2021, Paul's tenure as president ended when CJ McCollum was elected to the position.

Paul is part owner of The Soccer Tournament.

=== Personal life ===
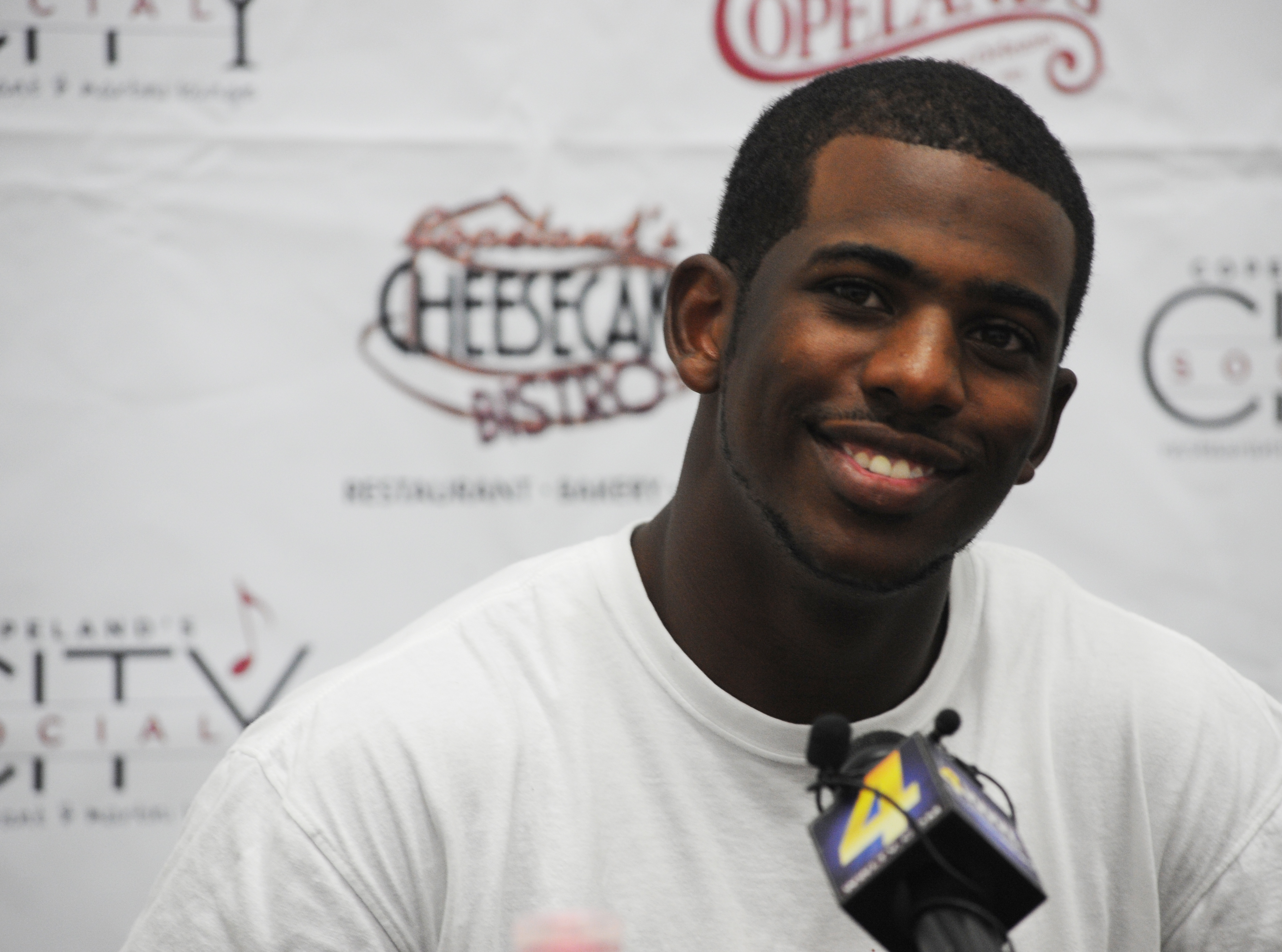
Paul answers questions at a youth basketball camp in July 2009.

Paul married his college sweetheart, Jada Crawley, on September 10, 2011. Together they have two children. The family lives in a Mediterranean-style mansion in Bel Air, which Paul bought from Avril Lavigne for $8.5 million in 2012. On November 11, 2011, Paul appeared with his family on Family Feud.

Paul is a Baptist. In a 2008 interview, Paul said that he is a Christian and attends church on Sunday when he can. He is a bowler and owns a franchise in the Professional Bowlers Association (PBA) League called L.A.X. He has hosted and participated in numerous celebrity and youth bowling events as the head of the CP3 Foundation, which benefits programs in Louisiana affected by Hurricane Katrina, as well as charities in Winston-Salem. In 2018, Paul purchased a minority ownership stake in the Winston-Salem Dash, a minor league baseball team located in his hometown.

Paul's brother, C.J., played college basketball at Hampton University and University of South Carolina Upstate. In 2004, they played against each other when Wake Forest had a preseason exhibition with USC Upstate. C.J. now works as Chris's personal manager. Paul is also close friends with football player Reggie Bush; the two once lived in the One River Place complex in the New Orleans Central Business District while Bush was playing for the New Orleans Saints. They also shared a personal chef.

Paul has been a vegan since 2019 and is a brand ambassador for Beyond Meat. Paul is also in partnership with Gopuff, with the intentions to expand the latter's selection of plant-based foods and products, particularly those made and distributed by black- and brown-owned businesses.

In December 2022, Chris Paul graduated from Winston-Salem State University with his bachelor's degree in communications.

In June 2023, Chris Paul published a memoir, titled Sixty One: Life Lessons from Papa, On and Off the Court. The book recalls Paul's childhood in Winston-Salem, North Carolina, his relationship with his grandfather Nathaniel "Papa" Jones and his family, his high school and Wake Forest University basketball careers, and stories from his professional NBA career.

== Awards and honors ==
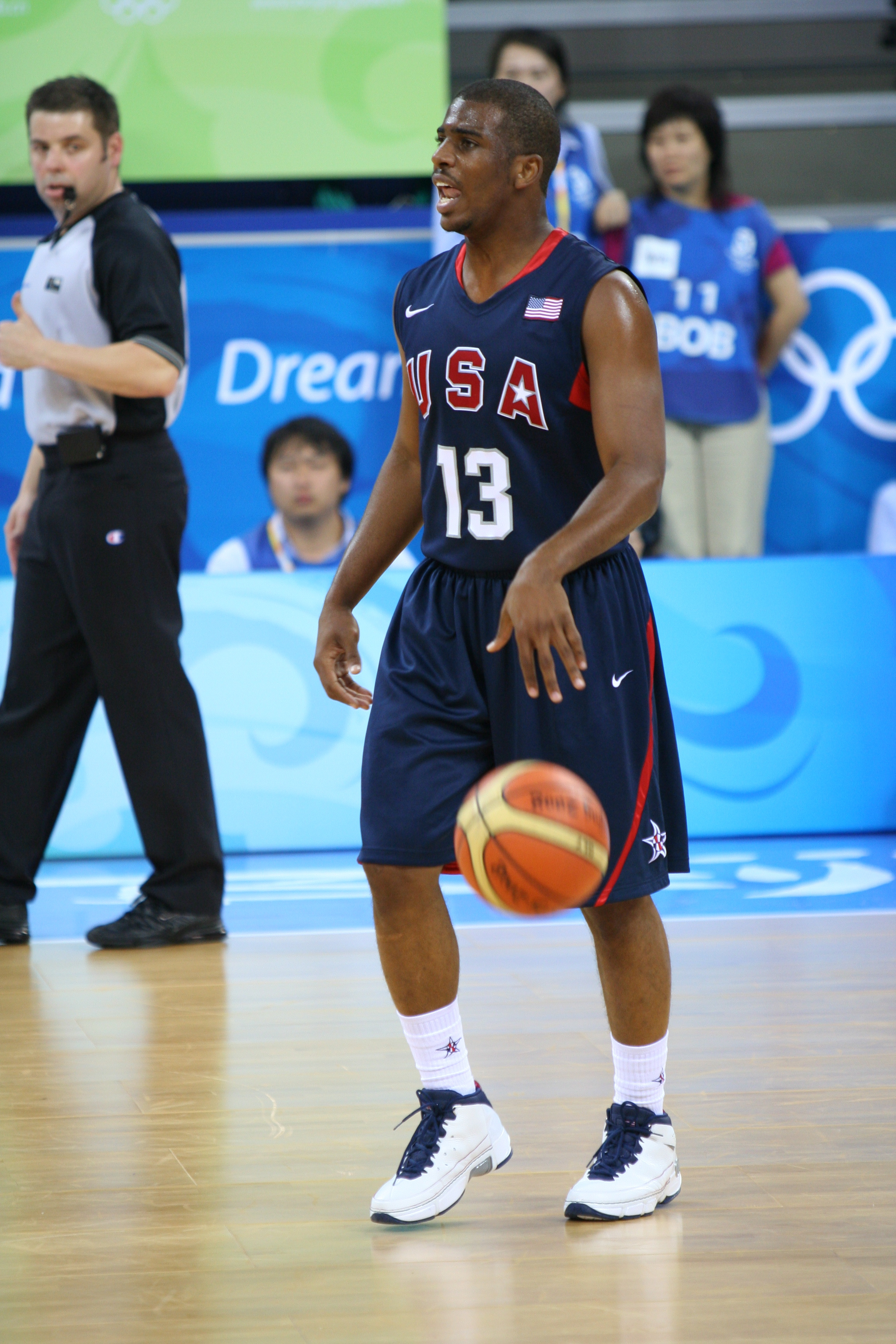
Paul runs the offense at the 2008 Olympics in Beijing

NBA

- 12× NBA All-Star: 2008, 2009, 2010, 2011, 2012, 2013, 2014, 2015, 2016, 2020, 2021, 2022
- NBA All-Star Game MVP Award: 2013
- 11× All-NBA Team:
  - First Team: 2008, 2012, 2013, 2014
  - Second Team: 2009, 2015, 2016, 2020, 2021
  - Third Team: 2011, 2022
- 9× NBA All-Defensive Team:
  - First Team: 2009, 2012, 2013, 2014, 2015, 2016, 2017
  - Second Team: 2008, 2011
- NBA Rookie of the Year: 2006
- NBA All-Rookie First Team: 2006
- 5× NBA assists leader: 2008, 2009, 2014, 2015, 2022
- 6× NBA steals leader: 2008, 2009, 2011, 2012, 2013, 2014
- NBA free-throw percentage leader: 2021
- Season-long NBA Community Assist Award: 2019–20
- NBA 75th Anniversary Team

College

- First team consensus All-American: 2005
- No. 3 retired by Wake Forest
- 2× All-ACC Team:
  - All-ACC First Team: 2005
  - All-ACC Third Team: 2004
- All-ACC Defensive Team: 2004
- All-ACC Freshman Team: 2004
- ACC Rookie of the Year: 2004
- All-ACC Tournament Second Team: 2004

USA Basketball

- 2x Olympics gold medalist: 2008, 2012
- FIBA World Championship bronze medalist: 2006
- USA Basketball Male Athlete of the Year: 2004

== Career statistics ==
Legend
GP	Games played	GS	Games started	MPG	Minutes per game
FG%	Field goal percentage	3P%	3-point field goal percentage	FT%	Free throw percentage
RPG	Rebounds per game	APG	Assists per game	SPG	Steals per game
BPG	Blocks per game	PPG	Points per game	**Bold**	Career high
*	Led the league	‡	NBA record

=== NBA ===
==== Regular season ====
Year	Team	GP	GS	MPG	FG%	3P%	FT%	RPG	APG	SPG	BPG	PPG
2005–06	New Orleans	78	78	36.0	.430	.282	.847	5.1	7.8	2.2	.1	16.1
2006–07	New Orleans	64	64	36.8	.437	.350	.818	4.4	8.9	1.8	.0	17.3
2007–08	New Orleans	80	80	37.6	.488	.369	.851	4.0	**11.6***	2.7*	.1	21.1
2008–09	New Orleans	78	78	**38.5**	**.503**	.364	.868	**5.5**	11.0*	**2.8***	.1	**22.8**
2009–10	New Orleans	45	45	38.1	.493	.409	.847	4.2	10.7	2.1	.2	18.7
2010–11	New Orleans	80	80	36.0	.463	.388	.878	4.1	9.8	2.4*	.1	15.9
2011–12	L.A. Clippers	60	60	36.3	.478	.371	.861	3.6	9.1	2.5*	.1	19.8
2012–13	L.A. Clippers	70	70	33.4	.481	.328	.885	3.7	9.7	2.4*	.1	16.9
2013–14	L.A. Clippers	62	62	35.0	.467	.368	.855	4.3	10.7*	2.5*	.1	19.1
2014–15	L.A. Clippers	**82**	**82***	34.8	.485	.398	.900	4.6	10.2*	1.9	.2	19.1
2015–16	L.A. Clippers	74	74	32.7	.462	.371	.896	4.2	10.0	2.1	.2	19.5
2016–17	L.A. Clippers	61	61	31.5	.476	**.411**	.892	5.0	9.2	2.0	.1	18.1
2017–18	Houston	58	58	31.8	.460	.380	.919	5.4	7.9	1.7	.2	18.6
2018–19	Houston	58	58	32.0	.419	.358	.862	4.6	8.2	2.0	.3	15.6
2019–20	Oklahoma City	70	70	31.5	.489	.365	.907	5.0	6.7	1.6	.2	17.6
2020–21	Phoenix	70	70	31.4	.499	.395	**.934***	4.5	8.9	1.4	.3	16.4
2021–22	Phoenix	65	65	32.9	.493	.317	.837	4.4	10.8*	1.9	.3	14.7
2022–23	Phoenix	59	59	32.0	.440	.375	.831	4.3	8.9	1.5	**.4**	13.9
2023–24	Golden State	58	18	26.4	.441	.371	.827	3.9	6.8	1.2	.1	9.2
2024–25	San Antonio	**82***	**82***	28.0	.427	.377	.924	3.6	7.4	1.3	.3	8.8
2025–26	L.A. Clippers	16	0	14.3	.321	.333	.500	1.8	3.3	.7	.0	2.9
Career		1,370	1,314	33.5	.469	.370	.870	4.4	9.2	2.0	.2	16.8
All-Star		11	4	24.8	.525	.468	.857	3.9	11.6‡	2.4	.0	12.2

==== Playoffs ====
Year	Team	GP	GS	MPG	FG%	3P%	FT%	RPG	APG	SPG	BPG	PPG
2008	New Orleans	12	12	40.5	.502	.238	.785	4.9	11.3	2.3	.2	24.1
2009	New Orleans	5	5	40.2	.411	.313	.857	4.4	10.4	1.6	.0	16.6
2011	New Orleans	6	6	**41.7**	.545	**.474**	.796	6.7	**11.5**	1.8	.0	22.0
2012	L.A. Clippers	11	11	38.5	.427	.333	.872	5.1	7.9	2.7	.1	17.6
2013	L.A. Clippers	6	6	37.3	.533	.316	.892	4.0	6.3	1.8	.0	22.8
2014	L.A. Clippers	13	13	36.3	.467	.457	.774	4.2	10.3	**2.8**	.0	19.8
2015	L.A. Clippers	12	12	37.1	.503	.415	.941	4.4	8.8	1.8	.3	22.1
2016	L.A. Clippers	4	4	31.3	.487	.300	**1.000**	4.0	7.3	2.3	.0	23.8
2017	L.A. Clippers	7	7	37.1	.496	.368	.879	5.0	9.9	1.7	.1	**25.3**
2018	Houston	15	15	34.5	.459	.374	.830	5.9	5.8	2.0	.3	21.1
2019	Houston	11	11	36.1	.446	.270	.844	6.4	5.5	2.2	.6	17.0
2020	Oklahoma City	7	7	37.3	.491	.372	.885	**7.4**	5.3	1.6	.4	21.3
2021	Phoenix	**20**	**20**	34.2	.497	.446	.877	3.5	8.6	1.2	.2	19.2
2022	Phoenix	13	13	34.5	**.561**	.388	.946	4.2	8.3	1.5	.2	17.5
2023	Phoenix	7	7	35.8	.418	.321	.500	5.0	7.4	1.7	**.7**	12.4
Career		149	149	36.5	.484	.373	.854	4.9	8.3	1.9	.2	20.0

=== College ===
Year	Team	GP	GS	MPG	FG%	3P%	FT%	RPG	APG	SPG	BPG	PPG
2003–04	Wake Forest	31	31	**33.6**	**.496**	.465	**.843**	3.3	5.9	**2.7**	**.4**	14.8
2004–05	Wake Forest	**32**	**32**	33.4	.451	**.474**	.834	**4.5**	**6.6**	2.4	.0	**15.3**
Career		63	63	33.5	.472	.470	.838	3.9	6.3	2.5	.2	15.0

== Filmography ==
Film and television roles
Year	Title	Role	Notes
2015	Jessie	Himself	Episode: "Basket Case"
2019	Scooby-Doo and Guess Who?	Himself (voice)	Episode: "Revenge of the Swamp Monster"
2021	Blaze and the Monster Machines	Swift Paul (Voice)	Episode: "The Gold Medal Games"
2025	Sneaks	Himself (voice)	

== See also ==
- List of NBA career scoring leaders
- List of NBA franchise career scoring leaders
- List of NBA career assists leaders
- List of NBA career steals leaders
- List of NBA career turnovers leaders
- List of NBA career 3-point scoring leaders
- List of NBA career free throw scoring leaders
- List of NBA career free throw percentage leaders
- List of NBA career minutes played leaders
- List of NBA career games played leaders
- List of NBA career playoff assists leaders
- List of NBA career playoff steals leaders
- List of NBA career playoff 3-point scoring leaders
- List of NBA career playoff triple-double leaders
- List of NBA annual assists leaders
- List of NBA annual steals leaders
- List of NBA annual free throw percentage leaders
- List of NBA single-game steals leaders
