= National Basketball Players Association =

North American labor union

NBPA
- National Basketball Players Association
- Founded: 1954; 72 years ago
- Type: Trade union
- Headquarters: 1133 Avenue of the Americas, New York, NY
- Location: United States
- Members: 450 (2024)
- Executive Director: David Kelly
- President: Fred VanVleet
- Board of directors: Executive Committee
- Main organ: Board of Player Representatives
- Website: nbpa.com

The National Basketball Players Association (NBPA) is the labor union that represents National Basketball Association (NBA) players. It was founded in 1954, making it the oldest trade union of the four major professional sports leagues in the United States and Canada. However, the NBPA was not recognized by NBA team owners until ten years later. Its offices are in the historic Park and Tilford Building in New York City. It was briefly a trade association after dissolving as a union during the 2011 NBA lockout.

== History ==
=== Founding and struggle for recognition (1954–1957) ===
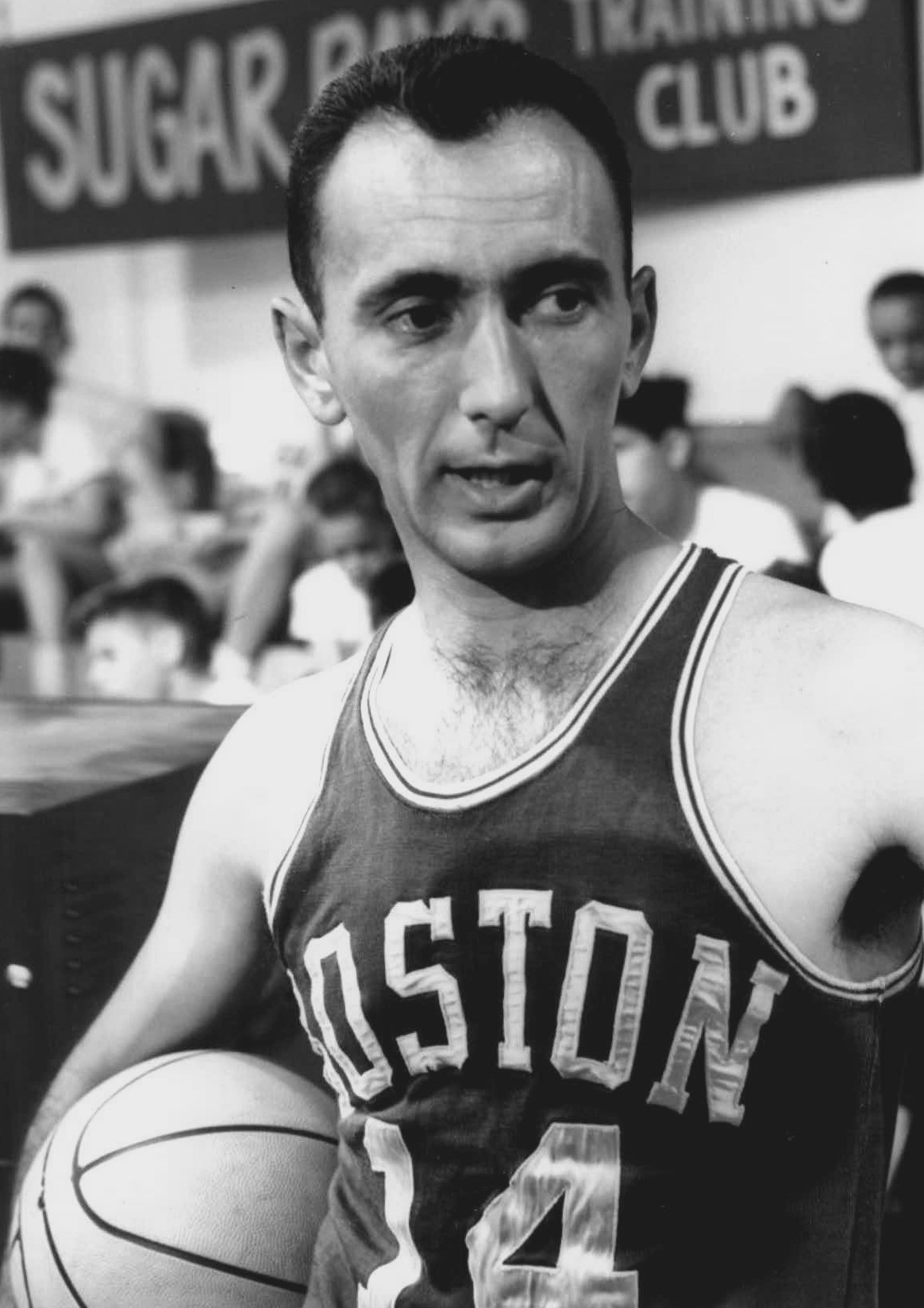
Bob Cousy

In 1954, Celtics star point guard Bob Cousy and friend and unofficial agent Joe Sharry canvassed long-tenured players on each of the league's teams by mail, including the fledgling NBA's stars Paul Arizin and Dolph Schayes, and received support from the majority to approach the NBA president Maurice Podoloff. Cousy and the players sought basic improvements of conditions including being paid for promotional activities, a limit of twenty exhibition games per season, impartial dispute arbitration, and moving expenses for traded players. While Podoloff granted back pay for players of folded franchises, the NBA refused to acknowledge the players association or make other changes until Cousy approached the AFL-CIO in 1957 and the players threatened a strike.

=== Recognition, early successes, stalled negotiations (1957–1964) ===
After formal recognition by the NBA, the NBPA won its players per diem payments and travel expenses and an increase in the playoff pool payment, and the majority of the previously demanded conditions. In 1958, however, dismayed at the lack of dues payments by players, Cousy would resign his position out of frustration. He was succeeded by Celtics second-year player Tom Heinsohn, who had studied labor relations at university and worked as a pension planner for an insurance company in his day job, and whose father was a union official in Union City, New Jersey. Heinsohn began negotiating a pension plan for players, asking $100 per month for five years of service and $200 per month for 10 years of service for players aged over 65. Negotiations stalled with new NBA President Walter Kennedy and the NBP and the league entered a stalemate for most of 1964.

=== 1964 All-Star game strike ===
At the 1964 NBA All-Star Game in Boston, Heinsohn organised a wildcat strike to force the NBA owners to recognise the union's demands. The game was to be the struggling NBA's first live television broadcast, and the league had to this point ignored the NBPA's demands delivered to league offices during the NBA off-season, and repeatedly refusing to meet with or acknowledge executive director Larry Fleisher as the union's authorized bargaining agent. The NBPA presented the assembled team owners with a list of demands to be met before the All Star game would be played: the pension plan, athletic trainers for every team, and the removal of matinee Sunday games after Saturday night games from the schedule. After 22 minutes of the players holding out in a locker room, the door of which was guarded by a Boston police officer and with owners threatening the players with blacklisting and punishment, league commissioner Walter Kennedy agreed to the player's demands, and the live broadcast went to air after a slight delay.

=== Salary cap ===
In 1983, players and owners reached a historic agreement, that introduced the "salary cap" era into professional sports. This was the first salary cap in any major professional sports league in the United States. (source: )

=== 1995 NBA labor dispute ===
The NBA experienced its first work stoppage, when owners imposed a lockout, that lasted from July 1 through September 12, when players and owners reached an agreement. Because the lockout took place during the off-season, no games were lost.

=== 1998–99 lockout ===
The second NBA lockout, which ran into the 1998–99 season, lasted almost 200 days, and wiped out 464 regular-season games. After players and owners reached an agreement, the season did not start until February 5, 1999, with each of the 29 NBA teams playing a 50-game schedule.

=== 2011 lockout ===
The current collective bargaining agreement was reached in July 2005, and expired at 12:01 EST on July 1, 2011, following completion of the 2010–11 NBA season, resulting in a lockout, similar to the 2011 NFL lockout. ESPN has reported that the owners and players failed to reach an agreement and broke off negotiations, and that the owners began a lockout immediately after the collective bargaining agreement expired.

The primary sticking point within negotiations was the shares of Basketball Related income, player movement and the soft salary cap. Basketball Related Income or BRI is profits from ticket sales, merchandising sales, and other profits related to basketball, this revenue is split between players and the team but in initial negotiations the teams proposed a reduction players' share being from 57% to 50%. As well, with the forming of Big Three (Miami Heat) and increased player movement towards larger market teams. This concerned smaller market teams and encouraged them to establish a hard salary cap.

On November 14, the NBPA was converted from a union into a trade association, enabling the players as individual employees to be represented by lawyers in a class action antitrust lawsuit against the league, calling the lockout an illegal group boycott. The NBPA re-formed as a union on December 1, receiving support from over 300 players, exceeding the requirement for at least 260. After the players and owners reached a new agreement, the lockout ended on December 8 and the 2011–12 season began on December 25 with a 66-game schedule.

=== 2013–present ===
In February 2013, Billy Hunter was ousted unanimously as executive director of the National Basketball Players Association (NBPA) amid charges of nepotism and other concerns. 17 months later on July 29, 2014, Michele Roberts, a Washington, D.C. litigator, was elected as the new executive director of the National Basketball Players Association. She became the first female executive director of NBPA and the first woman to head a major professional sports union in North America. She would help avoid an opt-out labor dispute from occurring in 2017 with negotiations taking place early in 2016.

In February 2018 at All-Star Weekend, the NBPA unveiled its new marketing and licensing arm, THINK450, the innovation engine of the NBPA. The union controls the intellectual property rights of the 450 players as a group off the court, giving way for brand partnerships and sponsorship opportunities.

After the season had been suspended earlier in the year, on June 5, 2020, the NBPA approved negotiations with the NBA to resume the regular season for 22 teams in the NBA Bubble.

During the 2020 NBA Finals, NBPA President Chris Paul announced that over 90% of NBA players had registered to vote for the 2020 presidential election. He also stated that 15 teams in the league were 100% registered to vote. By contrast, the league only had 20% of players registered to vote in the 2016 presidential election. The players took multiple actions in the NBA Bubble: writing phrases or names on the back of their jerseys to support the Black Lives Matter movement, boycotting games in response to the shooting of Jacob Blake, and taking a knee during the national anthem to protest against racial inequality and police brutality.

== Leadership ==
=== Executive directors ===
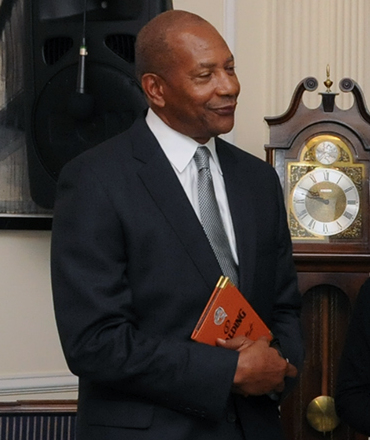
Alex English was interim executive director in 1996.

- Larry Fleisher (1970–1988)
- Charles Grantham (1988–1995)
- Simon Gourdine (1995–1996)
- Alex English (1996, interim)
- Billy Hunter (1996–2013)
- Michele Roberts (2014–2021)
- Tamika Tremaglio (2021–2023)
- Andre Iguodala (2023–2026)
- David Kelly (2026–present)

=== Presidents ===
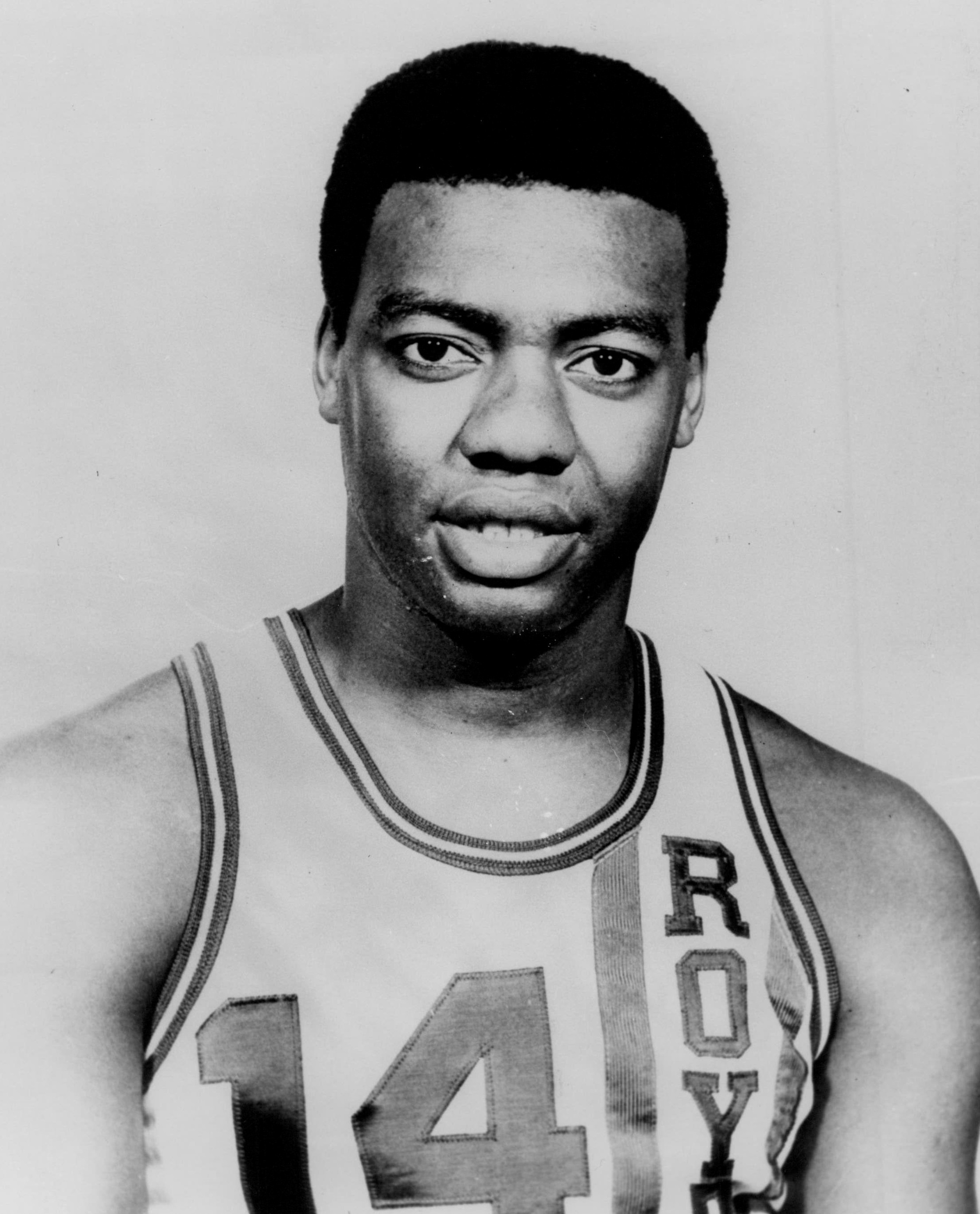
Oscar Robertson served the longest tenure as president, 1965–1974.

- Bob Cousy (1954–1958)
- Tom Heinsohn (1958–1965)
- Oscar Robertson (1965–1974)
- Paul Silas (1974–1980)
- Bob Lanier (1980–1985)
- Junior Bridgeman (1985 – February 1988)
- Alex English (February 1988 – October 5, 1988)
- Isiah Thomas (October 5, 1988 – February 13, 1994)
- Buck Williams (February 13, 1994 – September 15, 1997)
- Patrick Ewing (September 15, 1997 – July 10, 2001)
- Michael Curry (July 10, 2001 – June 28, 2005)
- Antonio Davis (June 28, 2005 – November 19, 2006)
- Derek Fisher (November 19, 2006 – August 21, 2013)
- Chris Paul (August 21, 2013 – August 7, 2021)
- CJ McCollum (August 7, 2021 – July 12, 2025)
- Fred VanVleet (July 12, 2025 – present)

=== Vice presidents ===
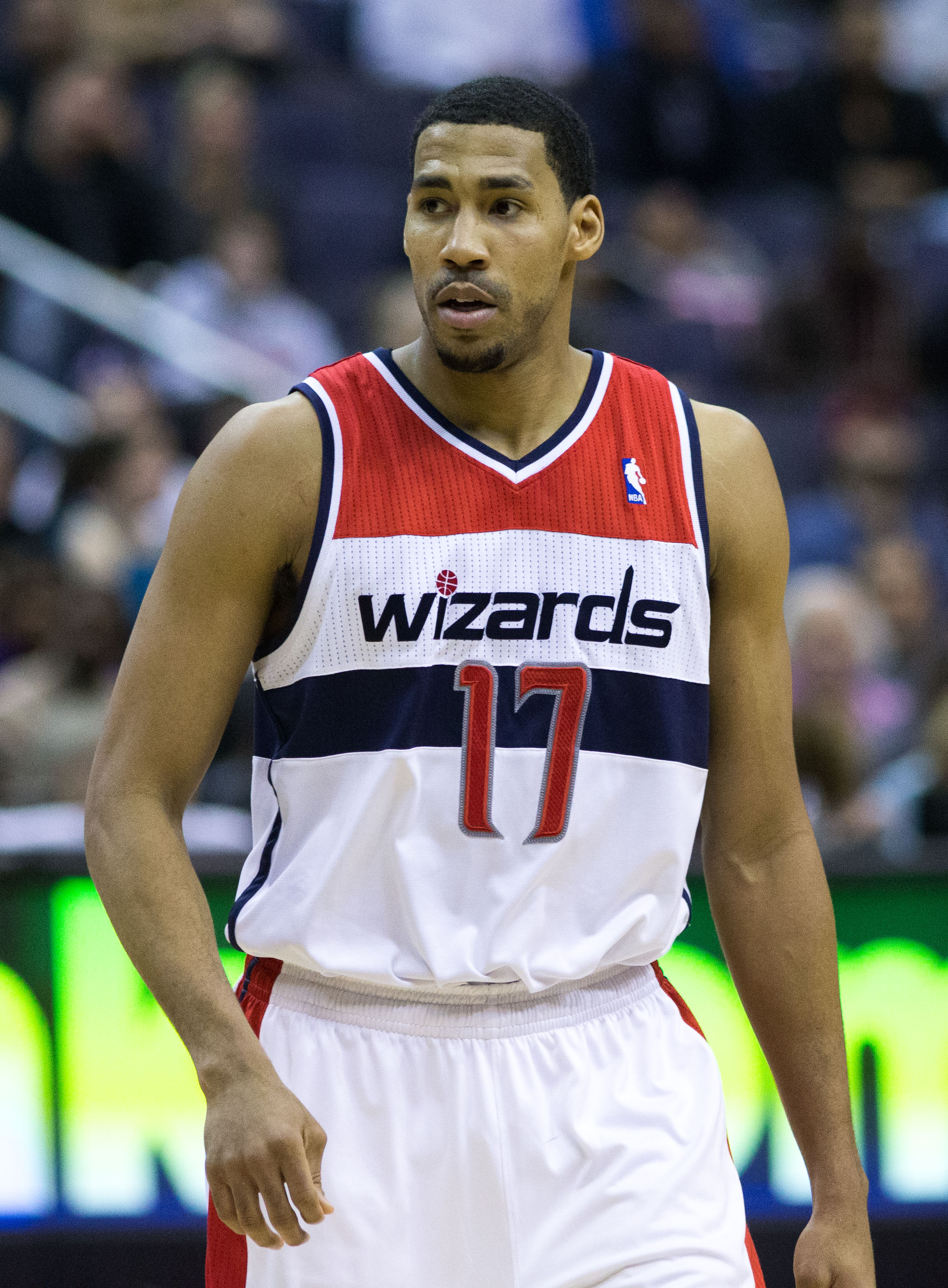
Garrett Temple has been a vice president since 2017.

Past

- Roger Mason Jr. (August 21, 2013 – June 23, 2017)
- Steve Blake (August 21, 2013 – June 23, 2017)
- Kyle Korver (February 12, 2016 – June 23, 2017)
- Carmelo Anthony (June 23, 2017 – February 18, 2019)
- Stephen Curry (June 23, 2017 – February 18, 2019)
- Pau Gasol (June 23, 2017 – February 17, 2020)
- LeBron James (June 23, 2017 – February 2, 2020)
- CJ McCollum (February 18, 2018 – August 7, 2021)
- Andre Iguodala (June 23, 2017 – February 18, 2023)
- Kyrie Irving (February 17, 2020 – February 18, 2023)
- Malcolm Brogdon (February 18, 2019 – February 16, 2025)
- Bismack Biyombo (February 18, 2019 – February 16, 2025)

Current

- Garrett Temple (June 23, 2017 – present)
- Jaylen Brown (February 18, 2019 – present)
- Grant Williams† (August 7, 2021 – present)
- Jaren Jackson Jr. (February 18, 2023 – present)
- Donovan Mitchell (February 18, 2023 – present)
- Karl-Anthony Towns (February 16, 2025 - present)
- Gabe Vincent (February 16, 2025 - present)

† First vice president

=== Secretary-treasurers ===
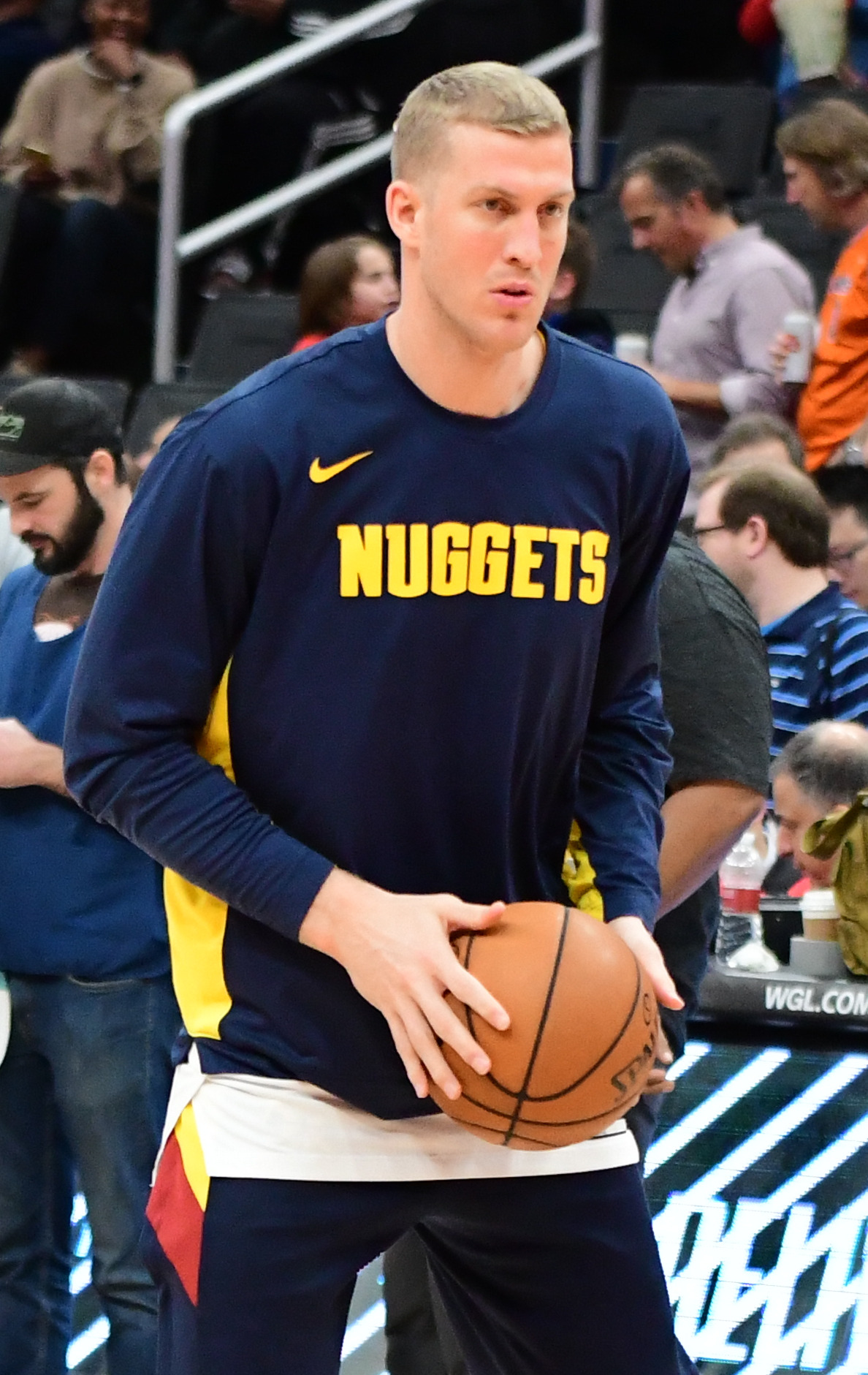
Mason Plumlee is the current secretary-treasurer.

- James Jones (c. 2014 – July 18, 2017)
- Anthony Tolliver (February 17, 2018 – March 5, 2021)
- Harrison Barnes (March 5, 2021 – July 13, 2024)
- Mason Plumlee (July 13, 2024 – present)

== Initiatives ==
The NBPA organizes Sportscaster U., an annual broadcasting training camp at Syracuse University in association with the S. I. Newhouse School of Public Communications. In past ten years, hundreds of NBA players have attended this camp, and went on to successful careers in broadcasting.

== See also ==
- Major League Baseball Players Association
- National Football League Players Association
- MLS Players Association
- National Hockey League Players' Association
