= Sportscaster U. =

Broadcasting Training Camp

- Genre: executive education Broadcasting training
- Frequency: Annually
- Venue: S.I. Newhouse School of Public Communications
- Locations: Syracuse, New York
- Country: U.S.
- Years active: 17–18
- Inaugurated: 2008
- Leader: Matt Park
- Sponsor: NBPA & the Newhouse School

Sportscaster U. is a broadcasting training camp held by National Basketball Players Association (NBPA) in association with the S.I. Newhouse School of Public Communications at Syracuse University. The main goal of the camp is to help transition former or current National Basketball Association (NBA) athletes to broadcasting jobs through seminars, presentations and experience in front of television cameras.

Sportscaster U. started in 2008 and is headed by Syracuse University professor and Syracuse Orange color commentator Matt Park. During the four day long camp, players go through components such as, appearing on multiple television and radio segments, learning about and leading the production meetings, understanding the business side of the industry, and hearing from guest speakers.

== Attendees ==
Around sixty players have attended the camp. Some of the notable attendees are Charles Barkley, Shaquille O'Neal, Shaun Livingston, Andre Iguodala, Matt Carroll, Ryan Hollins, Tony Battie, Casey Jacobsen, Adrian Griffin, Eric Snow, Samaki Walker, Acie Law, Tiago Splitter, Tobias Harris, Danny Granger and Richard Hamilton.

In 2017 camp, list of attendees include Langston Galloway, Willie Reed, Loren Woods, Earl Barron, Steve Novak, Danny Green and Gerald Henderson.
