= Larry Fleisher =

American attorney and sports agent

Lawrence Fleisher (September 26, 1930 – May 4, 1989) was an American attorney and sports agent.

Born in The Bronx, New York, Fleisher, a 1953 graduate of Harvard Law School, at the request of professional basketball player Tom Heinsohn, helped found the National Basketball Association Players’ Association, of which he would serve as president from 1962 to 1968, during which time pensions, minimum salaries, and disability pay were secured for the membership.

For 19 additional years, Fleisher would continue to serve, without salary, as general counsel for the Players’ Association, arguing before U.S. Congress and the National Labor Relations Board to gain players the right of free agency, which right was eventually won in 1976.

Having guided players to the American Basketball Association in the late 1960s, Fleisher later helped broker the merger between the ABA and NBA and worked to set up relationships between the NBA and professional leagues in Europe and South America; he would represent little-known foreign players as well as established American stars, including Bill Bradley, John Havlicek, Bob Lanier, Willis Reed, and Jerry West, and, in an effort to promote basketball globally, would lead his clients on playing tours to Europe, South America, and Asia.

Prior to his 1987 retirement, Fleisher helped broker a labor agreement that installed a salary cap on NBA franchises and provided for penalties for players caught using hard drugs.

He died from a heart attack after playing squash at the New York Athletic Club.

In recognition of his achievements in the game of basketball, Fleisher was inducted into the Basketball Hall of Fame as a contributor in 1991.

== Sources ==
- Thomas, Robert Mcg. Jr. (May 5, 1989). "Larry Fleisher, 58, Former Head Of Pro Basketball Players' Union". The New York Times.
