= Steve Novak =

American basketball player (born 1983)

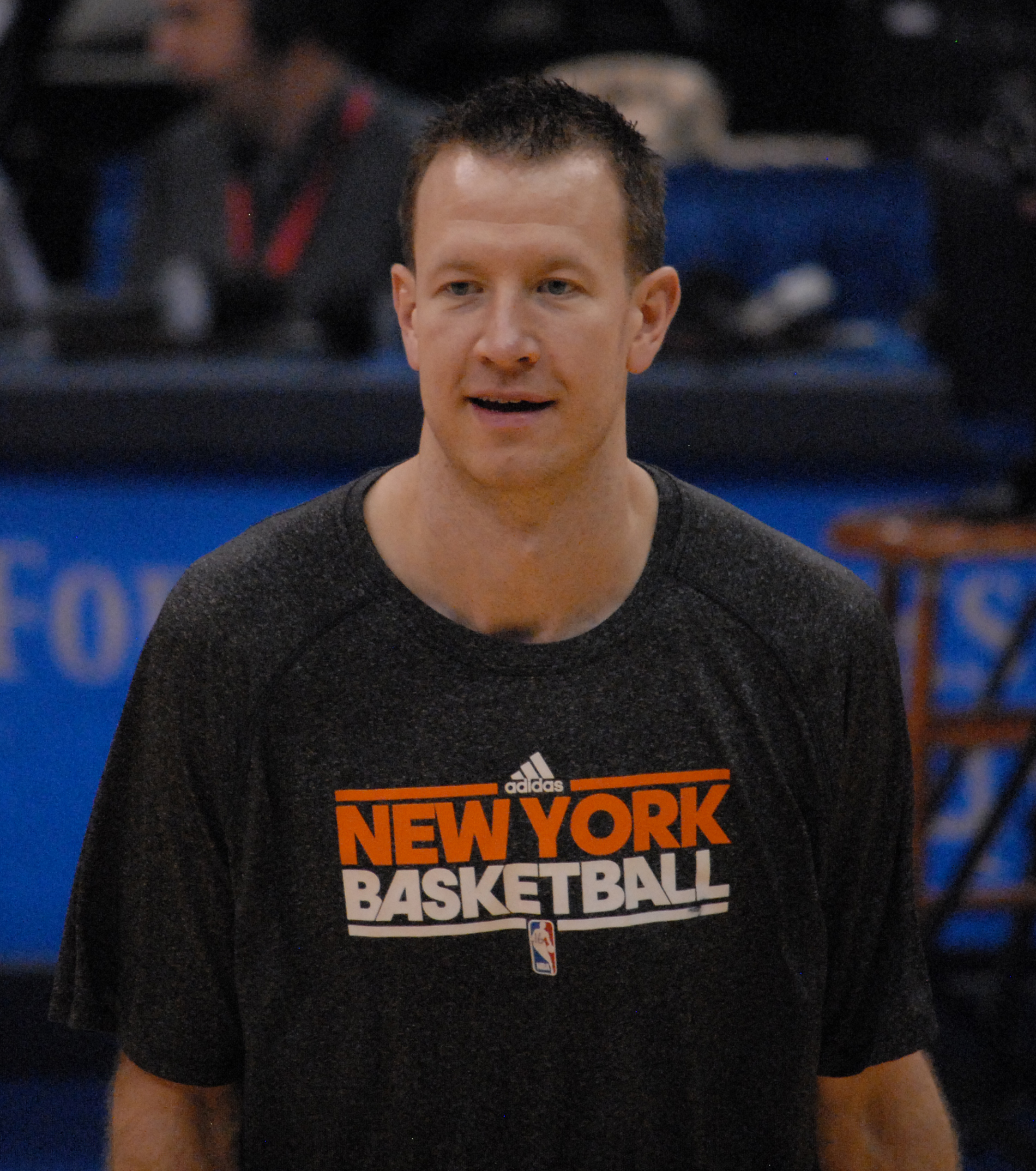
- Novak with the New York Knicks in 2012

Personal information
- Born: June 13, 1983 (age 43) Libertyville, Illinois, U.S.
- Listed height: 6 ft 10 in (2.08 m)
- Listed weight: 225 lb (102 kg)

Career information
- High school: Brown Deer (Brown Deer, Wisconsin)
- College: Marquette (2002–2006)
- NBA draft: 2006: 2nd round, 32nd overall pick
- Drafted by: Houston Rockets
- Playing career: 2006–2017
- Position: Power forward / small forward
- Number: 20, 21, 23, 16, 6

Career history
- 2006–2008: Houston Rockets
- 2007: →Rio Grande Valley Vipers
- 2008–2010: Los Angeles Clippers
- 2010–2011: Dallas Mavericks
- 2011: Reno Bighorns
- 2011: San Antonio Spurs
- 2011–2013: New York Knicks
- 2013–2014: Toronto Raptors
- 2014–2015: Utah Jazz
- 2015–2016: Oklahoma City Thunder
- 2016–2017: Milwaukee Bucks

Career highlights
- First-team All-Big East (2006); C-USA Sixth Man of the Year (2003); C-USA All-Freshman Team (2003); Fourth-team Parade All-American (2002)

Career NBA statistics
- Points: 2,177 (4.7 ppg)
- Rebounds: 591 (1.3 rpg)
- Assists: 132 (0.3 apg)
- Stats at NBA.com
- Stats at Basketball Reference

Steven Michael Novak (born June 13, 1983) is an American former professional basketball player who is currently a television analyst for the New York Knicks on MSG Networks. He is listed as 6'10", 225 lbs. He played college basketball for the Marquette Golden Eagles. Novak split time at both small forward and power forward. He was the NBA regular season leader in three point percentage during the 2011–12 season.

== High school career ==
Born in Libertyville, Illinois, Novak attended Brown Deer High School in Brown Deer, Wisconsin. As a junior, he averaged 22.2 points, 12.0 rebounds, and 3.4 blocked shots per game. During his senior season as a 6'9 205 lbs Forward, Novak averaged 20.6 points, 10.4 rebounds, and 5.0 assists per game. Throughout his high school basketball career, he earned four letters. In 2002, Novak was named the Wisconsin High School Boys' Basketball Player of the Year.

Considered a four-star recruit by Scout.com, Novak was listed as the No. 17 small forward and the No. 62 player in the nation in 2002.

== College career ==
Novak began his college basketball career at Marquette University in 2002–03. He saw action in all 33 games and averaged 6.7 points per game. He wore jersey number 20. He also shot 50.5% from the three-point line. As a freshman, Novak played in the Final Four, alongside future NBA players Dwyane Wade and Travis Diener.

Novak started 29 of the 32 games in the 2003–04 season. He averaged 12.5 points per game along with 4.6 rebounds per game. Novak also shot 91.2% from the free throw line.

During the 2004–05 season, Novak started 29 of the 31 games. He improved his average to 13.5 points per game and also was third on the team with 4.1 rebounds per game.

The 2005–06 season saw an overall improvement in Novak's game. He led the team in points per game by averaging 17.5. In addition to this he averaged 5.9 rebounds per game and shot 97.4% from the foul line. Novak's top performances included a 41-point, 16-rebound effort in Marquette's 94–79 upset of then #2 UConn in Marquette's inaugural Big East contest, and a game-winning 18-foot jumper with 1.1 seconds left to cap a 28-point effort in a 67–65 victory over Notre Dame.

In March 2006, Novak competed and won the ESPN college three-point shooting contest at Hinkle Field House in Indianapolis, Indiana.

He graduated with a BA in Communication studies from Marquette University.

== Professional career ==
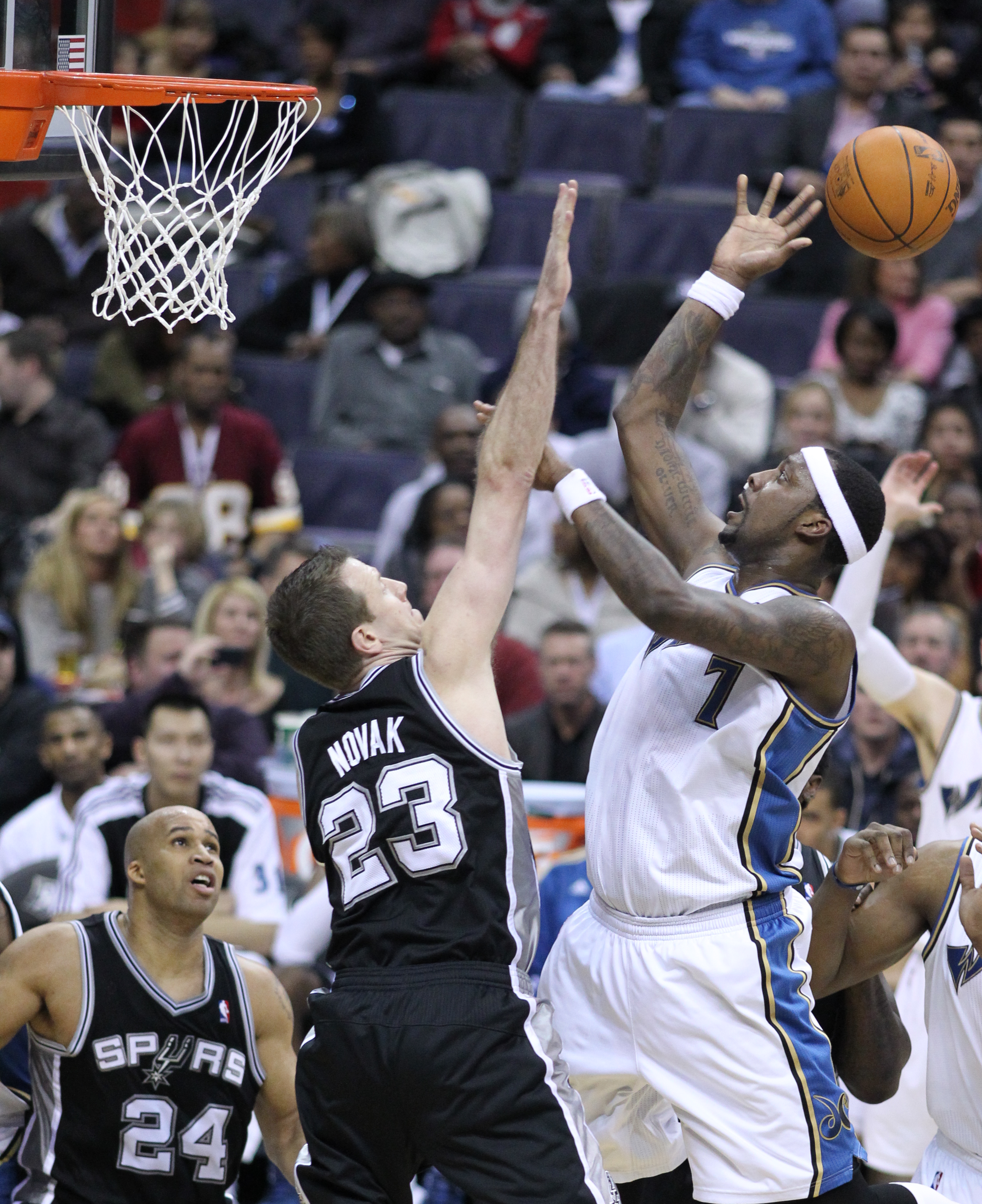
Novak (No. 23) with the San Antonio Spurs defending Andray Blatche in 2011.

=== Houston Rockets (2006–2008) ===
On June 28, 2006, Novak was selected with the 32nd overall pick of the 2006 NBA draft by the Houston Rockets. He ended his rookie season (2006–07) with averages of 1.5 points and 0.7 rebounds in 5.5 minutes per game. He was not active on the Houston Rockets' playoff roster.

During the 2007–08 season, Novak was assigned to the Rio Grande Valley Vipers, an NBA Development League team. On December 16, 2007, the Rockets recalled him from the Development League, where he had spent a month.

On February 13, 2008, Novak scored a game winning 3-pointer vs. the Sacramento Kings to win the game 89–87 with 2.5 seconds left, keeping the Rockets' historic 22-game winning streak alive. It was his only basket of the game.

=== Los Angeles Clippers (2008–2010) ===
On August 6, 2008, the Rockets traded Novak to the Los Angeles Clippers for the option to exchange second round draft picks in the 2011 NBA draft. On March 15, 2009, Novak hit a 3-pointer at the buzzer to beat the New Jersey Nets, 107–105.

=== Dallas Mavericks (2010–2011) ===
On September 22, 2010, Novak signed a free agent deal with the Dallas Mavericks. On January 5, 2011, he was released by the team.

=== San Antonio Spurs (2011) ===
On February 4, 2011, Novak was acquired by the Reno Bighorns of the NBA Development League, but only three days later he was called up by the San Antonio Spurs on a 10-day contract. On February 22, he was signed to a second 10-day contract and on March 4, 2011, the Spurs signed Novak for the rest of the season. Novak was released by the Spurs on December 19.

=== New York Knicks (2011–2013) ===
Novak signed with the New York Knicks for the veteran's minimum of $1.4 million on December 21, 2011. At the end of the 2011-12 NBA season, Novak led the league in 3-point percentage at 47.2% and tied Kevin Durant for third in total 3-point shots made (133). He became an unrestricted free agent at the end of the season. On July 9, 2012, Novak agreed to re-sign with New York for a four-year deal worth $15 million. While playing with New York, Steve Novak accrued a large fanbase. Walt Frazier nicknamed him "Novakaine" after the drug Novocain. Novak competed in the 2012-13 Foot Locker Three-Point Contest during All-Star Weekend. His turnover percentage of 2.63 turnovers committed per 100 plays during the 2012–13 season is the lowest single-season turnover percentage in league history. The NBA did not start recording individual turnovers until the 1977–78 season.

=== Toronto Raptors (2013–2014) ===
On July 10, 2013, Novak, Marcus Camby, Quentin Richardson, a future first round draft pick, and two future second round draft picks were traded from the Knicks to the Toronto Raptors in exchange for Andrea Bargnani.

=== Utah Jazz (2014–2015) ===
On July 10, 2014, Novak was traded, along with a 2017 second round pick, to the Utah Jazz in exchange for Diante Garrett.

=== Oklahoma City Thunder (2015–2016) ===
On February 19, 2015, Novak was traded to the Oklahoma City Thunder in a three-team deal that also involved the Detroit Pistons.

On February 18, 2016, Novak was traded, along with D. J. Augustin, two second-round picks and cash considerations, to the Denver Nuggets in exchange for Randy Foye. He was waived by the Nuggets the next day.

=== Milwaukee Bucks (2016–2017) ===
On February 22, 2016, Novak signed with the Milwaukee Bucks. He appeared in three games for the Bucks before a left knee injury suffered on February 27 against the Detroit Pistons ruled him out for the rest of the season.

On August 29, 2016, Novak re-signed with the Bucks. On February 2, 2017, he was waived by the Bucks.

== Post-retirement ==
Following the end of Novak's playing career, he attended NBPA Sportscaster U. to gauge his skill and interest in broadcasting. Shortly after completing courses at Sportscaster U., then-Bucks' President Peter Feigin offered Novak a role on the Bucks' broadcast team.

On September 20, 2017, it was announced that Novak would be joining Fox Sports Wisconsin as a pre- and post-game analyst for Milwaukee Bucks broadcasts. On occasion, Novak also commentates Wisconsin Herd games, the Bucks' NBA G League team.

On October 30, 2025, MSG Networks released a statement announcing that Novak would be joining the network for Knicks telecasts, filling in for Walt "Clyde" Frazier for select games of the 2025-26 season. Novak replaced Jamal Crawford as Frazier's backup, with Crawford leaving MSG Networks to join NBC in their return to NBA coverage.

== Achievements and awards ==
- 2001–02 – Gatorade Wisconsin High School Boys Basketball Player of the Year
- 2002–03 – Conference USA All-Freshman Team
- 2002–03 – Conference USA Sixth Man of the Year
- 2004 – NIT All-Star Team
- 2005–06 – All-Big East Conference First Team Unanimous Selection
- 2005–06 – NCAA 3-Point Shootout Winner
- 2005–06 – Number 20 retired at Brown Deer High School
- Holds 2nd all-time Marquette career mark for three-point field goals made (354)
- Holds Marquette record with 68 consecutive free throws made (3rd best in NCAA Division I history)
- NBA 3-point field goal percentage leader (2012)

== Career statistics ==
Legend
GP	Games played	GS	Games started	MPG	Minutes per game
FG%	Field goal percentage	3P%	3-point field goal percentage	FT%	Free throw percentage
RPG	Rebounds per game	APG	Assists per game	SPG	Steals per game
BPG	Blocks per game	PPG	Points per game	**Bold**	Career high

=== NBA ===
*	Led the league

==== Regular season ====
Year	Team	GP	GS	MPG	FG%	3P%	FT%	RPG	APG	SPG	BPG	PPG
2006–07	Houston	35	1	5.5	.360	.333	**1.000**	.7	.2	.1	.0	1.5
2007–08	Houston	35	0	7.5	.480	.479	.750	1.0	.2	.1	.1	3.9
2008–09	L.A. Clippers	71	**3**	16.4	.444	.416	.913	1.8	**.6**	**.3**	.1	6.9
2009–10	L.A. Clippers	54	0	6.7	.389	.310	.778	.6	.1	.1	.0	2.1
2010–11	Dallas	7	0	2.6	.500	**.750**	–	.7	.0	.0	.0	1.6
2010–11	San Antonio	23	0	8.6	**.525**	.548	**1.000**	1.0	.1	.0	**.2**	4.0
2011–12	New York	54	0	18.9	.478	.472*	.846	**1.9**	.2	**.3**	**.2**	**8.8**
2012–13	New York	**81**	1	**20.3**	.414	.425	.909	**1.9**	.4	**.3**	.1	6.6
2013–14	Toronto	54	1	10.0	.411	.426	**1.000**	1.1	.2	.2	.1	3.3
2014–15	Utah	22	0	5.0	.457	.485	.000	.7	.3	.0	.0	2.2
2014–15	Oklahoma City	13	0	6.8	.286	.200	–	.5	.4	.0	.1	1.2
2015–16	Oklahoma City	7	0	3.4	.500	.556	–	.6	.0	.0	.0	2.4
2015–16	Milwaukee	3	0	6.7	.333	.333	**1.000**	.3	.0	.0	.0	2.3
2016–17	Milwaukee	8	0	2.8	.286	.167	–	.4	.0	.0	.0	.6
Career		467	6	12.1	.437	.430	.877	1.3	.3	.2	.1	4.7

==== Playoffs ====
Year	Team	GP	GS	MPG	FG%	3P%	FT%	RPG	APG	SPG	BPG	PPG
2008	Houston	3	0	7.0	**.750**	**.667**	–	.7	.0	.0	**.3**	**2.7**
2011	San Antonio	1	0	6.0	–	–	–	1.0	.0	.0	.0	.0
2012	New York	5	**1**	**19.0**	.444	.571	–	**3.0**	.0	.0	.2	2.4
2013	New York	**9**	0	5.6	.538	.444	–	.4	.0	**.1**	.0	2.0
2014	Toronto	4	0	3.8	.000	.000	–	1.3	**.3**	.0	.0	.0
Career		22	1	8.5	.483	.455	–	1.2	.0	.0	.1	1.7

=== D-League ===
==== Regular season ====
Year	Team	GP	GS	MPG	FG%	3P%	FT%	RPG	APG	SPG	BPG	PPG
2007–08	Rio Grande	**9**	**7**	**39.3**	.468	.450	**.909**	**7.3**	**1.8**	**.3**	**.4**	18.3
2010–11	Reno	2	0	29.0	**.684**	**.643**	.400	6.5	1.0	.0	.0	**18.5**
Career		11	7	37.5	.497	.486	.815	7.2	1.6	.3	.4	18.4

=== College ===
Year	Team	GP	GS	MPG	FG%	3P%	FT%	RPG	APG	SPG	BPG	PPG
2002–03	Marquette	**33**	0	15.5	**.504**	**.505**	.939	2.2	.5	.2	.0	6.7
2003–04	Marquette	31	29	29.5	.407	.430	.912	4.6	**1.3**	**.7**	**.1**	12.5
2004–05	Marquette	31	29	29.9	.457	.461	.905	4.1	.9	.5	**.1**	13.5
2005–06	Marquette	31	**31**	**33.8**	.477	.467	**.974**	**5.9**	**1.3**	.6	**.1**	**17.5**
Career		126	89	27.0	.456	.461	.931	4.2	1.0	.5	.1	12.4

== See also ==
- List of National Basketball Association career 3-point field goal percentage leaders
