= Park and Tilford Building (Lenox Avenue) =

Commercial building in Manhattan, New York

- U.S. National Register of Historic Places
- New York State Register of Historic Places
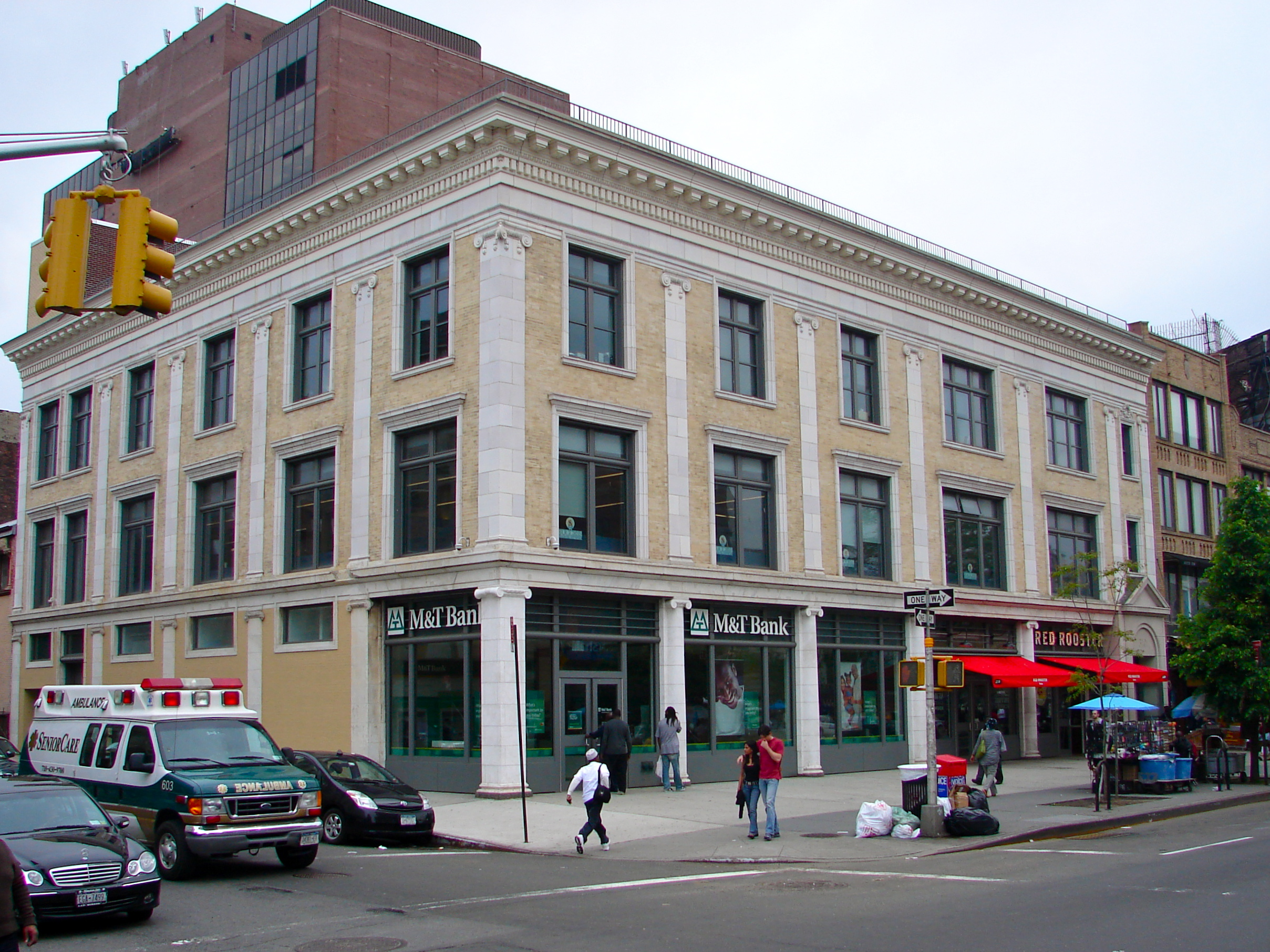
- Location: 310 Lenox Ave., New York, New York
- Coordinates: 40°48′29.3286″N 73°56′41.6754″W
- Area: less than one acre
- Built: 1908
- Architect: Simonson, B. Hustan
- Architectural style: Classical Revival
- NRHP reference No.: 09000258
- NYSRHP No.: 06101.015786

Significant dates
- Added to NRHP: May 1, 2009
- Designated NYSRHP: March 16, 2009

Park and Tilford Building is a historic commercial building located at 310 Lenox Avenue in Harlem, Manhattan, New York City.

== Description and history ==
It was built in 1908 and is a three-story, unreinforced masonry building with a full basement in the Classical Revival style. It features exterior decoration in white marble, limestone, and terra cotta. It originally housed a Park & Tilford grocery store on the first floor, with offices above. As of 2009, the National Basketball Players Association occupied the building's third floor.

It was listed on the National Register of Historic Places on May 1, 2009.
