= Billy Hunter (basketball) =

American football player and basketball executive (born 1942)

No. 23, 24
- Position: Wide receiver

Personal information
- Born: November 5, 1942 (age 84); Camden, New Jersey, U.S.

Career information
- High school: Delaware Township (Delaware Township, New Jersey)
- College: Syracuse

Career history
- Washington Redskins (1965); Miami Dolphins (1966)

Career statistics
- Receptions: 1
- Receiving yards: 29
- Receiving touchdowns: 1
- Kick returns: 23
- Return yards: 516
- Stats at Pro Football Reference

George William Hunter (born November 5, 1942) is an American former executive director of the National Basketball Players Association (NBPA), the players' union of the National Basketball Association (NBA). He is also a former professional football player who was a wide receiver in the National Football League (NFL) for the Washington Redskins and Miami Dolphins.

Hunter played baseball as a child, and helped lead his team to the Little League World Series in 1955. He graduated from Delaware Township High School in Delaware Township (now Cherry Hill), New Jersey, and played college football for the Syracuse Orange. While a student-athlete at Syracuse University, "he helped organize the school's boycott of Southern schools whose stadiums were segregated."

In the NFL, he had one career reception which went for a touchdown. He caught a 29-yard touchdown pass from Dick Shiner in the fourth quarter of a game on October 10, 1965, at District of Columbia Stadium.

Following his football career, Hunter attended law school at UC Berkeley School of Law and became an attorney. One of the youngest United States Attorneys in history, he was appointed to serve the Northern District of California, where he prosecuted high-profile federal defendants including members of Hells Angels and the Black Panther Party. Hunter was named the executive director of the NBPA in 1996. As a lawyer, he rose to prominence in California, eventually being scouted by the Carter administration for the US Attorney's Office of Northern California where he would take cases prosecuting members of Jim Jones's Peoples' Temple following the mass suicide in Guyana, going after members of the Hell's Angels Motorcycle gang, and taking on the difficult Patty Hurst case review where he ultimately convinced Carter to pardon her.

Hunter was criticized for employing many family members within the NBPA. An external audit initiated by Derek Fisher uncovered numerous irregularities, and a select committee of NBA players unanimously ousted Hunter from his position on February 16, 2013, during the NBA All-Star break. In May 2013, Hunter sued the NBPA, Fisher and Jamie Wior—Fisher's publicist and business partner—seeking compensation and punitive damages. The suit claimed that Fisher had a secret deal with NBA owners during the 2011 NBA lockout. In January 2014, a judge dismissed all of Hunter's claims against Wior and Fisher, and Hunter dropped his subsequent appeal in May. However, the judge also ruled that it was the union's prerogative to fire Hunter, but allowed Hunter's claim that he was still owed $10.5 million to continue.
