= Michele A. Roberts =

American attorney

Michele A. Roberts (born 1956) is an American attorney and former executive director of the National Basketball Players Association. She was the first woman to hold that position and the first woman to head a major professional sports union in North America. Previously, she was an attorney with Skadden, Arps, Slate, Meagher & Flom.

== Early life ==
Roberts grew up in a housing project in the South Bronx neighborhood of The Bronx in New York City. She attended the Masters School in Dobbs Ferry, New York. She earned her Bachelor of Arts from Wesleyan University in 1977 and her Juris Doctor from the University of California, Berkeley's School of Law in 1980.

== Career ==
Roberts began her career in 1980 at Public Defender Service for the District of Columbia. She served in that role for eight years, rising to the chief of the trial division. She was mentored by attorney Charles Ogletree.

Roberts built her reputation as a trial lawyer. She worked for Akin Gump from 2004 to 2011. In 2011 she was hired by Skadden, Arps, Slate, Meagher & Flom.

Roberts was named executive director of the National Basketball Players Association in July 2014. She succeeded Billy Hunter in the position. She received 32 of 36 votes.

In 2014 she was named one of ESPNW's Impact 25.

Roberts is an adjunct faculty member at Harvard Law School and a fellow of the American College of Trial Lawyers. The Washingtonian once referred to her as the "finest pure trial lawyer in Washington."

In 2020, Roberts announced plans to resign, but later entered negotiations with NBA players and owners. These negotiations included the planning for the 2020 NBA Bubble, where play resumed during the COVID-19 pandemic. The negotiations also included efforts to promote racial justice, such as painting Black Lives Matter on NBA courts.

In 2021, Sports Illustrated included Roberts' in "The Unrelenting", a feature on women in sports. Worth named her one of the "21 Most Powerful Women in the Business of Sports". That same year, Crain's New York included her on its list of "Notable Women in Law".

Roberts retired as the NBPA executive director in January 2022.

Since 2025, Roberts has served as a lecturer in the HELEGS Executive Program on the Law, Economics, and Geopolitics of Professional Sports, specializing in the legal and sociopolitical aspects of the North American Sports Model..
