= Tim Chen =

Tim Chen may refer to:

- Tim Chen (corporate executive), Chinese corporate executive
- Tim Chen (entrepreneur), co-founder and CEO of NerdWallet
