= NBA Store =

Chain of NBA-associated retailers selling merchandise

The NBA Store

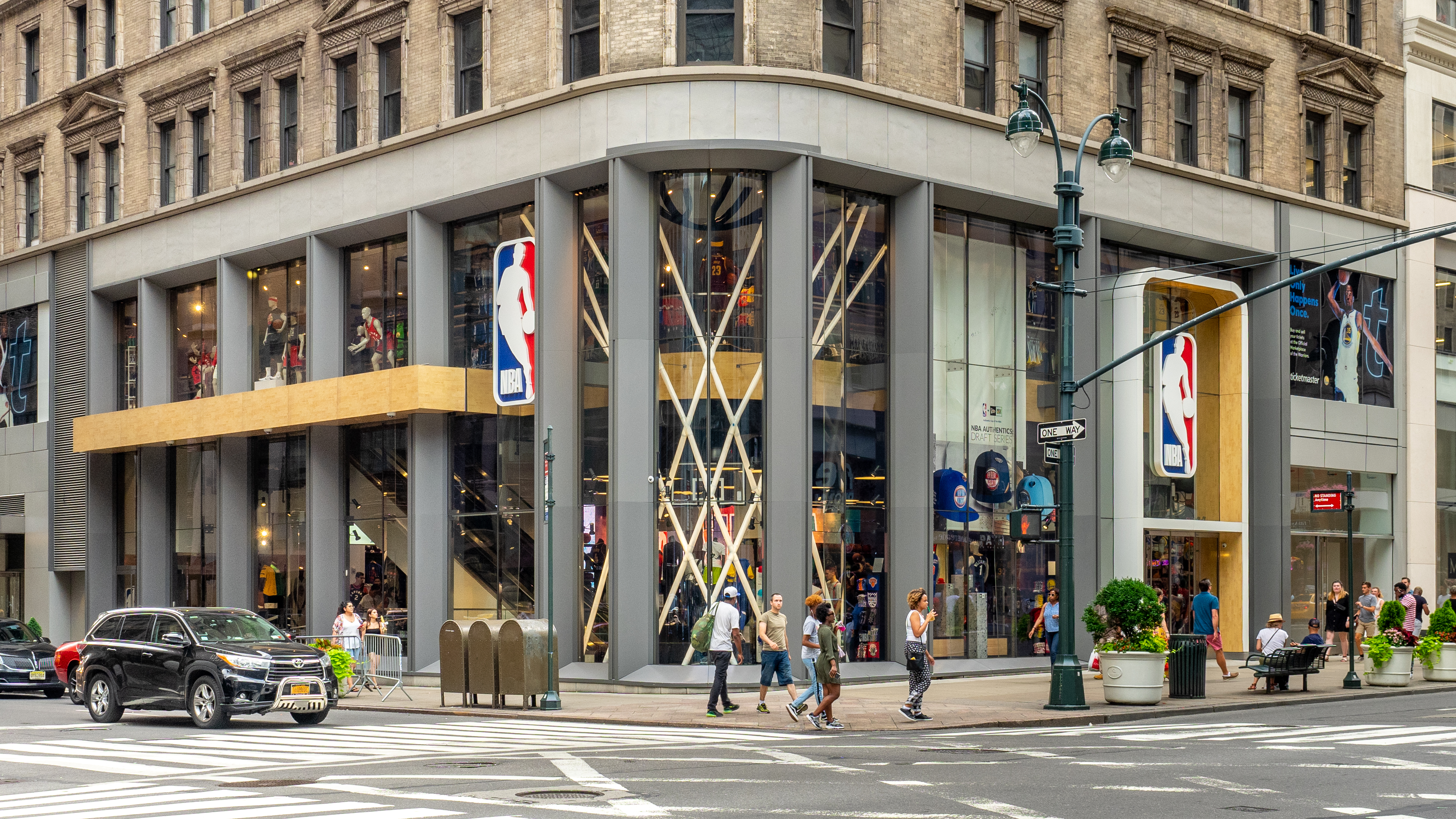
- The NBA store at 545 Fifth Avenue
- Founded: 1998
- Owner: National Basketball Association
- Website: nbanyc.fanatics.com

The NBA Store is a chain of officially licensed retailers which sell merchandise for the National Basketball Association (NBA). The most prominent of these stores is located in the United States on Fifth Avenue and 45th Street, Manhattan, New York City. There are seven other locations outside the United States: one in Sydney, Australia and Melbourne, Australia, Milan, Italy, two in Beijing, China, one in Taipei, Taiwan, London, England, one in Buenos Aires and three in South Africa and the Metro Manila.

The New York location is run by online retailer Fanatics. The NBA Store sells over 35,000 pieces of NBA merchandise and features several attractions. It is often visited by players, celebrities, and political leaders. It also serves as a headquarters for the NBA where the association hosts charity events.

Since opening its first store in 1998, the NBA has seen increasing business opportunities in foreign markets mainly due to the influx of new international players. The biggest growth has been in China, where players Yao Ming and Yi Jianlian, combined with the interest generated by the 2008 Summer Olympics, created enough demand to open two new stores. The NBA has also expanded into games like Second Life where it created a virtual NBA Store in 2007.

The original Fifth Avenue store closed on February 13, 2011. The league temporarily relocated the store in a smaller space at 590 Fifth Avenue until August 2015. The new location, at 545 Fifth Avenue, opened on December 21, 2015.

== New York City ==
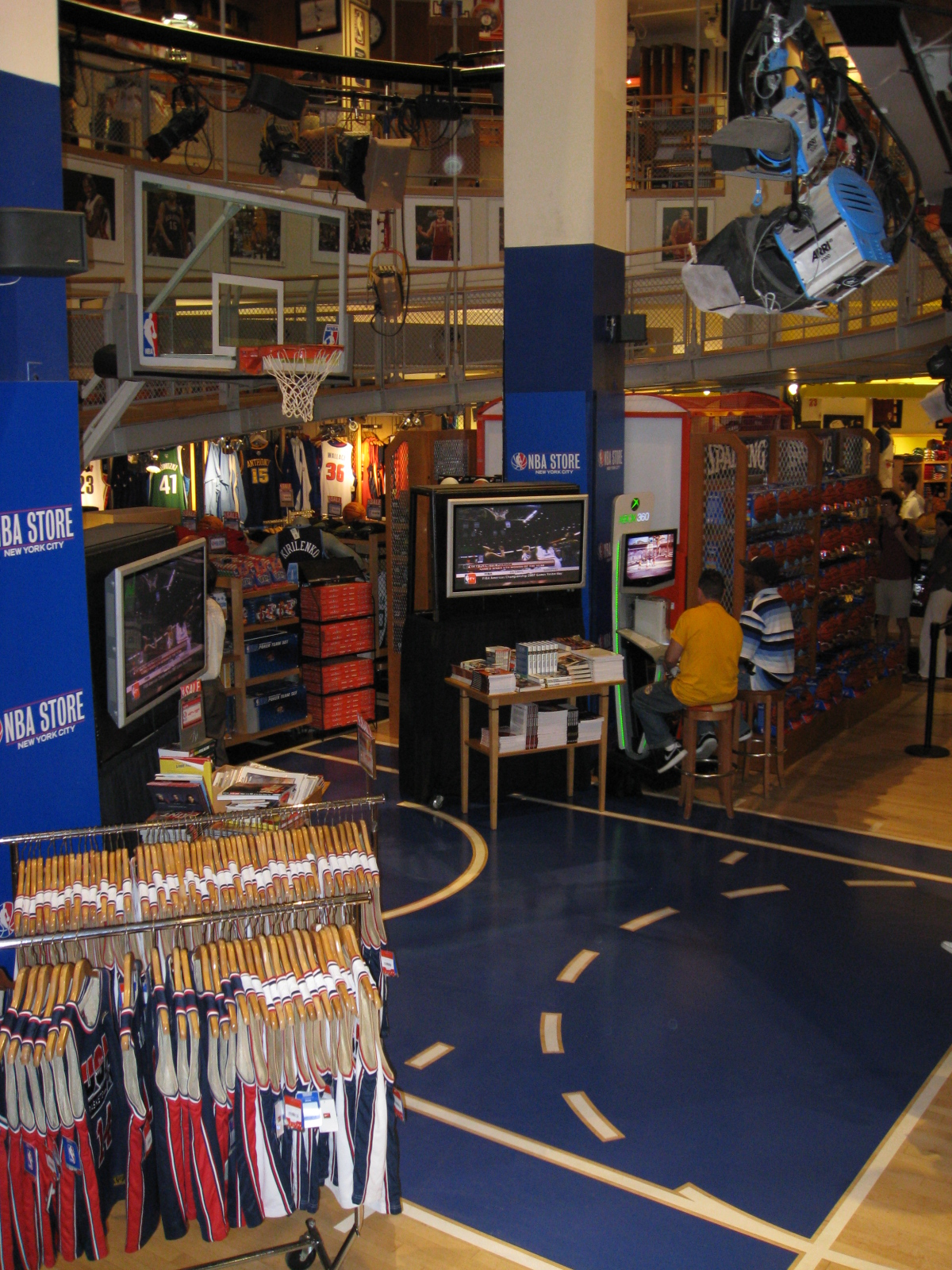
Inside the original New York store, opened in 1998

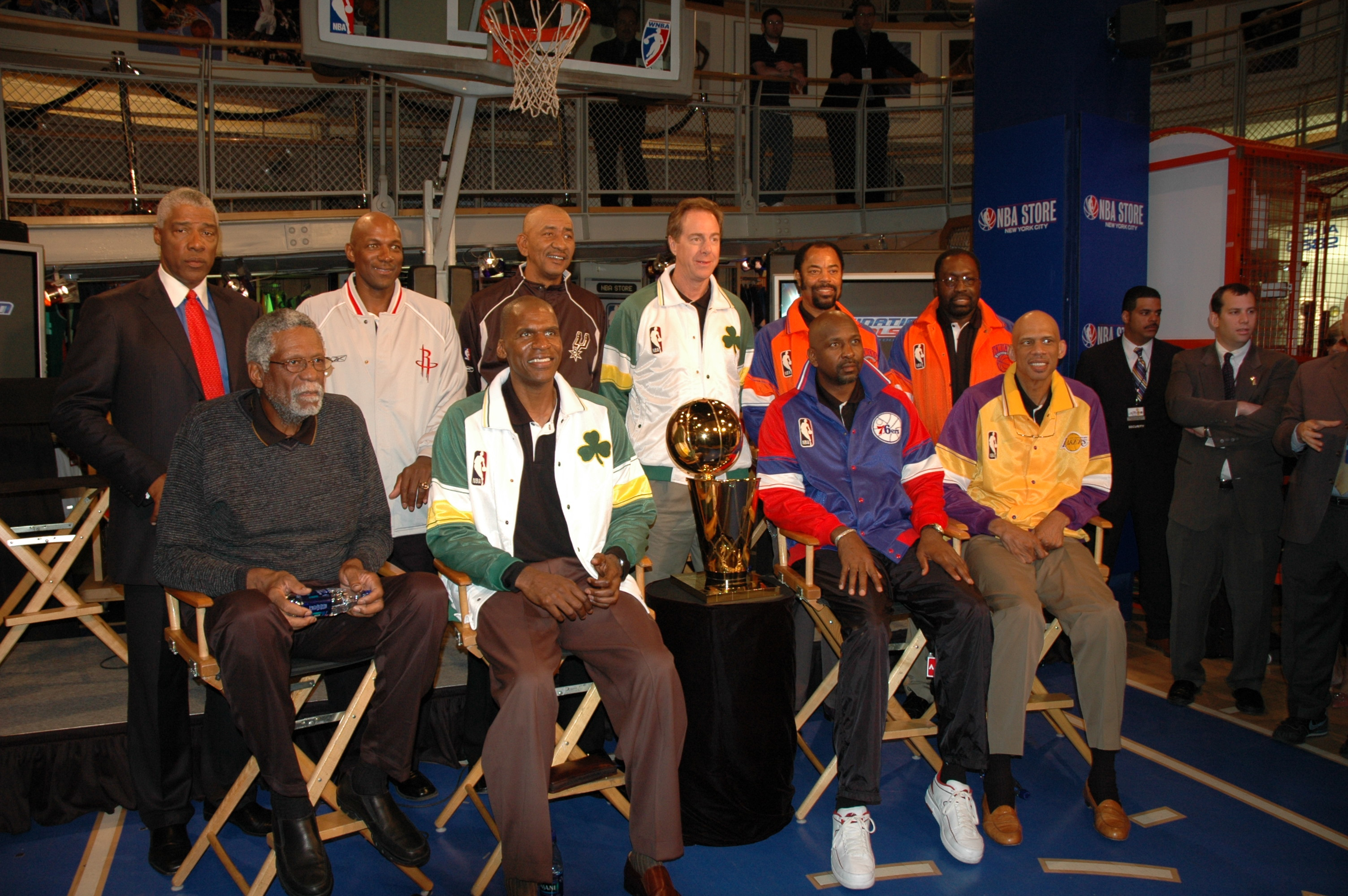
Former NBA players at the New York store in 2005

Established in the fall of 1998 at 666 Fifth Avenue, the 25,000-square-foot (2,300 m^{2}) store offers free video games, TV screens displaying live broadcasts and game action footage, and other attractions, like player measurement charts. Among its many products, the store sells current NBA & WNBA jerseys, replica jerseys of retired players, footwear, collectibles, photography, and other gifts. It has several departments, such as a home section, where customers can buy items like pillows, plates, and other NBA related items. NBA employees, including players, receive a 30% discount on their purchases.

It's really meant to be in the world's most important city and the most complete collection of N.B.A. products and experiences staged in one place.

— Rick Welts, chief marketing officer of the N.B.A.

Construction involved removing beams to make space for a 36-by-54-foot hole at the base of 666 Fifth Avenue.

Steve Candeloro has been the store's concierge since it opened in 1998. The store is frequently visited by celebrities, tourists, and NBA players who are in town to play the New York Knicks or Brooklyn Nets. The NBA Store has been visited by important guests such as former President Bill Clinton, and the Mayor of London, Ken Livingstone, who received a personal tour by NBA Commissioner David Stern. The store is also host to The NBA Store Concert Series, concert events where musical artists perform at the store's half court; some previous performers include: Michelle Branch, Destiny's Child, Run DMC, and Aaron Carter.

The NBA Store in New York City allowed its customers to rent areas for birthday parties or other private celebrations and has hosted charity events in the past. During Christmas 2006, the wife of NBA player Dwyane Wade volunteered at the NBA Store Holiday Toy Drive. The New York Knicks regularly held events like Autographs for Supplies at the NBA Store where New York players like Eddy Curry, Zach Randolph, and WNBA's Kym Hampton meet fans and signs items in an effort to raise school supplies for children and stress academics. In 2007, the store held a fashion exhibition to celebrate the Casual Male Retail Group acquisition of the men's big & tall clothing company Jared M., a company popular among athletes and celebrities for its custom sportswear; several NBA players were happy to show their support since the founder had fitted many of them in the past.

Jersey sales in U.S.^{†}
#	2005–06	2006–07	2007–08
1.	Dwyane Wade	Kobe Bryant	Kevin Garnett
2.	LeBron James	Dwyane Wade	Kobe Bryant
3.	Allen Iverson	LeBron James	Allen Iverson
4.	Kobe Bryant	Allen Iverson	LeBron James
5.	Stephon Marbury	Carmelo Anthony	Steve Nash
6.	Shaquille O'Neal	Steve Nash	Dwyane Wade
7.	Tracy McGrady	Vince Carter	Gilbert Arenas
8.	Carmelo Anthony	Gilbert Arenas	Dirk Nowitzki
9.	Vince Carter	Shaquille O'Neal	Stephon Marbury
10.	Ben Wallace	Stephon Marbury	Carmelo Anthony
11.	Tim Duncan	Dirk Nowitzki	Kevin Durant
12.	Dirk Nowitzki	Tracy McGrady	Paul Pierce
13.	Paul Pierce	Paul Pierce	Tracy McGrady
14.	Steve Nash	Chris Paul	Dwight Howard
15.	Amar'e Stoudemire	Tim Duncan	Chris Paul
^{†} Combined sales at the NBA Store in New York City and NBAStore.com

In 2007, the most sold team paraphernalia were from the Los Angeles Lakers, New York Knicks, and the 2006 NBA champions the Miami Heat. The following year, the Lakers and Knicks retained their top spots, but the Heat were replaced by the new 2008 NBA champions the Boston Celtics.

The NBA Store's main outlet in New York City was closed on February 13, 2011, due to high rent. "The amount of dollars the landlord is requiring from the next tenant, we couldn't find a way to make it work," NBA executive vice president of global merchandising Sal LaRocca said. While the league searched for a new location the store operated temporarily at 590 Fifth Avenue until August 2015. The store reopened at its new permanent location at 545 Fifth Avenue on December 21, 2015.

== Beijing, China ==
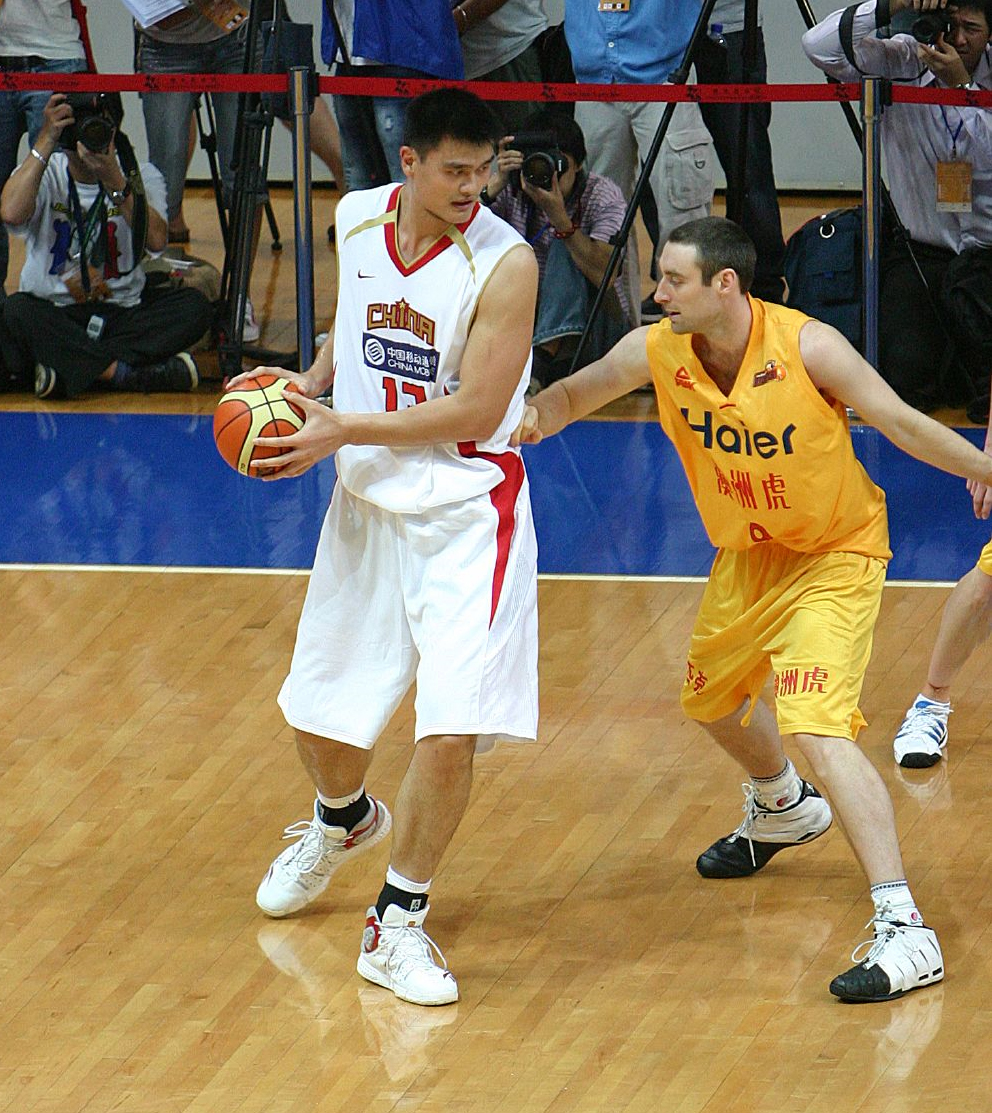
International players like Chinese Yao Ming (in white) have increased interest abroad and opened opportunities in China.

The NBA also sells its products outside the United States, most notably in China. The NBA's international operations only provide 10 percent of total profit; however, the NBA has seen a recent increase in possible business opportunities abroad.

Statistics revealed that 300 million out of China's 1.3 billion population played basketball, additionally "83 percent of males between 15 to 61 years old are interested in the game," and the NBA was reported to be "the most popular sports league in the country." In 2006, it was reported that the NBA was planning to open its first store in Beijing, China (on Wangfujing Street) or Shanghai, China. Partly due to Yao Ming (1st overall pick in 2002) and Yi Jianlian's (6th overall pick in 2007) popularity in their home country, the NBA now sells its products in some 30,000 to 50,000 retail locations in China. During the 2006 season the NBA broadcast its games in 215 countries and had 83 foreign players, about a quarter of the total players. In 2008, it had 75 players from 32 countries.

On January 14, 2008, the NBA announced the formation of NBA China ("a joint venture of the NBA, broadcaster ESPN and Chinese companies"), "that will conduct all of the league's businesses in Greater China", the new entity will be led by Tim Chen (former CEO of Microsoft Greater China). In preparation for the 2008 Summer Olympics in China, the NBA opened a flagship store in Beijing; the JuneYao Group was chosen to lead marketing operations for the retail chain-store.

The NBA currently has two stores in China (both in Beijing) and according to CEO Chen plans to expand "up to 1,000 in the next five years." The first store was opened on July 15, 2008; it has "300 square meters of retail space" and sells about 400 different items; about 1,000 people showed up for the opening. According to the International Herald Tribune, merchandise sales in China were expected to increase by 60 percent in 2008. About one third of the traffic received at nba.com comes from their Chinese area (china.nba.com) written in Mandarin built by the Plus Factory, a New York City firm with offices in Beijing.

Reports on NBA jersey sales over the last three years (2006–2009) reveal that Kobe Bryant of the Los Angeles Lakers is the most sold jersey in China; however, Yao Ming fell from 6th to 10th and then back to 6th while his Houston Rockets teammate Tracy McGrady remained ranked third for two straight seasons then fell to fourth in 2009.

Jersey sales in China (2006–2009)
Season	1.	2.	3.	4.	5.	6.	7.	8.	9.	10.
2008–09	Kobe Bryant	LeBron James	Kevin Garnett	Tracy McGrady	Dwyane Wade	Yao Ming	Chris Paul	Allen Iverson	Dwight Howard	Carmelo Anthony
2007–08	Kobe Bryant	Kevin Garnett	Tracy McGrady	Paul Pierce	Allen Iverson	Gilbert Arenas	LeBron James	Dwyane Wade	Dwight Howard	Yao Ming
2006–07	Kobe Bryant	Allen Iverson	Tracy McGrady	Dwyane Wade	LeBron James	Yao Ming	Kevin Garnett	Tim Duncan	Carmelo Anthony	Gilbert Arenas

== Second Life ==
The virtual NBA Store as portrayed in the game Second Life.

The MMORPG Second Life, an Internet-based virtual game world, offers its members the option of playing or shopping at a digital replica of the NBA Store. The 3-D virtual replica was launched on May 1, 2007, during the NBA Finals between the San Antonio Spurs and the Cleveland Cavaliers as a way of reaching the global audience and expanding the NBA's business in the virtual world. The virtual NBA Store is part of the NBA's virtual headquarters; other facilities include a T-Mobile arena where player's avatars can take pictures or watch Finals footage on a JumboTron. At the time of its launch, the NBA was the "first professional sports league to unveil a comprehensive headquarters in a virtual world." The virtual store's entrance is modeled after the New York City location, featuring the same double revolving doors and gold NBA lettering.

In 2004, the NBA Live series for home video game consoles introduced an EA NBA Store feature, where players can purchase digital shoes and jerseys with points earned through the completion of in-game tasks.
