= Basketball in China =

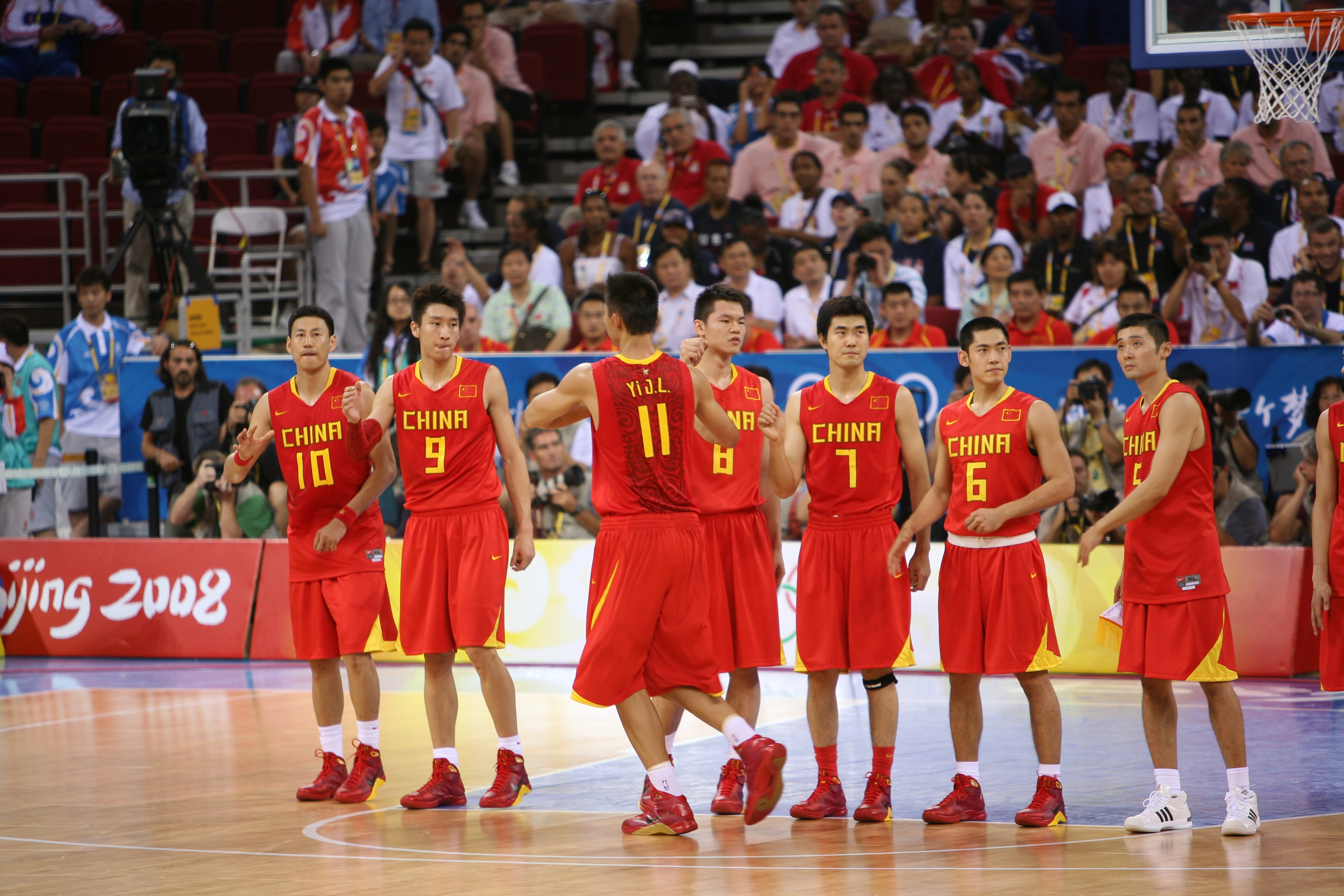
- Team China in Beijing Olympic Games
- Country: China
- Governing body: CBA
- National team: China

National competitions
- Chinese Basketball Association; National Basketball League

International competitions
- Olympics; FIBA Asian Cup; FIBA Basketball World Cup

Basketball and association football are the largest spectator sports in China. In 2018, 21% of Chinese people said that basketball is their favourite sport. In association football, the figure was 17%. In recent years, the popularity of association football grew harder than the popularity of basketball. In 2022, 22% of Chinese people called basketball their favourite sport, followed by 21% for association football.

The National Basketball Association (NBA) is the most popular sports league in China, edging the Premier League, UEFA Champions League, FIFA World Cup, La Liga, Serie A, and UEFA European Football Championship as the most popular sports event. The popularity of basketball in China has been supported by the Chinese Basketball Association which hosts professional play in China. In international competition, the Chinese men's national team has won 16 titles of the FIBA Asia Cup between 1975 and 2005 and is the dominant force in Asian basketball. Six Chinese nationals have played in the NBA. The most famous Chinese basketball player is Yao Ming, an elected member of the Naismith Memorial Basketball Hall of Fame, and the incumbent president of the Chinese Basketball Association.

== History ==
The Young Men's Christian Association (YMCA) brought basketball to China when they established the first YMCA in Tianjin in 1895, four years after the first game of basketball was played at Spring Field College (a YMCA Training School at the time) in Massachusetts, United States of America. The sport spread quickly due to it not requiring many resources to play. The growth of basketball throughout China spread fast enough that it was an event in the 1910 and 1914 National Games, only 15 years after the first YMCA in China. This can also be due to the YMCA's heavy involvement in the preparation of the events due to the failings of the Late Qing Dynasty. During this time, China started competing internationally in basketball. This started with the First Far Eastern Championship Games in 1913. This event, where they competed in basketball, was held in Manila, Philippine between three nations: China, Japan, and the Philippines. By 1935, basketball was voted upon by the citizens of China to be one of the two national sports alongside ping pong.

After the formation of the People's Republic of China (PRC) in 1949, China looked to sports, including basketball, as a way to create diplomatic relations. It started within the Socialist Bloc where China sent teams to compete against other socialist nations such as Hungary, Czechoslovakia, and Romania. It eventually spread to other countries such as Switzerland and France in 1959. Teams were eventually travelling around the world including the United States post ping pong diplomacy in the 1970s. China captured their first Olympic medal in 1984 in Los Angeles when the women's team brought home a bronze medal defeating Canada. The sport has reached its maximum popularity with the emergence of the National Basketball Association’s (NBA) popularity in large part due to Yao Ming becoming a hall of fame player in the United States. China hosted the 2019 FIBA Basketball World Cup.

== History of the NBA in China ==
On August 24, 1979, the team formerly known as the Washington Bullets, now known as the Washington Wizards, was the first NBA team to be invited to China. There were two exhibition games, which the Bullets participated in, and the opposing teams were the Chinese national team and the Bayi Rockets. NBA relations and popularity continued to rise as Chinese state media televised NBA games in the ’80s. NBA games being televised in China was due to the efforts of David Stern, as he signed a deal with the states and gave broadcasting rights to China Central Television (CCTV) for free. Regardless of the fact that basketball had been played in China for a long time, this was the country's first official exposure to the NBA. This occurred during the peak of NBA players such as Michael Jordan and Magic Johnson. This led to an amassment of over 450 million fans in China.

In 2002, Yao Ming, a 7-foot-6-inch (2.29 m) center from Shanghai, China, was drafted by the Houston Rockets. Yao Ming became the first international player selected as a first overall pick in the draft. The NBA experienced a major frenzy in China as a result of Yao's accomplishment in the league, as his popularity spread throughout the country. After Chinese television stations expanded their NBA coverage, thanks to Yao, the league also saw a massive spike in television ratings. The NBA became the first American professional sports league to compete in China as two Rockets preseason games were played there in 2004, two years after Yao entered the league.

In 2007, Yi Jianlian, joined the NBA after his years in the CBA and played on the Milwaukee Bucks. When Yao Ming and Yi Jianlian played in 2007, the NBA game was televised on 13 Chinese Outlets and total viewership amassed to 200 million viewers.

In 2019, NBA games were not being televised due to recent problems between the NBA and China. Companies such as Vivo, state broadcaster CCTV, and Tencent suspended all operations with the National Basketball Association.

In 2021, the NBA and China relationship is being mended as NBA games are being broadcast on CCTV networks again.

In 2025, the NBA staged a return to hosting games in China as the Brooklyn Nets—owned by billionaire co-founder of Alibaba, Joe Tsai—and the Phoenix Suns played two games in Macau. Games in China are broadcast by Tencent who has distribution rights with the NBA through 2027.

== NBA China Organization ==
In January 2008, the NBA established NBA China in collaboration with local operations and management. NBA China, which was established in 2008 and managed the league's business operations in the region, is estimated to be worth more than $4 billion. NBA China is headquartered in Beijing and hired over 115 employees through four offices in Beijing, Shanghai, Hong Kong, and Taipei.

All of the league's business in Greater China is managed by the NBA China organization, including television and other media merchandising and marketing.

In 2008, ESPN, a Walt Disney Company division, Bank of China Group Investment, Legend Holdings Limited, the holding company for PC manufacturer Lenovo, the Li Ka Shing Foundation, and China Merchants Investments, an affiliate of China Merchants Bank, invested a total of $253 million in order to acquire 11 percent of the preference shares in NBA China.

In 2008 the organization NBA China was established under Tim Chen, the former CEO of Microsoft Greater China. Tim Chen joined the NBA in mid-October in 2008 and was appointed as the CEO of the NBA China Organization. In his original four years with Microsoft, Chen forged a productive relationship with Chinese regulators, and he managed to convince governments to buy the licensed software.

In 2020 the CEO of the NBA China Organization was Derek Chang, but he decided to step down and the new CEO for the 2020-21 year is Michael Ma. Michael Ma has an MBA from Columbia Business School and a bachelor's degree in mathematics from Rutgers. In May 2020, Michael Ma took over the position of Derek Chang, and Ma was a crucial figure in helping launch NBA China in 2008. He helped grow the league's presence throughout the country through corporate development, sponsorships, media distribution, and gaming.

== Popularity of basketball in China ==
Basketball was introduced in the late 1890s to China, and the sport gained support quickly. In 1935, basketball was introduced as a national pastime, and in 1936 the Chinese formed a basketball Olympic team due to the popularity of the sport.

In the 1950s, the People's Liberation Army (PLA), a branch in China's Army, which consisted of an army of over two million-plus active-duty members, was encouraged to play basketball. Over 80 years, the People's Liberation Army practiced and played basketball to build teamwork and create unison. They also promoted positive messages such as “Boost National Image” or “Friendship First, Competition Second.” The army used to play in teams, and one of the prominent teams was the Bayi Rockets, which were people from the military. The Bayi Rockets were a force in Chinese basketball and produced one of China's first NBA players, Wang Zhizhi.

In 2020, about 625 million people in China were fans of basketball, and 143 million people in China were considered hardcore fans, essentially meaning these fans regularly watch and play basketball. 482 million remaining fans were general fans. The number of viewers accumulates to be more than the population of the United States. In order to establish high viewership, the NBA made efforts to grow the Chinese fan base through summer tours and marketing practices to appeal to the primary audience of China.

The NBA China has an account on Douyin, the app known as TikTok in China, which has accumulated over 12.3 million followers and collected over 410 million likes. This account published content regularly and was able to amass the following, making the National Basketball Association (NBA) the most followed sports league in the country of China.

The NBA also deals with WeChat, a Chinese social app, where fans follow their favorite players, favorite teams, and live games. The NBA has approximately 1.4 million followers on Tencent's WeChat app.

On the Weibo platform, an app similar to Twitter in China, the NBA accumulated over 44 million followers on the forum. Weibo features exclusive content, such as player interviews. These partnerships increased basketball's popularity by making the organization more accessible to Chinese citizens.

== Basketball's scholarly influence in China ==
In November 2011, NBA China and Dongguan New Century launched the CBA Dongguan Basketball School for players ages 12–17. In February 2014, Yao Ming collaborated with the NBA China organization in opening the first afterschool basketball program in Beijing. Collaboratively both were able to provide fitness and basketball training for kids of all ages. By October 2014, The National Basketball Association and China's Ministry of Education revealed a multi-year collaboration October 2014 to integrate an exercise and basketball development curriculum into the schools around the country. By October 2016, the NBA announced that it would open academies in Ürümqi, Jinan, and Hangzhou, after playing 12 preseason games in four cities. The NBA opened the academies to support the community of China and the influence the NBA has on China.

== Controversy and consequences ==
On October 4, 2019, Daryl Morey, the general manager of the Houston Rockets, posted and deleted a tweet regarding Hong Kong. The tweet in question was an image that supported protesters in Hong Kong and the withdrawal of the 2019 Hong Kong extradition bill. On October 5, 2019, the owner of the Rockets, Tilman Fertitta, addressed the controversy by stating that Morey's tweet reflected his own (Morey's) personal opinion, and not that of the NBA or the Houston Rockets. Morey later apologized for the tweet and echoed Fertitta's disclaimer. On October 6, 2019, the Chinese Basketball Association (CBA) halted cooperation with the Rockets in response to Morey's tweet.

On October 6, 2019, the NBA made a public statement apologizing on behalf of Daryl Morey but reminded the public that the NBA does not regulate what players, coaches, and staff say due to freedom of speech. On October 7, 2019, American politicians including Ted Cruz, Andrew Yang, and Julian Castro supported Daryl Morey and his tweet and shamed the NBA for apologizing.

China has a history of retaliating harshly against companies that refer to its domestic affairs or seem to pose a threat to its authority, as evidently, Chinese leagues, streaming services, sponsors, and partners cut relations with the NBA. The backlash of the tweet was costly for the NBA. Adam Silver, the commissioner of the NBA, reported losses could reach up to $400 million. Adam Silver stated that The China Central Television (CCTV) and other television platforms halted the broadcasting of Houston games.

== Violence from basketball in China ==
In 2001 Asian Basketball Championship, a fight broke out between China and Lebanon after the game had ended. The fans of the China team threw objects at the Lebanese players, leaving several bloodied before police broke up the fight.

A fight that involved Chinese fans and players from China and Puerto Rico took place at a game in Beijing in August 2005. Two Chinese players ran to the opposing team's bench at the end of the game to fight Puerto Rican players. The Puerto Rican players laid a hard foul on a Chinese player. Even though China was leading by a large margin through the game, the attack commenced due to a player getting hurt. The two players who charged were Li Nan and Mo Ke, and the player being fouled was Yi Jianlian. The Puerto Rico center who fouled Yi was Manuel Narvaez. Reports indicated that 3,000 spectators threw objects at the visitor team from Puerto Rico. Visitors attempted to flee to the locker room and the media referred to the night as a “night of shame.”

A fight involving Chinese players and Brazilian players took place in October 2010. Both sides were holding a friendly warm-up game for the Asians Game. The game took place in Xuchang, Henan Province, but 66 seconds into the game, a fight commenced. Players from both sides engaged in combat and exchanged kicks and punches, ending the game immediately. After the first fight ended, players headed back to their locker rooms, but Brazilian players were assaulted once again by the Chinese, and violence erupted once more. After both fights ended and players on the Brazilian team were left injured. The Chinese Basketball Association (CBA) apologized to the Brazilian players and the organizations, and the CBA put Chinese players’ training on hold before the Asian Games. The CBA organization required Chinese players to attend sportsmanship classes, and the aftermath led to some players and coaches being suspended.

August 18, 2011, a fight involving Bayi Rockets, a Chinese professional team, and Georgetown Hoyas players took place. The game between the two teams was an exhibition game. In the fight, the Hoyas team was attacked as they were making their way back to their locker rooms. A Georgetown fan was hit with a bottle and fell to the ground. The fight ended, and on the following Sunday, captains of both teams met and had a friendly meeting and settled differences with autographed basketballs.

== Foreign players in China ==
The CBA allowed foreign players, such as players from the NBA, to play in the Chinese Basketball Association. The list of foreign players includes All-Stars such as Metta World Peace, Stephon Marbury, Gilbert Arenas, Tracy McGrady, and Steve Francis. The CBA also had several NBA veterans who played in the CBA, such as Jeremy Lin, Aaron Brooks, Jimmer Fredette, Randolph Morris, Al Harrington, Lester Hudson, Michael Beasley, Kenyon Martin, Shavlik Randolph& J.R. Smith. Similarly, the WCBA allowed foreign players, such as players from the WNBA, to play in the Women's Chinese Basketball Association. The list of foreign players includes All-Stars such as Crystal Langhorne, Stefanie Dolson, Candace Parker, and more who currently play or played in the Women's National Basketball Association.

== Men's and Women's Chinese Basketball Association ==
The Chinese Basketball Association or CBA was established in 1995, which was a Chinese version of the NBA. There are 20 teams in the CBA league that are split into two divisions. There is the Northern Division and the Southern Division.

The Women's Chinese Basketball Association (WCBA) was established in 2002 under the CBA. There are 17 teams in the WCBA league with no split in divisions.

== National League ==
Chinese Basketball Association is the national professional basketball league in China.

== National team ==
The China men's national basketball team has won FIBA Asia Cup 15 times.

== Notable people ==
- Wang Zhizi — a retired player professional basketball player who is currently the head coach of the Bayi Rockets. He was China's first player to compete in the NBA.
- Mengke Bateer — a retired player who played parts of three seasons in the NBA and majority of his career competing in the Chinese Basketball Association.
- Yao Ming — basketball executive and retired professional basketball player who played in the Chinese Basketball Association (CBA) and National Basketball Association (NBA). He is the only player from outside of the United States to lead the NBA in All-Star votes.

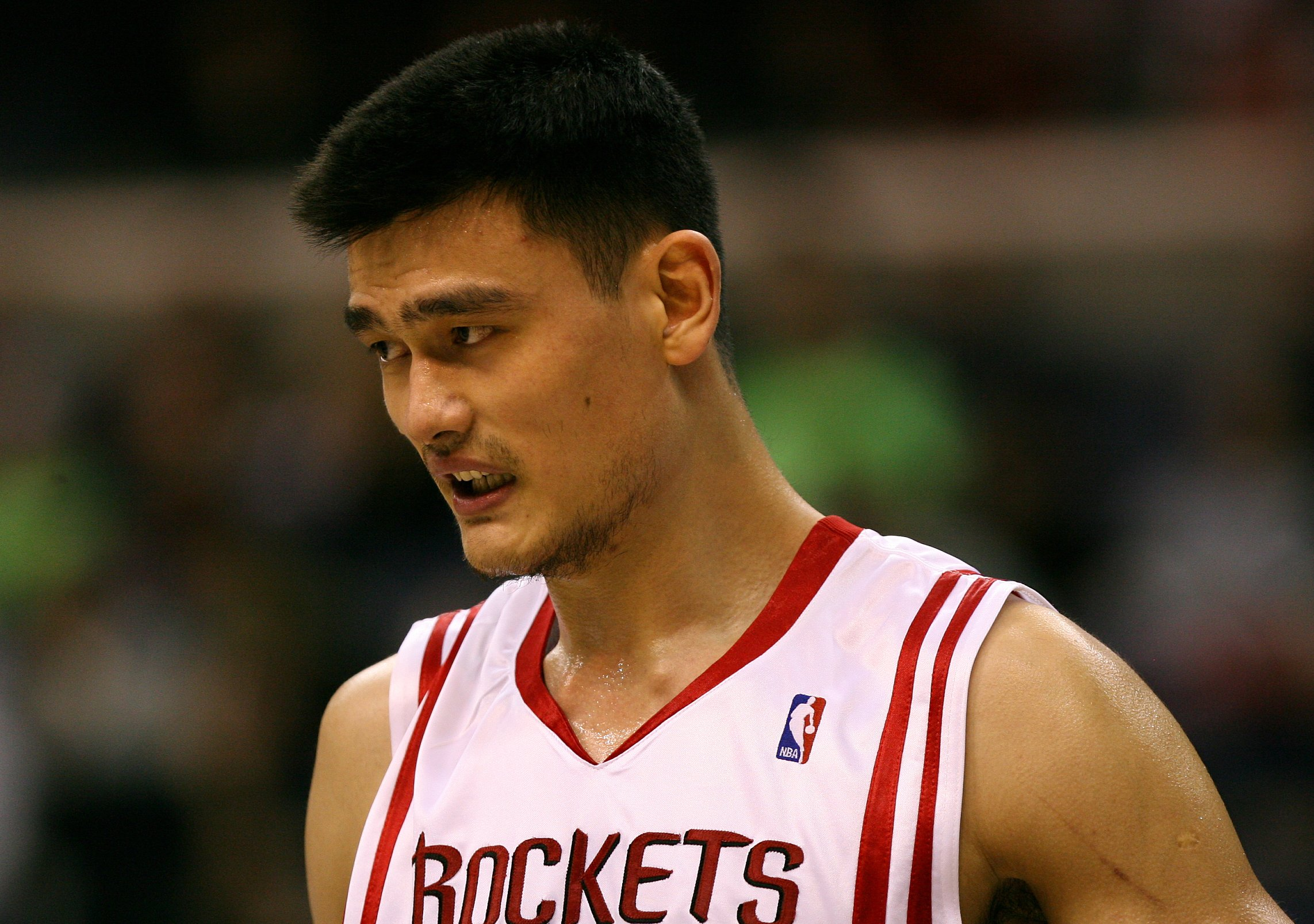
Yao Ming, widely considered to be the greatest Chinese basketball player in history.

== Arenas ==
- Wukesong Arena also known as the Cadillac Center in Beijing. It was originally built for the 2008 Summer Olympics basketball preliminaries and finals.
- The Mercedes-Benz Arena formerly known as the Shanghai World Expo Cultural Center, is an indoor arena located on the former grounds of Expo 2010 in Pudong, Shanghai.

== Attendances ==
The average attendance per top-flight league season and the basketball club with the highest average attendance:

Season	League average	Best club	Best club average
2015-16	4,710	Flying Leopard	7,124
