= National Basketball Association =

North American professional basketball league

- Current season, competition or edition: 2026–27 NBA season
- Sport: Basketball
- Founded: June 6, 1946; 80 years ago (as BAA), New York City, New York, U.S. August 3, 1949; 77 years ago (as NBA)
- First season: 1946–47
- Commissioner: Adam Silver
- No. of teams: 30
- Countries: United States (29 teams); Canada (1 team)
- Headquarters: 645 Fifth Avenue; New York City, New York, U.S. 100 Plaza Drive; Secaucus, New Jersey, U.S.
- Continent: North America
- Most recent champions: New York Knicks (3rd title)
- Most titles: Boston Celtics (18 titles)
- Broadcasters: United States: ABC/ESPN/Disney+; NBC/Peacock; Amazon Prime Video; NBA TV; ESPN Radio; Canada: TSN/TSN2; Sportsnet/Sportsnet One; NBA TV Canada; International: See list
- Website: www.nba.com

The National Basketball Association (NBA) is a professional basketball league in North America composed of 30 teams (29 in the United States and 1 in Canada). The NBA is one of the major professional sports leagues in the United States and Canada and is considered the premier basketball league in the world. The league is headquartered in New York City and Secaucus, New Jersey.

The NBA was created on August 3, 1949, with the merger of the Basketball Association of America (BAA) and the National Basketball League (NBL). The league later adopted the BAA's history and considers its founding on June 6, 1946, as its own. In 1976, the NBA and the American Basketball Association (ABA) merged, adding four franchises to the NBA. The NBA's regular season runs from October to April, with each team playing 82 games. The league's playoff tournament extends into June, culminating with the NBA Finals championship series.

The NBA is a member of USA Basketball (USAB), which is recognized by the International Basketball Federation (FIBA) as the governing body for basketball in the United States. The NBA is the second-wealthiest professional sports league in the world by revenue after the National Football League (NFL). As of 2020, NBA players are the world's highest paid athletes by average annual salary per player. In 1996, the NBA created a women's league, the Women's National Basketball Association (WNBA). The NBA also operates the NBA G League, NBA 2K League, and the Basketball Africa League.

The Boston Celtics have the most NBA championships with 18, winning most recently in 2024. The New York Knicks are the reigning league champions, having defeated the San Antonio Spurs in the 2026 NBA Finals.

== History ==
=== Creation and BAA–NBL merger (1946–1956) ===
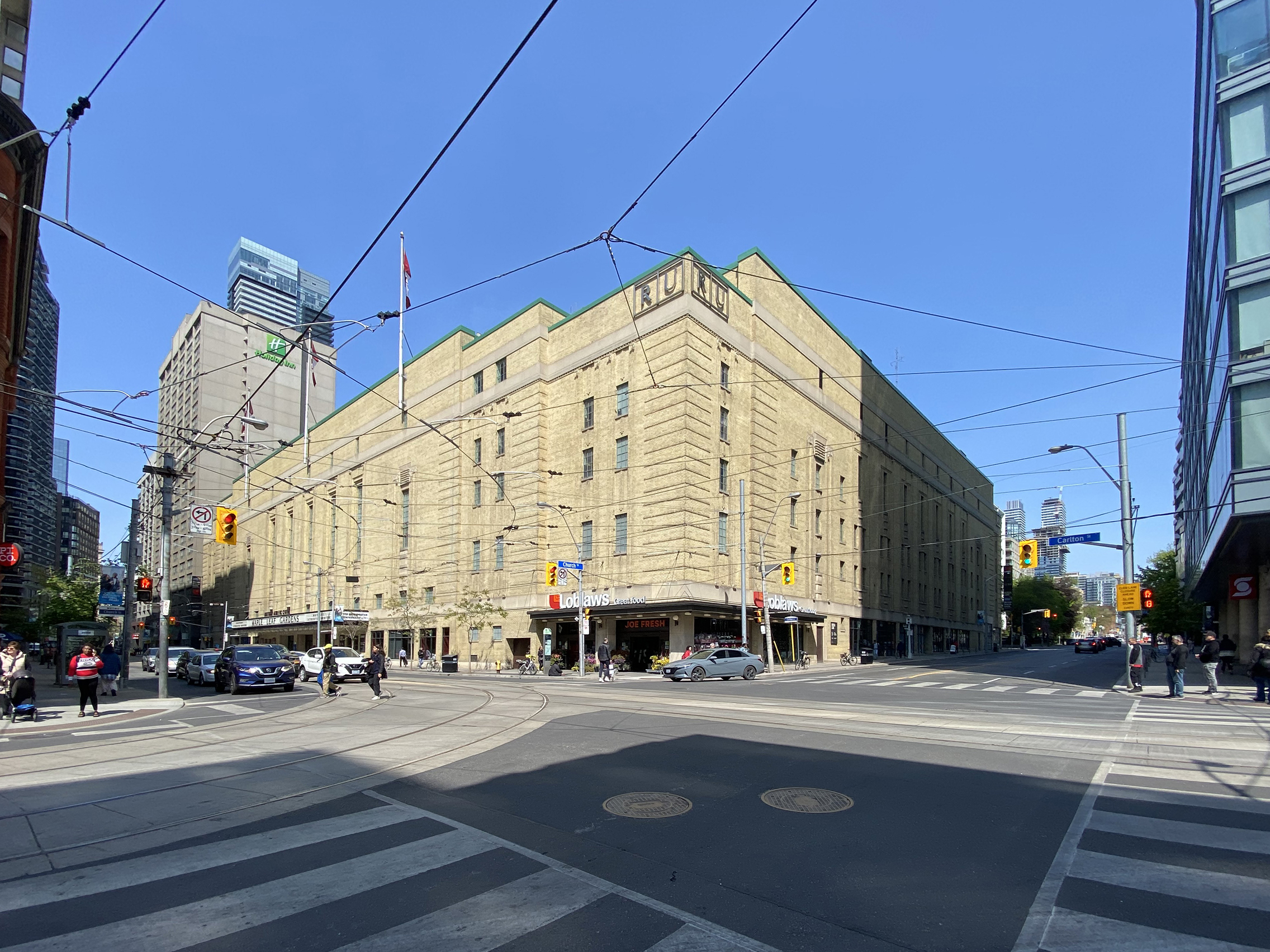
Maple Leaf Gardens in Toronto, site of the first-ever NBA game on November 1, 1946

The NBA began as the Basketball Association of America (BAA), which was founded in 1946 by owners of the major ice hockey arenas in the Northeastern and Midwestern United States and Canada. On November 1, 1946, in Toronto, Ontario, Canada, the Toronto Huskies hosted the New York Knickerbockers at Maple Leaf Gardens, in a game the league now calls the first game played in NBA history. The first basket was made by Ossie Schectman of the Knickerbockers.

Although there had been earlier attempts at professional basketball leagues, including the American Basketball League (ABL) and the National Basketball League (NBL), the BAA was the first league to attempt to play primarily in large arenas in major cities. During its early years, the quality of play in the BAA was not significantly better than in competing leagues or among leading independent clubs such as the Harlem Globetrotters. For instance, the 1947 ABL finalist Baltimore Bullets moved to the BAA and won that league's 1948 title, and the 1948 NBL champion Minneapolis Lakers won the 1949 BAA title.

Before the 1948–49 season, the BAA lured away several NBL teams—the Fort Wayne Pistons, Indianapolis Kautskys, Minneapolis Lakers, and Rochester Royals—with the prospect of playing in major venues such as Boston Garden and Madison Square Garden. The NBL hit back by outbidding the BAA for the services of several players, including Al Cervi, rookie Dolph Schayes and five stars from the University of Kentucky, while also gaining the upper hand in Indianapolis with the creation of the Indianapolis Olympians while the Kautskys folded. With several teams facing financial difficulties, the BAA and the NBL agreed to merge on August 3, 1949, to create the National Basketball Association. BAA president Maurice Podoloff became the president of the NBA while NBL chairman Ike Duffey became the chairman. The NBA later adopted the BAA's history and statistics as its own but did not do the same for NBL records and statistics.

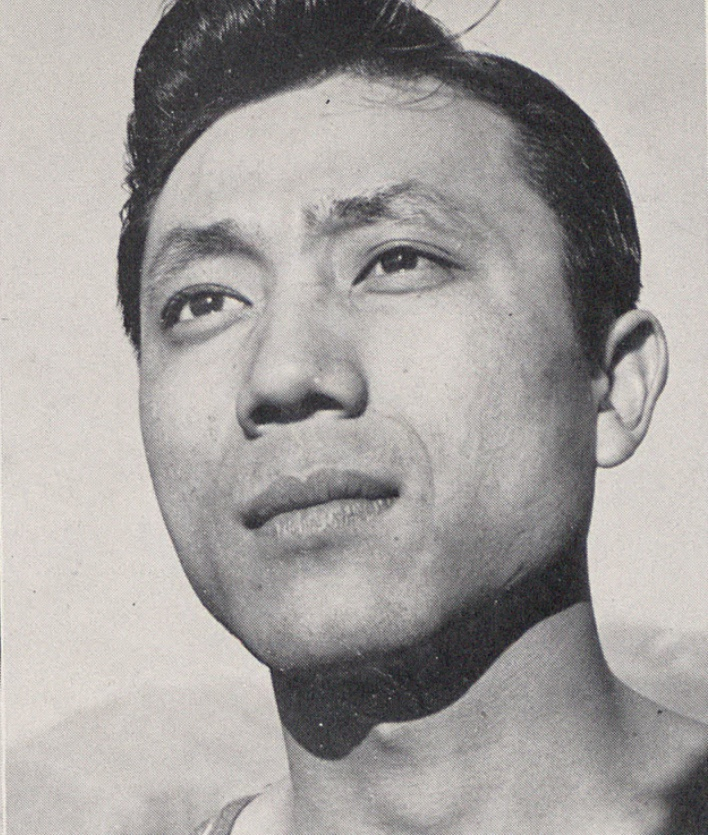
Asian American point guard Wat Misaka broke BAA/NBA's color barrier as the first non-white player to play in the BAA in 1947.

The new league had 17 franchises located in a mix of large and small cities, as well as large arenas and smaller gymnasiums and armories. In 1950, the NBA consolidated to 11 franchises, then in 1954–55 shrank to eight: the New York Knicks, Boston Celtics, Philadelphia Warriors, Minneapolis Lakers, Rochester Royals, Fort Wayne Pistons, Milwaukee Hawks, and Syracuse Nationals. All of these teams remain in the league today, albeit the latter six in new cities. During the contraction, the league's smaller-city franchises moved to larger cities. The Hawks shifted from the Tri-Cities to Milwaukee in 1951, then to St. Louis in 1955. In 1957, the Rochester Royals moved from Rochester, New York, to Cincinnati and the Pistons moved from Fort Wayne, Indiana, to Detroit.

Wataru Misaka, who was Japanese-American, is considered to have broken the NBA color barrier in the 1947–48 season, when he played for the New York Knicks in the BAA. He remained the league's only non-white player until the first African-American, Harold Hunter, signed with the Washington Capitols in 1950. Hunter was cut from the team during training camp, but several other African Americans played in the league later that year, including Chuck Cooper with the Celtics, Nathaniel "Sweetwater" Clifton with the Knicks, and Earl Lloyd with the Washington Capitols. During this period, the Minneapolis Lakers won five NBA championships and established themselves as the league's first dynasty; their squad was led by center George Mikan, the NBA's first superstar. In 1954, the league introduced the 24-second shot clock to encourage shooting and discourage stalling.

=== Celtics' dominance, league expansion and competition (1956–1979) ===
In 1957, rookie center Bill Russell joined the Boston Celtics, which already had guard Bob Cousy and coach Red Auerbach, and went on to lead the franchise to 11 NBA titles in thirteen seasons. Center Wilt Chamberlain entered the league with the Warriors in 1959 and became a star of the 1960s, setting single-game records in scoring (100) and rebounding (55). Russell's rivalry with Chamberlain became one of the greatest rivalries in the history of American team sports.

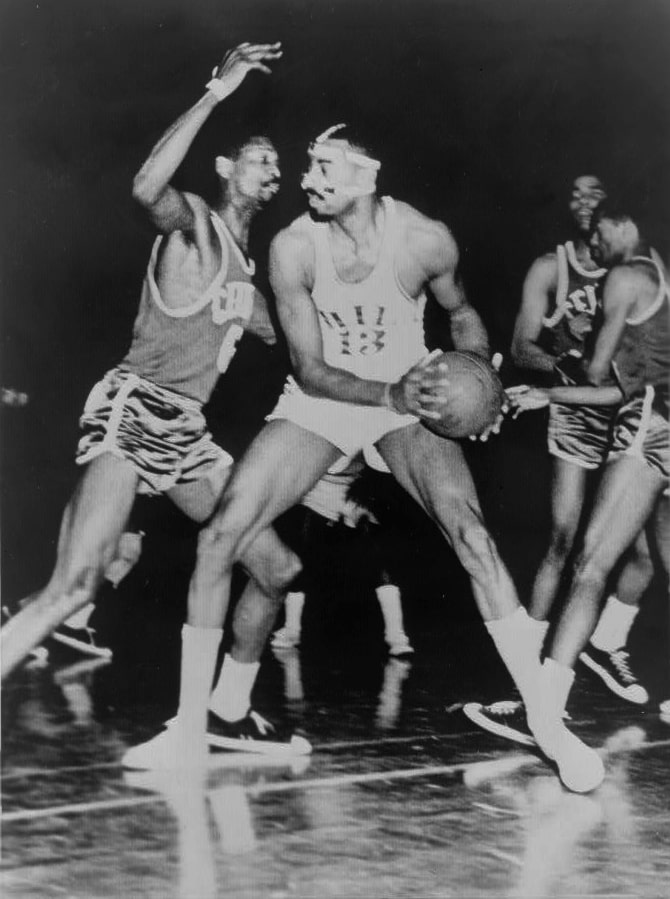
Bill Russell defending against Wilt Chamberlain in 1966

The 1960s were dominated by the Celtics. Led by Russell, Cousy, and Auerbach, Boston won eight straight championships from 1959 to 1966—the longest championship streak in American professional sports. They did not win the title in 1966–67, but regained it in the 1967–68 season and repeated in 1969, earning nine of the decade's championship banners.

Through this period, the NBA continued to evolve with the shift of the Minneapolis Lakers to Los Angeles, the Philadelphia Warriors to San Francisco, the Syracuse Nationals to Philadelphia to become the Philadelphia 76ers, and the St. Louis Hawks moving to Atlanta, as well as the addition of its first expansion franchises. The Chicago Packers (now Washington Wizards) became the ninth NBA team in 1961. From 1966 to 1968, the league expanded from 9 to 14 teams, introducing the Chicago Bulls, Seattle SuperSonics (now Oklahoma City Thunder), San Diego Rockets (who moved to Houston four years later), Milwaukee Bucks, and Phoenix Suns.

In 1967, the league faced a new external threat with the formation of the American Basketball Association (ABA). The leagues engaged in a bidding war. The NBA landed the most important college star of the era, Kareem Abdul-Jabbar (then known as Lew Alcindor), who went on to become the league's best player of the 1970s. However, the NBA's leading scorer, Rick Barry, jumped to the ABA, as did four veteran referees—Norm Drucker, Earl Strom, John Vanak, and Joe Gushue.

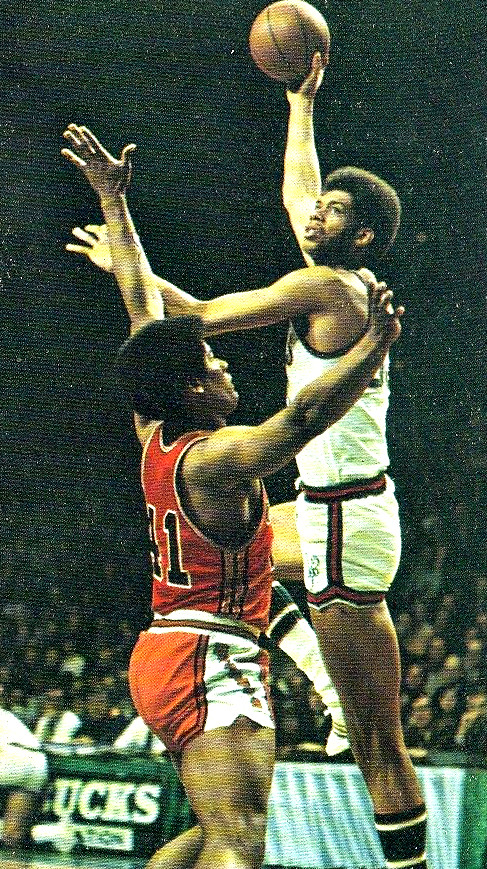
Kareem Abdul-Jabbar, shown shooting his signature "skyhook" shot, was a record six-time MVP winner.

In 1969, Alan Siegel, who oversaw the design of Jerry Dior's Major League Baseball logo the previous year, created the modern NBA logo inspired by the MLB's. It incorporates the silhouette of Jerry West, based on a photo by Wen Roberts. The NBA would not confirm that a particular player was used because, according to Siegel, "They want to institutionalize it rather than individualize it. It's become such a ubiquitous, classic symbol and focal point of their identity and their licensing program that they don't necessarily want to identify it with one player." The logo debuted in 1971 (with a small change to the typeface on the NBA wordmark in 2017) and would remain a fixture of the NBA brand.

The ABA signed a number of major stars in the 1970s, including Julius Erving of the Virginia Squires, in part because it allowed teams to sign college undergraduates. From 1966 to 1974, the NBA grew from nine franchises to 18. In 1970, the Portland Trail Blazers, Cleveland Cavaliers, and Buffalo Braves (now the Los Angeles Clippers) expanded the league to 17. The New Orleans Jazz (now in Utah) came aboard in 1974. After the 1976 season, the leagues reached a settlement that would add four ABA franchises to the NBA—the San Antonio Spurs, Denver Nuggets, Indiana Pacers, and New York Nets (now the Brooklyn Nets)—bringing the number of NBA teams to 22. Some of the biggest stars of this era were Abdul-Jabbar, Barry, Dave Cowens, Erving, Elvin Hayes, Walt Frazier, Moses Malone, Artis Gilmore, George Gervin, Dan Issel, and Pete Maravich. The end of the decade saw declining television ratings, low attendance, and drug-related player issues – both perceived and real – that threatened to derail the league.

=== Surging popularity and Bulls' dynasty (1979–1998) ===
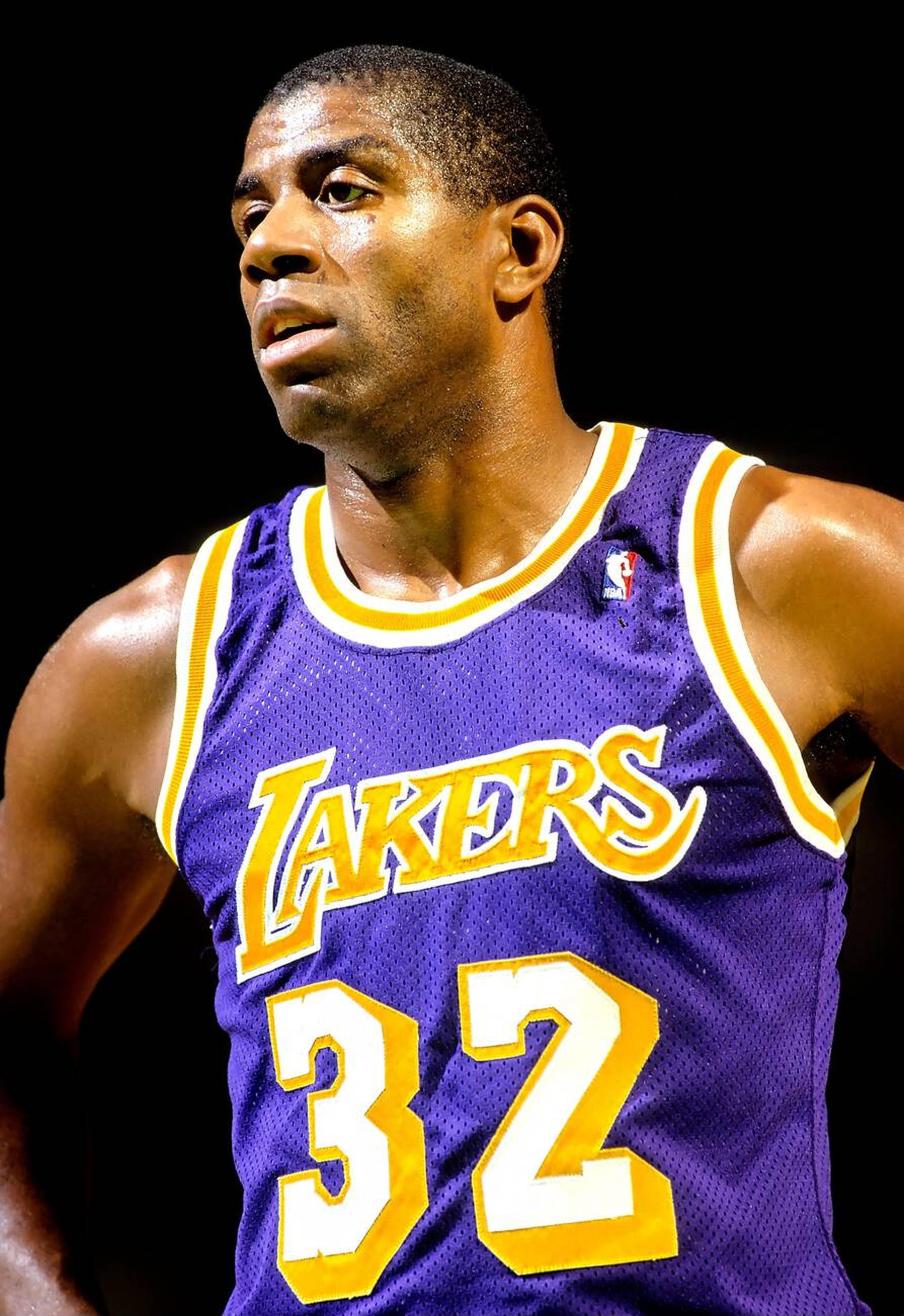
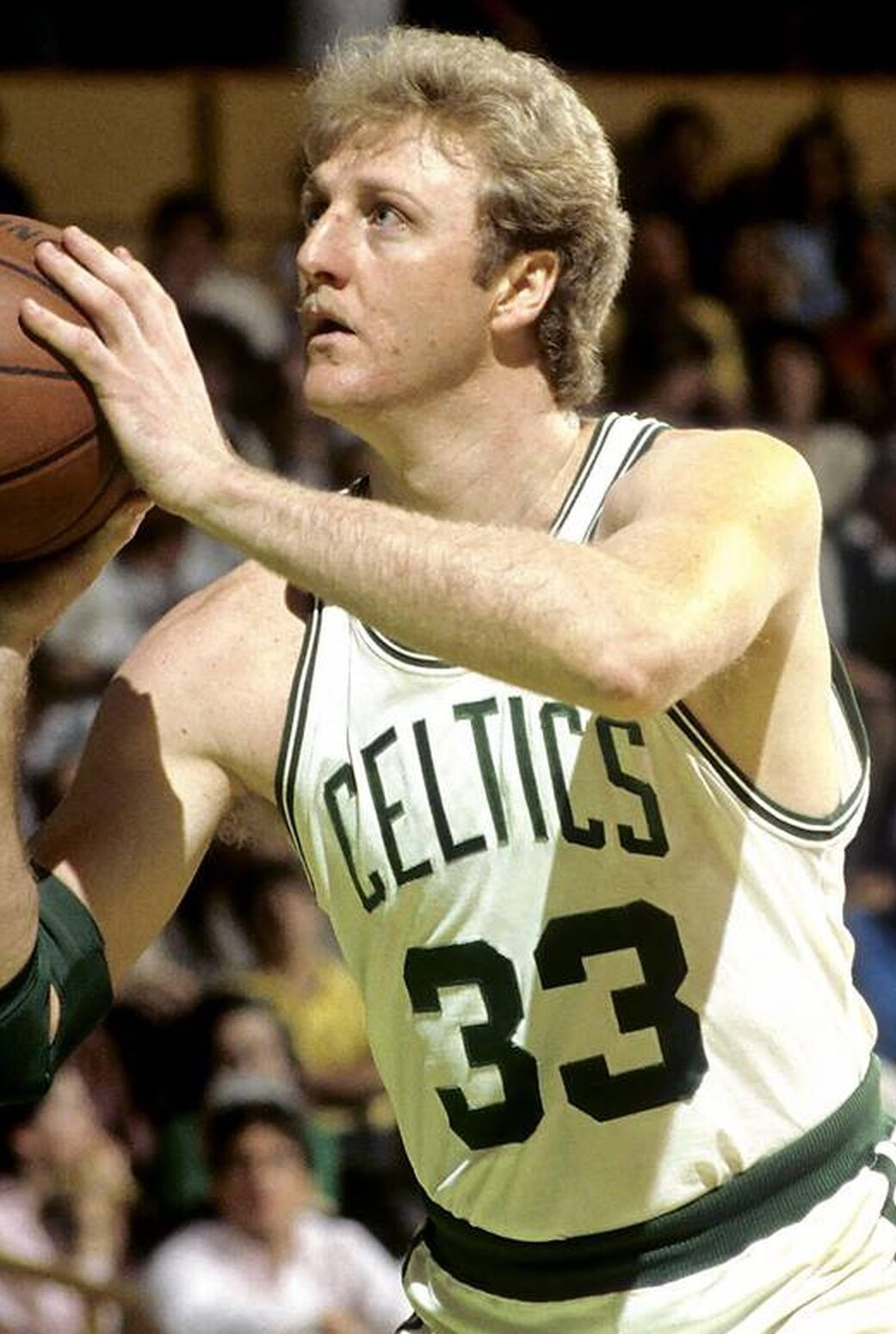
Both Magic Johnson and Larry Bird became key stars for the NBA during the 1980s.

The league added the ABA's three-point field goal in 1979. That same year, rookies Larry Bird and Magic Johnson joined the Boston Celtics and Los Angeles Lakers respectively, helping to draw fans to the league. The two had faced each other in the 1979 NCAA Division I Basketball Championship Game, and they later played against each other in three NBA Finals (1984, 1985, and 1987). In the 10 seasons of the 1980s, Johnson led the Lakers to five titles while Bird led the Celtics to three titles. Also in the early 1980s, the NBA added another expansion franchise, the Dallas Mavericks, bringing the league to 23 teams. Later, Bird won the first three three-point shooting contests. On February 1, 1984 David Stern became commissioner of the NBA; he would lead the league to new heights of popularity and profitability.

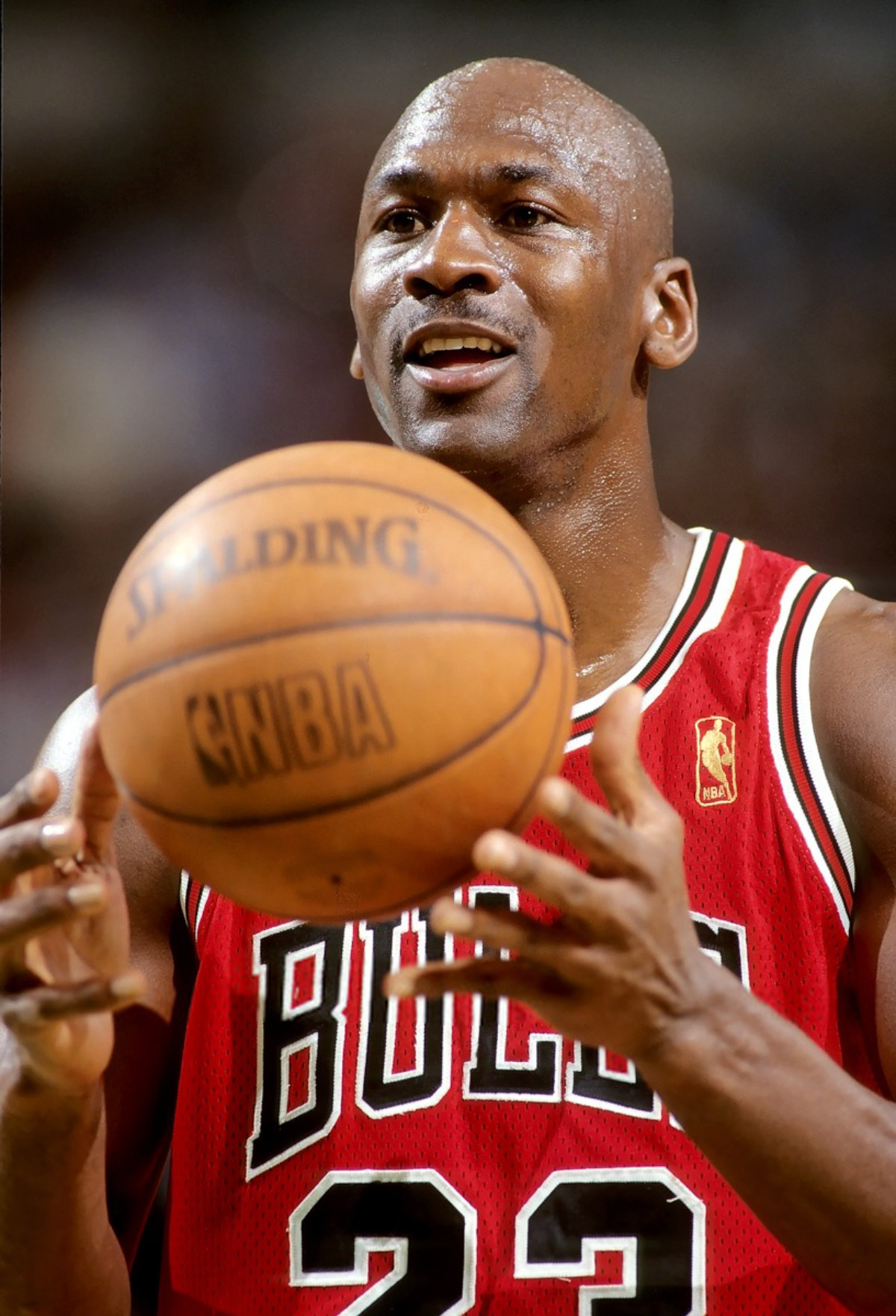
Michael Jordan became the league's most popular player during the 1990s, while leading the Chicago Bulls to six championships.

Michael Jordan entered the league in 1984 with the Chicago Bulls, spurring more interest. In 1988 and 1989, the Charlotte Hornets, Miami Heat, Orlando Magic, and Minnesota Timberwolves made their NBA debuts, bringing the league to 27 teams. The Detroit Pistons won back-to-back NBA championships in 1989 and 1990, led by coach Chuck Daly and guard Isiah Thomas. Jordan and Scottie Pippen led the Bulls to two three-peats in eight years during the 1991–1998 seasons. Hakeem Olajuwon won back-to-back titles with the Houston Rockets in 1994 and 1995.

The 1992 Olympic basketball Dream Team, the first to use current NBA stars, featured Jordan as the anchor, along with Bird, Johnson, David Robinson, Patrick Ewing, Scottie Pippen, Clyde Drexler, Karl Malone, John Stockton, Chris Mullin, Charles Barkley, and star NCAA amateur Christian Laettner. The team was elected to the Naismith Memorial Basketball Hall of Fame, while 11 of the 12 players (along with three out of four coaches) have been inducted as individuals in their own right.

In 1995, the NBA expanded to Canada with the addition of the Vancouver Grizzlies and the Toronto Raptors. In 1996, the NBA created a women's league, the Women's National Basketball Association (WNBA).

=== Lakers' and Spurs' dynasties (1998–2014) ===
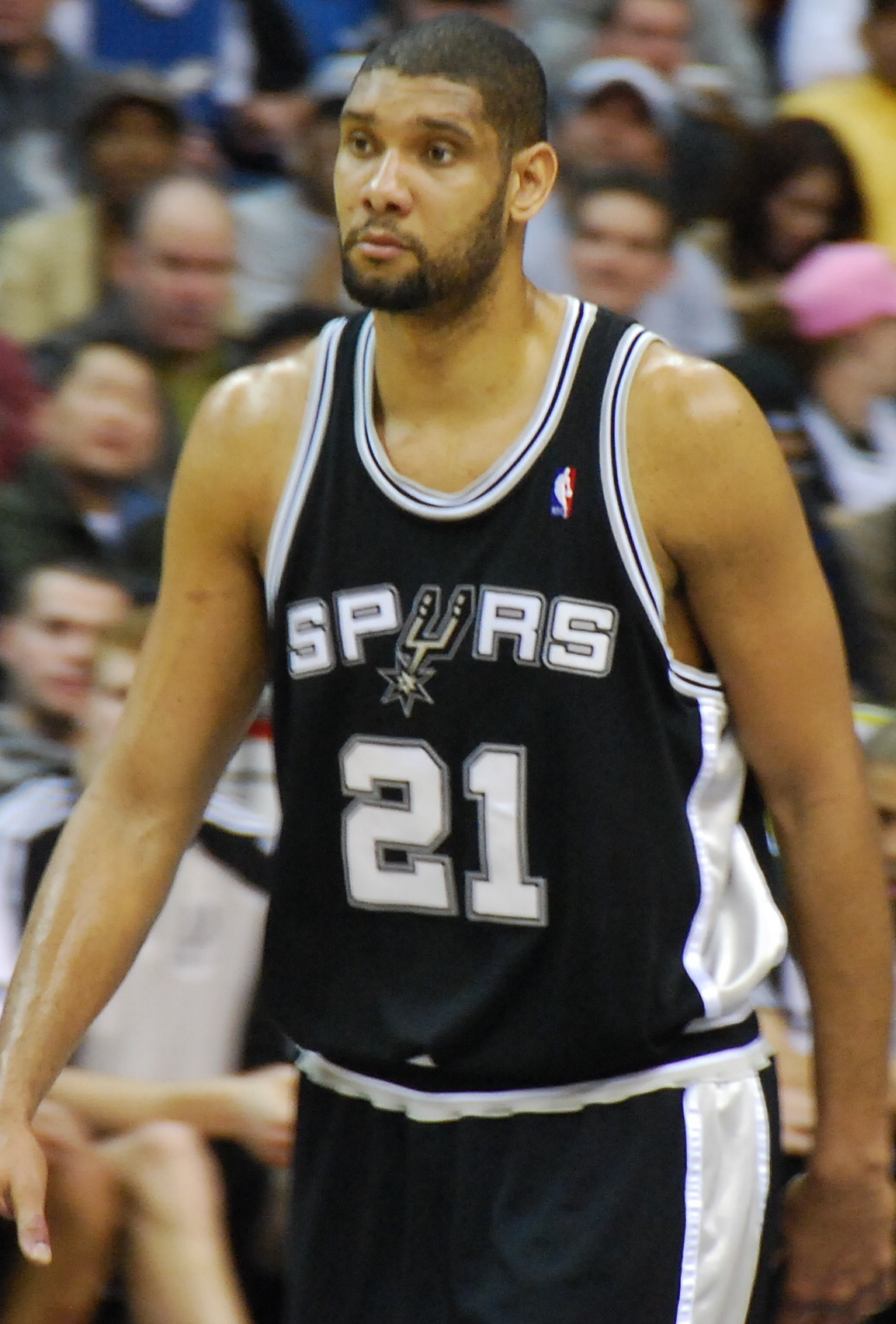
Between 1998 and 2014, Kobe Bryant of the Los Angeles Lakers and Tim Duncan of the San Antonio Spurs led their teams to five championships each.

In 1998, the NBA owners began a lockout that suspended all league business until a new labor agreement could be reached, which led to the season being shortened to 50 games.

After the breakup of the Chicago Bulls championship roster in the summer of 1998, the Western Conference dominated much of the next two decades. The Los Angeles Lakers, coached by Phil Jackson, and the San Antonio Spurs, coached by Gregg Popovich, combined to make 13 Finals in 16 seasons, with 10 titles. "Twin Towers" Tim Duncan and David Robinson won the 1999 championship with the Spurs, becoming the first former ABA team to win the NBA championship. Shaquille O'Neal and Kobe Bryant started the 2000s with three consecutive championships for the Lakers. The Spurs reclaimed the title in 2003 against the Nets. In 2004, the Lakers returned to the Finals, only to lose in five games to the Detroit Pistons.

After the Hornets moved to New Orleans in 2002, the NBA returned to North Carolina, as the Charlotte Bobcats were formed as an expansion team in 2004. New Orleans then temporarily moved to Oklahoma City in 2005 for two seasons due to damage caused to their arena by Hurricane Katrina. The team returned to New Orleans in 2007.

The league's image was marred by a violent incident between players and fans in a November 2004 game between the Indiana Pacers and Detroit Pistons. In response, players were suspended for a total of 146 games with $11 million total lost in salary, and the league tightened security and limited the sale of alcohol.

On May 19, 2005, Commissioner Stern testified before the U.S. House of Representatives' Committee on Government Reform about the NBA's actions to combat the use of steroids and other performance-enhancing drugs. The NBA started its drug-testing program in 1983 and substantially improved it in 1999. In the 1999–2000 season, all players were randomly tested during training camp, and all rookies were additionally tested three more times during the regular season. Of the nearly 4,200 tests for steroids and performance-enhancing drugs conducted over six seasons, only three players were confirmed positive for NBA's drug program, all were immediately suspended, and as of the time of the testimony, none were playing in the NBA.

After the Spurs won the championship again in 2005, the 2006 Finals featured two franchises making their inaugural Finals appearances. The Miami Heat, led by their star shooting guard, Dwyane Wade, and Shaquille O'Neal, who had been traded from the Lakers during the summer of 2004, won the series over the Dallas Mavericks. The Lakers/Spurs dominance continued in 2007 with a four-game sweep by the Spurs over the LeBron James-led Cleveland Cavaliers. The 2008 Finals saw a rematch of the league's highest profile rivalry, the Boston Celtics and Los Angeles Lakers, with the Celtics winning their 17th championship.

The NBA Board of Governors approved the request of the Seattle SuperSonics to move to Oklahoma City on April 18, 2008. The team, however, could not move until it had settled a lawsuit filed by the city of Seattle, which was intended to keep the SuperSonics in Seattle for the remaining two seasons of the team's lease at KeyArena. Following a court case, the city of Seattle settled with the ownership group of the SuperSonics on July 2, 2008, allowing the team to move to Oklahoma City immediately in exchange for terminating the final two seasons of the team's lease at KeyArena. The Oklahoma City Thunder began playing in the 2008–09 season.

The Lakers won back-to-back championships in 2009 and 2010, against the Orlando Magic and the Celtics. The 2010 NBA All-Star Game was held at Cowboys Stadium in front of the largest crowd ever: 108,713.

A referee lockout began on September 1, 2009, when the contract between the NBA and its referees expired. The first preseason games were played on October 1, 2009, and replacement referees from the WNBA and NBA Development League were used, the first time replacement referees had been used since the beginning of the 1995–96 season. The NBA and the regular referees reached a deal on October 23, 2009.

At the start of the 2010–11 season, free agents LeBron James and Chris Bosh signed with the Miami Heat, joining Dwyane Wade to form the "Big Three". The Heat dominated the league, reaching the Finals for four straight years. In 2011, they faced a re-match with the Dallas Mavericks but lost to the Dirk Nowitzki-led team. They won back-to-back titles in 2012 and 2013 against the Oklahoma City Thunder and the Spurs, and lost in a re-match with the Spurs in the 2014 Finals.

The 2011–12 season began with another lockout, the league's fourth. After the first few weeks of the season were canceled, the players and owners ratified a new collective bargaining agreement on December 8, 2011, setting up a shortened 66-game season.

After the 2012–13 season, the New Orleans Hornets were renamed the Pelicans. By May 2014, the Bobcats officially reclaimed the Hornets name, and by agreement with the league and the Pelicans, also received sole ownership of all history, records, and statistics from the Pelicans' time in Charlotte. As a result, the Hornets are now officially considered to have been founded in 1988, suspended operations in 2002, and resumed in 2004 as the Bobcats, while the Pelicans are officially treated as a 2002 expansion team. (This is somewhat similar to the relationship between the Cleveland Browns and Baltimore Ravens in the NFL.)

On February 1, 2014, Commissioner David Stern retired after 30 years in the position, and was succeeded by his deputy, Adam Silver.

=== Warriors' dynasty (2014–2019) ===
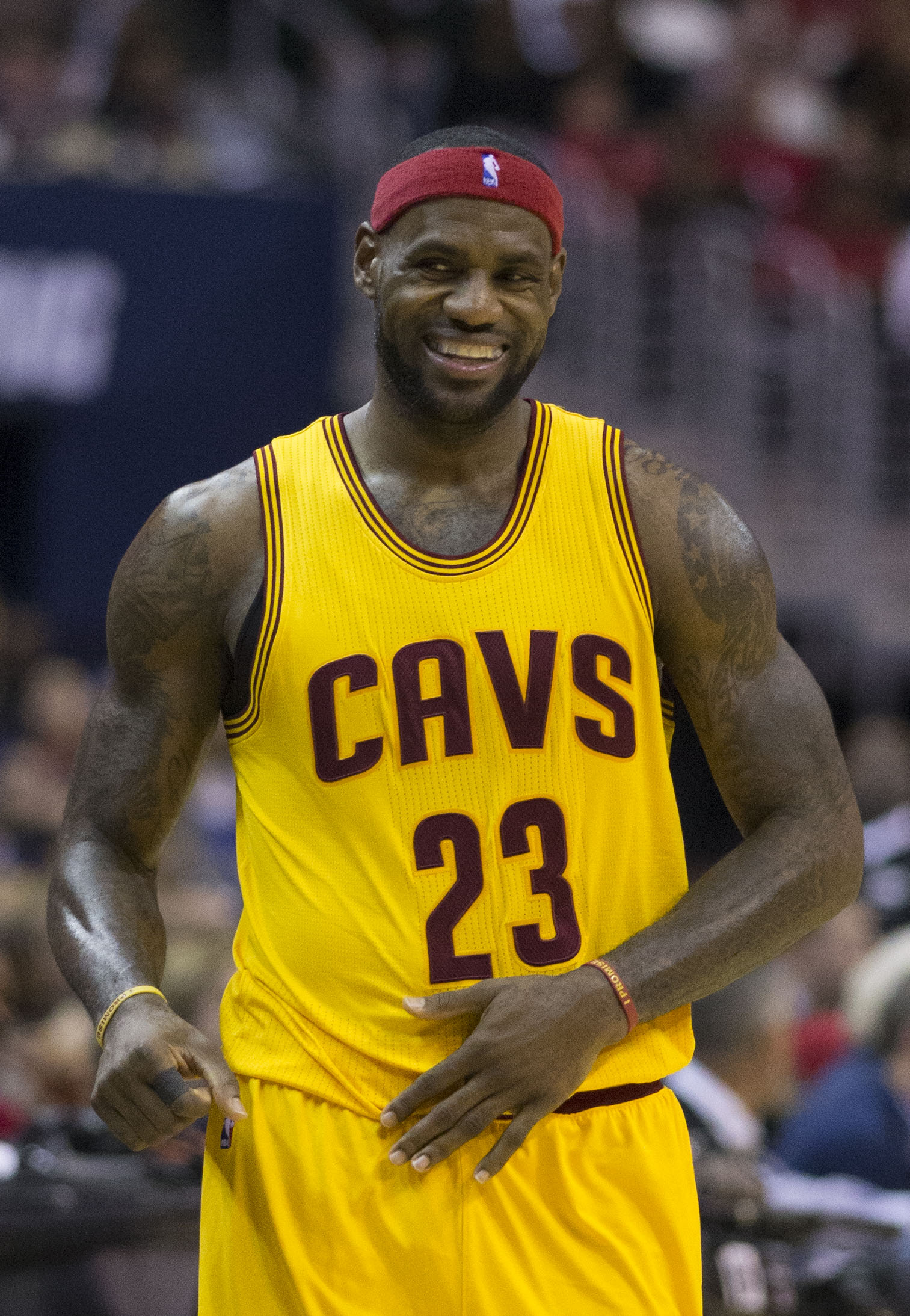
LeBron James became an era-defining star during the 2010s, while leading the Cleveland Cavaliers to a historic title in 2016.

After four seasons with the Miami Heat, LeBron James returned to the Cleveland Cavaliers for the 2014–15 season. He led the team to their second Finals appearance with the help of Kyrie Irving and Kevin Love. The Golden State Warriors defeated the Cavaliers in six games, led by the "Splash Brothers" Stephen Curry and Klay Thompson. The Cavaliers and the Warriors faced each other in the Finals a record four consecutive times. In the 2015–16 season, the Warriors finished the season 73–9, the best season record in NBA history. However, the Cavaliers overcame a 3–1 deficit in the Finals to win their first championship that season, and end a 52-year professional sports championship drought for the city of Cleveland. In the 2016–17 season, the Warriors recruited free agent Kevin Durant and went on to win the 2017 and 2018 Finals against the Cavaliers.

After the departure of James in free agency in 2018, the Cavaliers' streak of playoff and Finals appearances ended. The Warriors returned for a fifth consecutive Finals appearance in 2019 but lost to the Toronto Raptors, who won their first championship after acquiring Kawhi Leonard in a trade.

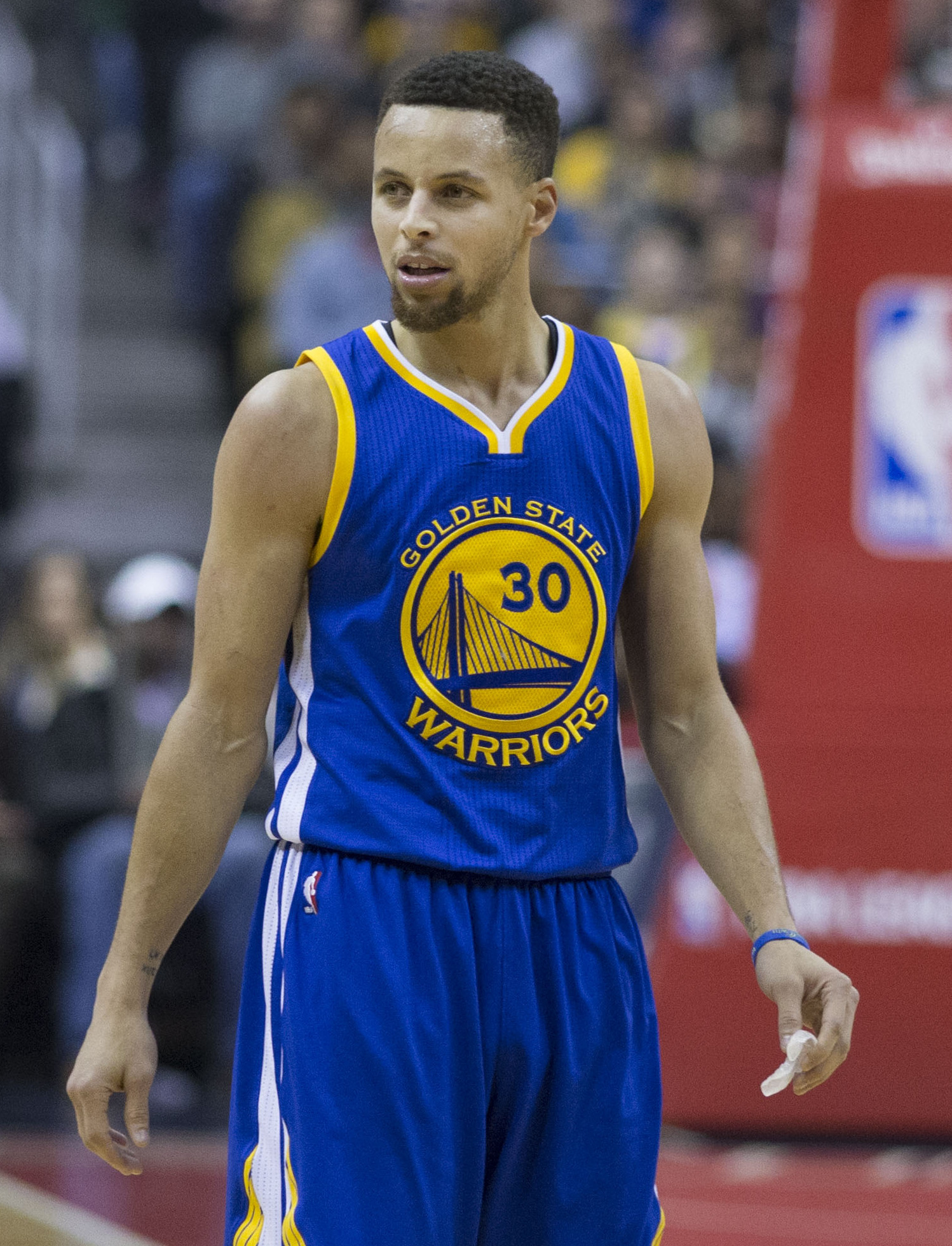
Stephen Curry revolutionized the NBA during the 2010s, while leading the Golden State Warriors to four championships between 2015 and 2022.

This era also saw the continuous near year-over-year decline in NBA viewership. Between 2012 and 2019, the league lost 40 to 45 percent of its viewership. While some of it can be attributed to "cable-cutting", other professional leagues, like the NFL and MLB have retained stable viewership demographics. The opening game of the 2020 Finals between the Los Angeles Lakers and Miami Heat brought in only 7.41 million viewers to ABC, according to The Hollywood Reporter. That is reportedly the lowest viewership seen for the Finals since at least 1994, when total viewers began to be regularly recorded and is a 45 percent decline from game one between the Golden State Warriors and Toronto Raptors, which had 13.51 million viewers a year earlier. Some attribute this decline to the political stances the league and its players are taking, while others consider load management, the uneven talent distribution between the conferences and the cord-cutting of younger viewers as the main reason for the decline.

=== Parity era (2020–present) ===
The 2019–20 season was suspended indefinitely on March 11, 2020, due to the COVID-19 pandemic, after Utah Jazz center Rudy Gobert tested positive for the coronavirus. On June 4, 2020, the NBA Board of Governors voted to resume the season in a 22-team format with 8 seeding games per team and a regular playoffs format, with all games played in a "bubble" in Walt Disney World without any fans present.

During the 2020–21 and 2021–22 seasons, the Milwaukee Bucks would defeat the Phoenix Suns in the 2021 NBA Finals, led by forward Giannis Antetokounmpo, securing their second NBA championship since 1971, and the Golden State Warriors made their sixth appearance in the finals defeating the Boston Celtics in the 2022 NBA Finals, their fourth championship in eight years.

In 2023, the league saw the ratification of a new collective bargaining agreement, which would penalize teams who exceed the luxury tax above certain "apron" thresholds, making it significantly more difficult for teams to sign multiple superstars to maximum contracts. Eight different champions were crowned in seven years from 2019 to 2026, the longest such stretch in league history, with nearly half of the teams appearing in the Finals since 2018, leading numerous outlets to dub this the "parity era" in contrast to the dynasties which dominated previous decades.

We set out to create a system that allowed for more competition around the league. The goal being to have 30 teams all in the position, if well managed, to compete for championships. And that's what we're seeing here.

— NBA Commissioner Adam Silver on the NBA's new era of parity

The 2022–23 season saw the Denver Nuggets, led by center Nikola Jokić, make the franchise's first NBA Finals appearance and defeat the Miami Heat in five games to win their first NBA championship.

The 2023–24 NBA season saw the star-studded Boston Celtics, winning a championship over the Dallas Mavericks, after five conference finals appearances, and a finals appearance marking their 18th championship, their first since 2008.

The 2024–25 NBA season conference finals featured four teams (Knicks, Pacers, Thunder and Timberwolves) who had championship droughts spanning several decades or who had never won a championship. The Thunder would ultimately defeat the Pacers in seven games in the 2025 NBA Finals to win their second title in franchise history and their first in Oklahoma City.

The New York Knicks won their first championship in 53 years at the conclusion of the 2025–26 NBA season, defeating the San Antonio Spurs in five games in the 2026 NBA Finals. Jalen Brunson was named Finals MVP.

=== Affiliated leagues ===
In 1996, the NBA created a women's league, the Women's National Basketball Association (WNBA). In 2001, an affiliated minor league, the National Basketball Development League, now called the NBA G League, was created. The NBA also operates the NBA 2K League and the Basketball Africa League.

== Teams ==
The NBA originated in 1946 with 11 teams, and through a sequence of team expansions, reductions, and relocations, consists of 30 teams – 29 in the United States and 1 in Canada.

The current league organization divides 30 teams into two 15-team conferences of three divisions with five teams each. The current divisional alignment was introduced in the 2004–05 season. Reflecting the population distribution of the United States and Canada as a whole, most teams are in the eastern half of the country: 13 teams are in the Eastern Time Zone, nine in the Central, three in the Mountain, and five in the Pacific.

Overview of NBA teams
Conference	Division	Team	Location	Arena	Capacity	Coordinates	Founded	Joined
Eastern Conference	Atlantic	Boston Celtics	Boston, Massachusetts	TD Garden	19,156	42.366303°N 71.062228°W	1946	
Eastern Conference	Atlantic	Brooklyn Nets	Brooklyn, New York	Barclays Center	17,732	40.68265°N 73.974689°W	1967*	1976
Eastern Conference	Atlantic	New York Knicks	New York, New York	Madison Square Garden	19,812	40.750556°N 73.993611°W	1946	
Eastern Conference	Atlantic	Philadelphia 76ers	Philadelphia, Pennsylvania	Xfinity Mobile Arena	20,478	39.901111°N 75.171944°W	1946*	1949
Eastern Conference	Atlantic	Toronto Raptors	Toronto, Ontario	Scotiabank Arena	19,800	43.643333°N 79.379167°W	1995	
Eastern Conference	Central	Chicago Bulls	Chicago, Illinois	United Center	20,917	41.880556°N 87.674167°W	1966	
Eastern Conference	Central	Cleveland Cavaliers	Cleveland, Ohio	Rocket Arena	19,432	41.496389°N 81.688056°W	1970	
Eastern Conference	Central	Detroit Pistons	Detroit, Michigan	Little Caesars Arena	20,332	42.341111°N 83.055°W	1937*	1948
Eastern Conference	Central	Indiana Pacers	Indianapolis, Indiana	Gainbridge Fieldhouse	17,923	39.763889°N 86.155556°W	1967	1976
Eastern Conference	Central	Milwaukee Bucks	Milwaukee, Wisconsin	Fiserv Forum	17,341	43.043611°N 87.916944°W	1968	
Eastern Conference	Southeast	Atlanta Hawks	Atlanta, Georgia	State Farm Arena	16,600	33.757222°N 84.396389°W	1946*	1949
Eastern Conference	Southeast	Charlotte Hornets	Charlotte, North Carolina	Spectrum Center	19,077	35.225°N 80.839167°W	1988*	
Eastern Conference	Southeast	Miami Heat	Miami, Florida	Kaseya Center	19,600	25.781389°N 80.188056°W	1988	
Eastern Conference	Southeast	Orlando Magic	Orlando, Florida	Kia Center	18,846	28.539167°N 81.383611°W	1989	
Eastern Conference	Southeast	Washington Wizards	Washington, D.C.	Capital One Arena	20,356	38.898056°N 77.020833°W	1961*	
Western Conference	Northwest	Denver Nuggets	Denver, Colorado	Ball Arena	19,520	39.748611°N 105.0075°W	1967	1976
Western Conference	Northwest	Minnesota Timberwolves	Minneapolis, Minnesota	Target Center	18,798	44.979444°N 93.276111°W	1989	
Western Conference	Northwest	Oklahoma City Thunder	Oklahoma City, Oklahoma	Paycom Center	18,203	35.463333°N 97.515°W	1967*	
Western Conference	Northwest	Portland Trail Blazers	Portland, Oregon	Moda Center	19,393	45.531667°N 122.666667°W	1970	
Western Conference	Northwest	Utah Jazz	Salt Lake City, Utah	Delta Center	18,306	40.768333°N 111.901111°W	1974*	
Western Conference	Pacific	Golden State Warriors	San Francisco, California	Chase Center	18,064	37.768056°N 122.3875°W	1946*	
Western Conference	Pacific	Los Angeles Clippers	Inglewood, California	Intuit Dome	18,000	33.9451°N 118.3431°W	1970*	
Western Conference	Pacific	Los Angeles Lakers	Los Angeles, California	Crypto.com Arena	19,079	34.043056°N 118.267222°W	1947*	1948
Western Conference	Pacific	Phoenix Suns	Phoenix, Arizona	Mortgage Matchup Center	16,645	33.445833°N 112.071389°W	1968	
Western Conference	Pacific	Sacramento Kings	Sacramento, California	Golden 1 Center	17,608	38.649167°N 121.518056°W	1923*	1948
Western Conference	Southwest	Dallas Mavericks	Dallas, Texas	American Airlines Center	19,200	32.790556°N 96.810278°W	1980	
Western Conference	Southwest	Houston Rockets	Houston, Texas	Toyota Center	18,055	29.750833°N 95.362222°W	1967*	
Western Conference	Southwest	Memphis Grizzlies	Memphis, Tennessee	FedExForum	18,119	35.138333°N 90.050556°W	1995*	
Western Conference	Southwest	New Orleans Pelicans	New Orleans, Louisiana	Smoothie King Center	16,867	29.948889°N 90.081944°W	2002*	
Western Conference	Southwest	San Antonio Spurs	San Antonio, Texas	Frost Bank Center	18,418	29.426944°N 98.4375°W	1967*	1976

Notes:

- An asterisk (*) denotes a franchise move. See the respective team articles for more information.
- The Fort Wayne Pistons, Minneapolis Lakers and Rochester Royals all joined the NBA (BAA) in 1948 from the NBL.
- The Syracuse Nationals and Tri-Cities Blackhawks joined the NBA in 1949 as part of the BAA-NBL merger.
- The Indiana Pacers, New York Nets, San Antonio Spurs, and Denver Nuggets all joined the NBA in 1976 as part of the ABA–NBA merger.
- The Charlotte Hornets are regarded as a continuation of the original Charlotte franchise, which suspended operations in 2002 and rejoined the league in 2004. They were known as the Bobcats from 2004 to 2014. The New Orleans Pelicans are regarded as being established as an expansion team in 2002, originally known as the New Orleans Hornets until 2013.

== Regular season ==
Following the summer break, teams begin training camps in late September. Training camps allow the coaching staff to evaluate players (especially rookies), scout the team's strengths and weaknesses, prepare the players for the rigorous regular season and determine the 12-man active roster (and a 3-man inactive list) with which they will begin the regular season. Teams have the ability to assign players with less than two years of experience to the NBA G League. After training camp, a series of preseason exhibition games are held. Preseason matches are sometimes held in non-NBA cities, both in the United States and overseas. The NBA regular season begins in mid-October.

During the regular season, each team plays 82 games, 41 each home and away. A team faces opponents in its own division four times a year (16 games). Each team plays six of the teams from the other two divisions in its conference four times (24 games), and the remaining four teams three times (12 games). Finally, each team plays all the teams in the other conference twice apiece (30 games). This asymmetrical structure means the strength of schedule vary between teams (but not as significantly as the NFL or MLB). Over five seasons, each team will have played 80 games against their division (20 games against each opponent, 10 at home, 10 on the road), 180 games against the rest of their conference (18 games against each opponent, 9 at home, 9 on the road), and 150 games against the other conference (10 games against each team, 5 at home, 5 on the road).

Starting with the 2023–24 season, the regular season includes an in-season tournament known as the NBA Cup, in which all games in the tournament (except for the final) count towards the regular season.

The NBA is also the only league that regularly schedules games on Christmas Day. The league has been playing games regularly on the holiday since 1947, though the first Christmas Day games were not televised until 1983–84. Games played on this day have featured some of the best teams and players. Christmas is also notable for NBA on television, as the holiday is when the first NBA games air on network television each season. Games played on this day have been some of the highest-rated games during a particular season.

The NBA has also played games on Martin Luther King Jr. Day (MLK Day) every year since the holiday was first observed in 1986.

In February, the regular season pauses to celebrate the annual NBA All-Star Game. Fans vote throughout the United States, Canada, and on the Internet, and the top vote-getters in each conference are named captains. Fan votes determine the rest of the All-Star starters. Coaches vote to choose the remaining 14 All-Stars. The player with the best performance during the game is rewarded with a Game MVP award. Other attractions of the All-Star break include the Rising Stars Challenge (originally Rookie Challenge), where the top rookies and second-year players in the NBA play in a 5-on-5 basketball game, with the current format pitting U.S. players against those from the rest of the world; the Skills Challenge, where players compete to finish an obstacle course consisting of shooting, passing, and dribbling in the fastest time; the Three Point Contest, where players compete to score the highest number of three-point field goals in a given time; and the NBA Slam Dunk Contest, where players compete to dunk the ball in the most entertaining way according to the judges. These other attractions have varying names which include the names of the various sponsors who have paid for naming rights.

Shortly after the All-Star break is the trade deadline, which is set to fall on the 16th Thursday of the season (usually in February) at 3 pm Eastern Time. After this date, teams are not allowed to exchange players with each other for the remainder of the season, although they may still sign and release players. Major trades are often completed right before the trading deadline, making that day a hectic time for general managers.

Around the middle of April, the regular season ends. It is during this time that voting begins for individual awards, as well as the selection of the honorary, league-wide, postseason teams. The Sixth Man of the Year Award is given to the best player coming off the bench (must have more games coming off the bench than actual games started). The Rookie of the Year Award is awarded to the most outstanding first-year player. The Most Improved Player Award is awarded to the player who is deemed to have shown the most improvement from the previous season. The Defensive Player of the Year Award is awarded to the league's best defender. The Coach of the Year Award is awarded to the coach that has made the most positive difference to a team. The Most Valuable Player Award is given to the player deemed the most valuable for (his team) that season. Additionally, Sporting News awards an unofficial (but widely recognized) Executive of the Year Award to the general manager who is adjudged to have performed the best job for the benefit of his franchise.

The postseason teams are the All-NBA Team, the All-Defensive Team, and the All-Rookie Team; each consists of five players. There are three All-NBA teams, consisting of the top players at each position, with first-team status being the most desirable. There are two All-Defensive teams, consisting of the top defenders at each position. There are also two All-Rookie teams, consisting of the top first-year players regardless of position.

== Playoffs ==
The NBA playoffs begin in April after the conclusion of the regular season and play-in tournament with the top eight teams in each conference, regardless of divisional alignment, competing for the league's championship title, the Larry O'Brien Championship Trophy. Seeds are awarded in strict order of regular season record (with a tiebreaker system used as needed).

Having a higher seed offers several advantages. Since the first seed begins the playoffs playing against the eighth seed, the second seed plays the seventh seed, the third seed plays the sixth seed, and the fourth seed plays the fifth seed, having a higher seed typically means a team faces a weaker opponent in the first round. The team in each series with the better record has home-court advantage, including the First Round.

The league began using its current format, with the top eight teams in each conference advancing regardless of divisional alignment, in the 2015–16 season. Previously, the top three seeds went to the division winners.

The playoffs follow a tournament format. Each team plays an opponent in a best-of-seven series, with the first team to win four games advancing into the next round, while the other team is eliminated from the playoffs. In the next round, the successful team plays against another advancing team of the same conference. All but one team in each conference are eliminated from the playoffs. Since the NBA does not re-seed teams, the playoff bracket in each conference uses a traditional design, with the winner of the series matching the first- and eighth-seeded teams playing the winner of the series matching the fourth- and fifth-seeded teams, and the winner of the series matching the second- and seventh-seeded teams playing the winner of the series matching the third- and sixth-seeded teams. In every round, the best-of-7 series follows a 2–2–1–1–1 home-court pattern, meaning that one team will have home court in games 1, 2, 5, and 7, while the other plays at home in games 3, 4, and 6. From 1985 to 2013, the NBA Finals followed a 2–3–2 pattern, meaning that one team had home court in games 1, 2, 6, and 7, while the other played at home in games 3, 4, and 5.

The final playoff round, a best-of-seven series between the victors of both conferences, is known as the NBA Finals and is held annually in June (sometimes, the series will start in late May). The winner of the NBA Finals receives the Larry O'Brien Championship Trophy. Each player and major contributor—including coaches and the general manager—on the winning team receives a championship ring. In addition, the league awards the Bill Russell NBA Finals Most Valuable Player Award to the best performing player of the series.

== Championships ==
The Boston Celtics have the most championships, with 18 NBA Finals wins. The Los Angeles Lakers have the second-most with 17; the Golden State Warriors and Chicago Bulls have the third- and fourth-most, respectively, with seven and six titles.

Overview of NBA champions
Teams	Win	Loss	Total	Year(s) won	Year(s) runner-up
Boston Celtics	18	5	23	1957, 1959, 1960, 1961, 1962, 1963, 1964, 1965, 1966, 1968, 1969, 1974, 1976, 1981, 1984, 1986, 2008, 2024	1958, 1985, 1987, 2010, 2022
Minneapolis/Los Angeles Lakers	17	15	32	1949, 1950, 1952, 1953, 1954, 1972, 1980, 1982, 1985, 1987, 1988, 2000, 2001, 2002, 2009, 2010, 2020	1959, 1962, 1963, 1965, 1966, 1968, 1969, 1970, 1973, 1983, 1984, 1989, 1991, 2004, 2008
Philadelphia/San Francisco/Golden State Warriors	7	5	12	1947, 1956, 1975, 2015, 2017, 2018, 2022	1948, 1964, 1967, 2016, 2019
Chicago Bulls	6	0	6	1991, 1992, 1993, 1996, 1997, 1998	—
San Antonio Spurs	5	2	7	1999, 2003, 2005, 2007, 2014	2013, 2026
Syracuse Nationals/Philadelphia 76ers	3	6	9	1955, 1967, 1983	1950, 1954, 1977, 1980, 1982, 2001
New York Knicks	3	6	9	1970, 1973, 2026	1951, 1952, 1953, 1972, 1994, 1999
Fort Wayne/Detroit Pistons	3	4	7	1989, 1990, 2004	1955, 1956, 1988, 2005
Miami Heat	3	4	7	2006, 2012, 2013	2011, 2014, 2020, 2023
Seattle SuperSonics/Oklahoma City Thunder	2	3	5	1979, 2025	1978, 1996, 2012
Houston Rockets	2	2	4	1994, 1995	1981, 1986
Milwaukee Bucks	2	1	3	1971, 2021	1974
Cleveland Cavaliers	1	4	5	2016	2007, 2015, 2017, 2018
St. Louis/Atlanta Hawks	1	3	4	1958	1957, 1960, 1961
Baltimore/Washington Bullets (now Washington Wizards)	1	3	4	1978	1971, 1975, 1979
Portland Trail Blazers	1	2	3	1977	1990, 1992
Dallas Mavericks	1	2	3	2011	2006, 2024
Baltimore Bullets (original) (folded in 1954)	1	0	1	1948	—
Rochester Royals (now Sacramento Kings)	1	0	1	1951	—
Toronto Raptors	1	0	1	2019	—
Denver Nuggets	1	0	1	2023	—
Phoenix Suns	0	3	3	—	1976, 1993, 2021
Utah Jazz (formerly New Orleans Jazz)	0	2	2	—	1997, 1998
New Jersey Nets (now Brooklyn Nets)	0	2	2	—	2002, 2003
Orlando Magic	0	2	2	—	1995, 2009
Indiana Pacers	0	2	2	—	2000, 2025
Chicago Stags (folded in 1950)	0	1	1	—	1947
Washington Capitols (folded in 1951)	0	1	1	—	1949

Current teams that have no NBA Finals appearances:

- Charlotte Hornets (formerly Charlotte Bobcats)
- Los Angeles Clippers (formerly Buffalo Braves, San Diego Clippers)
- Memphis Grizzlies (formerly Vancouver Grizzlies)
- Minnesota Timberwolves
- New Orleans Pelicans (formerly New Orleans Hornets, New Orleans/Oklahoma City Hornets)

== Media coverage ==
As one of the major sports leagues in North America, the NBA has a long history of partnerships with television networks in the United States. The NBA signed a contract with DuMont Television Network in its eighth season, the 1953–54 season, marking the first year the NBA had a national television broadcaster. Similar to the National Football League, the lack of television stations led to NBC taking over the rights from the 1954–55 season until April 1962–NBC's first tenure with the NBA. The 2025–26 season marks the first year of 11-year agreements with broadcast networks ABC and NBC, pay television network ESPN, and streaming services Peacock and Amazon Prime Video to nationally televise games in the United States. Games that are not broadcast nationally are usually aired over regional sports networks specific to the area where the teams are located.

In April 2026, Reuters and the National Basketball Association entered into a partnership to globally distribute game highlights and official league content, aiming to expand the NBA's media reach and enhance its international revenue streams.

== Marketing and social responsibility ==
The NBA announced on April 15, 2016, that it would allow all 30 of its teams to sell corporate sponsor advertisement patches on official game uniforms, beginning with the 2017–18 season. The sponsorship advertisement patches would appear on the left front of jerseys, opposite Nike's logo, marking the first time a manufacturer's logo would appear on NBA jerseys, and would measure approximately 2.5 by 2.5 inches. The NBA would become the first major North American professional sports league to allow corporate sponsorship logos on official team uniforms, and the last to have a uniform manufacturer logo appear on its team uniforms. The first team to announce a jersey sponsorship was the Philadelphia 76ers, who agreed to a deal with StubHub.

On July 6, 2017, the NBA unveiled an updated rendition of its logo; it was largely identical to the previous design, except with revised typography and a "richer" color scheme. The league began to phase in the updated logo across its properties during the 2017 NBA Summer League.

The NBA also officially released new Nike uniforms for all 30 teams beginning with the 2017–18 season, replacing the previous supplier, Adidas. All team jerseys included the Nike logo except for the Charlotte Hornets, whose jerseys instead had the Jumpman logo associated with longtime Nike endorser Michael Jordan, who owns the Hornets. In addition, the league eliminated "home" and "away" uniform designations. Instead, each team would have four or six uniforms: the "Association" edition, which is the team's white uniform, the "Icon" edition, which is the team's color uniform, and the "Statement" and "City" uniforms, which most teams use as an alternate uniform. In 2018, the NBA added the "Earned" uniform.

=== NBA Cares ===
The league has a global social responsibility program, NBA Cares, that is responsible for the league's stated mission of addressing important social issues worldwide.

== International competitions ==
The NBA has sporadically participated in international club competitions. The first international competition involving the NBA was a 1978 exhibition game in Tel Aviv, Israel between the Washington Bullets and Israeli club Maccabi Tel Aviv. From 1987 to 1999 an NBA team played against championship club teams from Asia, Europe and South America in the McDonald's Championship. This tournament was won by the NBA invitee every year it was held.

The first regular season NBA league games in Europe took place in 2011. In two matchups, the New Jersey Nets faced the Toronto Raptors at the O2 Arena in London in front of over 18,000 fans.

On March 10, 2025, NBA and Australia's National Basketball League (NBL) announced that in October 2025, the New Orleans Pelicans would play two preseason games at Rod Laver Arena in Melbourne as part of the NBA x NBL: Melbourne Series.

== Ticket prices and viewership demographics ==
In 2022, an average ticket cost $77.75. Depending on the market and stage of the season—preseason, regular season, postseason—a ticket can range from $10 to $100,000. (Note: During the 2019 NBA Finals between the Toronto Raptors and Golden State Warriors, two courtside tickets were sold for $69,287.21 each at Oracle Arena.)

=== Viewership demographics ===
According to Nielsen's survey, in 2013 the NBA had the youngest audience, with 45 percent of its viewers under 35. As of 2022, the league remains the least likely to be watched by women, who make up only 30% of the viewership. As of 2014, 45 percent of its viewers were black, while 40 percent of viewers were white, making it the only top North American sport that does not have a white majority audience.

As of 2017, the NBA's popularity further declined among white Americans, who during the 2016–17 season, made up only 34% of the viewership. At the same time, the black viewership increased to 47 percent, while Hispanic (of any race) stood at 11% and Asian viewership stood at 8%. According to the same poll, the NBA was favored more strongly by Democrats than Republicans.

Outside the U.S., the NBA's biggest international market is in China, where an estimated 800 million viewers watched the 2017–18 season. NBA China is worth approximately $4 billion.

== Criticisms and controversies ==
=== Microfiber game ball ===
A new official game ball was introduced on June 28, 2006, for the 2006–07 season, marking the first change to the ball in over 35 years and only the second ball in 60 seasons. Manufactured by Spalding, the new ball featured a new design and new synthetic material that Spalding claimed offered a better grip, feel, and consistency than the original ball. However, many players were vocal in their disdain for the new ball, saying that it was too sticky when dry, and too slippery when wet.

Commissioner David Stern announced on December 11, 2006, that beginning January 1, 2007, the NBA would return to the traditional leather basketball in use prior to the 2006–07 season. The change was influenced by frequent player complaints and confirmed hand injuries (cuts) caused by the microfiber ball. The Players' Association filed a suit on behalf of the players against the NBA over the new ball.

=== Sports betting and illegal gambling ===
==== 2007 betting scandal ====
The Federal Bureau of Investigation (FBI) began an investigation on July 19, 2007, over allegations that veteran NBA referee Tim Donaghy bet on basketball games he officiated over the past two seasons and that he made calls affecting the point spread in those games. On August 15, 2007, Donaghy pleaded guilty to two federal charges related to the investigation. Donaghy claimed in 2008 that certain referees were friendly with players and "company men" for the NBA, and he alleged that referees influenced the outcome of certain playoff and finals games in 2002 and 2005. Commissioner Stern denied the allegations and said Donaghy was a convicted felon and a "singing, cooperating witness". Donaghy served 15 months in prison and was released in November 2009.

According to an independent study by Ronald Beech of Game 6 of the 2002 Western Conference Finals between the Los Angeles Lakers and Sacramento Kings, although the refs increased the Lakers' chances of winning through foul calls during the game, there was no collusion to fix the game. On alleged "star treatment" during Game 6 by the referees toward certain players, Beech claimed, "there does seem to be issues with different standards and allowances for different players."

==== Sports betting ====
In 2018, Commissioner Adam Silver showed support in the Supreme Court's decision to overturn a federal ban on sports betting. Silver thought it would bring greater transparency and integrity as well as business opportunities. Before naming DraftKings and FanDuel co-official sports betting partners of the NBA in 2021, the NBA first named MGM as the exclusive official gaming partner of the NBA and WNBA—the first major American sports league to do so. With a deal between the 76ers and then-sportsbook FOX Bet as the first agreement between an NBA team and a sportsbook app, more teams partnered with operators thereafter. This early acceptance of sports betting translated to basketball being the most bet-on sport in the United States over football in 2023.

==== 2025 illegal gambling prosecution ====
On October 23, 2025, Miami Heat player Terry Rozier, Portland Trail Blazers head coach Chauncey Billups, and former player Damon Jones were arrested by the FBI in connection with a wider federal investigation into sports betting and gambling by various crime families of the American Mafia.

=== Tanking ===
The NBA has frequently struggled to mitigate tanking, the practice of intentionally fielding non-competitive teams to secure a higher position in the upcoming NBA draft, with many commentators describing the NBA's tanking problem as the worst out of all the major North American professional sports leagues. In 2026, the Utah Jazz and Indiana Pacers were fined $500,000 and $100,000, respectively, for deliberately benching healthy players with the intention of losing a game. Commissioner Silver has been especially critical of the practice, and the NBA plans to implement numerous changes starting with the 2026–27 season to discourage teams from deliberately losing games.

=== Donald Sterling ===
Donald Sterling, who was then-owner of the Los Angeles Clippers, received a lifetime ban from the NBA on April 29, 2014, after racist remarks he made became public. Sterling was also fined US$2.5 million, the maximum allowed under the NBA Constitution.

=== Partnerships ===
As part of its November 2021 multi-year partnership deal with the United Arab Emirates (UAE), the NBA hosted two preseason games in Abu Dhabi on October 4 and 6, 2024, marking its third annual trip to the country. However, the Human Rights Watch (HRW) raised concerns, citing the UAE's pattern of using high-profile events to enhance its image. HRW accused the league of being complicit in "sportswashing" the UAE's poor human rights record, while the country seeks to display itself as open country, without addressing the abuses.

On September 30, HRW wrote a letter to the NBA, urging it to implement a human rights risk mitigation strategy, and to ensure that the preseason games were not used as a distraction from the UAE's human rights abuses. The rights organization also pointed out that the UAE hosted the games amidst the reports of the country being directly involved in fueling the Sudanese civil war. A coalition of human rights groups called upon the NBA to cancel the games in Abu Dhabi in solidarity with Sudanese.

== Notable people ==
=== Presidents and commissioners ===
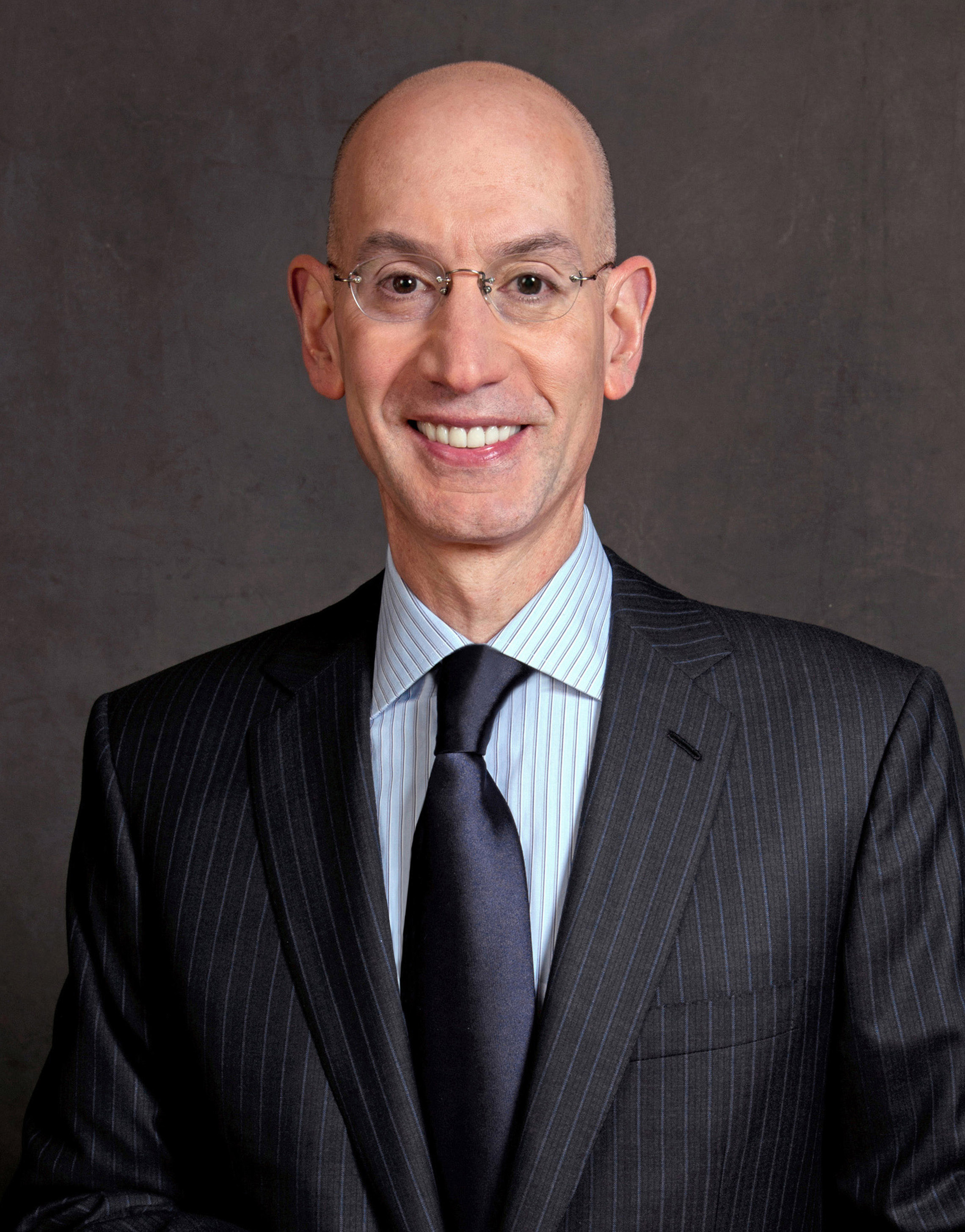
Adam Silver, the NBA Commissioner since 2014

- Maurice Podoloff, President from 1946 to 1963
- Walter Kennedy, President from 1963 to 1967 and Commissioner from 1967 to 1975
- Larry O'Brien, Commissioner from 1975 to 1984
- David Stern, Commissioner from 1984 to 2014
- Adam Silver, Commissioner from 2014 to present

=== Players ===
- NBA 75th Anniversary Team
- Lists of National Basketball Association players

==== Foreign players ====
Following pioneers like Vlade Divac (Serbia) and Dražen Petrović (Croatia), who joined the NBA in the late 1980s, an increasing number of international players have moved directly from playing elsewhere in the world to starring in the NBA. Since 2006, the NBA has faced EuroLeague teams in exhibition matches in the NBA Europe Live Tour, and since 2009, in the EuroLeague American Tour. On November 9, 2007, when the Houston Rockets with Yao Ming faced off against the Milwaukee Bucks with Yi Jianlian, over 200 million people in China watched on 19 different networks, making it the most-viewed game in NBA history.

The 2013–14 season opened with a record 92 international players on the opening night rosters, representing 39 countries and comprising over 20 percent of the league. The NBA defines "international" players as those born outside the 50 United States and Washington, D.C. This means that:

- Players born in U.S. territories such as Puerto Rico and the U.S. Virgin Islands, most notably USVI native Tim Duncan, are counted as "international" even though they are U.S. citizens by birth, and may even have represented the U.S. in international competition (like Duncan).
- U.S.-born players are not counted as "international" even if they were born with citizenship in another country and represent that country internationally, such as Joakim Noah, and Kosta Koufos.

The beginning of the 2017–18 season saw a record 108 international players representing 42 countries marking 4 consecutive years of at least 100 international players and each team having at least one international player. In 2018, the Phoenix Suns hired Serbian coach Igor Kokoškov as their new head coach, replacing Canadian interim coach Jay Triano, making Kokoškov the first European coach to become a head coach for a team in the NBA.

In the 2023–24 season, the Mavericks and the Thunder each had eight international players on their roster. For seven consecutive seasons from 2018–19 to 2024–25, the league's MVP award has been given to an international player.

Below is a list of foreign players who have won NBA awards or have otherwise been recognized for their contributions to basketball, either currently or formerly active in the league:

- Dražen Petrović, Croatia – 2002 inductee into the Naismith Memorial Basketball Hall of Fame, four-time Euroscar winner, two-time Mr. Europa winner, MVP of the 1986 FIBA World Championship and EuroBasket 1989, two-time Olympic silver medalist, World champion, European champion, 50 Greatest EuroLeague Contributors.
- Arvydas Sabonis, Lithuania – 2011 inductee into the Naismith Memorial Basketball Hall of Fame, five-time Euroscar winner, two-time Mr. Europa winner, Olympic gold medalist in 1988 with the Soviet Union and bronze medalist in 1992 and 1996 with Lithuania, 1996 NBA All-Rookie First Team, 50 Greatest EuroLeague Contributors.
- Šarūnas Marčiulionis, Lithuania – 2014 inductee into the Naismith Memorial Basketball Hall of Fame. First player from the Soviet Union and one of the first Europeans to sign a contract with an NBA club and to play solidly in the league, helping to lead the way for the internationalization of the league in the late 1990s.
- Vlade Divac, Serbia – 2019 inductee into the Naismith Memorial Basketball Hall of Fame, two-time Olympic silver medalist, 2001 NBA All-Star, two-time World champion, three-time European champion, 1989 Mr. Europa winner, 50 Greatest EuroLeague Contributors.
- Toni Kukoč, Croatia – 2021 inductee into the Naismith Memorial Basketball Hall of Fame, three-time NBA champion with the Chicago Bulls (1996, 1997, 1998), 1996 Sixth Man Award winner, named in 2008 as one of the 50 Greatest EuroLeague Contributors.
- Peja Stojaković, Serbia – NBA champion with the Dallas Mavericks (2011), MVP of the EuroBasket 2001, member of the all-tournament team in the 2002 FIBA World Championship, 2001 Euroscar winner, two-time Mr. Europa winner, two-time NBA Three-Point Shootout champion, three-time NBA All-Star.
- Dirk Nowitzki, Germany – NBA champion with the Dallas Mavericks (2011), MVP of the 2002 FIBA World Championship and EuroBasket 2005, member of the all-tournament team in the 2002 FIBA World Championship, six-time Euroscar winner, 2005 Mr. Europa, two-time FIBA Europe Player of the Year, 2007 NBA MVP, 2011 Bill Russell NBA Finals Most Valuable Player Award, 2006 NBA Three-Point Shootout champion and 14-time NBA All-Star.
- Hedo Türkoğlu, Turkey – 2008 Most Improved Player Award winner, member of the all-tournament team in the 2010 FIBA World Championship.
- Pau Gasol, Spain – two-time NBA champion with the Los Angeles Lakers (2009 and 2010), six-time NBA All-Star, 2002 NBA Rookie of the Year, two-time Mr. Europa, 2006 FIBA World Championship MVP, four-time Euroscar, two-time FIBA Europe Player of the Year, MVP of the EuroBasket 2009 and EuroBasket 2015, winner of the NBA Citizenship Award in 2012.
- Andrei Kirilenko, Russia – 2004 NBA All-Star, MVP of the EuroBasket 2007, 2007 FIBA Europe Player of the Year.
- Tony Parker, France – four-time NBA champion with the San Antonio Spurs, 2007 NBA Finals MVP, six-time NBA All-Star and 2007 Euroscar winner.
- Manu Ginóbili, Argentina – four-time NBA champion with the San Antonio Spurs, 2008 Sixth Man Award winner, two-time NBA All-Star, 50 Greatest EuroLeague Contributors, Olympic gold medalist in 2004 with Argentina.
- Yao Ming, China – 2016 inductee into the Naismith Memorial Basketball Hall of Fame, first overall pick in the 2002 NBA draft and eight-time NBA All-Star.
- Leandro Barbosa, Brazil – NBA champion with the Golden State Warriors (2015), 2007 Sixth Man Award winner.
- Andrea Bargnani, Italy – first overall pick in the 2006 NBA draft by the Toronto Raptors.
- Giannis Antetokounmpo, Greece – NBA champion with the Milwaukee Bucks (2021), 2021 NBA Finals MVP, two-time NBA MVP, 2017 Most Improved Player, ten-time NBA All-Star.
- Nikola Jokić, Serbia – NBA champion with the Denver Nuggets (2023), 2023 NBA Finals MVP, three-time NBA MVP, eight-time NBA All-Star, 2016 NBA All-Rookie First Team, Olympic silver and bronze medalist.
- Luka Dončić, Slovenia – 2019 NBA Rookie of the Year, six-time NBA All-Star, European champion.
- Victor Wembanyama, France – 2023 NBA Rookie of the Year, 2026 NBA Defensive Player of the Year, two-time NBA All-Star, three-time NBA blocks leader, Olympic Silver Medalist.

On some occasions, young players, most but not all from the English-speaking world, have attended American colleges before playing in the NBA. Notable examples are:

- Nigerian Hakeem Olajuwon – first overall pick in the 1984 NBA draft, two-time champion, 12-time NBA All-Star, 1994 NBA MVP, two-time NBA Finals MVP, two-time NBA Defensive Player of the Year (only player to receive the MVP Award, Defensive Player of the Year Award, and Finals MVP award in the same season,) and Hall of Famer.
- Congolese Dikembe Mutombo – fourth overall pick in the 1991 NBA draft, four-time NBA Defensive Player of the Year, eight-time NBA All-Star and Hall of Famer.
- Dutchman Rik Smits – second overall pick in the 1988 NBA draft, 1998 NBA All-Star, played 12 years for the Indiana Pacers.
- German Detlef Schrempf – two-time NBA Sixth Man Award winner, three-time NBA All-Star.
- Canadians Steve Nash (two-time NBA MVP, eight-time NBA All-Star, Hall of Famer), Andrew Wiggins (first overall pick in the 2014 NBA draft, 2015 NBA Rookie of the Year), and Shai Gilgeous-Alexander (2025 NBA scoring leader, 2x NBA MVP, and 2025 NBA Finals MVP)
- Australians Luc Longley (three-time champion with the Chicago Bulls), Andrew Bogut (first overall pick in the 2005 NBA draft, 2015 NBA champion with Golden State Warriors) and Ben Simmons (first overall pick in the 2016 NBA draft, 2018 NBA Rookie of the Year, three-time NBA All-Star).
- Sudanese-born Englishman Luol Deng – 2007 NBA Sportsmanship Award winner, two-time NBA All-Star.
- Cameroonians Joel Embiid (2023 NBA MVP, seven-time NBA All-Star, 2017 NBA All-Rookie First Team) and Pascal Siakam (2019 NBA champion with Toronto Raptors, 2019 Most Improved Player, four-time NBA All-Star)

=== Coaches ===
- List of current NBA head coaches
- List of NBA player-coaches
- List of NBA championship head coaches
- List of foreign NBA coaches
- Top 10 Coaches in NBA History

==== Female coaches ====
Becky Hammon was hired by the San Antonio Spurs on August 5, 2014, as an assistant coach, becoming the second female coach in NBA history, but the first full-time coach. She was also the first full-time female coach in any of the four major professional sports leagues in North America.

=== Others ===
- List of NBA team owners
- List of NBA referees

== See also ==
- List of NBA regular season records
- List of NBA awards
- List of NBA seasons
- NBA cheerleading
- List of NBA rivalries
- NBA salary cap
- List of NBA playoff series
- NBA Summer League
- List of NBA franchise postseason droughts
- List of NBA franchise postseason streaks
- NBA Store
