= Tim Chen (corporate executive) =

Chinese businessman

Timothy Y. Chen
- Education: University of Chicago (MBA); Ohio State University (Master's degree)
- Occupations: Chairman and President of Motorola China; CEO of Microsoft Greater China; CEO of NBA China; President and Group Managing Director of Telstra International Group
- Years active: 1984–present
- Children: 2

Tim Chen is a Chinese businessman who is the current corporate vice president of Hon Hai Technology Group (trading as Foxconn Technology Group) and president of Asia Pacific Telecom. He was the former president and group managing director of Telstra International Group, former CEO of NBA China and former CEO of Microsoft Greater China.

== Education ==
Chen received an MBA from the University of Chicago and two master's degrees in computer science and mathematics from Ohio State University. Chen earned an undergraduate degree at National Chiao Tung University in Hsinchu City, Taiwan.

== Career ==
From 1984 to 1993, Tim Chen was employed by AT&T Labs in the United States. In 1993, Chen was employed by Motorola, where he served as the general manager responsible for marketing and sales operations. In 2001, Chen became chairman and president of Motorola in China. In 2003, Chen was employed by Microsoft in China, where he became the CEO of Greater China until 2007. From 2007 to 2010, Chen served as the CEO of NBA China. Chen became the president and group managing director of Telstra Corporation Limited in 2012 until 2015.

Chen currently serves as the corporate vice president of Hon Hai Technology Group (trading as Foxconn Technology Group) and president of Asia Pacific Telecom.

Chen has served on various boards of directors. He has been a director of BeiGene, Ltd. since 2016. He previously served as chairman of Autohome Inc. (2012 to 2016), director of Telstra Limited, director of Qingdao Haier Co., Ltd, director of eSilicon Corporation and director of LSI Corporation (2006 to 2008).
