= Climate Pledge Arena =

Indoor arena in Seattle, Washington, US

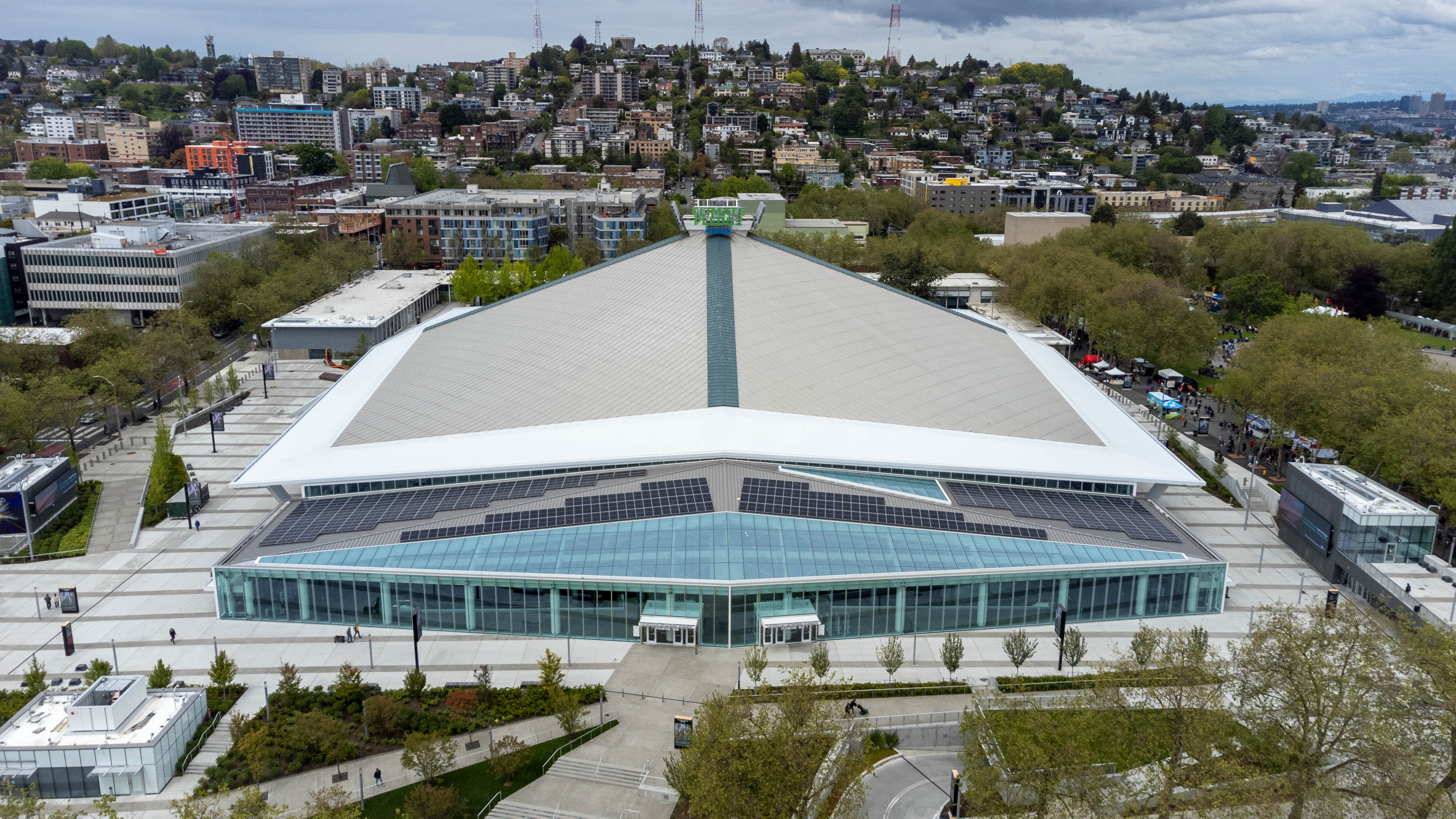
- Aerial view from south in 2022

- Location in the United States Location in Washington
- Interactive map of Climate Pledge Arena
- Full name: Climate Pledge Arena at Seattle Center
- Former names: Washington State Pavilion (1962); Washington State Coliseum (1962–1964); Seattle Center Coliseum (1964–1994); KeyArena at Seattle Center (1995–2018)
- Address: 334 1st Avenue N.
- Location: Seattle, Washington, U.S.
- Coordinates: 47.622°N 122.354°W
- Owner: City of Seattle
- Operator: Oak View Group
- Capacity: Basketball: 18,300; Concerts: 17,200; Ice hockey: 17,151
- Public transit: Seattle Center Monorail; King County Metro

Construction
- Groundbreaking: May 12, 1960
- Opened: April 21, 1962
- Renovated: 1964, 1994–95, 2018–21
- Reopened: October 26, 1995 (as KeyArena); October 19, 2021 (as Climate Pledge Arena)
- Cost: $7 million (1962) ($76.2 million in 2025 dollars) $74.5 million (1995) ($162 million in 2025 dollars) $1.15 billion (2021)
- Architects: Paul A. Thiry (1962); NBBJ (1995); Populous (2021)
- Project manager: CAA ICON (2021)
- Structural engineers: Peter H. Hostmark and Associates (1962); Magnusson Klemencic Associates (1995); Thornton Tomasetti (2021)
- General contractors: Howard S. Wright Companies (1962); PCL Construction (1995); Mortenson Construction (2021)

Tenants
- Seattle Redhawks (NCAA) (1962–1980, 2008–2018, 2021–present); Seattle Totems (WHL/CHL) (1964–1975); Seattle SuperSonics (NBA) (1967–1978, 1985–1994, 1995–2008); Seattle Thunderbirds (WHL) (1995–2008); Seattle SeaDogs (CISL) (1996–1997); Washington Huskies (NCAA) (1999–2000); Seattle Storm (WNBA) (2000–2018, 2022–present); Rat City Roller Derby (WFTDA) (2009–2018); Seattle Kraken (NHL) (2021–present); Seattle Torrent (PWHL) (2025–present)

Website
- climatepledgearena.com
- Century 21–Washington State Coliseum
- U.S. National Register of Historic Places
- Washington Heritage Register
- Seattle Landmark
- Location: 305 Harrison Street; Seattle, Washington
- Area: approx. 6.8 acres (2.8 ha)
- Architectural style: Modern
- NRHP reference No.: 100002406

Significant dates
- Added to NRHP: May 10, 2018
- Designated WHR: March 8, 2018
- Designated SEATL: August 2, 2017

Climate Pledge Arena is a multi-purpose indoor arena in Seattle, Washington, United States. It is located north of downtown Seattle on the campus of the Seattle Center, a 74-acre (30 ha) civic and entertainment center first built for the Century 21 Exposition otherwise known as the 1962 World's Fair. It sits on the site of the original Washington State Pavilion exhibition facility (alternately referred to as the Washington State Coliseum or Century 21 Coliseum), subsequently bought by the city of Seattle and renovated in 1964 into a sports and entertainment venue, the Seattle Center Coliseum. Following an extensive $1.15 billion site redevelopment from 2018 to 2021, the new arena replaced the older facility, then named KeyArena. It reuses the original building's iconic roof and exterior window curtain walls, which were landmarked by the city in 2017 and added to both the Washington State Heritage Register and the National Register of Historic Places in 2018. An extended atrium on its south end houses the entrance to the modern venue. It holds a seating capacity of 17,151 for ice hockey, 18,300 for basketball, and up to 17,340 for concerts and other events.

It is currently home to the Seattle Kraken of the National Hockey League (NHL), the Seattle Storm of the Women's National Basketball Association (WNBA), the Seattle Torrent of the Professional Women's Hockey League (PWHL), the Seattle University Redhawks men's basketball team, and the Rat City Roller Derby league of the Women's Flat Track Derby Association. It has also played host to the Pac-12 Conference's women's basketball tournament and may be used as a host venue for the Big Ten Conference's Women's Basketball and Men's ice hockey tournaments in the future. Though opening in October 2021, Climate Pledge Arena is sometimes considered the oldest arena in the NHL due to the age of the original roof and exterior walls.

The original arena was most notable as the long-time home of the Seattle SuperSonics of the National Basketball Association (NBA). The SuperSonics first played at the facility, then the Seattle Center Coliseum, from their founding in 1967 to 1978. After a seven-season stint in the higher capacity Kingdome, they returned to the arena in 1985. The venue's renovation after the 1993–94 season necessitated the relocation of SuperSonics home games to the Tacoma Dome for the 1994–95 season. The Coliseum was renamed KeyArena after KeyCorp bought the naming rights in 1995. The rights lasted through 2010, though the building maintained the name until its 2018 closure for the site redevelopment. The SuperSonics left KeyArena in 2008 amid a controversial relocation to Oklahoma City. The arena was also known for hosting non-NHL hockey teams, first as home to the Seattle Totems of the original Western Hockey League and the Central Hockey League from 1964 to 1975, followed by the Seattle Thunderbirds of the current Western Hockey League from 1995 to 2008.

KeyArena was the first publicly financed arena in the area that was fully supported by earned income from the building. Arena finances were bolstered for several years by a payment following the settlement of a lawsuit over the lease with the SuperSonics in 2008. However, the lower level of activity and revenue after the departure of the Sonics left little reserve beyond basic building maintenance. In contrast, Climate Pledge Arena was completely privately financed with the city receiving annual rent and a portion of additional revenue generated by events and surrounding parking. Amazon bought the naming rights to the new arena in June 2020, dedicating the arena name to bringing attention to climate change, specifically the pledge promoted by the advocacy group Global Optimism for businesses to reach net zero carbon dioxide emissions by 2040.

== History ==
=== Seattle Center Coliseum ===
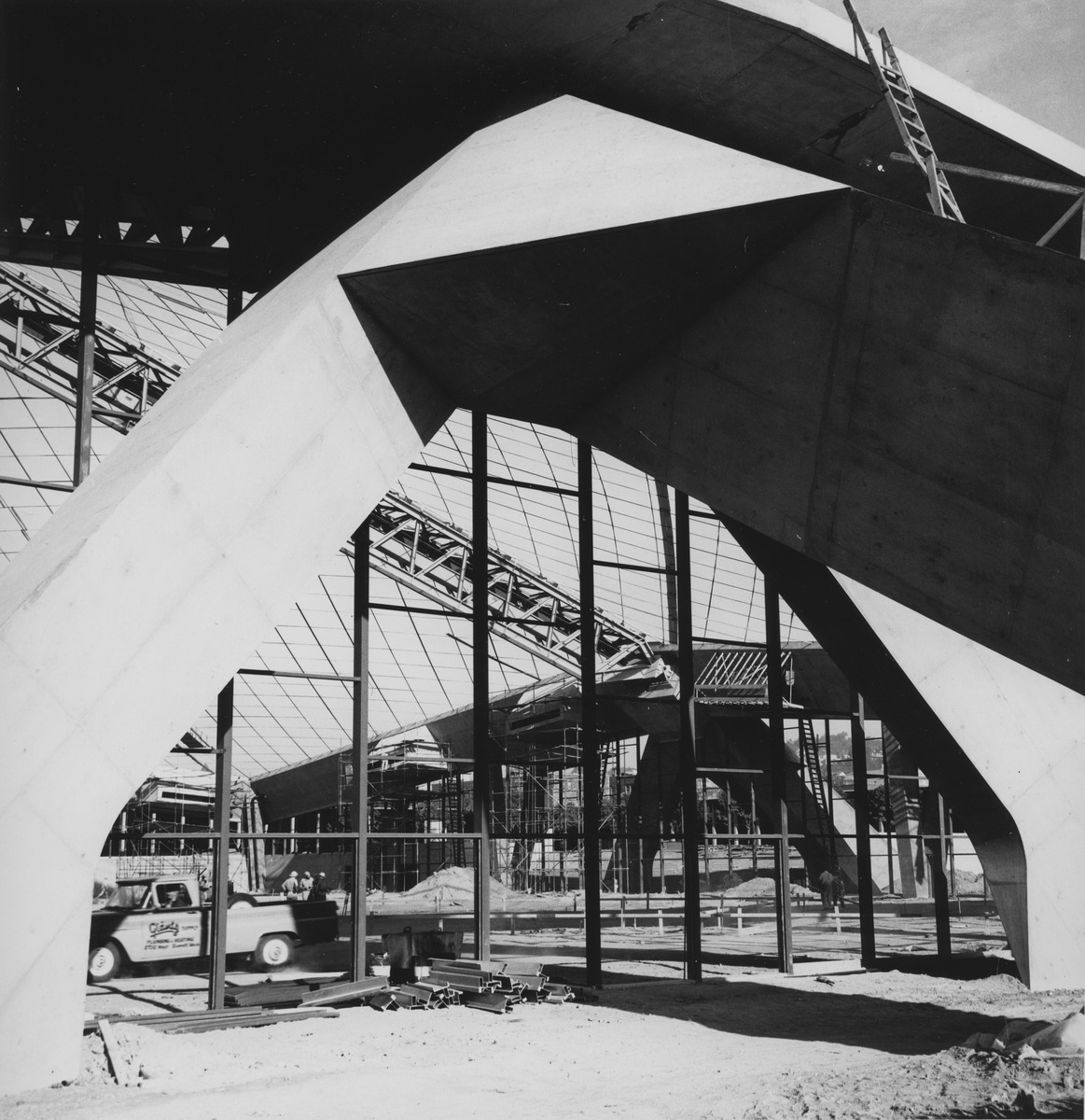
The structure under construction in 1961

The arena opened in 1962 as the Washington State Pavilion for the Century 21 Exposition, the work of architect Paul Thiry. After the close of the Exposition, the Pavilion was purchased by the city of Seattle for $2.9 million and underwent an 18-month conversion into the Washington State Coliseum, one of the centerpieces of the new Seattle Center on the former Exposition grounds. When the newly renovated Coliseum opened, the Seattle University men's basketball team became the arena's first major tenant. In 1964, the facility was renamed the Seattle Center Coliseum. That same year, the Seattle Totems moved into the Coliseum. The Coliseum became home to its most famous resident, the Seattle SuperSonics, beginning with their inaugural season in 1967 and remaining as host throughout most of the team's lifetime.

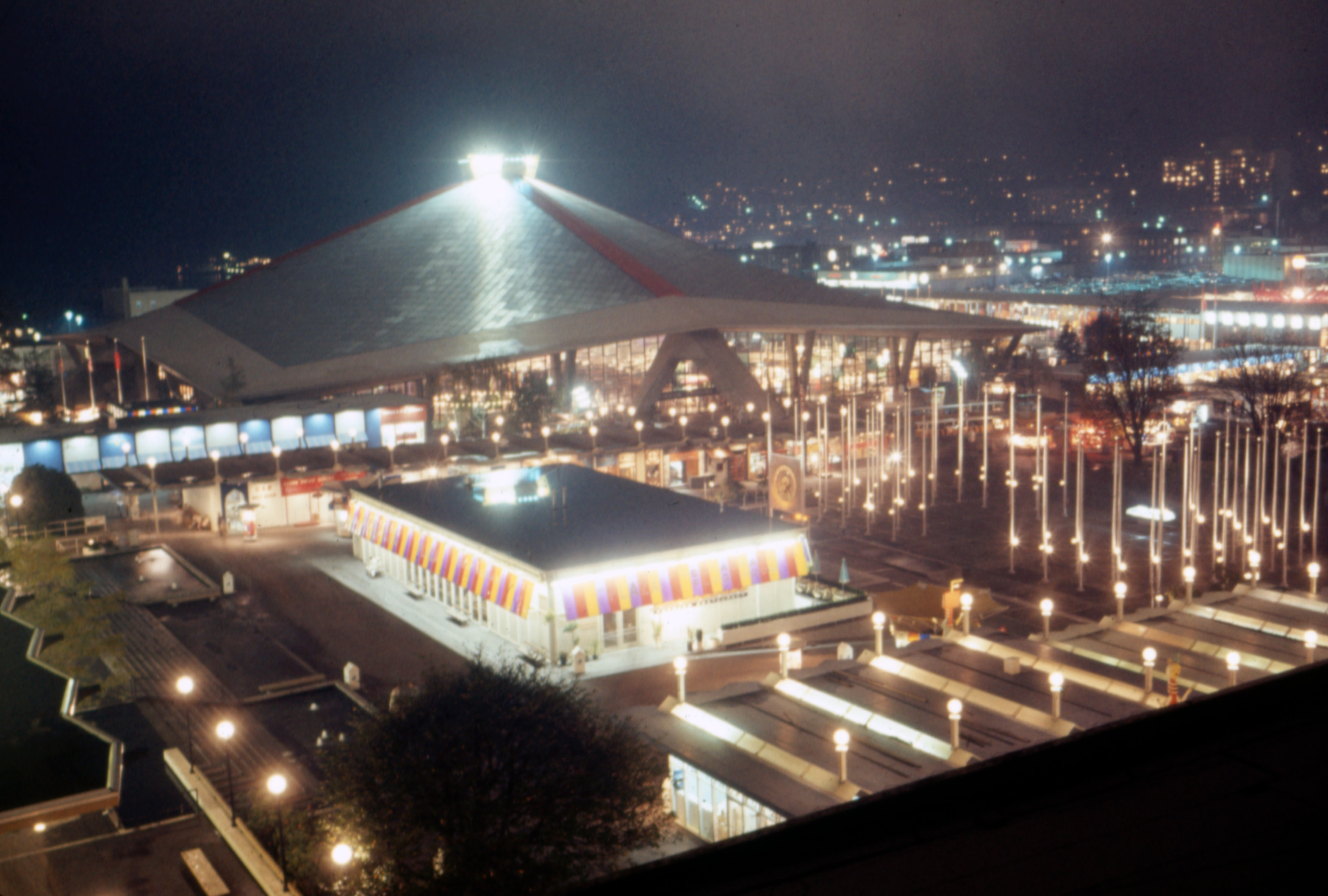
Seattle Center Coliseum at night, circa 1963

The Coliseum in this incarnation hosted two NBA Finals, in 1978 and 1979, both between the Washington Bullets and SuperSonics. The Bullets won in 1978, prevailing in game 7 in Seattle. The Sonics retaliated the following year, winning in Game 5 on the Bullets' home court, thus capturing the franchise's only championship while based in Seattle. Upon the opening of the new Kingdome in 1976, which first hosted the Seahawks of the National Football League (NFL) and the Sounders of the North American Soccer League (NASL), followed by the expansion Mariners of Major League Baseball (MLB) in 1977, the Sonics would begin playing a small number of home games at the stadium. For the championship 1978–79 NBA season, the basketball club moved into the Kingdome full-time. They would call it home through the 1984–85 season, after which the team returned to the Coliseum. During those seven years, the Sonics would occasionally play home playoff games at the Coliseum or Hec Edmundson Pavilion so as to not interfere with the Mariners' regular season home schedule. They would continue to play occasional games at the Kingdome through the late 1980s and early 1990s.

The arena hosted the NBA All-Star Game once, in 1974; the 1987 game had included NBA All-Star Saturday festivities on February 7, where former Sonics star "Downtown Freddie" Brown was the MVP of the legends game, Boston Celtics star Larry Bird won the three-point contest, and Chicago Bulls star Michael Jordan won the slam-dunk competition. The NBA All-Star Game itself for 1987 in Seattle was held at the Kingdome.

In 1983, Barry Ackerley, head of the Washington, D.C.-based television, radio, and billboard company Ackerley Communications Inc., purchased the Sonics from long-time owner Sam Schulman. In the mid-to-late 1980s, the team's on-court success would decline. This was coupled with a sub-par home court experience at the Coliseum, which included the NBA's lone rain delayed game on January 5, 1986, when rain water leaked from the roof onto the court as the Sonics played the Phoenix Suns. Timeouts were called so ball boys armed with towels could do their best to wipe up the puddles, but even so, two players slipped and fell on the wet surface. Early in the second quarter, referee Mike Mathis suspended the game with the Suns up by 11 points. The game was resumed from that point the following night, and Phoenix won by 17.

The arena hosted the basketball competitions of the Goodwill Games in 1990.

Ackerley began exploring new options for an arena. Heavy relocation rumors began to circulate, amongst them a potential move to San Diego or possible sales to groups in other markets like Milwaukee or Toronto. In 2018, Ackerley's son Chris would say that the family was always committed to keeping the team in Seattle, and that "[...] in each case, we stood on our principles that this is a Seattle community asset."

==== Potential replacement by arena in SoDo ====
In 1990, the Ackerleys talked about building an arena east of Lake Washington near Bellevue Square. They would eventually purchase land in the SoDo district near the Kingdome, some of which includes the site that would later become the Mariners' home, T-Mobile Park. Ackerley approached the city about a public contribution to the new arena, but the city was reluctant over fears the city-owned Coliseum would become obsolete. They offered to help finance a renovation of the Coliseum, but the team owner declined. To sweeten the offer, Ackerley sold city leaders on the idea that the new arena in SoDo could also attract a National Hockey League club. The city, along with Denver, had been conditionally granted an expansion NHL franchise in 1974 to begin play in the 1976–77 season. The NHL briefly flirted with relocating the Pittsburgh Penguins to Seattle (and the California Golden Seals to Denver) to address a troubled market and fill the expansion commitment, but ultimately kept the team there. Eventually, the Seattle franchise award was rescinded altogether when the potential ownership group was unable to secure the funds for the expansion fee.

In July 1990, the city council approved a deal for a privately owned $100 million facility to be built on the Ackerley land in SoDo, despite objections over traffic and parking by the Seahawks and Mariners in the neighboring Kingdome. The city's contribution would be to waive about $31 million in tax revenues (about $1 million per year) to potentially be collected on admissions fees at the new arena. It would also pay $2 million for street improvements around the proposed site, including a pedestrian walkway over South Royal Brougham Way. Ackerley also agreed to sign a 30-year lease for the Sonics and to build an 1,800-stall parking garage. Ackerley appeased the Seahawks' concerns, noting the arena would be empty during any NFL games. The Mariners unsuccessfully continued to object, even enlisting then-MLB commissioner Fay Vincent and then-American League president Bobby Brown to speak before the council ahead of their final vote.

During negotiations, Ackerley had asked for a provision to reduce the seating at the Coliseum by 9,000 seats so the older arena could not compete with the new building, but the city would not agree. Another selling point of the new arena were luxury suites, a means to attract corporate money and sponsorship that was then an emerging new revenue stream for sports team owners. Ackerley's financing and agreement with the city hinged on the ability to sell the 70 proposed luxury suites.

Ackerley also committed to submitting an expansion application to the NHL by a September 15, 1990, deadline as part of the arena deal. His son Bill would head the expansion effort, while a competing group led by Microsoft executive Chris Larson and former Seattle Totems player then coach Bill MacFarland was preparing their own application. With the Ackerley application already submitted, the two groups would merge with Larson and MacFarland being primary points of contact with the NHL. Then owner of the Thunderbirds, Bill Yuill, also joined the group. Larson and MacFarland, along with Barry Ackerley and Bill Lear, Ackerley's financial advisor, were set to make a presentation to the NHL's Board of Governors on December 5, 1990. At the meeting, Ackerley and Lear asked to meet with the board first, promptly withdrew their application, and left. Larson and MacFarland were stunned to learn of the development but were unable to pursue any recourse as their names were never on the submitted application.

Thought to play a factor in Ackerley's decision were the significant demands by the NHL for an expansion team: a $50 million expansion fee that was more than any NHL club was valued at the time; a $5 million down payment that would be forfeited if 10,000 season tickets were not sold in the first year – the Sonics had never sold more than 9,000 season tickets; season tickets needed to produce at least $9 million annually, which would've made the tickets the second most expensive for a team in the area at the time; a 20-year lease with a "substantial" share of arena revenues from concessions, parking, and ad signage; priority status for postseason arena dates; and a secured $5 million line of credit in case the league had to take over ownership of the team at any point. Ackerley would not sacrifice Sonics revenues for a hockey team in which he would be a minority investor.

In June 1991, nearly a year after the city agreed to the arena deal, Ackerley announced that the project would not move forward. Increasing project costs, legal disputes, and inability to secure construction financing were cited as reasons to drop the project. Only around 30 of the 70 luxury suites were sold and the Ackerleys were unable to find a corporate buyer for naming rights. Ackerley Communications profits were down, which also contributed to the financing difficulties. A state Supreme Court case brought by Seattle Center employees challenged the constitutionality of the arena deal, while potential lawsuits from the Mariners and trade show organizers and possible legal challenges to environmental review of the project loomed.

=== Rebirth as KeyArena ===
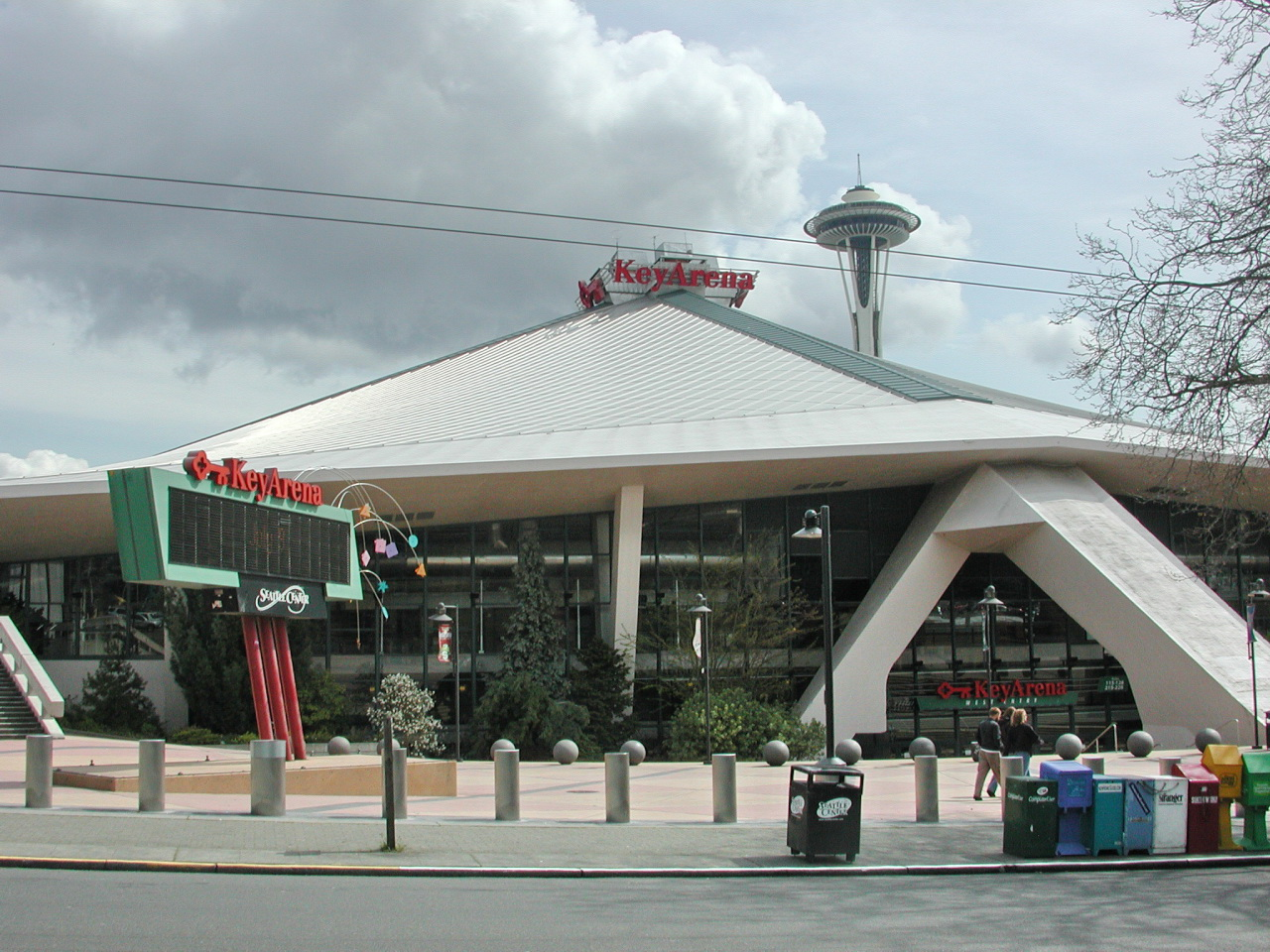
KeyArena in 2008

Newly elected Seattle mayor Norm Rice was concerned over a loss of concerts and events to cities with larger, more modern facilities, and the strong possibility the city could lose the Sonics. The mayor believed that sports unite a community and that Seattle Center would continue to serve as a valuable hub for tourism. At his insistence, a Center commission developed a plan to renovate the Coliseum by excavating the floor to lower it and build a new bowl with more seating. The Ackerleys turned down the renovation concept in favor of building their own arena in SoDo. Though the city preferred the renovation, they would reluctantly agree to the new arena plan. After the SoDo proposal fell through, the Ackerleys attempted to find other investors to no avail. Barry Ackerley would return to the city to ask if they would still consider renovating the Coliseum.

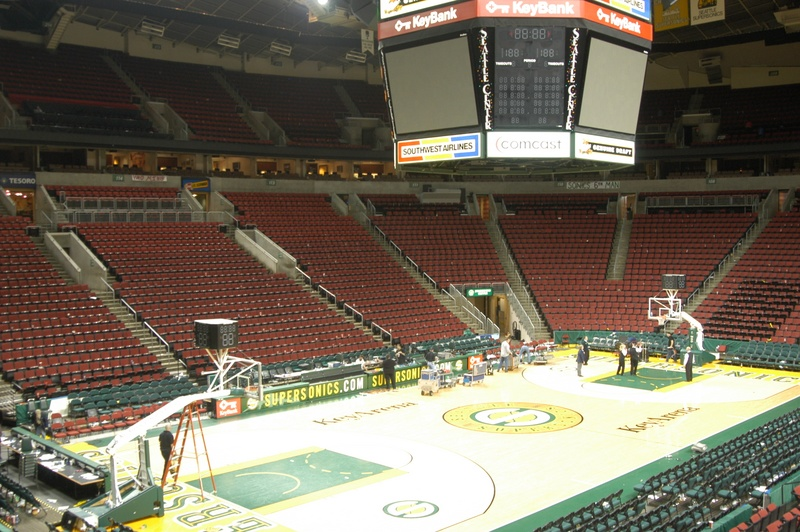
Interior of KeyArena when it served as the home of the Seattle SuperSonics (now the Oklahoma City Thunder)

With renewed interest on all sides, including the city council, the city spent $250,000 studying if it was even environmentally and engineeringly feasible to dig into the ground beneath the building. The plan proved possible and it was found that the compression ring holding the roof could be preserved, saving $15 million in cost and keeping the facility seismically sound against earthquakes. The original cable-suspended roof would be replaced by a conventional fixed roof with steel trusses that would preserve the well-known shape.

The project had an estimated cost of $73.4 million, considerably less than other new arenas of the time in Portland and Vancouver, to be paid with the city's bond capacity. A new kitchen and support building, a parking garage on 1st Avenue N, a new team store, and a tunnel connecting the store to the arena brought the total cost to nearly $127.3 million. New amenities would include 22 concession stands, eight portable stands with vending in the seating, three private sports clubs, and a public sports bar and restaurant. Club-level seating with 1,100 seats would also offer exclusive club, concession, and lounge areas, and a private concourse with 58 luxury suites would also be added.

A mandate of the project was that no taxpayer funds could be used to pay for it. This brought concern from the Ackerleys, but after nearly a year of negotiations a revenue sharing plan was developed. The city and the team would split revenues from suites, concessions, and other items all within the arena to service the debt for the city and provide income to the team. The arena would be the first to finance itself by use of the arena. In May 1993, the city council voted 7–2 in favor of the deal with the Sonics signing a 15-year lease agreement and a guaranteed income of $7 million per year during the lease. The agreement was initially turned down in council committee in the hopes of negotiating a 20-year lease with an increased guaranteed income of $9 million per year starting in year 15. The Ackerleys declined these changes.

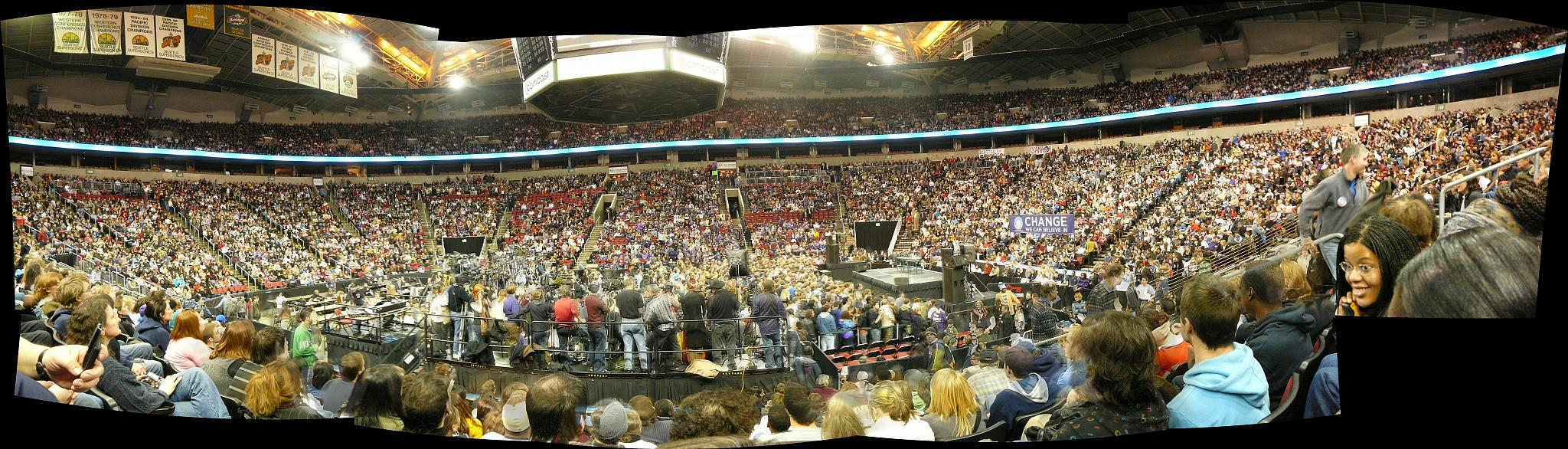
Panorama of the former interior of KeyArena

The Coliseum was rebuilt between 1994 and 1995, bringing the arena up to the NBA standards of the day. The local Seattle office of NBBJ, the second largest architectural firm in the country, was chosen as the architects. In an unusual move, the Coliseum would be closed for a year during the renovation. Construction began on June 16, 1994. During the 1994–95 season, the SuperSonics played their home games at the multi-purpose Tacoma Dome in Tacoma, about thirty miles (50 km) south.

On April 11, 1995, the city sold the naming rights to Cleveland-based KeyCorp, the parent of KeyBank, which renamed the Coliseum as KeyArena. The renovation cost the city of Seattle $74.5 million and the SuperSonics approximately $21 million. The naming rights cost KeyCorp $15.1 million.

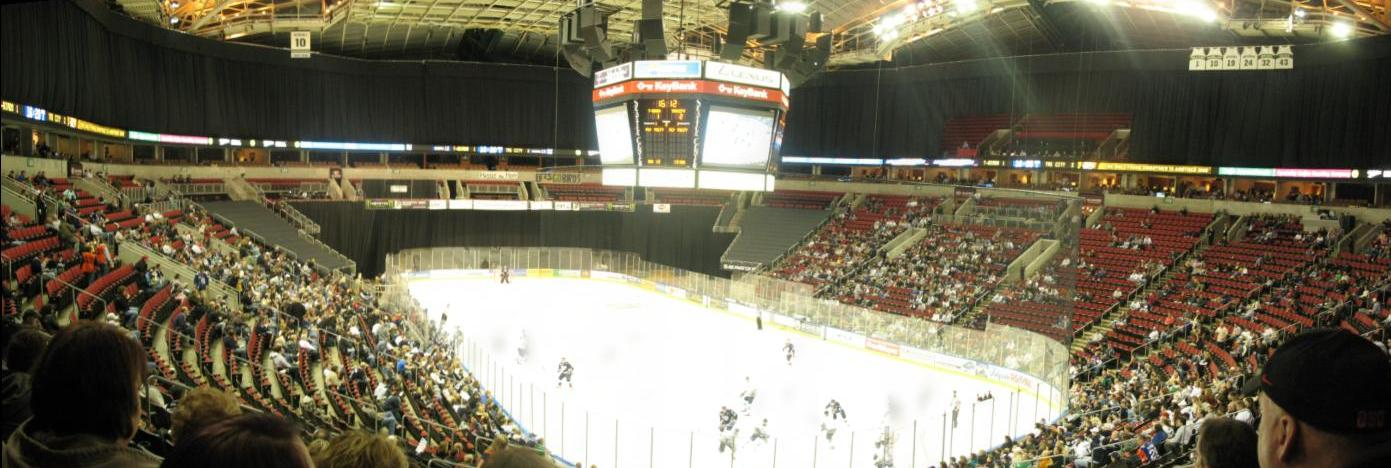
KeyArena's former ice hockey seating configuration

The remodeled arena maintained the architectural integrity of the original roofline by using the existing steel trusses in combination with four new main diagonal trusses. The wood, steel and concrete from the demolition was either reused in construction of the new arena or sold to recyclers. The original acoustical panels, the panels attached to the roof that keep the space from echoing, were refurbished and reused. The court was lowered 35 feet (11 m) below street level to allow for 3,000 more seats. The doors opened to the newly renovated arena on October 26, 1995. The sightlines, however, benefitted the SuperSonics at the expense of the junior Thunderbirds. The floor was just barely large enough to fit a regulation ice rink. Many seats in the lower level were so badly obstructed that almost half the lower level was curtained off for T-Birds games. The new scoreboard was significantly off-center in the ice hockey configuration, hanging over one blue line instead of the center-ice faceoff circle.

The first regular season game for the SuperSonics at the rechristened KeyArena was played on November 4, 1995, against the Los Angeles Lakers. The renovated arena hosted the 1996 NBA Finals in its first season, when the SuperSonics lost to the Chicago Bulls in six games.

==== SuperSonics relocation controversy ====
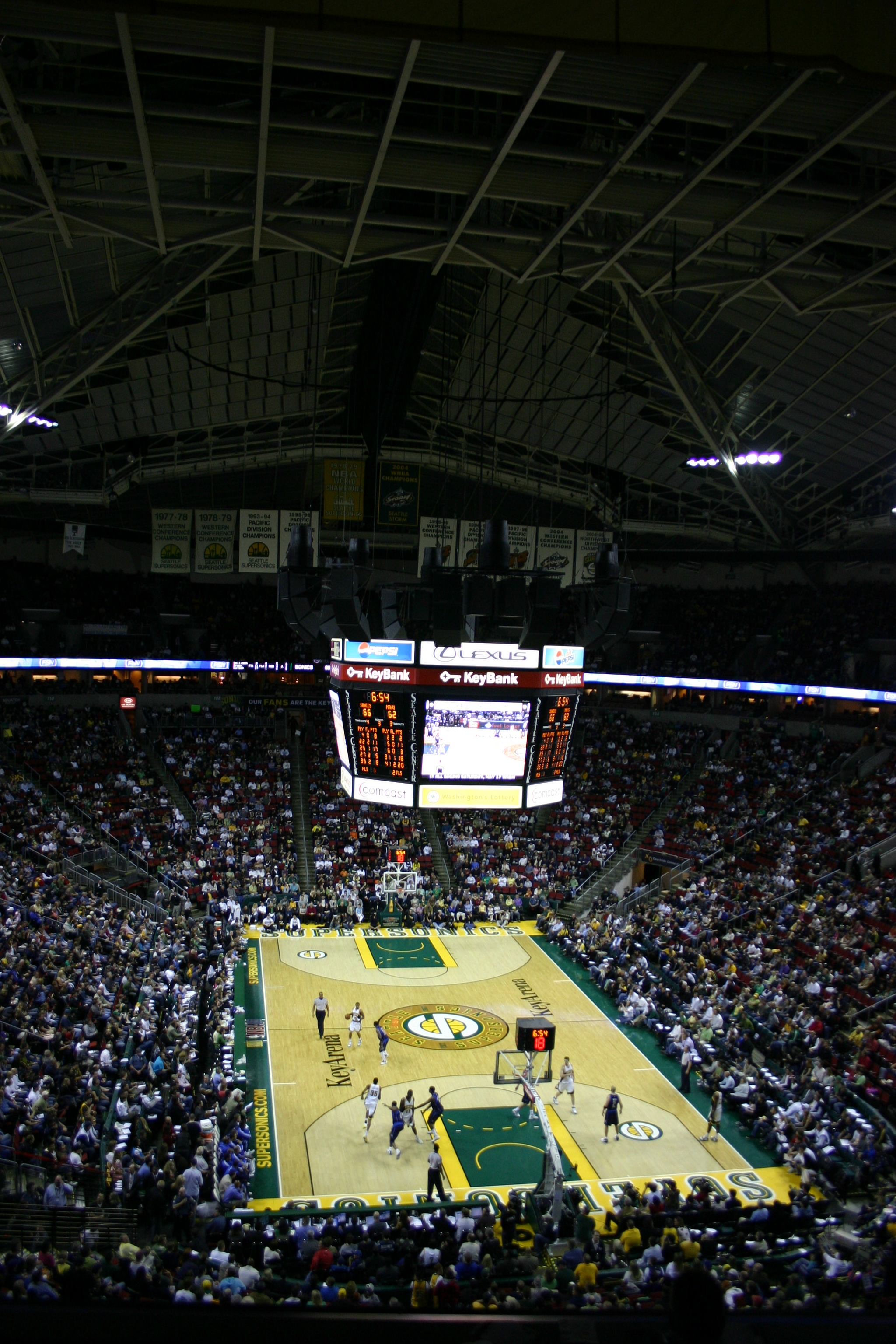
Last Sonics game in 2008

In 2001, ownership of the Seattle SuperSonics (who had called KeyArena home on-and-off since their establishment in 1967) transferred from Barry Ackerley to Starbucks CEO Howard Schultz. Schultz claimed that in the five years he owned the SuperSonics, the team suffered heavy financial losses, which led him to seek funding from the Washington State Legislature for a newer, more modern arena. After failing to reach an agreement with the city of Seattle over a publicly funded $220 million expansion of KeyArena, the Basketball Club of Seattle, led by Schultz, put the SuperSonics and its sister team, the WNBA's Seattle Storm up for sale. After failing to find a local ownership group to sell the team to, Schultz talked to ownership groups from Kansas City, St. Louis, Las Vegas, San Jose and Anaheim before agreeing to sell the team on July 18, 2006 to an ownership group from Oklahoma City, who was pursuing an NBA franchise after hosting the New Orleans Hornets franchise successfully for two seasons as the city of New Orleans rebuilt from Hurricane Katrina. The sale to Clay Bennett's ownership group, Professional Basketball Club LLC (PBC) for $350 million was approved by NBA owners on October 24, 2006. Terms of the sale required the new ownership group to "use good faith best efforts" for a term of 12 months in securing a new arena lease or venue in the Seattle metropolitan area.

In 2006, 74% of voters in Seattle voted to pass Initiative 91, a measure that prohibited use of tax dollars on arena projects in the city unless it could be shown the city would turn a profit on their investment. The limitation of tax dollars that could be spent on the arena, combined with earlier losses under recent ownership groups, "likely doomed the Sonics' future in the city".

On February 12, 2007, Bennett proposed using tax money to pay for a new $500 million arena in Renton, a suburb of Seattle. After failing to reach a deal by the end of the legislative session, Bennett gave up his attempt in April 2007. On November 2, 2007, the team announced it would move to Oklahoma City as soon as it could get out of its KeyArena lease. Seattle's mayor, Greg Nickels, maintained a stance that the Sonics were expected to stay in Seattle until their lease expired in 2010 and said the city did not intend to make it easy for Bennett to move the team early. Over concerns the city would accept a buyout of the lease, a grassroots group filed a citywide initiative that sought to prevent the city from accepting such an offer from Bennett's group. Seattle City Council later unanimously passed an ordinance modeled after the initiative. On August 13, 2007, Aubrey McClendon, a minor partner of Bennett's ownership group, said in an interview with The Journal Record (an Oklahoma City newspaper) that the team was not purchased to keep it in Seattle but to relocate it to Oklahoma City. Bennett later denied such intentions, saying McClendon "was not speaking on behalf of the ownership group". Due to his comments, McClendon was fined $250,000 by the NBA.

On October 31, 2007, Bennett informed NBA commissioner David Stern that the ownership group intended to move the Sonics to Oklahoma City as soon as it was legally possible. The timing of the announcement, one day after the Sonics' home opener, drew critical comments from Tom Carr, Seattle's attorney, who said "Mr. Bennett's announcement today is a transparent attempt to alienate the Seattle fan base and follow through on his plan to move the team to Oklahoma City ... Making this move now continues the current ownership's insulting behavior toward the Sonics' dedicated fans and the citizens of the city." Bennett also reiterated that the team was not for sale and dismissed attempts by local groups to repurchase the team.

On September 23, 2007, the City of Seattle filed a lawsuit in an attempt to keep the Sonics from leaving before the end of their lease in 2010. In the midst of the lawsuit, Microsoft CEO Steve Ballmer offered to pay half of a $300 million renovation of KeyArena; the rest to be provided by the city and county. However, when the state legislature did not give approval for the county to provide funds by an April 10 deadline, Seattle Mayor Greg Nickels said that the effort had failed and the city's hopes rested in its lawsuit.

The last SuperSonics game played at KeyArena was on April 13, 2008, a 99–95 win over the Dallas Mavericks. The NBA Board of Governors approved the relocation of the Sonics five days later. On June 16, 2008, the grassroots organization "Save Our Sonics" organized a well-publicized rally, which reportedly drew over 3,000 participants, at the U.S. District Courthouse in Seattle to protest the proposed relocation of the team. The rally was held on the first day of the city of Seattle's lawsuit against the PBC to enforce the remaining two years on the KeyArena lease.

On July 2, 2008, two hours before a ruling in the city's lawsuit was to be given, it was announced that the team and the city had reached a settlement where PBC would pay the city $45 million immediately in exchange for breaking the lease, and an additional $30 million if Seattle was not given a replacement team in five years. According to the conditions of the settlement, the Sonics' name and colors could not be used by the team in Oklahoma City, but could be taken by a future team in Seattle, although no promises for a replacement team were given. The newly renamed Oklahoma City Thunder would retain the franchise history of the SuperSonics, which could be "shared" with any future NBA team in Seattle. The team moved to Oklahoma City immediately and announced it would begin play in the 2008–09 season.

==== KeyArena after the Sonics ====
Once KeyArena lost the SuperSonics and the Thunderbirds, who moved in 2008 as well, to nearby Kent, there was speculation that KeyBank may try to amend the naming rights deal. In March 2009, the city and KeyCorp signed a new deal for a two-year term ending December 31, 2010, at an annual fee of $300,000.

In 2009, the Seattle University Redhawks men's basketball team began playing their home games at KeyArena for the first time since 1980. In February 2009, the Seattle City Council approved a new 10-year lease that would keep the WNBA's Storm at KeyArena. That year, the arena hosted the WWE No Way Out pay-per-view event. WWE returned on March 9, 2010, to tape the March 9 episode of NXT and March 12 episode of SmackDown. They would return a year later to host the WWE Over the Limit pay-per-view on May 22, 2011.

On January 21, 2011, Seattle Center announced that KeyCorp would not renew its agreement for naming rights of KeyArena, after 15 years of sponsorship. However, the venue retained the KeyArena name until its redevelopment, despite the fact that the naming right had expired. In April 2011, the Professional Bull Riders brought the Built Ford Tough Series to KeyArena for the first time. Between June 28 and 30, the arena hosted the Seattle audition stages in the first season of the Fox singer search program The X Factor.

In January 2012, ESPN.com reporter Scott Burnside said KeyArena "would be entirely acceptable", as a temporary venue for an NHL franchise, depending on a future arena plan. The Phoenix Coyotes were often speculated to be a likely candidate for relocation and in June 2013, reports circulated that if the NHL could not negotiate a new lease for the Coyotes with the city of Glendale, Arizona, by July 2, the league would sell the team to a private investment group which would then be given permission to relocate the team to Seattle prior to the 2013–2014 season and use KeyArena as a temporary home. On July 2, the city of Glendale, Arizona approved a new lease for the Coyotes at Jobing.com Arena, and soon after, the NHL approved the sale of the Coyotes to an investment group that would keep the Coyotes in the Phoenix area, eliminating the possibility that the Coyotes could move to Seattle.

Conversely, in February 2012, SB Nation columnist Travis Hughes said that while it made "too much sense" for the NHL not to put a team in Seattle in the future, KeyArena was completely unsuitable even as a temporary facility due to the same problems with sight lines that ultimately forced the Thunderbirds to move out. Hughes wrote that even one year of NHL hockey in an arena where half the lower bowl sat unused would be "just unacceptable." He argued that the situation would be even worse than what the Coyotes faced at America West Arena, their original home in Phoenix. When the Coyotes played there from 1996 to 2003, they had to deal with seats where part of the ice could not be seen at all, forcing them to curtain off several thousand seats in the upper level.

League officials later hinted that a new arena would have to be in place before a new or relocated NHL team came to Seattle. During the 2012 All-Star Weekend, Bettman said that while Seattle was a good fit for the NHL, "there's no building." Deputy Commissioner Bill Daly said that KeyArena would be "a difficult arena for hockey" due to the large number of obstructed-view seats.

In February 2012, KING 5 reporter Chris Daniels said an NBA team could also use KeyArena as a temporary home. In July 2012, at a public town hall meeting debating Chris Hansen's proposed NBA/NHL arena in downtown Seattle, anti-arena proponents wanted to "re-explore" using KeyArena instead of the proposed site downtown.

From 2014 to 2017, American video game developer Valve hosted The International, the world championship for Dota 2 eSports, at the venue, which featured prize pools of over $20 million in 2016 and 2017. TI returned to the venue in 2023.

On September 16, 2016, the arena hosted the Kellogg's Tour of Gymnastics Champions.

Roger Federer organized a tennis exhibition match at KeyArena with Match for Africa 4, held on April 29, 2017. Two matches were played, the first a doubles match pitting Roger Federer and Bill Gates against John Isner and Mike McCready of Pearl Jam, and a singles match featuring Federer and Isner. More than $2 million was raised for the Roger Federer Foundation from the match's proceeds.

On October 5, 2018, the Golden State Warriors played against the Sacramento Kings in a preseason game at KeyArena, the same arena where Kevin Durant played previously with the Sonics. The game was mostly played to celebrate its moments with the NBA and ended up being its final event as the KeyArena before the arena closed down for redevelopment.

=== Redevelopment into Climate Pledge Arena, arrival of the Kraken ===
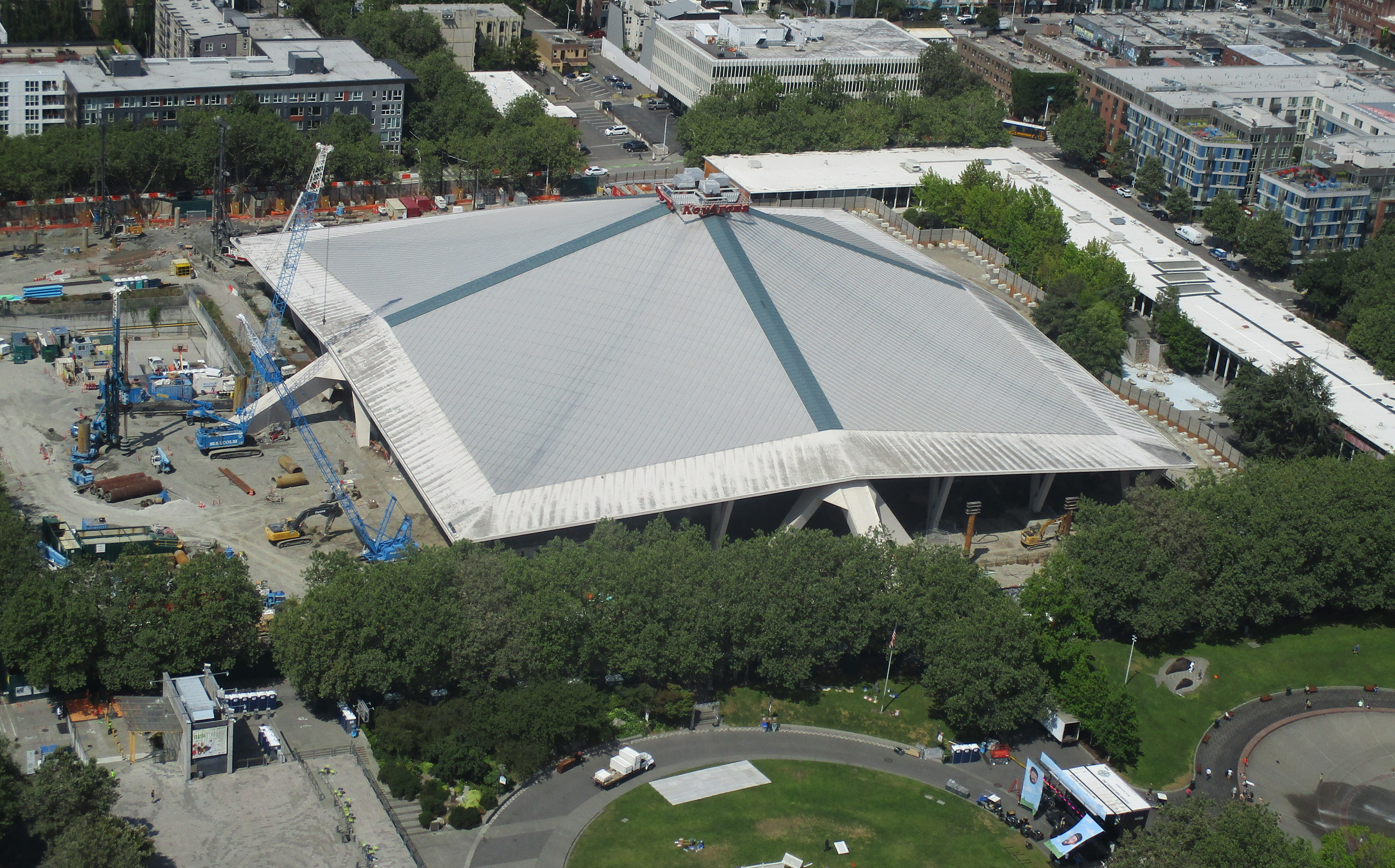
Arena under renovation in August 2019

In October 2016, Seattle Mayor Ed Murray announced that the city would seek proposals to redevelop KeyArena into an NBA and NHL ready venue, issuing a full request for proposal in January. This came after the rejection of the new arena proposed in SoDo by Seattle City Council over the street vacation of Occidental Avenue.

Two groups, Seattle Partners (led by Anschutz Entertainment Group (AEG) and Hudson Pacific Properties) and the Oak View Group (led by former AEG CEO Tim Leiweke), submitted proposals to the city in April 2017 to redevelop the arena, also securing corporate partnerships and seeking the support of the NHL. Both groups were required to submit an additional proposal to preserve the arena's roof, which the city planned to submit for municipal landmark status. AEG unveiled a $520 million proposal that would extend the roofline over presently underutilized space on the arena's south end. Oak View Group submitted a $564 million proposal that would lower the arena's bowl 15 feet (4.6 m) within the existing roof structure. On June 7, 2017, the city selected OVG as the preferred bidder for the redevelopment. The landmark status of the arena's exterior, including the roof, was approved by a city-appointed landmarks preservation board on August 2, 2017; the exterior was subsequently listed on the Washington Heritage Register on March 8, 2018, and on the National Register of Historic Places on May 10.

On December 4, 2017, the city council approved a memorandum of understanding with OVG to rebuild the arena by 2020. The approval came days after the previous memorandum with the SODO Arena had expired. Four days after the approval of the MOU, the NHL gave the Oak View Group approval to submit an application for an expansion franchise in Seattle. The arena would be closed for two years, and the last remaining professional sports team tenant, the WNBA's Seattle Storm, would plan to move elsewhere in the Seattle metropolitan area during those two years. The team played its usual summer schedule at KeyArena in 2018, beginning in mid-May and continuing through the playoffs in early September; they ultimately won the 2018 WNBA Finals. During the renovation, the Storm played most of their home games at the Alaska Airlines Arena at Hec Edmundson Pavilion on the campus of the University of Washington, with other games at Angel of the Winds Arena in Everett.

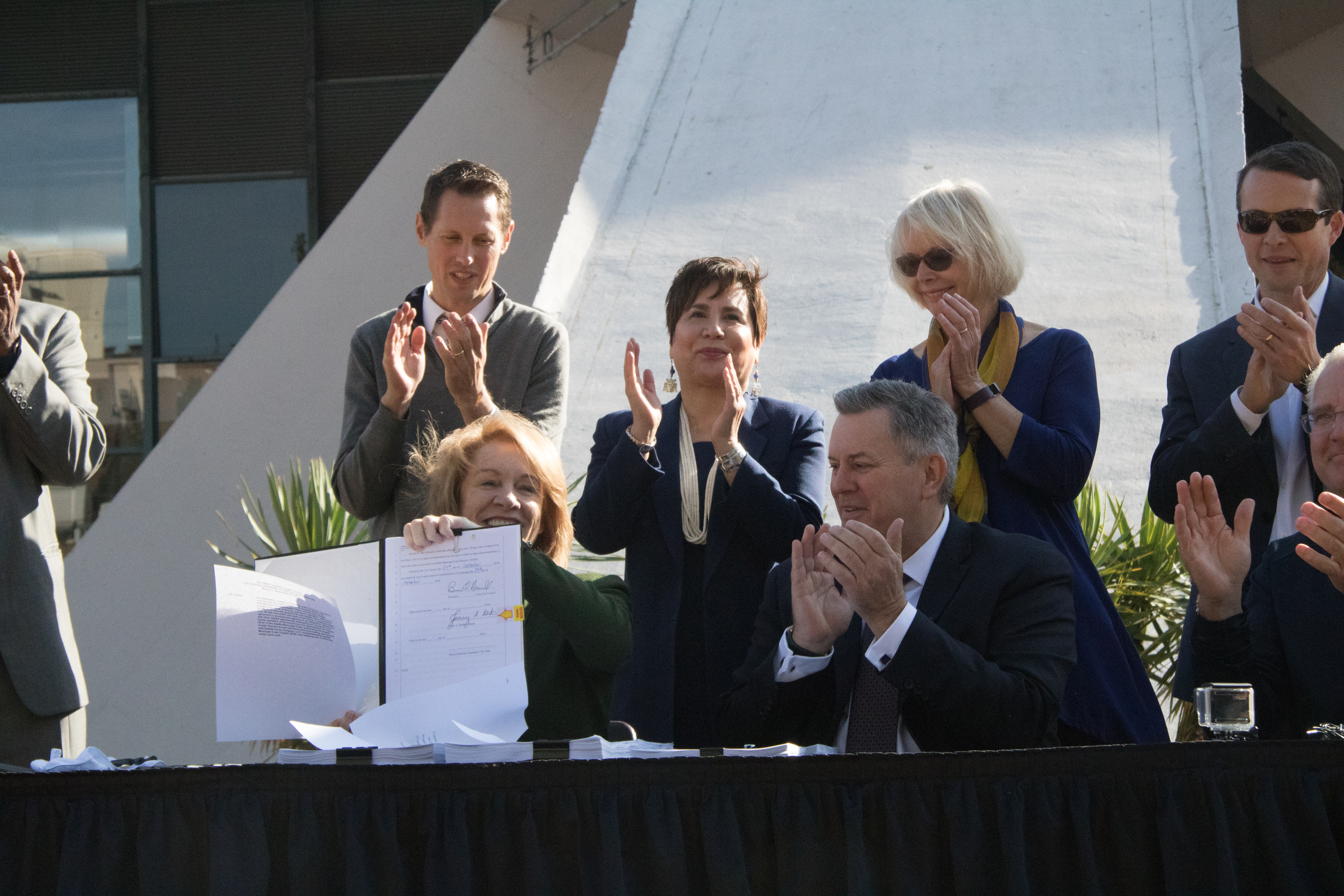
Mayor Jenny Durkan and others celebrating after she signed legislation authorizing the arena renovation

On September 25, 2018, the proposed $700 million renovation of KeyArena was approved unanimously 8–0 by the Seattle City Council and signed into legislation by mayor Jenny Durkan. The NHL Board of Governors voted to approve an expansion team for Seattle on December 4, 2018. Redevelopment commenced the next day on December 5. In mid-December 2018, OVG announced that overall project costs had increased to between $825 and $850 million. Although some design changes and additions had contributed to the increase in cost, OVG replaced the general contractor, Skanska Hunt, with Mortenson Construction.

With the closing of the arena in October 2018 to begin redevelopment, the City of Seattle, Seattle Center, and Oak View Group retired the KeyArena name and officially adopted Seattle Center Arena as the name for the project. It was alternately referred to as the New Arena at Seattle Center. In February 2018, it was reported that six interested parties had approached OVG regarding naming rights for the new arena. Alaska Airlines was announced as the naming sponsor of the south atrium in January 2020. On June 25, 2020, Amazon purchased the naming rights; the arena would be branded as Climate Pledge Arena to promote Amazon's partnership with the environmental advocacy group Global Optimism and its "Climate Pledge", under which companies sign up to make their operations carbon neutral by 2040. The renovated arena received carbon-neutral certification, uses rainwater for its hockey ice, and aims to source 75% of food locally, divert 95% of waste from landfills, donate unused food, and switched from plastic to compostable containers.

The rooftop signage for KeyArena was removed by a helicopter on July 8, 2020. The replacement signage was installed on December 5, 2020. During redevelopment, the arena's existing roof was "detached from 20 original concrete Y-columns and four gigantic buttresses that previously supported it", being held up by "72 temporary steel columns, cross-beams and a steel reinforcement structure called a kickstand.” During the excavation of the arena bowl, 600,000 cubic yards of dirt were removed, and the structure was then built upwards to connect with the roof.

Climate Pledge Arena was opened to the public on October 19, 2021, by a Foo Fighters and Death Cab for Cutie concert for local charities. The first scheduled event, a sold-out Coldplay concert, took place three days later on the 22nd. The first sports event at the renovated arena, a Seattle Kraken regular season game, took place on October 23 against the Vancouver Canucks. Kraken defenseman Vince Dunn scored the first NHL goal in the arena and the game ended in a 4–2 Kraken loss to the Canucks. The first Kraken win at the arena was on October 26, a 5–1 victory against the Montreal Canadiens.

On May 6, 2022, the Seattle Storm played their first game at the redeveloped arena against the Minnesota Lynx, winning 97–74. On October 23, 2023, Climate Pledge Arena hosted the Coachella Valley Firebirds, the American Hockey League affiliate of the Kraken, as part of four of their Seattle arena games while waiting for the construction of their arena.

On January 5, 2025, the first Professional Women's Hockey League (PWHL) game in Seattle was played at the arena between the Montreal Victoire and the Boston Fleet. Boston won 3–2 with 12,608 spectators in attendance. The PWHL awarded an expansion team named the Seattle Torrent, for the 2025–26 season. The Torrent played their first regular season game in the arena on November 28, 2025, in a 3–0 loss to the Minnesota Frost. The game set a record for the highest-attended women's hockey game in the United States, with 16,014 fans at the game.

== Sporting events ==
=== Mixed martial arts ===
The arena has held several UFC events throughout its history, beginning with UFC Fight Night: Nogueira vs. Davis on March 26, 2011. The promotion returned to the arena on December 8, 2012, for UFC on Fox: Henderson vs. Diaz. The UFC returned on July 27, 2013, for UFC on Fox: Johnson vs. Moraga. The UFC returned to the arena after twelve years on February 22, 2025, for UFC Fight Night: Cejudo vs. Song. The promotion returned to the arena on March 28, 2026 for UFC Fight Night: Adesanya vs. Pyfer.

== Concerts ==
The Beatles performed at the arena twice, first on August 21, 1964. Also 2 concerts on August 25, 1966.

Metallica filmed the first of three live videos for their 1993 live concert box set Live Shit: Binge & Purge at the arena. The band recorded their performances from August 29 and August 30, 1989, during their Damaged Justice tour, widely considered one of the band's greatest live performances by fans.

On April 24 and April 25, 2005, U2 performed at KeyArena as part of their Vertigo Tour. Kings of Leon was the opening act.

Destiny's Child performed at the arena on September 9, 2005, during their Destiny Fulfilled... and Lovin' It farewell tour. The show was the group's second-to-last performance before they officially split up.

In 2012, Madonna performed two sold-out concerts at the venue as a part of The MDNA Tour. The shows drew 23,651 attendees and grossed $3.7 million.

In December 2013, Macklemore and Ryan Lewis became the first Seattle-based act ever to play three consecutive shows at KeyArena when the duo concluded their 2013 World Tour in support of their album The Heist.

In August 2014, Lady Gaga performed at KeyArena as part of her artRAVE: The ARTPOP Ball. Lady Starlight was the opening act.

Bruce Springsteen has performed at the arena five times. He and the E Street Band performed a nearly four-hour long concert during The River Tour 2016 on March 24, 2016. It included a guest appearance by Eddie Vedder. Springsteen returned to the newly renovated arena for a single performance on February 27, 2023, as part of his 2023 Tour.

Foo Fighters and Death Cab for Cutie performed at the first event in Climate Pledge Arena after its renovation on October 19, 2021.

Korean boy group Stray Kids performed on July 14 & 15, 2022 as part of their North American arena tour for Maniac World Tour.

Dua Lipa concluded the US leg of her Radical Optimism Tour with two shows on October 15 & 16, 2025, including special guest appearances from Brandi Carlile and Ben Gibbard of Death Cab for Cutie.

K-Pop girl group TWICE performed on January 13-14, 2026 as part of their North American leg tour for This Is For World Tour.

== Seating capacity ==
Seating configurations

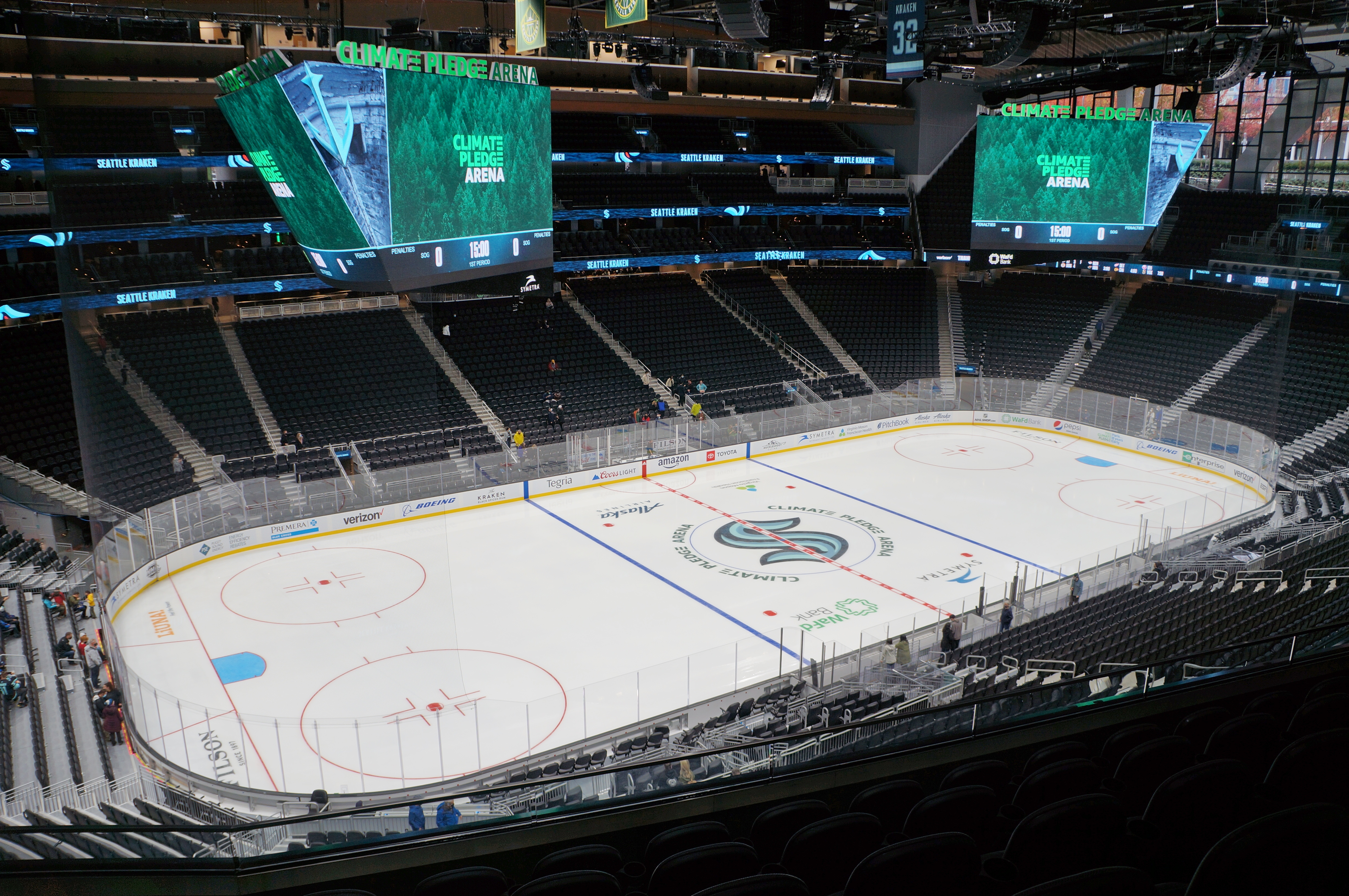
In hockey configuration for the Seattle Kraken

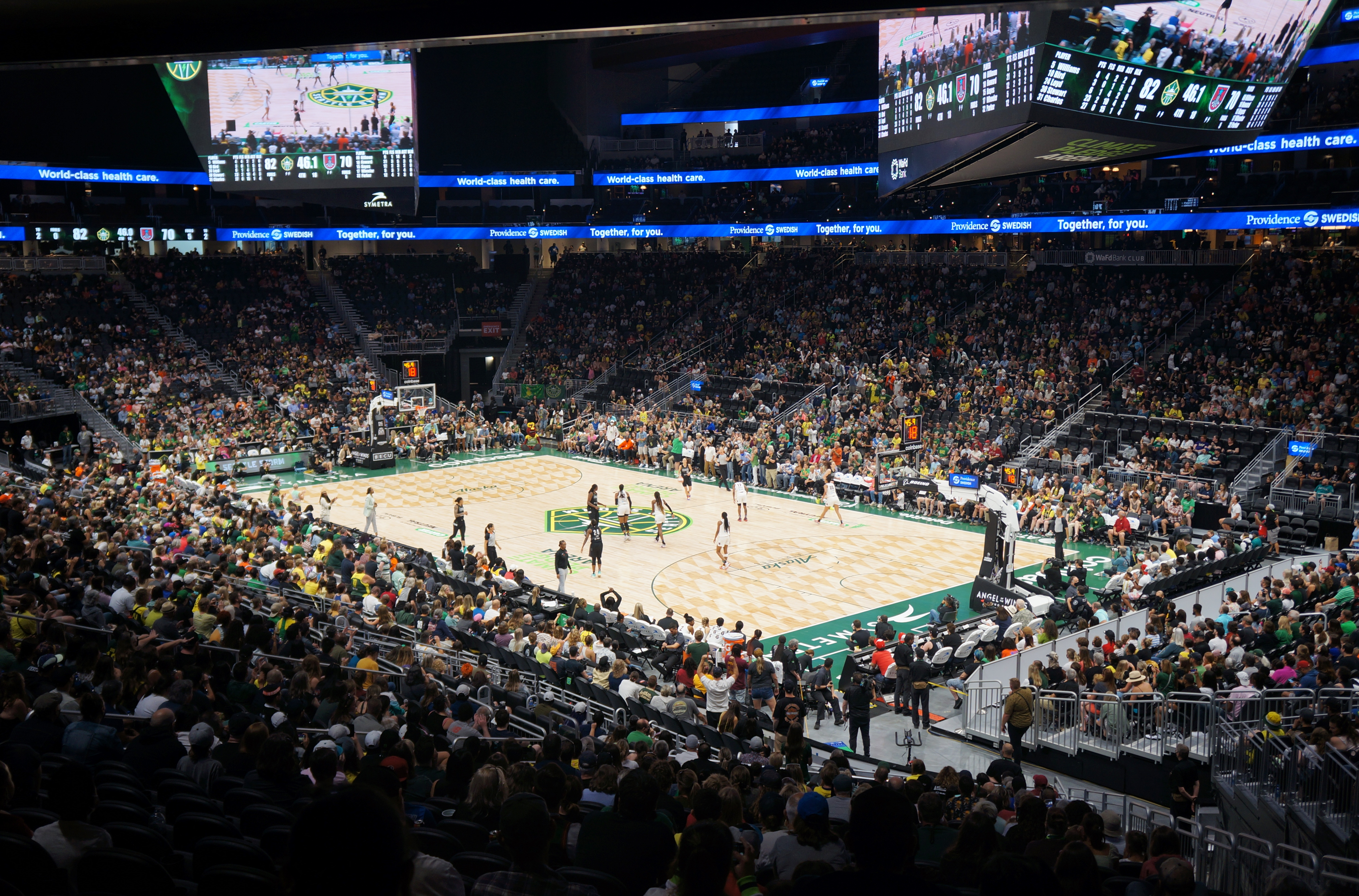
View during a Seattle Storm game in 2022

In its initial configuration, the arena had a seating capacity of 13,200 for basketball games, 12,250 for ice hockey games, 16,000 for meetings, and 14,770 for boxing matches. Minor expansion occurred as the SuperSonics grew in popularity, but the design of the arena limited its expansion potential; calls for its renovation occurred as early as 1976.

In 1977, Seattle voters passed a bond measure to make improvements to Seattle Center. Permanent ticketing areas were added to the arena eliminating the portable ticket booths that were in use since The Seattle World's Fair. In 1983, the original seats were replaced while improvements were made to the concourses to compete for concerts after the Tacoma Dome opened.

With the 1995 renovation, the arena's capacity was expanded to 17,072 for basketball, 15,177 for ice hockey and ice shows, 16,641 for end-stage concerts, and 17,459 for center-stage concerts and boxing. Risers held 7,440 on the upper level and up to 7,741 on the lower level, with luxury suites adding another 1,160 seats. However, the ice hockey capacity was reduced to 10,442 when obstructed seats were removed.

The redeveloped arena features a new interior and entrance atrium while retaining the existing roof and three exterior walls. It seats 18,300 for basketball, 17,151 for ice hockey (as well as arena football, box lacrosse, indoor soccer, and ice shows), and 17,200 for concerts. The arena's record attendance for basketball—18,343 spectators—was set on May 22, 2024, by the Seattle Storm against the Indiana Fever.

The seating capacity for basketball and ice hockey are as follows:

Basketball
Years	Capacity
1964–1973	13,200
1973–1974	14,078
1974–1975	14,082
1975–1976	14,096
1976–1985	14,098
1985–1986	14,230
1986–1994	14,252
1995–2014	17,072
2014–2018	15,354
2021–present	18,300

Ice hockey
Years	Capacity
1964–1974	12,250
1974–1994	12,700
1995–2008	15,177
2021–present	17,151

== Features and amenities ==
The post-renovation Climate Pledge Arena is 740,000 square feet (69,000 m^{2}) and has 17,100 seats in its ice hockey configuration, with higher capacities for other events. Most of the lower-level seats are subterranean, while the concourse and main south entrance at the Alaska Airlines Atrium are near ground level. The arena has several food vendors that use Amazon One for contactless payments.

The arena has a pair of six-sided ceiling scoreboards in lieu of the traditional single, center-hung scoreboard used in other indoor arenas. They were designed to not interfere with sightlines and are also positioned higher than other NHL scoreboards.

Concurrent with the announcement that the arena would be named Climate Pledge Arena, it was stated that the venue would aim to receive a net-zero certification by pledging to have all events be "zero-waste" (through use of compostable containers and reduction of single-use plastic), use captured rainwater for its ice surface, and source at least 75% of food served at the arena from local producers. All fans holding a ticket to a public event at the arena can claim a free public transit pass for use starting two hours before the doors open and until two hours after the end of the event. In the first year that the passes were available to Kraken and Storm ticketholders, 25% of fans used public transit.

== Transportation ==
Climate Pledge Arena is located in the Lower Queen Anne neighborhood, which is served by King County Metro bus service from surrounding areas, including Queen Anne Hill and Downtown Seattle. The RapidRide D Line and other routes provide frequent service between the arena's west side and Downtown Seattle. Route 8 connects the neighborhood to Capitol Hill and the Central District.

The Seattle Center Monorail also serves the arena, connecting it to Westlake Center and the Westlake light rail station in downtown, and runs higher frequency service during events.

Climate Pledge Arena is served by three public parking garages, with a total capacity of 2,944 vehicles, located in and around the Seattle Center. Additional neighborhood parking lots and on-street parking spaces bring the total number of spaces up to 7,400 stalls. The arena is located near the Mercer Street exit on Interstate 5, as well as State Route 99.

Link light rail service to the Seattle Center and Climate Pledge Arena is planned to begin in 2035, as part of the Ballard–Downtown extension.

== See also ==
- List of NCAA Division I basketball arenas

Events and tenants
Preceded by first arena	Home of the Seattle Kraken; 2021–present	Succeeded by current
Preceded by first arena Alaska Airlines Arena / Angel of the Winds Arena	Home of the Seattle Storm; 2000–2018; 2022–present	Succeeded by Alaska Airlines Arena / Angel of the Winds Arena current
Preceded by first arena The Kingdome; Tacoma Dome	Home of the Seattle SuperSonics; 1967–1978; 1985–1994; 1995–2008	Succeeded by The Kingdome; Tacoma Dome; Paycom Center (as Oklahoma City Thunder)
Preceded by Kamloops Memorial Arena	Home of the Seattle Thunderbirds; 1977–1994 (with Mercer Arena); 1995–2008	Succeeded by ShoWare Center
Preceded by first arena	Home of the Seattle SeaDogs; 1995–1997	Succeeded by last arena
Preceded by Chicago Stadium	Host of the NBA All-Star Game; 1974	Succeeded by Veterans Memorial Coliseum
