= Molomo =

Molomo is a surname. Notable people with the surname include:

- John Olu-Molomo (born 1968), American soccer player
- Margaret Ghogha Molomo, South African environmental activist
- Matlapeng Ray Molomo (1930–2019), Botswana politician
- Zoey Molomo (born 2008), American artistic gymnast
