= Barry Ackerley =

American businessman (1934–2011)

- Born: Barry Allan Ackerley; April 15, 1934; Des Moines, Iowa, U.S.
- Died: March 21, 2011 (aged 76); Rancho Mirage, California, U.S.
- Education: University of Iowa
- Occupations: Businessman and sports franchise owner
- Known for: Owner of the Seattle SuperSonics

Barry Allan Ackerley (April 15, 1934 – March 21, 2011) was an American businessman. He was the former chairman and CEO of the Ackerley Group media company. He was also the owner of the Seattle SuperSonics basketball franchise from 1983 to 2001 and the Seattle Storm basketball franchise from 2000 to 2001.

== Biography ==
Born in Des Moines, Iowa, in 1934, Ackerley began his career in the advertising industry selling space for the magazine Better Homes & Gardens. In 1964, he approached a wealthy family in Wichita, Kansas, and asked for their financial assistance in acquiring billboards. The family agreed and, as a minority shareholder in the venture, Ackerley purchased billboards in Fresno and Bakersfield, California. Over the next four years, Ackerley purchased additional billboards in San Francisco, Oakland, and San Jose, California.

By 1968, the billboards in northern California had generated enough income to provide Ackerley with the start-up capital he had lacked in New York five years earlier. He sold his interest in the venture back to his benefactors and, with a new partner, parlayed the proceeds toward the establishment of an outdoor advertising company, Golden West Outdoor Advertising. Golden West, had billboards in Sacramento, California, and Colorado until 1974, when Ackerley purchased his partner's share in the company and then sold the company to Gannett Company.

With the money garnered from the sale to Gannett, Ackerley, after a brief return to the Northeast to work for an advertising firm, relocated to Seattle, Washington, in 1975 and purchased Seattle-based Foster & Kleiser from Metromedia Inc. and Obie Outdoor Advertising based in Eugene, Oregon. The acquisition of these two outdoor advertising companies formed the beginnings of Ackerley's new company, named Northwest Communications, Inc. in 1975 initially, and renamed Ackerley Communications, Inc. the following year. From there the new company would begin to acquire broadcast television stations and radio stations in the early 1980s. After mainly transitioning to a broadcast media company, the company would be sold to Clear Channel Communications in 2001 for $1.1 billion.

=== Seattle SuperSonics ===
In 1983 Ackerley purchased the Seattle SuperSonics of the National Basketball Association from original owner Sam Schulman. Ackerley began exploring new options for an arena. Heavy relocation rumors began to circulate, amongst them a potential move to San Diego or possible sales to groups in other markets like Milwaukee or Toronto. In 2018, Ackerley's son Chris would say that the family was always committed to keeping the team in Seattle, and that "in each case, we stood on our principles that this is a Seattle community asset."

Briefly, the Ackerleys talked about building an arena east of Lake Washington near the mall in Bellevue. They would eventually purchase land in the SoDo District near the Kingdome, some of which included the site that would become the Mariners' current home, T-Mobile Park. Ackerley approached the city about a public contribution to the new arena, but the city was reluctant over fears the city-owned Coliseum would become obsolete. They offered to help finance a renovation of the Coliseum, but the team owner declined. To sweeten the offer, Ackerley sold city leaders on the idea that the new arena in SoDo could also attract an NHL club. The city, along with Denver, had been conditionally granted an expansion NHL franchise in 1974 to begin play in the 1976–77 season. The NHL briefly flirted with relocating the Pittsburgh Penguins to Seattle (and the California Golden Seals to Denver) to address a troubled market and fill the expansion commitment, but ultimately kept the team there. Eventually, the Seattle franchise award was rescinded altogether when the potential ownership group was unable to secure the funds for the expansion fee.

In July 1990, the city council approved a deal for a privately owned $100 million facility to be built on the Ackerley land in SoDo, despite objections over traffic and parking by the Seahawks and Mariners in the neighboring Kingdome. The city's contribution would be to waive about $31 million in tax revenues (about $1 million per year) to potentially be collected on admissions fees at the new arena. It would also pay $2 million for street improvements around the proposed site, including a pedestrian walkway over South Royal Brougham Way. Ackerley also agreed to sign a 30-year lease for the Sonics and to build a 1,800-stall parking garage. Ackerley appeased the Seahawks' concerns, noting the arena would be empty during any NFL games. The Mariners unsuccessfully continued to object, even enlisting then-Major League Baseball commissioner Fay Vincent and then-American League president Bobby Brown to speak before the council ahead of their final vote.

During negotiations, Ackerley had asked for a provision to reduce the seating at the Coliseum by 9,000 seats so the older arena couldn't compete with the new building, but the city would not agree. Another selling point of the new arena was luxury suites, a means to attract corporate money and sponsorship that was then an emerging new revenue stream for sports team owners. Ackerley's financing and agreement with the city hinged on the ability to sell the 70 proposed luxury suites.

Ackerley also committed to submitting an expansion application to the NHL by a September 15, 1990 deadline as part of the arena deal. His son Bill would head the expansion effort, while a competing group led by Microsoft executive Chris Larson and former Seattle Totems player then coach Bill MacFarland was preparing their own application. With the Ackerley application already submitted, the two groups would merge with Larson and MacFarland being primary points of contact with the NHL. Then the owner of the Seattle Thunderbirds, Bill Yuill, also joined the group. Larson and MacFarland, along with Barry Ackerley and Bill Lear, Ackerley's financial advisor, were set to make a presentation to the NHL's board of governors on December 5, 1990. At the meeting, Ackerley and Lear asked to meet with the board first, promptly withdrew their application, and left. Larson and MacFarland were stunned to learn of the development but were unable to pursue any recourse as their names were never on the submitted application.

Thought to play a factor in Ackerley's decision were the significant demands by the NHL for an expansion team: a $50 million expansion fee that was more than any NHL club was valued at the time; a $5 million down payment that would be forfeited if 10,000 season tickets weren't sold in the first year – the Sonics had never sold more than 9,000 season tickets; season tickets needed to produce at least $9 million annually, which would've made the tickets the second most expensive for a team in the area at the time; a 20-year lease with a "substantial" share of arena revenues from concessions, parking, and ad signage; priority status for postseason arena dates; and a secured $5 million line of credit in case the league had to take over ownership of the team at any point. Ackerley would not sacrifice Sonics revenues for a hockey team in which he would be a minority investor. Seattle would eventually get an NHL team in 2018 when the Seattle Kraken were approved to begin play in 2021.

In June 1991, nearly a year after the city agreed to the arena deal, Ackerley announced that the project would not move forward. Increasing project costs, legal disputes, and inability to secure construction financing were cited as reasons to drop the project. Only around 30 of the 70 luxury suites were sold and the Ackerleys were unable to find a corporate buyer for naming rights. Ackerley Communications profits were down, which also contributed to the financing difficulties. A state Supreme Court case brought by Seattle Center employees challenged the constitutionality of the arena deal, while potential lawsuits from the Mariners and trade show organizers and possible legal challenges to environmental review of the project loomed. Seattle Center Arena was extensively remodeled in 1995 for the Sonics. In 2000, Ackerley and his wife Ginger launched the Seattle Storm of the WNBA. Both the SuperSonics and Storm were sold in 2001 to Howard Schultz.

=== Personal life and death ===
Ackerley died on March 21, 2011, two days after suffering a stroke. Ackerly had two daughters, Elizabeth Allyn Ackerly Daiber and Julia Allyson Ackerly, from a previous relationship with Jean Mortenson.

Contrary to Adam Sandler's implication in "The Chanukah Song," Ackerley was not Jewish. Ackerley had unsuccessfully tried to convince Sandler to "86" the song because of Sandler's line "the owner of the Seattle SuperSonic-ahs" (Ackerley at the time) "celebrates Hanukkah." Sandler was unwilling to argue about the lyric, but Rob Schneider, who was present at the confrontation, did. (Schulman and Gene Klein, from whom Ackerley had bought the team, were indeed Jewish.)

Sporting positions
Preceded by Sam Schulman	Seattle SuperSonics principal owner 1983–2001	Succeeded by Howard Schultz
New creation	Seattle Storm principal owner 2000–2001	Succeeded by Howard Schultz
