= Sam Schulman =

American film producer

Owner of the Seattle SuperSonics
- In office 1967–1983
- Preceded by: Position established
- Succeeded by: Barry Ackerley

Minority owner of the San Diego Chargers
- In office 1966–1983 Serving with Gene Klein
- Preceded by: Barron Hilton
- Succeeded by: Alex Spanos

Personal details
- Born: April 10, 1910 New York City, U.S.
- Died: June 12, 2003 (aged 93) Century City, California, U.S.
- Education: B.S. New York University 1932; M.S. Harvard Business School, 1934
- Occupation: Businessman; Entrepreneur; Sports franchise owner
- Known for: Owner of the Seattle SuperSonics (NBA); Minority owning partner, San Diego Chargers (AFL/NFL)

Samuel Schulman (April 10, 1910 – June 12, 2003) was an American businessman from New York who was a founding owner and President of the Seattle SuperSonics of the National Basketball Association and an owner of the San Diego Chargers of the American Football League, and later the National Football League.

== Life and career ==
Born to a Jewish family on April 10, 1910, in New York City, Schulman graduated from New York University with a Bachelor of Science degree in 1932. He earned a master's degree from Harvard Business School in 1934. A year later, he took over George McKibben & Son, a bankrupt Brooklyn bookbinding manufacturer, which he turned into a profitable business.

Schulman was a successful Los Angeles businessman involved in the motion picture industry. Although his company was the backer of a number of films, he was rarely listed in any film credits with the exception of a few, the most notable of which was as executive producer of the 1985 production, To Live and Die in L.A..

Following the June 1966 announcement of the merger of the American Football League and the National Football League, on August 25 Sam Schulman and fellow Los Angeles businessman Eugene V. Klein headed a group of minority partners who purchased the San Diego Chargers for $10 million, at the time, a record price for an NFL franchise. Klein served as the football team's president, and on December 20, 1966, Schulman and Klein led another group of minority investors who were awarded the NBA franchise for the city of Seattle, Washington, which would become known as the Seattle SuperSonics, and began play in 1967. Schulman would be the active partner, serving as president of the team and head of operations. He ran the team until 1983, when he sold the franchise to Seattle media and entertainment company executive Barry Ackerley.

One of the first big names Schulman brought to the SuperSonics from the American Basketball Association was Spencer Haywood, who had signed with the Denver Rockets as a college sophomore but quit the Rockets over a salary dispute. Haywood's signing with the SuperSonics in December 1970 was in defiance of the NBA rule that said a player could not be signed until four years after he graduated from high school. Schulman and his lawyer wound up taking Haywood v. National Basketball Association to the U.S. Supreme Court. That March, the court cleared the way for Haywood to finish the season with the SuperSonics. The ruling led to a revision of the NBA policy and opened the draft potential for many future young players.

Sam Schulman died from a blood disease in 2003 at the age of 93 at his home in Century City. Sam Schulman received the Pillar of Achievement award from the Southern California Jewish Hall of Fame.

Sporting positions
| Preceded by Barron Hilton | San Diego Chargers minority owner 1966–1984; Served alongside: Gene Klein | Succeeded by Alex Spanos |
| New creation | Seattle SuperSonics principal owner 1967–1983 | Succeeded by Barry Ackerley |
