= Margaret Ghogha Molomo =

South African environmental activist

- Born: Ga Kgubudi village, Mokopane, Limpopo
- Citizenship: South Africa
- Occupation: Environmental activist
- Organizations: Mining and Environmental Justice Community Network of South Africa; Kopano Formation Committee
- Website: mejcon.org.za

Margaret Ghogha Molomo is a South African environmental activist who campaigns against mining interests in defense of the right to a healthy environment. She is from Masodi village, Mokopane in the Limpopo Province of South Africa.

== Environmental activism ==
Molomo is the chairperson of the Mining and Environmental Justice Community Network of South Africa (MEJCON-SA) and coordinator of her community-based organization, the Kopano Formation Committee. MEJCON-SA is an organization which coordinates groups whose rights have been impacted by mining in the region, operating since 2012.

Molomo aided the community of Mokopane in a dispute with a platinum mining company which attempted to operate on land used by the community of Mokopane, Limpopo, without their consent. Additionally, the mine was conducting mining operations on land designated for agricultural purposes and in areas which contained some of the community's graves. Molomo and MEJCON sought to protect the community's rights by lodging legal appeals and undertaking court processes.

=== Activism during COVID-19 Pandemic ===
During the COVID-19 pandemic, while Molomo's work was made significantly more difficult due to the inability to gather to protest and the lack of communication infrastructure in rural regions of South Africa, she has worked to raise awareness of the traditional practices and responsibilities of women in Limpopo villages, many of which have also been made more difficult or impossible because of the pandemic. She has especially highlighted the concern that mining companies may take advantage of the inability of villagers to exercise their cultural rights by further encroaching on ancestral lands and traditionally important sites.

== Women's Activism ==
Molomo has been active in the advocacy for women's rights, including women's ability to cultivate food and preserve their traditions. The COVID-19 pandemic has affected African women's traditional daily survival activities, which include gathering food and water for cooking and heating during the winter season. Due to the disruption, these practices and efforts have been fragmented, as they have been unable to carry out activities such as traveling to town to sell harvests for income. Restrictions on movement have also curtailed cultural rituals such as the visiting of mountains for annual initiation rites, the collection of herbs for the rain ritual, and the visiting of graveyards, which are important to the community but especially women. Molomo's community has fought to protect heritage sites from mining in light of this challenge.

Molomo has called to attention the tremendous impact the suspension of daily survival activities has had, not only on the entire community, but particularly on the wellbeing of women. Molomo has also emphasised the burdens women face in particular from environmental impacts of non-compliant mining operations, given that women are often left to look after relatives who fall sick due to contaminated air and water. Additionally, due to mining activity, women will have to walk further distances to fetch water as nearby boreholes are dried up, and the mining dust generated by such operations leads to endless cleaning chores at home.
