= List of ESPN Radio personalities =

Here is a list of notable former and current ESPN Radio national personalities.

== Current ESPN Radio personalities ==
=== A–L ===
- Doug Brown: 1993–present (ESPN Radio SportsCenter and SportsCenter Nightly)
- Chris Canty: 2021–present (Canty & Golic Jr. 2021–22, Canty & Carlin 2022-present)
- Joe D'Ambrosio: 1996–present (MLB on ESPN Radio and ESPN Radio SportsCenter)
- Mike Greenberg: 1999–2017 (Mike and Mike); 2020–present (Greeny)
- Alan Hahn: 2021–present (Bart & Hahn)
- Matt Jones: 2020–present (Sunday NFL Countdown)
- Marc Kestecher: 1999–present (NBA on ESPN Radio, MLB on ESPN Radio, ESPN Radio SportsCenter and NIT on ESPN Radio)
- Mel Kiper Jr.: 1992–present (ESPN Radio College Gameday and Dari and Mel)
- Christine Lisi: 1990–present (ESPN Radio SportsCenter)

=== M–Z ===
- Jay Reynolds: ?–present (ESPN Radio SportsCenter and SportsCenter AM)
- Bart Scott: 2021–present (Bart & Hahn)
- Dan Shulman: 2002–present (MLB on ESPN Radio)
- Chris Singleton: 2011–present (MLB on ESPN Radio)
- Sarah Spain: 2015–present (Spain & Prim, The Trifecta, Izzy & Spain, Spain & Fitz and Spain & Company)
- Bob Valvano: 1998–present (The V Show with Bob Valvano and NIT on ESPN Radio)

== Former ESPN Radio personalities ==
=== A–L ===
- Tony Bruno: 1992–1998 (Bruno-Golic Morning Show and GameNight)
- Will Cain: 2018–2020 (The Ryen Russillo Show and The Will Cain Show)
- Dave Campbell: 1995–2010 (MLB on ESPN Radio)
- John Clayton: 1995–2017 (The Huddle)
- Colin Cowherd: 2004–2015 (The Herd with Colin Cowherd)
- Dan Davis: 1992–2011 (ESPN Radio SportsCenter)
- Rob Dibble: 1999–2004 (The Dan Patrick Show)
- Gerry DiNardo: 2005–2007 (ESPN Radio College GameDay)
- Jim Durham: 1992–2012 (NBA on ESPN Radio)
- Jason Fitz: 2020–2023 (First Take Your Take, Spain and Fitz, Fitz and Harry)
- Doug Gottlieb: 2003–2012 (The Pulse and The Doug Gottlieb Show)
- Mike Golic: 1998–2020 (Mike and Mike and Golic and Wingo)
- Mike Golic Jr.: 2017–2022 (Golic and Wingo, Canty & Golic Jr.)
- David Jacoby (sportscaster): 2015–2022 (Jalen & Jacoby)
- Keyshawn Johnson : 2020–2023 (Keyshawn, JWill and Max)
- Bomani Jones: 2015–2017 (The Right Time with Bomani Jones)
- Danny Kanell: 2015–2017 (The Scott Van Pelt Show)
- Andy Katz: 2004–2017 (ESPN Radio College GameDay)
- Max Kellerman : 2020–2023 (The Max Kellerman Show (2020–21); Keyshawn, JWill and Max (2021–2023)
- Tony Kornheiser: 1998–2004 (The Tony Kornheiser Show)
- Erik Kuselias: 2003–2010 (The SportsBrothers, The SportsBash and The Eric Kuselias Show)
- Amy Lawrence: 2006–2012 (ESPN Radio Gameday Saturday)
- Dan Le Batard: 2013–2021 (The Dan Le Batard Show with Stugotz)

=== M–Z ===
- Todd McShay: 2005–2009 (ESPN Radio College GameDay)
- Zubin Mehenti: 2020–2021 (Keyshawn, JWill and Zubin)
- Jon Miller: 1998–2010 (MLB on ESPN Radio)
- Joe Morgan: 1998–2010 (MLB on ESPN Radio)
- Chiney Ogwumike: 2020–2021 (Chiney and Golic Jr.)
- Dan Patrick: 1989–2007 (The Dan Patrick Show)
- Bob Picozzi: 1998–2017 (ESPN Radio SportsCenter)
- Andy Pollin: 1998–2004 (The Tony Kornheiser Show and ESPN Radio College GameDay)
- Dave Revsine: 2005–2007 (ESPN Radio College GameDay)
- Dr. Jack Ramsay: 1992–2005 (NBA on ESPN Radio)
- Jeff Rickard: 2006–2009 (GameNight)
- John Rooke: 1999–2011 (ESPN Radio College GameDay and GameNight)
- Jalen Rose: 2015–2022 (Jalen & Jacoby)
- Ryen Russillo: 2007–2017 (The Baseball Show, ESPN Radio College GameDay and The Scott Van Pelt Show)
- Sean Salisbury: 2003–2008 (The Huddle)
- Mike Schopp: 2002–2006 (ESPN Radio College GameDay)
- Jon Sciambi: 2010–2020 (MLB on ESPN Radio)
- John Seibel: 2000–2009 (GameNight, The NFL on ESPN Radio and The Baseball Show)
- Stephen A. Smith: 2007–2008, 2017–2020 (The Stephen A. Smith Show)
- Mike Tirico: 2006–2016 (NBA on ESPN Radio)
- Scott Van Pelt: 2008–2015 (Tirico & Van Pelt and The Scott Van Pelt Show)
- Chuck Wilson: 1991–2011 (GameNight)
- Trey Wingo: 2017–2020 (Golic and Wingo)
- Jon "Stugotz" Weiner: 2013–2021 (The Dan Le Batard Show with Stugotz)
- Jay Williams: 2020–2023 (Keyshawn, JWill and Max)
- Todd Wright: 1996–2005 (AllNight with Todd Wright)

== See also ==
- List of ESPN personalities
