= ESPN Megacast =

Multi-channel coverage of a single sporting event

ESPN Megacast, formerly known as ESPN Full Circle, is a multi-network simulcast of a single sporting event across multiple ESPN networks and services—with each feed providing a different version of the telecast making use of different features, functions or perspectives. These simulcasts typically involve ESPN's linear television channels and internet streaming platforms, and may occasionally incorporate other Walt Disney Television networks at once.

ESPN Full Circle debuted with ESPN Full Circle: North Carolina at Duke on March 4, 2006, on the one-year anniversary of ESPNU. The game was the North Carolina Tar Heels at the Duke Blue Devils in college basketball. Five further Full Circle broadcasts were produced (one NBA playoff game, one NASCAR race and three more college basketball games) before the format was discontinued in 2007.

After a seven-year hiatus, full-circle broadcasts resumed under the Megacast branding in 2014. To date, the feature has primarily been used for the College Football Playoff and National Championship. ESPN has occasionally provided smaller-scale slates of alternate feeds during other broadcasts, although these have not always used the "Megacast" branding.

== College Basketball Megacasts ==
=== North Carolina at Duke ===
The first Full Circle telecast covered the college basketball game between the North Carolina Tar Heels and the Duke Blue Devils, to honor the one-year anniversary of the launch of ESPN's college sports network ESPNU.

ESPN aired the game's traditional coverage (along with live "look-ins" to the other views, simulcast in 120 countries through ESPN International), ESPN2 featured an "Above the Rim" camera, and ESPNU featured a split-screen with the "Cameron Crazy Cam". ESPN360 offered additional stats, hosted by ESPN Radio's Jeff Rickard, Mobile ESPN featured game alerts, live updates and in-game polling for a replay of a classic Duke-North Carolina game, and ESPN.com featured live chats, in-game polling and highlights. The ESPN and ESPN2 broadcasts were also available in HD.

The game was seen by an average of 3.78 million households on ESPN and ESPN2 making it the most-viewed men's college basketball game ever combining the networks. There were also two million page views on ESPN.com and one million video streams across ESPN.com and ESPN 360. ESPN's single network coverage garnered a 3.5 rating, the network's highest-rated men's college basketball game in more than four years (Maryland at Duke posted a 3.5 in January 2002). ESPN2's "Above the Rim" coverage generated a 0.7 rating, 40% higher than the network's per-game season average. Brad Nessler called the game along with Dick Vitale and Erin Andrews. It was the last time to date that Nessler called a Saturday Primetime game.

=== NCAA Women's Basketball Championship ===
The sixth installment of ESPN Full Circle was on April 3, 2007, in Cleveland, Ohio. The official name of the telecast was ESPN Full Circle: NCAA Women's Championship and the game was between No. 1 Tennessee Lady Volunteers and No. 4 Rutgers Scarlet Knights. It was the first women's event presented as an ESPN Full Circle telecast. Mike Patrick called the game along with Doris Burke and reporters Holly Rowe and Mark Jones. Tennessee defeated Rutgers, 59–46, winning its seventh national title.

==== Coverage ====
- ESPN (ESPNHD) featured the traditional coverage of a regular college basketball game. It also had "look-ins" to how other entities are covering the game.
- ESPN2 (ESPN2HD) had six coverage boxes; two with isolated shots of players (mainly Matee Ajavon of Rutgers and Candace Parker of Tennessee, isolated shots of the opposing coaches (C. Vivian Stringer of Rutgers and Pat Summitt of Tennessee), another alternating statistics and replays in the lower center, and a simulcast of the traditional game coverage on ESPN. This feed had separate commentators, Doug Gottlieb and Carolyn Peck. Gottlieb and Peck were also joined by guests for interviews throughout the game; he also jokingly called the setup "The Matrix". Enhanced graphics were available for those viewing the game in high definition with full-time integrated stats pillars on each side of the screen.
- ESPNU presented the Above the Rim camera angles as well as a simulcast and statistics. This feed also had commentary from Mike Hall and Charlene Curtis.
- ESPN360 offered enhanced statistics.
- ESPN.com provided in-game fan polls and live chats with, among others, Nancy Lieberman.

=== Coach K’s Last Home Game ===
For Mike Krzyzewski’s last home game as Duke head coach, ESPN broke out the MegaCast for Duke’s final home game of the 2021-22 regular season against North Carolina.

- ESPN aired the main telecast, as part of both their Saturday Primetime and Sonic Blockbuster series, with Dan Shulman, Duke alum Jay Bilas, and Holly Rowe calling the action. In addition, a special two-hour edition of College GameDay, led by Rece Davis, Bilas, Seth Greenberg, and LaPhonso Ellis, was also broadcast live from Cameron Indoor Stadium earlier in the day. The game also aired in 4K on DirecTV, Comcast, YouTube TV, and Verizon FiOS.
- ACC Network provided a second-screen alternate feed called "Coach K Curtain Call", which offered commentary from Wes Durham, Mark Packer, and Debbie Antonelli, as well as interviews with special guests throughout the game. ACC Network’s pregame show "Nothing But Net" also broadcast live from Cameron Indoor Stadium for a 90-minute pregame show prior to the game.

ESPN also had live, onsite reports from Duke starting Thursday, March 3. Various studio shows, halftime of men’s college games from Thursday through Saturday made their presence on campus as well. ESPN also had live on-site coverage all day that Saturday, which began with the 7 a.m. SportsCenter, leading into GameDay.

Every presentation was available on the ESPN app.

=== 2022 Women's Final Four ===
ESPN’s MegaCast series continued the weekend of April 3 for the 2022 Women's Final Four.

- The main telecasts of all games aired on ESPN per usual, with Ryan Ruocco, Rebecca Lobo, Holly Rowe, and Andraya Carter calling the action.
- For the semifinals, ESPNU and ESPN+ simulcast The Bird and Taurasi Show, hosted by WNBA legends Sue Bird and Diana Taurasi. In a similar approach to the Manningcast, Bird and Taurasi had their own concourse set, where they provided their own commentary and were joined by special guests throughout the night. This feed moved to ESPN2 for the Championship Game.
- ESPN+ carried different feeds, including a Second Spectrum Player Tracking broadcast, which aired on ESPN+ for the semifinals, and was simulcast on ESPNU for the Championship Game. ESPN+ also carried the Beyond the Rim and On the Rail feeds.

All broadcasts were made available on the ESPN App.

=== 2023 Women's Final Four ===
ESPN brought back their MegaCast series during the weekend of April 2 for the 2023 Women's Final Four.

- The main telecasts of the semifinals was simulcast between ESPN and ESPNU, with Ryan Ruocco, Rebecca Lobo, Holly Rowe, and Andraya Carter calling the action. The championship game aired on ABC for the first time ever. Ruocco, Lobo, Rowe, and Carter returned to call the title game as well.
- ESPN brought back The Bird and Taurasi Show, hosted by WNBA legends Sue Bird and Diana Taurasi. Bird and Taurasi had their own concourse set, where they provided their own commentary and were joined by special guests throughout the night. Unlike the previous year, every telecast aired on ESPN2.
- ESPN+ carried the Beyond the Rim and On the Rail feeds once again.

All broadcasts were made available on ESPN+ and the ESPN App.

=== 2024 Women's Final Four ===
The 2024 edition of the Women's Final Four Megacast on ESPN during the weekend of April 7 featured the same viewing options as the previous years.

- The main telecasts of the semifinals aired on ESPN, with Ryan Ruocco, Rebecca Lobo, and Holly Rowe, as well as rules analysts Lisa Mattingly and Denny Meyer, calling the action. The championship game again aired on ABC, with Ruocco, Lobo, Rowe, Mattingly, and Meyer calling the title game as well.
- The Bird and Taurasi Show presented by AT&T, hosted by WNBA legends Sue Bird and Diana Taurasi aired on ESPN2 for the semifinals, and on ESPN for the title game. Like in previous years, Bird and Taurasi had their own concourse set, where they provided their own commentary and were joined by special guests throughout the night.
- ESPN+ carried the Beyond the Rim and On the Rail feeds once again.

All broadcasts were made available on ESPN+ and the ESPN App.

=== 2025 Women's Final Four ===
The 2025 edition of the Women's Final Four Megacast on ESPN during the weekend of April 6 featured the same viewing options as the previous years.

- The main telecasts of the semifinals aired on ESPN, with Ryan Ruocco, Rebecca Lobo, and Holly Rowe, as well as rules analyst Violet Palmer, calling the action. The championship game again aired on ABC, with Ruocco, Lobo, Rowe, and Palmer calling the title game as well.
- The Bird and Taurasi Show presented by AT&T, hosted by WNBA legends Sue Bird and Diana Taurasi aired on ESPN2 for the semifinals, and on ESPN for the title game. Like in previous years, Bird and Taurasi had their own concourse set, where they provided their own commentary and were joined by special guests throughout the night.
- ESPN+ carried the Beyond the Rim and On the Rail feeds once again.

All broadcasts were made available on ESPN+, Disney+, and the ESPN App.

== NBA Megacasts ==
=== Bulls-Heat NBA Playoffs ===
This was the second installment of ESPN Full Circle, which aired on April 22, 2006. The official name of this one was ESPN Full Circle: Bulls-Heat NBA Playoffs and the game was the Chicago Bulls vs. the Miami Heat. The game was seen by an average of 2,648,000 households on ESPN and ESPN2, marking a 45% increase when compared to the equivalent NBA playoff telecast the previous year. In addition, ESPN.com's ESPN Motion received nearly 600,000 video streams for Bulls/Heat content. Mike Tirico called the game along with Bill Walton and Steve "Snapper" Jones and Jim Gray as the sideline reporter.

==== Coverage ====
- ESPN (ESPNHD) featured standard coverage of the game
- ESPN2 (ESPN2HD) featured the Above the Rim cam along with commentary from NBA Shootaround commentators John Saunders, Greg Anthony, Tim Legler and Stephen A. Smith.
- ESPN360 featured additional stats, hosted by ESPN Radio's Jeff Rickard and NBA insider John Hollinger.
- ESPN Deportes simulcast the game in Spanish with Álvaro Martín and Carlos Morales.
- ESPN.com coverage included live chats with NBA on ESPN analysts during the game, in addition to GameCast information and in-game fan polling.
- ESPN Radio provided on-site updates during ESPN Radio's GameNight.
- ESPNEWS featured in progress highlights and analysis from ESPN NBA analysts.
- Mobile ESPN provided in-progress video highlights throughout the game and halftime analysis. It also had a live scoreboard and an in-game box score.

=== NBA-Daily Wager ===
Before, ESPN's NBA Megacasts have usually seen a streaming platform air the game in different ways. On April 14, 2021, ESPN+ teamed up with ESPN to air a Daily Wager broadcast of the Brooklyn Nets-Philadelphia 76ers game with betting stats popping up during the game, and the Daily Wager crew and Kendrick Perkins providing commentary. This was available for ESPN+ subscribers, but, this telecast was also simulcast on ESPN2 for people watching on TV and streaming via their cable providers on the ESPN app.

=== NBA-Marvel Arena of Heroes Competition ===
For the first time ever, on May 3, 2021, Marvel Studios teamed up with ESPN on a Megacast of an NBA game, as Steph Curry and the Golden State Warriors faced Zion Williamson and the New Orleans Pelicans for a special "Marvel Arena of Heroes" interactive telecast where select players (Curry, Andrew Wiggins, and Draymond Green for Golden State, Williamson, Lonzo Ball, and Brandon Ingram for New Orleans), gained or lost points based on stats, e.g. 1 point for each point scored, -1 point for every basket missed. The team that had the most Arena of Heroes points are named the champions of the broadcast. Ryan Ruocco and Richard Jefferson provided commentary in a heavily-Marvel themed studio in ESPN's Bristol campus, with Marvel expert Angélique Roché providing special commentary. Like the Daily Wager Megacast, this Megacast was available on ESPN+ and ESPN2.

=== NBA CourtView ===
For the first time ever, ESPN presented one of their NBA broadcasts, completely in 3D technology. Debuting during the Mavericks-Nets game on Wednesday March 16, and called by Drew Carter and Tim Legler, this broadcast was made available on ESPN+, as well as ESPNEWS, due to ESPN2’s coverage of the NIT.

=== NBA75 Celebration Game: Nets-Knicks ===
Continuing the celebration of the NBA’s 75th anniversary, ESPN put together a special “RetroCast” of their Nets-Knicks NBA Wednesday broadcast. ESPN’s lead team of Mike Breen, Mark Jackson, Jeff Van Gundy, and Lisa Salters talked to a variety of special guests which included: Hall of Famers Oscar Robertson, Kareem Abdul-Jabbar, and Bill Walton, and legendary broadcasters Marv Albert, Bob Costas, Dick Stockton, and Hubie Brown, who was also working the main broadcast with Ryan Ruocco and Cassidy Hubbarth on ESPN. The broadcast also incorporated the style of graphics used in the 1960s, 1970s, 1980s, and 1990s, based on three respective networks: ABC for the 60s, CBS for the 70s and 80s, and NBC for the 90s (which also included the "Roundball Rock" theme), and special ABC Sports gold jackets were made and worn by the announcers. This broadcast aired on ESPN2.

=== NBA Finals: Celebrating 75: Celtics-Warriors Game 1 ===
Continuing the celebration of the NBA’s 75th anniversary, for the first time ever, ESPN put together a Megacast option for Game 1 the NBA Finals. This broadcast resembled the NBA75 Celebration Game in April. SportsCenter’s Michael Eaves, who also hosts NBA Countdown on Wednesdays, hosted this broadcast alongside New Orleans Pelicans guard CJ McCollum, who signed a deal to join ESPN in a multi-platform role, and Tim Legler. The trio provided their own commentary and talked with numerous special guests including Julius Erving and Magic Johnson. The broadcast also special graphics and footage from the NBA’s 75 year history. Due to ESPN holding commitments to the 2022 Women's College World Series, this broadcast aired on ESPN2, alongside the ABC broadcast.

=== NBA in Stephen A's World ===
In partnership with Peyton Manning's production company, Omaha Productions, ESPN created an alternate broadcast for NBA games hosted by Stephen A. Smith. In a similar approach to the Manningcast, Smith would watch the game and talk to various guests. Eight broadcasts were produced, five of them during the playoffs, and each aired on ESPN2 and ESPN+, alongside the main ESPN/ABC broadcast.

=== NBA Unplugged with Kevin Hart ===
ESPN once again teamed up with Omaha Productions to create an alternate broadcast for NBA games, this time being hosted by comedian Kevin Hart. In a similar approach to the Manningcast, Hart, along with the Plastic Cup Boyz, analyze the games in their own unique way and hold conversations with various guests. Three broadcasts were produced, with its debut during the 2023 NBA In-Season Tournament championship game. Each one aired on ESPN2, alongside the main ESPN/ABC broadcast.

=== The Bird and Taurasi Show ===
ESPN brought The Bird and Taurasi Show over to the NBA for a special Christmas Day alternate broadcast during the Milwaukee Bucks-New York Knicks game. Unlike the Women's Final Four, Bird and Taurasi both hosted the show from home, and were joined by multiple special guests throughout. This broadcast aired on ESPN2 and ESPN+, alongside the main ESPN broadcast.

=== Dunk the Halls ===
On December 25, 2024, ESPN2, Disney+ and ESPN+ featured a Dunk the Halls alternative broadcast of the Christmas game between the San Antonio Spurs and the New York Knicks. It used Hawk-Eye and other Sony-owned technology to render a live animated version of the contest being played at Main Street, USA at the Magic Kingdom, with Mickey Mouse universe characters cheering them on. A second edition of Dunk the Halls was produced a year later for the Knicks' Christmas Day game against the Cleveland Cavaliers.

=== 2026 NBA Finals ===
For the 2026 NBA Finals, ESPN put together numerous ways for viewers to experience the series. Layup Lines and SkyCam options were available for ESPN Unlimited subcribers, while radio feeds from both the Spurs and Knicks were also utilized alongside the national feed on ESPN Radio. ESPN Deportes also broadcast each game in Spanish.

ESPN also put together an altcast option for Game 3 in New York. This version was hosted by Pat McAfee, College GameDay analyst and host of The Pat McAfee Show, and his castmates. They were joined by Kendrick Perkins, Quentin Richardson, and special guests throughout the game.

== NASCAR Busch Series Telcel-Motorola Mexico 200 ==
The fifth installment of ESPN Full Circle aired on March 4, 2007, a NASCAR Busch Series race held at Autodromo Hermanos Rodriguez in Mexico City. This was the first NASCAR race on Full Circle. ESPN's regular NASCAR announce team of Dr. Jerry Punch called the race along with analysis from Rusty Wallace and Andy Petree. Allen Bestwick, Mike Massaro, Jamie Little, and Dave Burns reported from pit lane.

=== Coverage ===
- ESPN (ESPNHD) and ESPN Deportes featured a simulcast of the traditional race coverage in the Spanish language. This was the first event not covered in English by ESPN. During the race, viewers were asked to call 1-800-DEPORTES or log on to the network's website to express interest in adding it to their providers' channel lineups.
- ESPN2 (ESPN2HD) had the traditional race coverage in English.
- ESPN360 offered different camera views from the regular race.
- ESPNEWS provided updates through the event.

== College Football Megacasts ==
=== Florida State at Miami ===
This was the third installment of ESPN Full Circle, which aired on September 4, 2006. The official name of this one was ESPN Full Circle: Florida State at Miami and the game was a college football matchup between the Florida State Seminoles at the Miami Hurricanes. ESPN's coverage of the game averaged 6,330,000 households (a 6.9 rating), making it the network's most-viewed college football game (including regular season and bowl games) ever. It was then the network's second highest-rated college football game (including regular season and bowl games) ever (behind a 7.7 rating for Florida State at Miami on ESPN October 8, 1994). The telecast was television's most-viewed program of the night across key male 18-to-34 (1,687,000 average), 18-to-49 (3,466,000) and 25-to-54 (3,453,000) demographics and fourth most-viewed program in households. Mike Patrick called the game along with analysis from Todd Blackledge and Holly Rowe reporting from the sideline.

==== Coverage ====
- ESPN (ESPNHD) featured the traditional coverage of a not so regular football game. It also had "look-ins" to how other entities were covering the game
- ESPN2 (ESPN2HD) offered coverage of the game utilizing multiple camera angles in a mosaic-style presentation. The screen featured the primary ESPN telecast surrounded by seven additional camera angles that include isolations of the coaches, quarterbacks, running backs, receivers and other key offensive and defensive matchups. The screen at the bottom featured the SkyCam angle throughout the entire game.
- ESPNU televised the game from the SkyCam angle and feature the unique commentary and perspectives of ESPN Radio's Colin Cowherd. He reacted to the game and was joined by special guests.
- ESPN 360 offered a simulcast feed of ESPNU's SkyCam presentation with extra stats during commercial breaks.
- ESPN Deportes offered traditional game coverage with Spanish language commentary.
- Mobile ESPN targeted specifically to sports fans will provide a variety of content, including game alerts, live updates and in-game polling.
- ESPN International had a traditional telecast offered to approximately 54 countries worldwide.
- ESPN.com had a live chat with Jim Donnan, reports from Ivan Maisel, GameCast's real-time animated game representation and in-game polling.
- ESPNEWS offered frequent updates and analysis.
- ESPN Radio provided in-game updates from GameNight, on-site reports and periodic live audio of Colin Cowherd's commentary from ESPNU.

=== Florida vs. Auburn ===
This was the fourth installment of ESPN Full Circle, which aired on October 14, 2006. The official name of this one was ESPN Full Circle delivered by The New AT&T: Florida vs. Auburn and the game was a college football matchup between the Florida Gators at the Auburn Tigers. It generated the lowest ratings of any of the Full Circle telecasts with a 3.3 rating. This was also the second college football game on Full Circle. Mike Patrick called the game along with analysis from Todd Blackledge and Holly Rowe reporting from the sideline.

==== Coverage ====
- ESPN (ESPNHD) featured the traditional coverage of the college football game. It also had "look-ins" to how other entities were covering the game
- ESPN2 (ESPN2HD) featured the traditional game coverage surrounded by four other angles in smaller screens in a mosaic-style presentation that will isolate the head coaches, the quarterbacks as well as provide the full-time view from Skycam. ESPN Radio's Colin Cowherd provided commentary and react to the game and was joined by special guests including Chris Fowler, Lee Corso, Mark May, Lou Holtz and Mel Kiper Jr.
- ESPNU will feature the traditional game coverage on the main screen surrounded by five smaller screens, including isolation angles of the head coaches, the quarterbacks, and other storyline-driven views plus the full-time view from Skycam.
- ESPN 360 offered a simulcast feed of ESPNU's SkyCam presentation with extra stats during commercial breaks.
- Mobile ESPN televised live full game coverage streamed live on the phone, plus in-game alerts and highlights, as well as preview video clips and interviews.
- ESPN International had a traditional telecast offered to approximately 175 countries worldwide and at US Naval ships around the world.
- ESPN.com had a live chat with Pat Forde, reports from Ivan Maisel, GameCast's real-time animated game representation and in-game polling.
- ESPNEWS offered game highlights and opinions from ESPN's college football commentators, pre- and post-game analysis and live press conferences.
- ESPN Radio provided in-game updates from GameNight, on-site reports and periodic live audio of Colin Cowherd's commentary from ESPNU.
- College GameDay was broadcast live from the campus of Auburn University at the usual time of 10 a.m. ET and signed off at 12:01 pm.

=== BCS National Championship Game ===
In December 2013, ESPN announced that it would cover the 2014 BCS National Championship Game with what it branded as a Megacast:

- ESPN carried traditional coverage of the game with Brent Musburger and Kirk Herbstreit, and ESPN Deportes broadcast the game in Spanish.
- ESPN2 aired BCS Title Talk, a broadcast of the game with special guests (such as celebrities and coaches) providing analysis
- ESPNU aired BCS Film Room, which featured expert analysis of plays hosted by Chris Spielman and Tom Luginbill
- ESPN Classic carried the game without commentary (Sounds of the BCS).
- ESPN Goal Line carried BCS Command Center, a split-screen view with live, on-screen statistics
- WatchESPN carried several online-exclusive feeds, including a Spidercam feed, and feeds featuring the Auburn Tigers and Florida State Seminoles radio broadcasts.

=== 2014 Iron Bowl ===
In November 2014, ESPN broadcast that season's edition of the Iron Bowl rivalry game between the Alabama Crimson Tide and Auburn Tigers. The game was accompanied by a special simulcast on SEC Network, the Finebaum Film Room, where Paul Finebaum, Cole Cubelic and Greg McElroy analyzed the game and took viewer calls.

=== 2015 College Football Playoff National Championship ===
The Megacast returned for the 2015 College Football Playoff National Championship;

- ESPN carried traditional coverage of the game with Chris Fowler and Kirk Herbstreit. The Film Room moved to ESPN2, ESPN Classic carried the commentary-free "sounds of the game" feed, and ESPN Goal Line again carried Command Center, a split-screen view with live, on-screen statistics and ESPN Radio audio.
- ESPNews carried Off The Ball, which carried person-on-person analysis of players not near the ball, hosted by Bob Wischusen
- ESPNU carried "Voices", which featured special guests providing analysis (similar to 2014's BCS Title Talk)
- WatchESPN carried several online-exclusive feeds, including the Spidercam, student sections, and team feeds with simulcasts of their respective radio networks.

=== 2016 College Football Playoff ===
For 2016, enhanced feeds were expanded to the College Football Playoff semi-final bowl games, the 2015 Orange Bowl and 2015 Cotton Bowl Classic. ESPN2 aired a simulcast of ESPN Deportes' Spanish-language coverage, and home and away radio broadcast feeds were carried on WatchESPN. Owing to the participation of Alabama, the Cotton Bowl broadcast additionally featured the return of the Finebaum Film Room on SEC Network, as previously featured during the 2014 Iron Bowl.

ESPN provided enhanced feeds during the 2016 College Football Playoff National Championship;

- As with the previous year, ESPN carried traditional coverage of the game, ESPN2 carried the Film Room with Brian Griese, Chris Spielman, and Jim McElwain, ESPN Deportes carried the game in Spanish, ESPN Classic carried a feed without commentary, and ESPN Goal Line carried the Command Center.
- ESPNews carried ESPN Voices, with special guests discussing the game.
- ESPNU carried the Homer Telecast, with Joe Tessitore on play-by-play and discussion of the game from the opposing viewpoints of Clemson alumni Tajh Boyd and Alabama alumni Barrett Jones.
- SEC Network carried the Finebaum Film Room, with Paul Finebaum, Greg McElroy, Booger McFarland, and Bret Bielema analyzing the game from the SEC perspective and taking viewer calls.
- WatchESPN carried several online-exclusive feeds, including the Spidercam, Pylon Cam (which feature feeds from cameras installed within the pylons at the sides of the field), team feeds with simulcasts of their respective radio networks and focus on star players, the Data Center with advanced statistics, and the Student Section cam. A new addition for 2016 was the Mock Replay Booth, which featured former ACC official Ralph Pickett, current SEC official Ben Oldham, and ESPN rules analyst Doug Rhoads providing an "inside look at the review process in which replay officials review every play of the game."

In Canada, the Film Room feed was carried by TSN2 (a sister network to the ESPN-affiliated TSN, which simulcast the ESPN broadcast across its main regional channels), while the TSN website carried ESPN Voices, Homer Telecast and Finebaum Film Room online. RDS carried a French language broadcast.

=== 2017 College Football Playoff ===
The Peach Bowl and Fiesta Bowl semi-final games were broadcast with Command Center on ESPN2, and Skycam, DataCenter (a simulcast of the main broadcast on ESPN with additional statistic displays), and simulcasts with audio from the participating teams' radio networks on WatchESPN. During the Peach Bowl, played between Alabama and Washington, SEC Network featured the Finebaum Film Room.

For the championship game, ESPN2 carried a reprise of the "homer" commentary featuring Joe Tessitore, Adam Amin, Tajh Boyd, and Barrett Jones, ESPN Voices (with Michelle Beadle, Keyshawn Johnson, Bill Walton, and Marcellus Wiley) aired on ESPNU, SEC Network carried the Finebaum Film Room, ESPNews carried the Coaches Film Room (hosted by Brian Griese, featuring discussion of the game with Dino Babers, Steve Addazio, Kalani Sitake, Dave Doeren, Mike MacIntrye, and Matt Rhule), and ESPN Goal Line carried Command Center. WatchESPN carried the Mock Replay Booth, DataCenter, as well as Skycam, Pylon Cam, Taco Bell Student Section, and simulcasts with audio from the participating teams' radio networks.

In Canada, the Homer Telecast, ESPN Voices, and the Coaches Film Room were available for streaming via TSN Go.

=== 2017 Ohio State–Indiana game ===
On August 15, 2017, ESPN announced it would utilize its Megacast production on its August 31 college football season opener featuring Ohio State at Indiana. ESPNews carried the "Coaches' Film Room" (with the on-air debut of Les Miles), ESPNU carried a "homer" broadcast with Dan Dakich, Adnan Virk, and Joe Tessitore, while ESPN Goal Line carried Command Center. ESPNU also carried Field Pass, a pre-game show hosted from inside Memorial Stadium. "DataCenter", all-22, and skycam views were available on the ESPN App.

=== 2018 College Football Playoff and New Year's Six ===
For the December 2017 Cotton Bowl Classic, ESPN carried the main game while the ESPN App offered All-22, Command Center and Skycam views. ESPN's other linear channels did not participate for that game because of college basketball commitments.

For the 2018 Outback Bowl, ESPN2 carried the main game while the ESPN App offered only the SkyCam view. ESPN was airing the 2018 Peach Bowl at the same time so therefore the Outback Bowl was moved to ESPN2.

For the semifinal games—the 2018 Rose Bowl and Sugar Bowl, ESPNews offered the Film Room (featuring Syracuse's Dino Barbers, North Carolina's Larry Fedora, West Virginia's Dana Holgorsen, Ole Miss' Matt Luke, TCU's Gary Patterson, and former Arkansas and Wisconsin coach Bret Bielema), as well as the Command Center (ESPN2), Finebaum Film Room (SEC Network), DataCenter (ESPN Goal Line) and other feeds on the ESPN App.

In addition to these feeds, the 2018 College Football Playoff National Championship added the "Homer Telecast" (ESPN2) with then New York Giants cornerback Landon Collins representing Alabama and former Georgia quarterback and current CBS Sports analyst Aaron Murray representing Georgia.

=== 2018 Virginia Tech vs. Florida State ===
For the September 3, 2018 (Labor Day) contest between Florida State and Virginia Tech, ESPN aired a six-channel megacast, with Coaches Film Room on ESPNEWS, Command Center on ESPNU, and Data Center and Skycam on ESPN3, in addition to the traditional telecast on ESPN. ESPN also planned to have a "BlimpCast" with Marty Smith and Ryan McGee calling the game from the world famous Goodyear Blimp. That was to be seen on the ESPN app. However, the "BlimpCast" was canceled at the last minute due to severe weather in the Tallahassee area. Instead, Marty and McGee did their own Megacast production from the sidelines, which was seen on the app.

=== 2019 College Football Playoff Championship ===
For the 2019 College Football Playoff National Championship, ESPN dramatically reorganized the Megacast offerings. On ESPN2, replacing the Homer Telecast was "Field Pass," where Adam Amin and Steve Levy covered the game from the sidelines with guests. ESPNews carried the "Monday Night Football Film Room", which featured analysis and discussion by the MNF commentary crew of Joe Tessitore, Jason Witten, and Booger McFarland, joined by Todd McShay. SEC Network carried a feed hosted by the panel of Thinking Out Loud (Marcus Spears, Greg McElroy and Alyssa Lang). ESPN Classic again carried the commentary-free Sounds of the Game (which included the halftime performances) while ESPNU carried Command Center.. ESPN3 offered hometown radio broadcasts, two different angles of skycam, an angle from the Goodyear Blimp, a wider all-22 angle, and a combined "TechCast" that shows multiple camera angles.

=== 2020 College Football Playoff Championship ===
New to the Megacast for 2020 was a "Refcast," which featured a panel of former officials to analyze calls made by the in-game officials, and views from mobile cameras worn by the officials and chain crew. SEC Network and ACC Network picked up the radio broadcasts for LSU and Clemson respectively. Command Center moved to ESPNEWS while ESPNU revived the Coaches Film Room. The main telecast, Field Pass, Sounds of the Game, all-22, DataCenter and a single skycam angle were carried over as they were in 2019, with the remaining feeds dropped.

=== 2021 College Football Playoff ===
For the 2021 Rose Bowl and Sugar Bowl semi-final games, ESPN offered the Command Center, SkyCast, Datacenter, all-22, and home radio feeds across its television networks and digital.

The national championship game featured most of the same options introduced for 2020, but with ESPN2 introducing the new "CFP Live" broadcast (hosted by the panel of ESPN's NFL Live), the Film Room moving to ESPNews, and the SkyCast moving to ESPNU. SEC Network took Alabama's radio feed, with Ohio State's radio broadcast, as well as the Command Center, Datacenter, Refcast, High SkyCam, and All-22 exclusive to streaming. A 4K SkyCam feed sponsored by Samsung was also offered via selected television providers. This was the last year that Sounds of the Game aired on ESPN Classic, as the channel is scheduled to shut down December 31, 2021.

=== 2022 College Football Playoff ===
In addition to the semifinals (the Cotton Bowl and the Orange Bowl), all New Year’s Six games (Peach Bowl, Fiesta Bowl, Rose Bowl, and Sugar Bowl), received the Megacast treatment. ESPN offered the Command Center, SkyCast, and All-22 for all games, with the home radio feeds, and halftime band performances for the semifinals.

The national championship game’s Megacast featured ESPN2 carrying the Film Room with Dusty Dvoracek joining Texas A&M head coach Jimbo Fisher and his coaching staff in College Station to provide analysis. ESPNU carried Command Center, while SkyCast moved to ESPNEWS with Anish Shroff and Kelly Stouffer providing commentary. Also part of the presentation is the Spanish-language telecast on ESPN Deportes and SEC Network carrying the local radio feed (Alabama in the first half and Georgia in the second half), with full coverage of Hometown Radio, as well as High Skycast, All-22 and halftime bands available digitally.

=== College Football Primetime with The Pat McAfee Show ===
In 2022, as a tie-in with his agreement to join College GameDay, Pat McAfee began to host an alternate broadcast for six Saturday night games on ESPN2 known as College Football Primetime with The Pat McAfee Show, which would be produced by Omaha Productions.

=== 2023 College Football Playoff ===
Like last season, ESPN hosted Megacast coverage for all game surrounding the New Year’s Six. Among these broadcasts were two new Playoff Semifinal editions of “CFB Primetime with The Pat McAfee Show”, which served as the Field Pass broadcast on ESPN2 for both the VRBO Fiesta Bowl and the Chick-fil-A Peach Bowl. ESPN continued to offer the Command Center and AT&T 5G SkyCast for all games, with All-22, the home radio feeds, and new this year, a marching band camera feed for the semifinals. In addition, ESPNU simulcast the Command Center, while both SEC Network and ACC Network both simulcast the SkyCast for the Orange Bowl, with the former also simulcasting the Command Center for the Sugar Bowl.

The national championship game’s Megacast replaced the Film Room on ESPN2 with "Field Pass with The Pat McAfee Show", which featured McAfee hosting an entertainment-oriented broadcast from the sidelines, joined by Pat McAfee Show regulars A. J. Hawk, Darius Butler and Connor Campbell, and celebrity guests. ESPNU carried Command Center, while the AT&T 5G SkyCast aired on ESPNews. Comcast, DirecTV, YouTube TV, and Verizon subscribers got a separate SkyCam feed in 4K. Also part of the presentation was the Spanish-language telecast on ESPN Deportes and SEC Network carrying Georgia’s local radio feed. The All-22, TCU local radio, and marching band feeds were all available on the ESPN app.

=== 2024 College Football Playoff ===
ESPN's famous Megacast coverage returned for all games surrounding the New Year’s Six. Among the viewing options was the return of the fan favorite “Field Pass with The Pat McAfee Show” on ESPN2 for both the Rose Bowl Game presented by Prudential, where Pat McAfee and his friends hosted, and the Allstate Sugar Bowl, which was hosted by Cole Cubelic and other ESPN personalities. ESPN continued to offer the Command Center and SkyCast for all games, with All-22, the home radio feeds, and a marching band camera feed for the semifinals. In addition, ESPNU simulcast the Command Center, while ACC Network simulcast the Command Center for the Orange Bowl. Alabama's radio broadcast was also simulcast on SEC Network

The national championship game’s Megacast had similar alternate feeds, including “Field Pass with The Pat McAfee Show” on ESPN2. ESPNU carried Command Center, while the SkyCast aired on ESPNEWS. For the second consecutive year, Comcast, DirecTV, YouTube TV, and Verizon subscribers got a separate SkyCam feed in 4K. Also part of the presentation was the Spanish-language telecast on ESPN Deportes. The All-22, local radio, and marching band feeds were all available on the ESPN app.

=== 2024 SEC Championship Game ===
ESPN brought back its Megacast coverage for the 2024 SEC Championship Game, a top 5 rematch between #5 Georgia and #2 Texas. The winner also received the SEC's automatic berth in the new 12-team College Football Playoff. The Megacast went as follows:

- ABC aired the main feed of the game, the first time the network has done so since 2000. ESPN's top broadcast crew of Chris Fowler, Kirk Herbstreit, Holly Rowe, and Bill LeMonnier called the action, with Laura Rutledge (host of SEC Nation and NFL Live), joining Rowe on the sidelines.
- ESPN aired the "Field Pass" option, hosted by Cole Cubelic, who was joined by Harry Douglas, Marty Smith, and Ryan McGee. This option concluded on ESPNEWS due to ESPN's prior commitment to the 2024 Sun Belt Conference Football Championship Game.
- SEC Network aired the SkyCast option, which featured commentary from SEC Nation's Tim Tebow, Jordan Rodgers, and Roman Harper.

All broadcasts were available on the ESPN app.

=== 2024-25 College Football Playoff ===
ESPN's Megacast coverage returned for all games surrounding the newly-expanded College Football Playoff in 2024-25. The Megacast began with the new First Round games on December 20 and 21. Both of ESPN's telecasts (#10 Indiana-#7 Notre Dame on the 20th and #9 Tennessee-#8 Ohio State on the 21st), were simulcast on ABC, the first time the network has aired a CFP game in any form, and feature a Command Center and SkyCast feed, as well as a Marching Band feed. For Indiana-Notre Dame, the Command Center was shown on ESPN2, while the SkyCast was shown on ESPNU. For Tennessee-Ohio State, ESPN brought back “Field Pass with The Pat McAfee Show”, hosted by Pat McAfee and his friends, on ESPN2. Because of this, the Command Center shifted to ESPNU, while SkyCast shifted to ESPNEWS, as well as SEC Network, with the latter also broadcasting the Hometown Radio feed from Tennessee.

ESPN's Megacast plans for the National Quarterfinals mostly remained the same from their first round coverage, minus the ABC simulcasts. Each game had a Command Center feed (on ESPN2 for the Fiesta and Peach Bowls, ESPNU for the Rose and Sugar Bowls), and a SkyCast feed (on ESPNU for the Fiesta and Peach Bowls, ESPNEWS for the Rose and Sugar Bowls, and SEC Network for the Peach Bowl with Texas Hometown Radio). The Rose Bowl featured “Field Pass with The Pat McAfee Show”, hosted by Pat McAfee and his friends, airing on ESPN2. ESPN's Sugar Bowl Megacast was altered due to the game's postponement, which saw the Command Center and SkyCast shift to ESPNU and ESPNEWS respectively as noted above, and the SkyCast with Georgia's Hometown Radio shift from SEC Network to the ESPN App.

For the National Semifinals, the Cotton and Orange Bowls, ESPN's Megacast coverage mostly remained the same, except “Field Pass with The Pat McAfee Show” now airs for both semifinals. Because of this, Command Center shifts to ESPNU, while SkyCast shifts to ESPNEWS. In addition, for the Cotton Bowl, SEC Network aired the game with Texas's Hometown Radio.

For the national championship game, ESPN's Megacast feeds remained the same as in the previous rounds. With ESPN carrying the main feed, “Field Pass with The Pat McAfee Show” once again aired on ESPN2. ESPNU carried Command Center, while the SkyCast aired on ESPNEWS. After previously only airing a SkyCast feed in 4K, Comcast, DirecTV, YouTube TV, Verizon, Optimum, Sling TV, and Dish Network subscribers got the entire game in 4K for the first time ever. Also part of the presentation was the Spanish-language telecast on ESPN Deportes. The All-22, local radio, and marching band feeds were all available on the ESPN app.

=== Field Pass with ACC Huddle ===
For the Miami-Florida State game on October 4, ESPN brought back the "Field Pass" alternate broadcast. For this edition, the ACC Huddle pregame show crew of Taylor Tannebaum, a Florida State alum, Eric Mac Lain, Eddie Royal, and Jimbo Fisher, former Florida State head coach, hosted the broadcast, roaming the sidelines of Doak Campbell Stadium.

This broadcast aired alongside the main ABC broadcast, called by Chris Fowler, Kirk Herbstreit, Holly Rowe, and Bill LeMonnier, on ACC Network at 7:30 ET. Both feeds were available on the enhanced ESPN App, through the ESPN DTC Unlimited plan.

=== 2025 Dr. Pepper Championship Week on ABC ===
For Championship Weekend in 2025, ESPN decided to broaden its coverage of the SEC and ACC Championship games with alternate feeds of both games.

For the SEC Championship Game:

- ABC aired the main feed of the game, with their top broadcast crew of Chris Fowler, Kirk Herbstreit, Holly Rowe, and Bill LeMonnier on the call of the action, with Laura Rutledge (host of SEC Nation and NFL Live), joining Rowe on the sidelines.
- ESPN brought back the "Field Pass" option, this time hosted by Harry Douglas, who was joined by Will Compton, Taylor Lewan, and Josh Pate.
- SEC Network aired a SkyCast option, providing aerial coverage of the game.

For the ACC Championship Game:

- ABC aired the main feed of the game, with Sean McDonough, Greg McElroy, Molly McGrath, and Matt Austin on the call of the action, with Taylor McGregor joining McGrath on the sidelines.
- ACC Network also aired a "Field Pass" option, hosted by the ACC Huddle pregame show crew of Taylor Tannebaum, Eric Mac Lain, and Eddie Royal.

All feeds were available on the enhanced ESPN App, through the ESPN DTC Unlimited plan, with the ABC games also available on Disney+.

=== 2025-26 College Football Playoff ===
ESPN's Megacast coverage returned for all games surrounding the College Football Playoff in 2025-26. The Megacast began with the First Round games on December 19 and 20. Both of ESPN's telecasts (#9 Alabama-#8 Oklahoma on the 19th and #10 Miami-#7 Texas A&M on the 20th), were simulcast on ABC, and featured SkyCast feeds with team-specific radio broadcasts. For Alabama-Oklahoma, the Command Center was shown on ESPNEWS, while SkyCast was shown on both ESPN2 and SEC Network, each taking the radio feeds from each team, ESPN2 taking Oklahoma and SEC Network taking Alabama. For Miami-Texas A&M, ESPN brought back “Field Pass with The Pat McAfee Show”, hosted by Pat McAfee and his friends, on ESPN2. Three different SkyCast feeds were shown, ESPNEWS had one, SEC Network's feed had Texas A&M's radio broadcast, and ACC Network's feed featured Miami's radio broadcast. Both games were broadcast in 4K, on ESPN Radio, and in Spanish on ESPN Deportes.

ESPN's Megacast plans for the National Quarterfinals mostly remained the same from their first round coverage, minus the ABC simulcasts. Each game had a Command Center feed (on ESPNEWS for the Cotton and Rose Bowls, ESPNU for the Orange and Sugar Bowls), and a SkyCast feed (on ESPNU for the Cotton and Rose Bowls, ESPN2 for the Orange and Sugar Bowl, the latter featuring Georgia Hometown Radio, and SEC Network for the Sugar Bowl with Ole Miss Hometown Radio). The Cotton and Rose Bowls each featured “Field Pass with The Pat McAfee Show”, hosted by Pat McAfee and his friends, airing on ESPN2. ACC Network also aired a Field Pass feed, hosted by the ACC Huddle crew. ESPN Radio and ESPN Deportes returned with their broadcasts, while the Rose Bowl also featured a 4K broadcast.

For the National Semifinals, the Fiesta and Peach Bowls, ESPN's Megacast coverage mostly remained the same, except “Field Pass with The Pat McAfee Show” now airs for both semifinals. Command Center aired on ESPNEWS, while SkyCast shifts to ESPNU. In addition, for the Fiesta Bowl, SEC Network aired the SkyCast feed with Ole Miss Hometown Radio, while ACC Network aired another version of the Field Pass, hosted by the ACC Huddle crew. Both semifinals also aired in 4K and All-22 feeds, while ESPN Radio and ESPN Deportes returned with their broadcasts.

For the national championship game, ESPN's Megacast feeds remained the same as in the previous rounds. With ESPN carrying the main feed, “Field Pass with The Pat McAfee Show” once again aired on ESPN2, and ACC Huddle's Field Pass returned on ACC Network. ESPNU carried a Film Room broadcast, while the SkyCast aired on ESPNEWS. ESPN Radio and ESPN Deportes returned with their broadcasts, while command center, All-22, local radio, and marching band feeds were all available on the enhanced ESPN app.

== NFL and Monday Night Megacasts ==
=== NFL draft ===
In response to a 2018 agreement in which Fox would simulcast NFL Network's coverage of the 2018 NFL draft on broadcast agreement, ESPN, which has long held non-exclusive rights to the draft, announced it would expand its coverage for the 2018 draft to a multi-channel megacast.

- ESPN and ESPN Deportes carried its usual draft coverage on opening night.
- ESPN2 carried an alternate broadcast of the first night hosted by the College GameDay panel.
- ABC aired the final day of the draft in simulcast with ESPN.

These arrangements were largely reprised for the 2019 draft, but with the College GameDay panel moving to ABC for its primetime coverage of the first two nights (which would feature an entertainment-oriented format). For the 2020 draft, due to the COVID-19 pandemic, ESPN's coverage was simulcast on NFL Network. The above arrangements returned for the 2021 NFL draft, with NFL Network restoring their own coverage, and ESPN producing their telecast, and ABC's telecast.

=== Pro Bowl ===
ESPN has carried the Pro Bowl since 2015. ABC later started simulcasting the game in 2018. For the 2019, 2020, and 2022 games, Disney XD was added to the simulcast. In contrast to college sports events, all of the simulcast partners for the Pro Bowl carry the same feed. The Disney XD simulcast in 2020 ended during the second quarter due to ABC and ESPN's continuing coverage of the death of NBA legend Kobe Bryant and his daughter Gianna. For 2021, ESPN, ABC, and Disney XD simulcast a special honoring the Pro Bowlers and their achievements during the 2020 season, as the COVID-19 pandemic canceled the game which was going to be held at Allegiant Stadium in Las Vegas, NV.

=== 2020 Saints–Raiders game ===
To celebrate the first NFL game in Las Vegas, and the 50th anniversary of Monday Night Football, ESPN held a Megacast the September 21 game between the New Orleans Saints and the Las Vegas Raiders. This was the first time that ESPN had ever Megacast an NFL regular-season game.

- ESPN and ABC, who hadn't broadcast an NFL regular season game since 2005, both simulcast the game with the regular MNF team of Steve Levy, Brian Griese, Louis Riddick, Lisa Salters, and John Parry live from Las Vegas.
- ESPN2 aired a special "watch party" telecast, hosted by College GameDay's Rece Davis from ESPN's main headquarters in Bristol, CT, and ESPN's lead college football analyst Kirk Herbstreit from his home in Nashville, TN. The College GameDay teammates talked with various special guests, including Peyton Manning and Charles Barkley, throughout the game.
- ESPN Deportes aired the game in Spanish.

=== 2021 NFL Super Wild Card Weekend: Ravens vs. Titans ===
Since 2015, ESPN owned rights to one NFL Wild Card game, which they simulcast on ABC and ESPN Deportes starting in 2016. On November 30, to go along with the announcement that ABC would simulcast two late-season MNF games (which both involved the Buffalo Bills), ESPN announced that the Megacast would return for the NFL Playoffs, with the game airing on ESPN, ABC, ESPN2, and ESPN Deportes (the same networks that were involved with the Week 2 Megacast), but this time, they included Disney-owned network Freeform, in an effort to attract a younger/female audience, similar to CBS' plan to simulcast their second Wild Card game on Nickelodeon, along with ESPN+. The announcement came after ESPN's Week 2 Megacast was deemed a success. This was the first NFL playoff game that ESPN2 will broadcast, and the first sports event to air on Freeform since the MLB Postseason in 2002. The Megacast went as follows:

- ESPN and ABC simulcast the game with the regular MNF team of Steve Levy, Brian Griese, Louis Riddick, Lisa Salters, and John Parry live from Nashville.
- ESPN2 aired the Film Room, with personalities from NFL Live and Sunday and Monday NFL Countdown providing their own commentary from ESPN's Seaport District Studios in New York City.
- The Watch Party telecast returned, but this time, ESPN moved it to Freeform. The watch party this time was hosted by Jesse Palmer and Maria Taylor, who were live from Miami for the CFP National Championship Game the next day on ESPN. The duo talked with various special guests, including chef Duff Goldman, a huge Ravens fan, throughout the broadcast, which also featured a live halftime performance from DJ Khaled.
- ESPN+ broadcast Between the Lines, featuring the NFL Live and Daily Wager crews providing analytics, odds, and real-time analysis throughout the game. The NFL Live crew worked from Bristol awhile the Daily Wager crew worked from Las Vegas.
- ESPN Deportes aired the game in Spanish.

All ESPN productions except Freeform were available on the ESPN app. The Freeform Watch Party was available on the NFL App.

=== Manningcast ===
On July 19, 2021, ESPN announced a new 3-year partnership with Hall of Fame QB Peyton Manning and his production company Omaha Productions. This new deal will include the "ManningCast", a newly revamped version of the "Monday Night Megacast", which will feature Peyton and his younger brother Eli Manning, as well as celebrities and athletes. ESPN and Omaha Productions will produce 10 editions of this Megacast each season, which will begin in 2021, with the first three MNF games of the season. These telecasts will take place remotely, and will air on ESPN2, with a potential distribution across various Disney platforms and ESPN+. A multi-box viewing experience will always be shown, with the ESPN/ABC game feed being shown on one box, and Peyton and Eli's feed in another box.

Original plans had the Mannings being joined by a weekly guest host, but ultimately, ESPN decided to feature guests during each game in a less prominent capacity, instead letting the Mannings analyze the game themselves. Both will be live from Denver and New Jersey respectively, although the first week will be from the ESPN Seaport District Studios due to prior scheduling conflicts.

After a very successful first season, ESPN and Omaha Productions agreed to a one-year extension of the Manningcast, while also expanding Omaha Productions’ Megacast production rights to other sports like: college football, UFC events, and select golf tournaments. ESPN's deal with Omaha Productions has since been extended through 2034.

=== 2021 Ravens-Raiders game ===
Nearly a year after their first ever NFL Megacast, ESPN held another Monday Night Megacast for the September 13 game between the Baltimore Ravens and the Raiders to celebrate the first NFL game at Allegiant Stadium with fans in attendance.

- ESPN and ABC once again simulcast the game with the regular MNF team of Steve Levy, Brian Griese, Louis Riddick, Lisa Salters, and John Parry live from Las Vegas.
- ESPN2 aired the first edition of the "ManningCast", hosted by Peyton and Eli Manning, live from the ESPN Seaport District Studios in New York City. While analyzing the game, they both talked with various special guests throughout the game including Seattle Seahawks quarterback Russell Wilson.
- ESPN+ also broadcast Between the Lines, which featured the NFL Live and Daily Wager crews providing analytics, odds, and real-time analysis throughout the game. The NFL Live crew worked from Bristol, while the Daily Wager crew worked from Las Vegas.
- ESPN Deportes aired the game in Spanish.

All broadcasts were available to be streamed live on the ESPN App.

=== 2022 Monday Night Super Wild Card Game: Cardinals vs. Rams ===
The NFL Playoff Megacast returned for the 2022 playoffs. This year, with the NFL moving a game to Monday Night, ESPN signed a 5-year deal to not only air the Monday Night Wild Card Game, but also give it the Megacast treatment. The 2022 Megacast between the Cardinals and Rams went as follows:

- ESPN and ABC once again simulcast the game with the regular MNF team of Steve Levy, Brian Griese, Louis Riddick, Lisa Salters, and John Parry calling the game from Los Angeles.
- ESPN2 aired a special playoff edition of the "ManningCast", hosted by Peyton and Eli Manning, live from their homes.
- ESPN+ also broadcast Between the Lines, which once again featured the NFL Live and Daily Wager crews providing analytics, odds, and real-time analysis throughout the game. The NFL Live crew worked from Bristol, while the Daily Wager crew worked from Las Vegas.
- ESPN Deportes aired the game in Spanish.

All broadcasts were available on ESPN+, via the ESPN app, as well as the NFL and Yahoo! platforms.

=== 2023 Monday Night Super Wild Card Game: Cowboys vs. Buccaneers ===
Once again, ESPN and ABC aired a Monday Night Super Wild Card Game. This year’s Megacast between the Cowboys and Buccaneers went as follows:

- ESPN and ABC once again simulcast the game with the regular MNF team of Joe Buck, Troy Aikman, Lisa Salters, and John Parry calling the game from Tampa. This was also the first playoff game Buck and Aikman called for ESPN and ABC.
- ESPN2 and ESPN+ aired a special playoff edition of the "ManningCast", hosted by Peyton and Eli Manning, live from their homes.
- ESPN Deportes aired the game in Spanish.

All broadcasts were available on the ESPN app, as well as ESPN+, and NFL+.

=== Funday Football ===
On October 1, 2023, ESPN presented a kid-friendly alternate animated broadcast of the London game between the Atlanta Falcons and the Jacksonville Jaguars, focused on the popular Pixar franchise Toy Story. Similar to the “NHL Big City Greens Classic” that aired in March, this broadcast also animated every player on a football field board game in the middle of Andy’s Room. ESPN's Drew Carter and Booger McFarland called the game with Pepper Persley, who has reported for ESPN during their KidsCast coverage of the MLB Little League Classic, reporting from the sidelines. Toy Story characters also appeared throughout the broadcast, including a halftime show featuring Toy Story 4 character Duke Caboom that was animated by ESPN Creative Studio. This broadcast aired on Disney+ and ESPN+, alongside the main broadcast.

Funday Football returned for 2024, this time being centered around The Simpsons. Presented during the Cincinnati Bengals-Dallas Cowboys Monday Night Football game on December 9, the broadcast called The Simpsons Funday Football featured an animated Atoms Stadium in Springfield, with all Bengals and Cowboys players being animated, and was centered around two of the show's main characters: Bart Simpson (voiced by Nancy Cartwright) and Homer Simpson (voiced by Dan Castellaneta). ESPN's Drew Carter returned to call Funday Football, this time being joined by NFL Live's Dan Orlovsky and Mina Kimes, with Lisa Simpson (voiced by Yeardley Smith) and Marge Simpson (voiced by Julie Kavner) roaming the sidelines and interviewing players during the game. Hank Azaria also contributed his voice acting work to the broadcast. Airing alongside the main broadcast on ESPN and ABC, as well as the Manningcast on ESPN2, this broadcast aired on Disney+ and ESPN+, with the latter simulcasting all broadcasts. The special also aired on NFL Network on December 10, and on Disney Channel, Disney XD and FX on December 11, FXX on December 13, and will be broadcast (live or taped) in more than 145 countries.

Funday Football returned for 2025, this time being centered around Monsters, Inc during the Philadelphia Eagles-Los Angeles Chargers Monday Night Football game on December 8, centered around the movie's main characters: Mike Wazowski (voiced by Billy Crystal) and James P. "Sulley" Sullivan (voiced by John Goodman), . Carter and Orlovsky returned to call the action, with Roz (voiced by Bob Peterson) serving as the sideline reporter, and Katie Feeney, ESPN's social media content creator, contributing through pre-produced segments. Chris Berman also appeared in a pregame segment. Alongside the main feed on ESPN and ABC, this edition of Funday Football was simulcast across ESPN2, Disney Channel, Disney XD, Disney+, and ESPN's direct-to-consumer streaming service through the ESPN app.

=== 2024 Monday Night Super Wild Card Game: Eagles vs. Buccaneers ===
For the third consecutive year, ESPN and ABC aired a Monday Night Super Wild Card Game and Megacast it across different Disney platforms. This year’s Megacast between the Eagles and Buccaneers went as follows:

- ESPN and ABC once again simulcast the game with the regular MNF team of Joe Buck, Troy Aikman, Lisa Salters, Laura Rutledge, and John Parry calling the game from Tampa.
- ESPN2 aired a special playoff edition of the "ManningCast", hosted by Peyton and Eli Manning, live from their homes.
- ESPN Deportes aired the game in Spanish.

All broadcasts were available on ESPN+, via the ESPN app, and NFL+.

=== 2025 Monday Night Wild Card Game: Vikings vs. Rams ===
Once again, ESPN and ABC's presentation of the Monday Night Wild Card Game (the NFL retired the "Super Wild Card" branding) aired across multiple Disney platforms. This year’s Megacast between the Vikings and Rams went as follows:

- ESPN and ABC once again simulcast the game with the regular MNF team of Joe Buck, Troy Aikman, Lisa Salters, Laura Rutledge, and Russell Yurk calling the game from Glendale, AZ. (Note: The game was moved from SoFi Stadium in Inglewood, CA to State Farm Stadium in Glendale, AZ due to the, at the time, ongoing Los Angeles wildfires)
- ESPN2 aired a special playoff edition of the "ManningCast", hosted by Peyton and Eli Manning, with an appearance from Bill Belichick, live from their homes.
- ESPN Deportes aired the game in Spanish.

All broadcasts were available on ESPN+, via the ESPN app, Disney+, for the first time, and NFL+.

=== MNF Playbook with Next Gen Stats ===
During Week 16 in the 2025 NFL season, ESPN launched an analytics-oriented broadcast for Monday Night Football known as MNF Playbook with Next Gen Stats. The broadcast features alternative commentary led by Field Yates and a rotation of analysts, incorporating augmented reality overlays with live statistics (including technology from TruPlayAI) and extended analysis of replays. MNF Playbook was produced for Week 16, 17, and 18, as well as the Wild Card and Divisional games on ABC; the broadcast initially aired on ESPN2 in lieu of MNF with Peyton & Eli while it was on hiatus, and moved to the ESPN app from Week 18 onward.

In October 2026, ESPN announced that the Playbook broadcasts would return for eight Monday Night Football games through the remainder of the 2026 NFL season, this time airing on NFL Network. The slate will also include Super Bowl LXI, notably marking NFL Network's first ever live broadcast of the Super Bowl.

=== 2026 NFL Playoffs ===
ESPN and ABC's NFL playoff coverage expanded to include more options across ESPN's platforms. This year’s Megacast options included:

- ESPN and ABC simulcasting the game feeds of both the Wild Card and Divisional games with the regular MNF team of Joe Buck, Troy Aikman, Lisa Salters, Laura Rutledge, and Russell Yurk calling both games.
- ESPN's direct-to-consumer streaming service (through the ESPN app) aired playoff versions of "NFL Playbook with Next Gen Stats" for both games.
- ESPN2 aired a special Wild Card edition of the "ManningCast", hosted by Peyton and Eli Manning, live from their homes.
- ESPN Deportes aired the game in Spanish.

All broadcasts were available on ESPN's direct-to-consumer streaming service, via the ESPN app, Disney+, and NFL+.

=== Future NFL Megacasts ===
To go along with ESPN's new deal with the NFL, the network can give some games the Megacast treatment, as the new deal will allow expanded rights for interactivity and alternate broadcasts. For example, these Megacasts can happen for the Super Bowl, which ABC will air. ABC and ESPN have confirmed plans for a Megacast for Super Bowl LXI in February 2027.

== ESPN FC Megacasts ==
=== 2017 Copa del Rey Semifinals and Final ===
From 2017 onwards, the enhanced Megacast feeds will be expanded to ESPN FC-branded broadcasts, starting with the Copa del Rey Semifinals and the Final.

== MLB Megacasts ==
=== MLB StatCast ===
With Major League Baseball partnering with at first Amazon Web Services, later Google Cloud to provide "next-gen stats", similar to the NFL's Next-Gen Stats program, ESPN teams up with MLB to air a Statcast broadcast for select MLB telecasts including Sunday Night Baseball, the Major League Baseball Home Run Derby, and the Major League Baseball Wild Card Game. These telecasts usually air on ESPN2. A revamped version of StatCast was launched during the 2024 season to replace the KayRod Cast.

=== KayRod Cast ===
In 2022, ESPN debuted the “KayRod Cast”, an alternate broadcast for Sunday Night Baseball with a similar approach to the “ManningCast”. This alternate broadcast featured Yankee broadcaster Michael Kay and former Yankee Alex Rodriguez, providing their own commentary, while also integrating fantasy baseball stats, analytical predictions, and special guests throughout the game. There were eight presentations of this MegaCast, with both men appearing from ESPN’s Seaport District studios. The KayRod cast ended after the 2023 season when Rodriguez signed an exclusive deal with Fox Sports.

=== MLB-Little League Classic KidsCast ===
For the 2021 MLB Little League Classic, the KidsCast was used for a game on August 24 at 7:30 ET. The KidsCast consists of kids selected from the Bruce Beck Sports Broadcasting Camp calling the game on ESPN2. The KidsCast for the MLB Little League Classic returned for 2022, 2023, 2024, and 2025 as well.

== NHL Megacasts ==
On March 10, 2021, ESPN announced a seven-year agreement with the National Hockey League to serve as one of its two rightsholders; ESPN networks will hold rights to the Stanley Cup Finals for four out of the next seven seasons, which will be aired on ABC exclusively. ESPN stated that the agreement would include the ability to air Megacast coverage with alternate feeds, as well as simulcast the games on ESPN+.

=== Star Watch ===
To coincide with the first meeting of the 2021-22 season between Sidney Crosby and Alex Ovechkin, on December 10, ESPN broke out the Megacast for the first time during the Penguins-Capitals matchup, with a “Star Watch” broadcast, featuring isolated cameras and individual stats on Crosby and Ovechkin. Both the game, and the Star Watch broadcast, were available on ESPN+, with the game also being simulcast on Hulu.

The Star Watch returned for the 2022-23 season with select games having this alternate broadcast throughout the season.

=== IceCast ===
For the remainder of ABC’s NHL schedule for the 2021-22 season, ESPN broke the Megacast seal for those games. Beginning with the Rangers-Penguins matchup, ESPN produced a separate “IceCast”, which allowed fans to see how plays develop from above the ice. Unlike previous Megacasts where a different set of announcers call the action, ESPN takes the game feed from ABC and applies it to the IceCast. Like the Star Watch broadcast, back in December, these live broadcasts, along with the ABC telecast, were available on ESPN+.

The IceCast returned during ESPN’s coverage of the 2022 Eastern Conference Finals, and then for ABC’s coverage of the 2022 Stanley Cup Finals, marking the first ever alternate broadcast for a Stanley Cup Finals.

=== All-12 ===
In a similar approach to the “All-22” alternate broadcast shown during college football games, ESPN experimented with an “All-12” broadcast during the 2023 NHL Stadium Series game on February 18 between the Washington Capitals and the Carolina Hurricanes at Carter-Finley Stadium, home of the NC State Wolfpack, which is located directly next door to the Hurricanes’ home arena, PNC Arena. This broadcast, focusing on all 12 players featured on the ice during the game, was broadcast on ESPN+, along with the traditional ABC broadcast.

=== Puck Possessor ===
In a similar approach to the FoxTrax glowing puck from the ‘90s, ESPN produced a “Puck Possessor” visual identifier alternate broadcast for select ABC games. This broadcast, that takes the main feed and focuses on who has the puck during games, is broadcast on ESPN+, along with the traditional ABC broadcast.

=== NHL animated altcasts ===
In a similar approach to Nickelodeon’s NFL broadcasts with the NFL and CBS Sports, ESPN presented a kid-friendly alternate animated broadcast of the March 14th game between the Washington Capitals and the New York Rangers, focused on the hit Disney Channel show Big City Greens. Dubbed the “NHL Big City Greens Classic”, this broadcast, which animated every player on a rink in the middle of Big City, and was called by ESPN’s Drew Carter and Kevin Weekes. Big City Greens cast members also chimed in throughout the broadcast. This broadcast was simulcast across Disney Channel, Disney XD, Disney+, and ESPN+, who also simulcast the traditional ESPN broadcast. This was the first ever live sports broadcast for both Disney Channel and Disney+, while this was the first live sports broadcast, other than the Pro Bowl Games, to air on Disney XD.

ESPN brought back the NHL Big City Greens Classic for the March 9, 2024 broadcast of that day's Pittsburgh Penguins-Boston Bruins game, the back half of an ABC Hockey Saturday doubleheader. Like the Capitals-Rangers game from a year prior, this broadcast was simulcast on Disney Channel, Disney XD, Disney+ and ESPN+, and featured the same real-time 3D animated perspective based on Big City Greens. Carter and Weekes returned to call the game with Arda Ocal joining the duo this year. Cast members from the show chimed in throughout the broadcast as well.

After a one-year absence, ESPN produced another animated NHL broadcast, this time featuring on the hit Disney and Pixar movie Inside Out. Broadcast during the April 5 game between the Washington Capitals and the New York Rangers, the game was played on "Hockey Island" inside of the mind of the movie's main character, Riley, and featured the same real-time 3D animated perspective as the Big City Greens Classic broadcasts. Carter, Weekes, and Ocal returned to call the game. Inside Out cast members also chimed in throughout the broadcast. This broadcast was simulcast across Disney Channel, Disney XD, and Disney+, alongside the main broadcast on ESPN and ESPN DTC.

=== OviCast ===
In recognition of Alex Ovechkin's chase of Wayne Gretzky's all-time goals record, ESPN put together an "OviCast" alternate viewing option of the Washington Capitals game against the Minnesota Wild on March 27. This alternate broadcast featured an isolated camera on Ovechkin and stat boxes showing his game stats and the number of goals away he was from the record. This alternate broadcast, which was available on ESPN+ alongside the main feed, was set to be featured alongside ESPN's remaining games featuring the Capitals, but was later scrapped after Ovechkin broke the record a week later on TNT, who also produced a similar alternate broadcast for sister channel truTV.

== 7Innings Live ==
In 2021 Women's College World Series, ESPNU aired an alternate broadcast of the Championship Series games with the 7Innings Live crew. This Megacast is unique because each game had a different theme, including a Disney-tourist themed broadcast. These altcasts continued in 2022, and were brought back in 2025 following a two-year hiatus.

== Little League KidsCast ==
For the 2019 Little League World Series, ESPN produced a special KidsCast version of select games, where kids selected from the Bruce Beck Sports Broadcasting Camp, call the action, along with former pitcher Mo'ne Davis. One game aired on ESPN, while one aired on ESPN2.

== Golf Megacasts ==
=== 2022 PGA Championship ===
For their coverage of the 2022 PGA Championship, ESPN, along with Omaha Productions, as part of the one-year extension of their MNF deal, produced a Manningcast-type alternate broadcast. This broadcast was hosted by Joe Buck, the new voice of Monday Night Football, and ESPN golf analyst Michael Collins, the host of “America’s Caddie” on ESPN+. Buck made his official ESPN debut during these broadcasts, which aired during all four days of the PGA.

Like the Manningcast, this broadcast featured a wide variety of special guests, including: Buck’s longtime broadcast partner and new MNF analyst Troy Aikman, Peyton and Eli Manning, Charles Barkley, ESPN NBA analyst Doris Burke, and Buffalo Bills quarterback Josh Allen, all providing commentary and conversation through live play.

Each broadcast aired for four hours each day. The first hour every day aired on ESPN, while the last three hours on Thursday and Friday shifted to ESPN2, and to ESPN+ on Saturday and Sunday.

=== 2023 PGA Championship ===
ESPN, along with Omaha Productions, brought back the PGA Championship alternate broadcast for 2023. However, this time, the alternate broadcast was hosted by Matt Barrie while Collins returned. The broadcast was retitled to "PGA Championship with Matty and the Caddie" to reflect the podcast hosted by Barrie and Collins.

Like the previous year, the broadcast followed the same format and aired for four hours each day. However, this year, ESPN aired the first two hours on Thursday and Friday, while the last two hours shifted to ESPN2. On Saturday and Sunday, the Matty and the Caddie broadcast aired for one hour on ESPN, then shifted to a separate alternate broadcast hosted by the "fanalysts" of the "No Laying Up" YouTube channel for the remaining three hours on ESPN+.
