= The V Show with Bob Valvano =

American sports radio talk show

- Genre: Sports talk
- Running time: 4 hours
- Country of origin: United States
- Home station: ESPN Radio (1998-)
- Starring: Bob Valvano
- Original release: 1998 – Present

The V Show with Bob Valvano is a sports talk radio show hosted by Bob Valvano and broadcast on ESPN Radio. Normally, the show is heard Saturdays and Sundays from 1am ET to 5am ET; however, in 2009, his Friday night shows were pre-empted, and his Saturday shows shortened by one hour, during football season, mainly by Mike Tirico's Weekend Blitz and Chris Mortensen's The Mort Report. Valvano has been on the same post since he joined ESPN Radio in December 1998. During the college basketball season he broadcasts from a different location almost every week, because he does a game for ESPN2 every Saturday night during the regular season. Two personalities that often replaced him were Jeff Rickard and Amy Lawrence, both were regulars on GameNight and ESPN Radio.

The ESPN Radio SportsCenter update anchor is Neil Jackson or as Bob calls him Neil "Action" Jackson. Jackson helps with trivia challenges, highlights and phone calls. Regular guests on the show include Rob Neyer of SB Nation, Ric Bucher of ESPN.com, Len Pasquarelli also of ESPN.com and "The Professor", John Clayton.

== Segments ==
- V Cap- This segment, which started in 2006, is at the end of each hour. It is similar to AllNight with Jason Smith's Around the Dial segment, in which Valvano along with Jackson run down all of the scores and highlights from all of the big games from that night.
- ESPN Radio Match Game- This segment is every weekend, usually at the start of the second half-hour of the first show; two callers (plus an alternate, who is declared the winner in case of a tie) each play one round of Match Game, three of the staffers and a (non-celebrity) phone-in panelist as the "celebrities". The winner gets a "fabulous prize" (which, whenever the term is used, is followed by someone mentioning, "Prize is not fabulous"; they also have a recording of Gilbert Gottfried saying it).
- 3 with V: This segment features Valvano going over the top three stories of the day and giving his thoughts on them.
- Clubhouse Cuisine- This segment is on periodically, when Valvano collects recipes from chefs and noted sports figures.
- Blind Stabs in the Dark- Each week during the NFL season, they take calls from listeners across the country and they pick an NFL game against the spread. If they win, their affiliate gets a point. In the past, affiliates from Canada have won more often. During the segment, the theme music of the Mr. Magoo cartoon series from the 1960s is played.
- Jimmy V Don't Ever Give Up Awards- These awards, which air periodically, was begun in 2006 and was named in honor of Bob's brother Jim Valvano. It recognizes the never give up attitude that has led to inspiring and remarkable achievements in all of sports from high school to the professionals.
- Interrogation- A game show segment that usually occurs in the first half-hour of the second show of the week. Bobby asks two contestants eight questions that are related in some way. Some questions are multiple choice, others are fill in the blanks, and others have an audio clue.
- V Stakes- Bob places bets on a horse race, which is then played; any winnings (or, if there were none, the amount that was bet) are donated to the V Foundation.
