= List of ESPN personalities =

Present television personalities on the ESPN network.

== Current ESPN personalities ==
=== Analysts ===
- Troy Aikman (2022–present): Monday Night Football
- Cory Alexander (2024–present): NBA on ESPN
- Eric Allen (2002–present): NFL Live
- Teddy Atlas (1998–present): Friday Night Fights
- Jon Barry (2006–present): NBA on ESPN
- Jay Bilas (1995–present): College GameDay (basketball), ESPN College Basketball and NBA on ESPN
- Aaron Boulding (2005–present): video game
- Doris Burke (2017–present): NBA on ESPN
- Ryan Callahan (2021-present): NHL on ESPN
- Cassie Campbell-Pascall (2021–present): NHL on ESPN
- Shams Charania (2024–present): NBA on ESPN
- Rick DiPietro (2021–present): NHL on ESPN
- Ray Ferraro (2002–2004, 2021–present): NHL on ESPN
- Fran Fraschilla (2004–present): ESPN College Basketball
- Rod Gilmore: ESPN College Football Friday Primetime
- Tim Hasselbeck (2008–present): NFL Live
- Kirk Herbstreit (1995–present): College GameDay (football) and ESPN Saturday Night Football on ABC
- Desmond Howard (2005–present): College GameDay (football)
- Richard Jefferson (2018–present): NBA on ESPN
- Quint Kessenich (1993–present): lacrosse and ESPN College Football and ESPN College Basketball
- Mel Kiper, Jr. (1984–present): NFL Draft and scouting
- Hilary Knight (2021–present): NHL on ESPN
- Tim Kurkjian (1998–present): Baseball Tonight
- Tim Legler (2000–present): NBA on ESPN, NBA Shootaround and NBA Fastbreak
- Trevor Matich: ESPN College Football
- Lon McEachern (1994–present): poker
- Greg McElroy (2015–present): ESPN College Football
- Patrick McEnroe (1995–present): tennis
- Steve McManaman (2010–present): soccer
- Mark Messier (2021–present): NHL on ESPN
- A. J. Mleczko (2021–present): NHL on ESPN
- Dominic Moore (2021–present): NHL on ESPN
- David Norrie: College Football on ABC and ESPN College Football
- Andy North (1992–present): golf
- Buster Olney (2003–present): Baseball Tonight
- Jesse Palmer: College Football on ABC and ESPN College Football Thursday Primetime
- Jeff Passan (2019—present): MLB
- Kendrick Perkins (2019–present): NBA on ESPN, NBA Today
- Derek Rae (1994–present): Champions League coverage
- Jordan Rodgers (2016–present): ESPN College Football
- Chris Russo (2022–present): First Take
- Nick Saban (2024–present): College GameDay (football)
- Adam Schefter (2009–present): NFL programming
- Peter Schrager (2025–present): NFL programming
- Chris Singleton: (2008–present): Baseball Tonight and Monday Night Baseball
- Marcus Spears: (2014–present): NFL Live, First Take
- Matt Stinchcomb: (2009–present): ESPNU College Football
- Bob Valvano: (1998–present): ESPN College Basketball
- Dick Vitale (1979–present): ESPN College Basketball
- Jay Walker: ESPNU College Football
- Andre Ware: (2003–present): ESPN College Football
- Kevin Weekes (2021–present): NHL on ESPN
- Stephanie White (2024–present): NBA on ESPN
- Jay Williams: (2003–present): ESPN College Basketball
- Damien Woody: (2011–present): NFL Live

=== Anchors ===
- John Anderson: 1999–present (SportsCenter)
- Victoria Arlen: 2021–present (SportsCenter)
- Malika Andrews: 2018–present (NBA Today, NBA Countdown)
- Chris Berman: 1979–present (SportsCenter, and NFL Primetime)
- Nicole Briscoe: 2008–present (SportsCenter host)
- John Buccigross: 1996–present (Baseball Tonight, ESPNews, NHL 2Night, SportsCenter, In The Crease, and The Point)
- Antonietta Collins: 2016–present (SportsCenter)
- Shae Peppler Cornette: 2022–present (SportsCenter)
- Kevin Connors: 2008–present (ESPNews, College Football Live and NFL Live)
- Brian Custer 2021–present (SportsCenter)
- Rece Davis: 1994–present (SportsCenter, College Football Live, College GameNight and College GameDay (football))
- Elle Duncan: 2016–present (SportsCenter)
- Chris Fowler: 1986–present (College GameDay (football)) and tennis
- Mike Greenberg: 1996–present (SportsCenter and Get Up!)
- Jay Harris: 2003–present (ESPNews and SportsCenter)
- Ernie Johnson Jr.: 2025–present (Inside the NBA)
- Jen Lada: 2015–present (SportsCenter and College Football Live)
- Steve Levy: 1993–present (SportsCenter and NHL on ESPN)
- Chris McKendry: 1996–present (SportsCenter and ESPNews)
- Sarina Morales: 2015–present (SportsCenter)
- Arda Ocal: 2016-present (SportsCenter, The Point, and In The Crease)
- Kelsey Riggs: 2021–present (SportsCenter)
- Hannah Storm: 2008–present (NBA Countdown and SportsCenter)

=== Commentators ===
- Mina Kimes: 2014–present (Around the Horn)
- Tony Kornheiser: 1997–present (co-host of Pardon the Interruption, and formerly Monday Night Football)
- Cam Newton 2024–present (First Take)
- Stephen A. Smith: 2003–present (First Take), (NBA Shootaround and formerly Quite Frankly with Stephen A. Smith)
- Michael Wilbon: 2001–present (co-host of Pardon the Interruption, and ESPN on ABC's NBA Countdown)

=== Play-by-play ===
- Mike Breen: 2003–present (NBA on ESPN coverage)
- Joe Buck: 2022–present Monday Night Football
- Brian Custer: 2021–present (ESPN CFB, ESPN College Basketball and NBA on ESPN)
- Ian Darke: 2010–present (MLS and World Cup coverage)
- Dave Pasch: 2003–present (NBA on ESPN coverage)
- Ryan Ruocco: 2013–present (NBA and WNBA coverage)
- Dan Shulman: 1995–present (MLB and college basketball play-by-play announcer)
- Joe Tessitore: 2003–present (boxing and college football coverage)
- Bob Wischusen: 2006–present (college football, college basketball, and NHL)

=== Reporters ===
- Shaun Assael: 1998–present (Outside the Lines reporter, E:60 reporter)
- Bonnie Bernstein: 1995–1998, 2006–present (SportsCenter correspondent, Wednesday Night Baseball, college football, NFL, substitute host for NFL Live and Jim Rome Is Burning, co-host The Michael Kay Show on 1050 ESPN Radio (New York))
- Georgie Bingham 2007–present (co-host of SportsCenter for ESPN non-domestic market and Soccernet SportsCenter)
- Chris Connelly: 2001–present (SportsCenter reporter)
- Jeff Darlington: 2016–present (SportsCenter NFL reporter)
- Dan Graziano: 2008–present (NFL Live, SportsCenter and Get Up)
- Gary Gerould 1980–present (NHRA coverage)
- Sal Paolantonio: 1995–present (SportsCenter reporter)
- Holly Rowe: 1995–present (college football sideline reporter, women's college basketball play-by-play)
- Lisa Salters: 2000–present (SportsCenter reporter, Monday Night Football sideline reporter)
- Jeremy Schaap: 1994–present (Outside the Lines host; SportsCenter and E:60 reporter)
- Shelley Smith: 1993–present (SportsCenter reporter)
- Rick Sutcliffe: 1998–present (MLB coverage)
- Scott Van Pelt: 2001–present (SportsCenter and golf coverage)
- Michael Wilbon: 2001–present (co-host of Pardon the Interruption)
- Darren Woodson: 2005–present (NFL Live)
- Katie George: 2019–present (college football sideline reporter, ACC Network and NBA on ESPN)

== See also ==
- List of ESPNews personalities
- List of ESPNU personalities
- List of ESPN Radio personalities
