= The Dan Patrick Show =

US radio and television sports talk show

- Genre: Sports talk
- Created by: Dan Patrick
- Directed by: Mario Miranda
- Presented by: Dan Patrick
- Starring: Todd Fritz; Dylan Grady; Paul Pabst; Marvin Prince; Raymond James; Andrew Perloff (2009–2021); Patrick "Seton" O'Connor (2007–2026)
- Opening theme: (Rock) Superstar by Cypress Hill
- Country of origin: United States
- Original language: English

Production
- Executive producers: Paul Pabst; Todd Fritz
- Production locations: Bristol, Connecticut (1999–2007); Milford, Connecticut (2007–present)
- Camera setup: Multi-camera
- Running time: 180 minutes
- Production companies: AT&T Sports Networks (2009–20); Content Factory (2007–09); ESPN Radio (1999–2007)

Original release
- Network: Terrestrial radio: Premiere Networks (2007–present); Fox Sports Radio (2009–present); ESPN Radio (1999–2007); Internet radio: Sirius: 214 (2015–18); XM: 203 (2015–18); SXM Online: 967 (2015–18); SiriusXM Sports Zone 92 (2014–15); SiriusXM 85 (2018–present); Television: Audience Network (2009–20); AT&T SportsNet (2010–20); NBCSN (2012–19, 2025-present); Fox Sports Net (2010–12); Streaming: B/R Live (2019–20); YouTube (2020); Peacock (2020–present)
- Release: September 13, 1999 – present

The Dan Patrick Show is a syndicated radio and television sports talk show, hosted by former ESPN personality Dan Patrick. It is currently produced by Patrick and is syndicated to radio stations by Premiere Radio Networks, within and independently of their Fox Sports Radio package. The three-hour program debuted on October 1, 2007. It is broadcast weekdays live beginning at 9:00 a.m. Eastern. The current show is a successor to the original Dan Patrick Show, which aired from 1999 to 2007 on ESPN Radio weekdays at 1:00 p.m. Eastern/10:00 a.m. Pacific.

The show was televised on three networks: on DirecTV's Audience Network (formerly the 101 Network) since August 3, 2009; on three AT&T SportsNet affiliates since October 25, 2010; and on B/R Live as of March 1, 2019. It can also be heard on SiriusXM Radio channel 211, and is distributed as a podcast by PodcastOne.

On January 10, 2020, Patrick announced on his show that the relationship with AT&T Sports for the live video broadcast would end in its current form, shortly after Super Bowl LIV. AT&T's Audience Network, which had simulcast the program since 2009, was ceasing operations, and the show would also end streaming via B/R Live, following a short-run that began in 2019. The final show under AT&T aired on February 28. On March 2, the live show began airing on The Dan Patrick Show YouTube channel with the radio show still being nationally syndicated via multiple platforms.

On August 10, 2020, it was announced that the show would move to Peacock on August 24, 2020. Highlights of the show continue to appear on the YouTube channel.

On July 19, 2023, Patrick announced that the show's run will end by the end of 2027.

Later on, it was announced that the show would end in February 2028, following the conclusion of Super Bowl LXII in Atlanta.

On November 13, 2025, It was reported that the show would be simulcasted on the relaunched NBCSN.

== Guests ==
The show mainly features guests involved with American football and sometimes other sports, whether current or former athletes, coaches, commissioners or agents. Less often, guests who are not affiliated with sports will come on the show, although it is common for Patrick to ask at least one sports related question. Guests typically appear when the sport they are involved with is in-season, but may also come on before the release of a movie or music album or when the guest is in the news. Few guests appear year-round and some may only appear once a year. Patrick has said that he welcomes anyone to come on the show who feels he has misrepresented or misquoted them.

The show has attracted high-profile guests, after heated or controversial events. Patrick rejects requests to restrict the questions asked, saying that doing this would only cheat his audience. There have been guests who have cancelled appearances due to Patrick's desire for candor. Current regular guests include reporters, broadcasters, and former professional coaches and athletes, most whom are current broadcasters working for a variety of media outlets, including Sports Illustrated, Yahoo! Sports, various network and cable stations, and reporters from local media sources covering the beat involving a team, player or league in the news at the time.

Patrick is known for his wry, irreverent interviews, often asking humorous hypothetical questions and occasionally, making bets with his guests. For example, in January 2006, Patrick made a bet with Arizona Cardinals' quarterback Kurt Warner, where if Warner got the Cardinals to the Super Bowl by 2008, then Patrick would personally campaign for Warner to be inducted into the Pro Football Hall of Fame. (Warner took Arizona to the Super Bowl in the 2008 NFL season, and would later be inducted into the Hall of Fame in 2017.) Another bet Patrick made was with the rap star Nelly, where Nelly said the St. Louis Rams would win the Super Bowl in 2007, while Patrick had the field. If Patrick won, he would get to name a song on Nelly's next album, and, if Nelly won, Patrick would have to appear in one of Nelly's music videos. St. Louis did not make the playoffs in 2007.

== ESPN Radio ==
The show was broadcast on ESPN Radio from 1999 to 2007; broadcasts originated in Bristol, Connecticut, during most of the year, and from New York City during the NBA season. The show debuted on September 13, 1999, and was heard weekdays from 1 pm ET to 4 pm ET. It was often viewed as the signature program on the network at the time, primarily because of Patrick's high-profile at ESPN/ABC and his ability to attract well-known and popular guests.

The show often broadcast live at the Super Bowl site, during the week before the big game, and during ESPN The Weekend at Orlando, Florida.

=== Supporting cast ===
The ESPN Radio SportsCenter anchor was long-time ESPN Radio personality Dan Davis. From 1999 to 2004, the show was co-hosted by former Cincinnati Reds pitcher Rob Dibble. During this time, ESPN NFL analyst Sean Salisbury was a regular third-man-in, though he was never given the title of co-host. Dibble left the show and went on to co-host The Best Damn Sports Show Period on Fox Sports Net (FSN) and weekends on Fox Sports Radio.

The show's producers were Ray Necci and Phil "The Showkiller" Ceppaglia. The latter earned the nickname while working for ESPN Radio's The Tony Kornheiser Show. After inadvertently giving Kornheiser the wrong name of a caller, Kornheiser was prompted to say that he was killing his show and the nickname stuck. Ceppaglia was also often made fun of by Patrick about the time he inadvertently hung up on former U.S. president Bill Clinton while working on Patrick's show.

During the 2 pm ET hour, Patrick was reunited with long-time SportsCenter co-anchor Keith Olbermann, marking the latter's return to ESPN, since his abrupt departure from the company in 1997. Olbermann appeared in 2004 and 2005 every Friday, then appeared daily starting in late 2005. Patrick would also preview what was coming up on the 6:00 p.m. ET edition of SportsCenter, while Olbermann previewed what was coming up on his MSNBC show, Countdown with Keith Olbermann. This hour was dubbed "The Big Show", which was the nickname previously given by the duo for their SportsCenter broadcasts.

=== Departure ===
On July 9, 2007, Patrick announced that he was leaving ESPN and its radio properties, on amicable terms. The last live edition of the Dan Patrick Show aired on August 17 of that year. However, earlier on July 12, the Chicago Sun-Times had reported that Patrick would continue in radio and launch a new nationally syndicated program via the Chicago-based Content Factory. From the date of that announcement, Patrick did not appear as host of that time slot, which was referred to by guest hosts as simply "ESPN Radio". ESPN announced Patrick would remain off-air from ESPN Radio until August 13, for his week-long farewell. He actually returned on August 15, and finished his final three broadcasts as his "Farewell for Now Tour" shows. During his final shows, clips from memorable interviews were played during the bumper music before each segment, and Dan encouraged listeners to visit his website (www.danpatrick.com) in order to keep up with him in the future. He signed off from his final show by thanking everyone involved with it as well as those who supported him throughout his TV work at ESPN. His concluding remarks were simply, "With that said, thank you. Goodbye... for now."

Guests who appeared on his final show included Bob Costas, MLB outfielder Ken Griffey Jr., former NFL players Jerry Rice and Joe Montana, and actor Will Ferrell, as Ron Burgundy.

== Radio, TV, and Internet ==
The Dan Patrick Show returned to the air on October 1, 2007; the show was produced by the Content Factory, with national sales and syndication handled by Premiere Networks. The program initially began on outlets owned by Clear Channel, but has since expanded to many more stations across the United States, both live and tape-delayed depending on the market. Eventually, the show was added to national radio when Fox Sports Radio used it to replace Out Of Bounds with Craig Shemon & James Washington on January 20, 2009. The show could be heard live on Sirius XM 247, a Fox Sports Radio simulcast. It used to be heard on a delayed basis on Sirius XM Sports Nation, which broadcast on both XM and Sirius. The show was removed the first week of January 2010, removing it from the Sirius platform entirely. The show is simulcast online at danpatrick.com, and live on the Fox Sports Radio site.

The show began simulcasting live on DirecTV's Audience Network (formerly The 101 Network) in August 2009. The show's web site was hosted by Sports Illustrated, for which Patrick still serves as a senior writer. In October 2009, the rights to the show were purchased from The Content Factory by DirecTV's sports division, DirecTV Sports Group, which now produces the show. Premiere continued its role as distributor.

As of October 25, 2010, the show began simulcasting on Fox Sports Net and Comcast Sports Net. The Comcast and Fox Sports Net broadcasts ended in July and on October 17, 2012, respectively, though DirecTV continued carrying the show on their Root Sports regional sports networks which formerly affiliated with FSN. After a short delay, the program began airing on NBC Sports Network on November 5, 2012. The show's airing on NBCSN was subject to preemption by other sporting events, especially the Tour de France in July. The NBCSN simulcast ended with the show of February 28, 2019, and resumed March 25, 2019 on AT&T-owned streaming service B/R Live. After Patrick's and Rich Eisen's shows were dropped by Audience as of February 28, 2020, both moved briefly to YouTube (with Eisen also simulcast on NBCSN), before Patrick moved again on August 24, 2020, to Comcast-owned streaming service Peacock, simulcasting on both services for a week before permanently settling with Peacock. (Eisen would follow that October.)

The main studio from which the show is broadcast is in Milford, Connecticut. Space above a then-Subway restaurant at River Street and New Haven Avenue in downtown Milford was converted into an elaborate clubhouse-style studio by DIY Network, as part of their "Man Caves" series hosted by former NFLer Tony Siragusa and DIY's Jason Cameron. The studio features several monitors, sports memorabilia, a basketball hoop, a pinball machine, a foosball table, a bar with 3 kegs and a golf simulator. The show had previously been produced in the attic of Patrick's home in the transition period from ESPN to Premiere. From September 2012 until the show's relationship with AT&T ended, the Monday show was broadcast from a studio in New York City during the NFL season. Patrick did this so he would not be as inconvenienced following Football Night in America's late ending on Sunday nights. As of 2015, with the move of all NBC Sports operations to Stamford including Football Night, the show mainly originates from Milford. On April 19, 2019, the show moved again to a larger location at 363 Naugatuck Avenue in Milford, which includes a basketball court and full kitchen.

Patrick often relates anecdotes of his ESPN career, in both positive and negative lights. He often refers to his former employer as "The Mother Ship" (he also used "ESPeon" in the show's early years), and expressed disappointment with their practice of preventing their talent from appearing as guests on his show, and frustration when an ESPN employee has agreed to come on the show only to later cancel. In the case of Erin Andrews appearing on the show, she later sent him a message and Patrick then stated on air that she had been told by ESPN she would no longer be available as a guest to the show. In response, Patrick has used the phrase, "if you're afraid, buy a dog", and on the rare occasion an ESPN employee does appear on the show, will say, "you don't own a dog." Michael Wilbon, co-host of Pardon the Interruption, is the only regular guest from ESPN, appearing a handful of times per year. Mike Golic and Chris Berman are the only other former colleagues to appear on the show since Patrick's departure from ESPN, appearing on set before the Super Bowls in 2010 and 2013, respectively. (Scott Van Pelt called in briefly on one occasion.) Whenever college basketball analyst Jay Bilas appears, it is while he is doing television commentary for CBS during March Madness. Other guests who have developed a relationship with Patrick over the years and served alongside Patrick while when both were at ESPN include baseball analyst Peter Gammons, whom Patrick affectionately refers to as "The Dalai Lama" for his tremendous insight of the game. Patrick will often mockingly speak to ESPN management directly while on air, in large part after discovering thoughts or news he has been able to divulge from guests appearing on his show are later found on ESPN programs or website, without giving credit or mentioning The Dan Patrick Show as their source. Patrick has stated on his show many times he is less forgiving when his former employer fails to give credit to guests who appear on his show regularly who might be in direct competition with ESPN, such as ProFootballTalk.com's Mike Florio, who might be the first to report on a story and later appear on The Dan Patrick Show but may be lesser-known than Patrick.

He also has remarked on their history of stealing news that is broken on his show, and having their own reporters "confirm" such news rather than directly attributing it to Patrick's show (this has caused him to coin the phrase, "We don't break news, we sprain news"). Despite mocking ESPN, he often speaks fondly of his former co-workers, both those appearing on and off the air.

== The Danettes ==
Patrick is joined on the air by the "Danettes": executive producer Paul Pabst ("Paulie"); executive producer Todd "LVD" Fritz ("Fritzy"); director of operations Patrick O'Connor ("Seton"); and board ops chief Marvin "Small Hands" Prince. Blogger/writer Andrew Perloff ("McLovin") is a former Danette. Patrick regularly chats with his crew about sports, and discussion will often break off into other topics, such as current events, entertainment, and their personal lives. The Danettes are generally encouraged to speak honestly and share their actual opinions, with Patrick often carrying on with them in a conversational manner. Patrick has acknowledged that he was influenced by Howard Stern when incorporating the members of his staff into the on-air aspects of the show.

In addition to their duties on the show, the Danettes have their own television program; The Box Score airs on DirecTV (in addition to being available online) and was carried on the NBC Sports Network until August 16, 2013, immediately following The Dan Patrick Show. The Box Score serves as a complementary program, recapping highlights from the day's show and further expanding on the behind-the-scenes elements of the program. The 30-minute program features the four Danettes and Casey Geraghty, who serves as the program's host. On November 27, 2013, Geraghty left The Box Score and the show was revamped and returned in early 2014. Dan Patrick himself is not a credited cast member, although he occasionally makes appearances or prerecords brief segments.

The term "Danette" was given to the crew by former NBA player Reggie Miller.

On December 3, 2021, Perloff announced he'd be leaving the show after nine years after having agreed to co-host an afternoon show on CBS Sports Radio alongside sportscaster Maggie Gray. It marked the first time in the show's history a Danette had left the show. His last show was on December 23, 2021.

Will Ferrell joined the Danettes for two days in August 2023 while the show was in Dublin.

On April 7, 2026, Seton announced he'd be leaving the radio show with his last show being April 10, 2026, having worked on the show since its beginning in 2007. He will be focusing on the digital side of the company and doing events to increase the social aspect of the show for the remainder of The Dan Patrick Show.

On August 29, 2026, Perloff returned to The Dan Patrick Show to announce that he would be co-hosting a new streaming show with Pabst called Not So Fast with Pabst and Perloff. The hour-long show will immediately follow The Dan Patrick Show on Peacock beginning on August 31st, 2026. As of August 29, Pabst is no longer a part of the final hour of The Dan Patrick Show, with behind-the-scenes crewmember Raymond James, known as "Big Day Ray" on the show, would be filling in as executive producer for the lone hour.

=== MVD ===
The "Most Valuable Danette" (MVD) award is a year-end honor typically bestowed upon the best-performing (or 'exceeding low expectations') member of the "Danettes" by Dan Patrick.

Year	Winner
2008	Patrick O'Connor ("Seton")
2009	Andrew Perloff ("McLovin”)
2010	Todd "LVD" Fritz ("Fritzy")
2011	Todd "LVD" Fritz ("Fritzy")
2012	Patrick O'Connor ("Seton")
2013	Patrick O'Connor ("Seton")
2014	Andrew Perloff ("McLovin”)
2015	Paul Pabst ("Paulie")
2016	Andrew Perloff ("McLovin”)
2017	Todd "LVD" Fritz (“Fritzy”)
2018	Ethan ("The 4th Danette")
2019	Ethan ("The 4th Danette")
2021	Todd "LVD" Fritz ("Fritzy")
2022	Todd "LVD" Fritz ("Fritzy")
2023	Patrick O'Connor ("Seton")
2024	Todd "LVD" Fritz ("Fritzy")
2025	Todd "LVD" Fritz ("Fritzy")

=== LVD ===
The Least Valuable Danette (LVD) award is a year-end honor typically bestowed upon the worst-performing member of the "Danettes" by Dan Patrick.

Year	Winner
2014	Todd "LVD" Fritz ("Fritzy")
2015	Todd "LVD" Fritz ("Fritzy")
2016	Andrew Perloff ("McHatin")
2017	Todd "LVD" Fritz ("Fritzy")
2018	Andrew Perloff ("McHatin")
2019	Andrew Perloff ("McHatin")
2021	Todd "LVD" Fritz ("Fritzy")
2022	Todd "LVD" Fritz ("Fritzy")
2023	Todd "LVD" Fritz ("Fritzy")
2024	Paul Pabst (“Paulie”)
2025	Todd "LVD" Fritz ("Fritzy")
