= Football Sunday on ESPN Radio =

- Other names: NFL on ESPN Radio (1993–2012)
- Genre: Sports talk
- Running time: 6.5 hours
- Country of origin: United States
- Language: English
- Home station: ESPN Radio
- TV adaptations: NFL on ESPN; NFL on ABC
- Starring: Jonathan Coachman; Eric Allen; Tim Hasselbeck; Tom Waddle
- Original release: September 6, 1993 – present
- No. of series: 34
- Audio format: Stereophonic sound
- Website: The NFL on ESPN

Football Sunday on ESPN Radio is a weekly radio program dedicated to the National Football League (NFL) aired every Sunday on ESPN and ESPN Radio. Jonathan Coachman is the show's host and the analysts are former defensive back Eric Allen, former NFL quarterback Tim Hasselbeck and former wide receiver Tom Waddle. The program broadcasts from ESPN headquarters in Bristol, Connecticut.

The host and analysts bring listeners NFL Sunday afternoon games. The program also provides the latest scores every ten minutes with Marc Kestecher on either the Scoreboard Update or ESPN Radio SportsCenter. After the games end, the hosts are joined by some of the players to talk about the games and give a preview of Sunday Night Football and Monday Night Football with important guests.

Former hosts of the program include Mike Tirico (1993–1996), Trey Wingo (2001–2003), Erik Kuselias (2004–2005), John Seibel (2006–2007), Ryen Russillo (2008–2009), Freddie Coleman (2010–2012) and Adnan Virk (2011–2012).

The series was historically known as the NFL on ESPN Radio until the 2013 season, even though the league never officially endorsed the broadcast.

== Play-by-play broadcasts ==
On May 21, 2013, ESPN Radio announced it would begin syndicating NFL games during the 2013 season. ESPN Radio entered into a contract with the New York Giants, New York Jets, New England Patriots and Miami Dolphins to syndicate select games out-of-market throughout the year. Play-by-play announcers for the broadcasts include Marc Kestecher, Sean McDonough, Bill Rosinski and Ryan Ruocco with Herm Edwards, Shaun O'Hara, Bill Polian and Damien Woody as analysts. As of the 2022 season, ESPN Radio covers Sunday afternoon NFL games nationally, alongside competing networks Sports USA, Compass Media and SiriusXM.
