= Sean McDonough =

American sportscaster (born 1962)

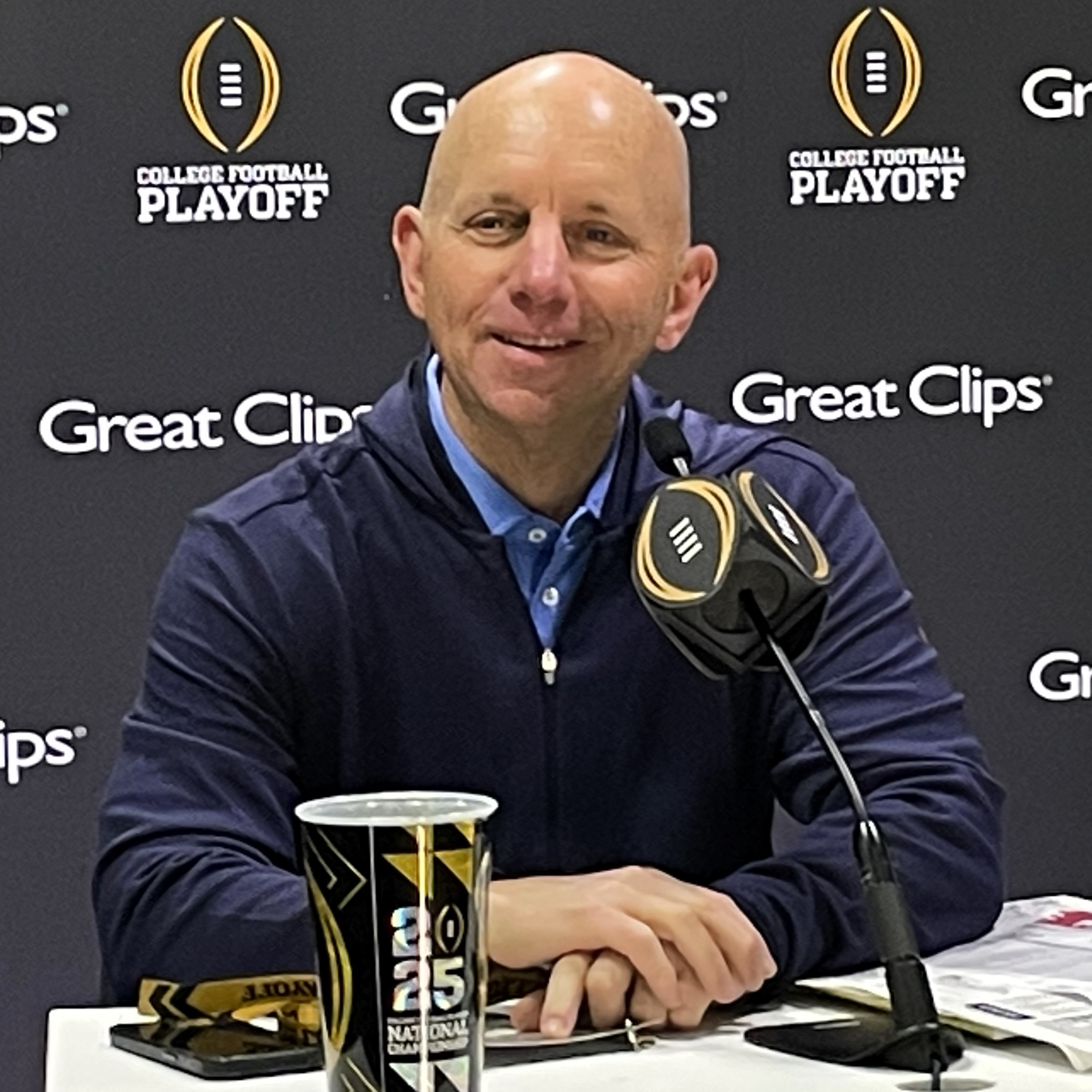
- McDonough in 2025
- Born: May 13, 1962 (age 64); Boston, Massachusetts, U.S.
- Education: Syracuse University
- Occupation: Sportscaster
- Employers: ABC; ESPN; Boston Red Sox

Sean McDonough (born May 13, 1962) is an American sportscaster, currently employed by The Walt Disney Company including ESPN and ABC and the WEEI Boston Red Sox Radio Network. McDonough has play-by-play experience for all four major professional sports leagues in the United States and Canada (NFL, NBA, MLB, and NHL).

== Early life ==
McDonough was born in Boston, Massachusetts, the son of Boston Globe sportswriter Will McDonough. He graduated from the S. I. Newhouse School of Public Communications of Syracuse University in 1984 with a degree in broadcast journalism. At Syracuse, he joined the WAER-FM sports department and provided play-by-play calls for Syracuse Chiefs baseball games. During college, he worked for Syracuse football coach Dick MacPherson.

== Career ==
=== Early career ===
McDonough was an intern at the short-lived Enterprise Radio Network in 1981.

It was in Syracuse where McDonough began his broadcasting career in 1982 as the play-by-play announcer for the Syracuse Chiefs of the International League. McDonough was also an Ivy League football announcer for PBS. He was a sideline reporter from 1984 to 1985 and a play-by-play announcer from 1986 to 1987.

=== Boston Red Sox and Boston Bruins ===
Four years after graduating from Syracuse, he began broadcasting Boston Red Sox games on WSBK-TV (Channel 38) in Boston with former Red Sox catcher Bob Montgomery and later former Red Sox second baseman Jerry Remy. While not calling Red Sox games, he also hosted select Boston Bruins games on WSBK-TV with the most notable game being the last game at the old Boston Garden (a pre-season game against their rival Montreal in 1995).

McDonough continued announcing broadcast Red Sox games through the 2004 season, moving over the years to various local stations, including WFXT (Channel 25), WABU (Channel 68), and WLVI (Channel 56). In 1996, he was teamed with Jerry Remy. He worked with Remy for nine seasons, ultimately only Friday night games, before being replaced in 2005 by NESN announcer Don Orsillo. McDonough attributed his firing to his salary and disputed talk that his "candor" was to blame.

He turned down an offer to become the New York Mets play-by-play man on television in 2005 before the Red Sox notified him that they would not pick up his option for 2005.

In 2019, McDonough returned to Red Sox broadcasts as a part-time play-by-play announcer on the team's radio network, announcing 30-32 games that season and becoming a permanent part-time announcer alongside Joe Castiglione, Will Flemming, and Lou Merloni in 2020.

=== CBS Sports ===
He began work for CBS Sports in 1990, where he broadcast college basketball (including 10 NCAA tournaments), college football (including the prestigious Orange Bowl game), the College World Series, the NFL, US Open tennis, three Winter Olympics (bobsled and luge in 1992 and 1994 and ice hockey in 1998), and golf (including four Masters and PGA Championships).

In December 1999, CBS Sports President Sean McManus informed McDonough that his contract would not be renewed. Once Dick Enberg, late of NBC was available, McDonough became the odd man out.

==== Major League Baseball on CBS ====
Outside of New England, he is probably best remembered for his time as CBS's lead baseball announcer, a role in which he was teamed with Tim McCarver. In 1992 at the age of 30, he became the youngest man to announce the national broadcast (and all nine innings of all of the games played) of the World Series. Coincidentally, that particular record would be broken four years later by Fox's 27-year-old Joe Buck, the son of the man McDonough replaced on CBS, Jack Buck.

Perhaps McDonough's most famous call is his emotional description of the Atlanta Braves' Francisco Cabrera (who had only 10 at-bats at the major league level that season) getting a dramatic, game-winning base hit in Game 7 of the 1992 National League Championship Series against the Pittsburgh Pirates:

Line-drive and a base-hit! Justice has scored the tying run, Bream to the plate...and he is SAFE! Safe at the plate! The Braves go to the World Series!

He also called the final play of the subsequent 1992 World Series, in which the Toronto Blue Jays became the first non-American based team to win the Major League Baseball's world championship:

Nixon bunts! Timlin on it! Throws to first . . . For the first time in history, the world championship banner will fly north of the border! The Toronto Blue Jays are baseball's best in 1992!

A year later, McDonough called Joe Carter's dramatic 1993 World Series ending home run off Mitch Williams of the Philadelphia Phillies:

Well-hit down the left-field line! Way back and GONE! Joe Carter with a three-run homer! The winners and still world champions, the Toronto Blue Jays!

Three years later, while calling the College World Series for CBS alongside Steve Garvey, McDonough called another series-clinching home run. This time, it was Warren Morris, who hit a two out, 9th inning walk-off home run that won the 1996 College World Series for the Louisiana State University Fighting Tigers against Miami.

Now Warren Morris...hits a deep drive down the right-field line, that ball is...GONE! LSU wins the College World Series on a home run by Morris!

==== NCAA Basketball on CBS ====
McDonough's other major endeavor at CBS was his coverage of the NCAA tournament with then-partner (and fellow Irish-American) Bill Raftery. McDonough and Raftery covered a number of regional finals in the 1990s before McDonough's run at CBS came to an end. The pair developed a terrific on-air rapport, thereby enabling them to spice up their broadcasts. Before the 1999 South Regional Final between Ohio State and St. John's from Knoxville, Tennessee, McDonough and Raftery donned fishing gear as they previewed the game from a boat on the Tennessee River, which was just outside the arena.

In 1998, McDonough—with Raftery at his side—called one of the great buzzer-beaters in NCAA Tournament history, as Connecticut defeated Washington in the East Regional semifinals on a last-second shot by Richard Hamilton.

Spreading the court for El-Amin. Ten seconds remaining. El-Amin, off to Voskuhl. He was pushed, the shot wouldn't drop...Hamilton, no! Another tip, no! Hamilton, at the buzzer, yes! Yes! Connecticut wins!

=== ABC/ESPN ===
Since 2000, McDonough has announced baseball, college basketball, college football, golf, NBA, NHL, and NCAA hockey for ESPN/ABC. Specifically, McDonough announced many Big East college football and basketball events. He has also contributed to ESPN's coverage of the U.S. Open and British Open golf tournaments, and called the 2010 NCAA Division I Men's Lacrosse Championship Final Four alongside Quint Kessenich.

McDonough called NCAA basketball play-by-play on March 12, 2009, on ESPN between UConn and Syracuse which went into 6 overtimes, becoming the longest game in Big East history, clocking 3 hours and 46 minutes. The final score was 127–117 in favor of Syracuse. Also on the broadcast was color commentary from Bill Raftery and Jay Bilas.

On September 28, 2011, McDonough called the nationally televised game in which the Baltimore Orioles came back to defeat the Boston Red Sox 4–3 after Boston closer Jonathan Papelbon came within one strike of closing the game. McDonough called Baltimore's Robert Andino's walk-off single, which occurred only three minutes before Evan Longoria's walk-off home run against the New York Yankees in St. Petersburg gave the Tampa Bay Rays, who trailed the Red Sox by nine games on September 3, the American League Wild Card, as follows:

Lined to left, Crawford playing shallow dives...cannot make the catch! Reimold comes to the plate! He scores! And the Baltimore Orioles stun the Boston Red Sox!

==== College football, the NFL, and the NHL ====
McDonough was also behind the mic for the fumbled punt in the final seconds of the Michigan State-Michigan football game on October 17, 2015, that resulted in the game-winning touchdown for the Spartans.

Whoa, he (Michigan punter Blake O'Neill) has trouble with the snap…and the ball is free! It's picked up by Michigan State's Jalen Watts-Jackson…and he scores! On the last play of the game! Unbelievable! (pauses while the team celebrates) Michigan State is still the big boy on the block in the state of Michigan. A shocking ending to this rivalry game.

Starting in 2013, McDonough started play-by-play work for the NFL on ESPN Radio. Others included Ryan Ruocco, Marc Kestecher, and Bill Rosinski, who previously did NFL games for NFL on Westwood One as the Atlanta Falcons and the Carolina Panthers.

McDonough was named the lead play-by-play announcer for Monday Night Football (succeeding Mike Tirico, who departed for NBC Sports) beginning in the 2016 season. In March 2018, ESPN announced that McDonough would be leaving Monday Night Football (to be succeeded by Steve Levy) and would return to announcing college football games.

On June 29, 2021, ESPN formally confirmed that he would be its lead play-by-play voice for their forthcoming NHL coverage beginning in the 2021–22 season, when the league returned to ESPN and ABC, after 16 years at NBC. He was reportedly interested in an NHL role ever since ESPN reacquired the rights to the NHL in March, and ESPN reportedly considered him and Steve Levy for the #1 play-by-play announcer role before eventually choosing him. He teams with up with former NHL center Ray Ferraro, and Emily Kaplan, who provides reports throughout the game, on the lead team. Previously, he teamed up with Brian Engblom on ESPN2 NHL broadcasts from 1993 to 2004. Initially, ESPN had McDonough and Ferraro together in the booth before the network decided to place Ferraro at ice-level.

On May 4, 2024, he called Game 7 of the Eastern Conference First Round series between the Boston Bruins and the Toronto Maple Leafs and he received praise for predicting the circumstance in which the overtime goal was scored immediately before it happened.

McDonough: At this juncture, Ray, anytime you have the opportunity, send it towards the net. So often, these overtime games end on a strange bounce or rebound.

Ferraro: Send it to the net and get people to the net.

McDonough: Lindholm right wing corner. Pastrnak is there. HE SCORES! David Pastrnak wins it for Boston!

=== Acting ===
McDonough acted in the 1992 film Mr. Baseball.

== Health ==
In 2012, McDonough had surgery for superior canal dehiscence syndrome which kept him from working for several months.

== Honors ==
In 2014, McDonough was named to the WAER Hall of Fame along with Bill Roth, Syracuse University's noncommercial radio station, where he began his sports broadcasting career as a student. S. I. Newhouse School of Public Communications also honored McDonough in July 2016 with the 4th annual Marty Glickman Award. In May 2007, he received an honorary Doctor of Humane Letters from Southern Vermont College.

In 2025, McDonough received the National Sports Media Association’s National Sportscaster of the Year Award.

== Career timeline ==
Year	Title	Role	Network
1988–2004; 2019–present	Boston Red Sox	Play-by-play	NESN/WEEI
1990–1999	College Basketball on CBS	Play-by-Play (secondary)	CBS
1991–1993	NFL on CBS	Play-by-Play (secondary)	CBS
1992–1993	MLB on CBS	Play-by-play (lead)	CBS
1993–1994; 1999–2000; 2002–2004; 2021–present	NHL on ESPN/NHL on ABC	Play-by-play	ESPN/ABC
1995–1999	College World Series	Play-by-play	CBS
1996–1999	College Football on CBS	Play-by-play (lead)	CBS
2000–present	ESPN College Basketball (ABC)	Play-by-play (secondary)	ESPN/ABC
2004–2015; 2018–present	ESPN College Football (ABC)	Play-by-play (secondary)	ESPN/ABC
2011–2012	MLB on ESPN (Monday Night Baseball)	Play-by-play	ESPN
2016–2017	NFL on ESPN (Monday Night Football)	Play-by-play (lead)	ESPN

=== Others ===
- 1992–1994: Bobsled and Luge in Winter Olympics Play-by-Play
- 1996–1999: Masters Tournament Hole Announcer
- 1998: Ice Hockey 1998 Winter Olympics Play-by-Play
- 2010–2011: NCAA Men's Lacrosse Championship Play-by-Play
- 2010–2014: U.S. Open Hole Announcer
- 2010–2015: British Open Hole Announcer

=== Radio ===
- 1982–1984: Syracuse Chiefs - Play-by-Play
- 2013–2015: NFL on ESPN Radio Play-by-Play
- 2019–present: Boston Red Sox – Play-by-Play

Preceded by Jack Buck	World Series network television play-by-play announcer 1992-1993	Succeeded by Bob Costas and Al Michaels
Preceded by Ned Martin	Boston Red Sox television play-by-play announcer 1988-2004	Succeeded by Don Orsillo
Preceded by Dick Lutsk	Boston College Eagles football play-by-play announcer 1995	Succeeded by Sean Grande
Preceded by Mike Tirico	Monday Night Football play-by-play announcer 2016-2017	Succeeded by Joe Tessitore
Preceded by Brad Nessler	Lead play-by-play announcer, ABC College Football; 2009–2015	Succeeded by Steve Levy
Preceded by Jack Buck	Lead play-by-play announcer, Major League Baseball Game of the Week; 1992–1993	Succeeded by Joe Buck (in 1996)
Preceded by Kenny Albert	American television Stanley Cup Finals play-by-play announcer 2022–present (alternating with TNT's Kenny Albert in even numbered years)	Succeeded by Incumbent
