= Ryen Russillo =

American sports journalist

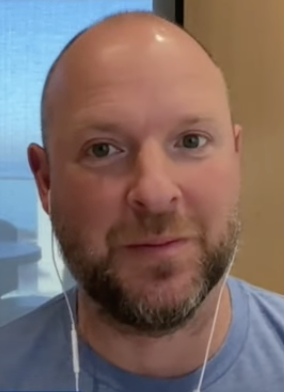
- Russillo in 2024
- Born: August 5, 1975 (age 51); West Memphis, Arkansas , U.S.
- Education: University of Vermont
- Occupation: Sportscaster
- Notable credit(s): The Ryen Russillo Show (2017); Russillo and Kanell (2015–2017); SVP & Russillo (2009–2015); ESPN Radio College GameDay (2008–2014); The NBA Today Podcast (2009–2012)
- Height: 6 ft 2 in (188 cm)
- Website: https://www.barstoolsports.com/shows/7778183/ryen-russillo-podcast/podcasts

Ryen Russillo (born August 5, 1975) is an American sports host who for many years hosted a popular radio show on ESPN. Russillo left ESPN in 2019 to join The Ringer. In fall of 2025, Russillo began his new position with Barstool Sports.

From 2009 to 2017, Russillo was a host or co-host of the afternoon show on ESPN Radio. From 2009 until 2015, Russillo co-hosted with Scott Van Pelt on what was originally titled The Scott Van Pelt Show and later became SVP & Russillo. The show was also briefly known as The Russillo Show following Van Pelt's departure but before Kanell joined. During the time that Danny Kanell was with the show, from 2015 to 2017, it was known as Russillo and Kanell.

== Early life and career beginnings ==
Russillo spent most of his childhood in Connecticut, before his family moved to West Tisbury, Massachusetts when he was a teenager. He has four younger siblings, all of whom have also gone into "non-traditional" jobs, including a metalsmith/jewelry maker and a musician. Russillo has previously praised his parents for encouraging his and his siblings' artistic exploration. He is a 1997 graduate of the University of Vermont, where he was a member of Sigma Alpha Epsilon and was also an intern at WCAX in Burlington. He was a play-by-play man for the Trenton Thunder for six months. Additionally, he spent a short amount of time living in Jamaica as a DJ, and spent several years working as a bartender while living in Boston.

Before moving to West Hartford, Connecticut in the late 2000s, Russillo lived in Boston, Massachusetts, where he hosted The Die Hards (mid-2003 to 2005) with co-hosts Anthony Pepe, Jon Anik, Kevin Winter, and Mike Winn while working for the Sporting News Radio affiliate WWZN. (Winter and Winn left the show relatively early on.)

Russillo did pre-game and post-game commentary for the New England Patriots on WBCN. He was let go after, and possibly as a result of, a personal conflict with John Dennis of WEEI, who had left him a threatening voicemail.

== ESPN and other work ==
Russillo hosted NBA Sunday, The Baseball Show, and ESPN Radio College GameDay during the 2008 season on ESPN Radio. He was also a regular host for GameNight and a fill-in host for The Doug Gottlieb Show and All Night with Jason Smith.

Sports Illustrated's Richard Deitsch named him Best Radio Voice of 2007 for his work on ESPN Radio. He praised Russillo's "reasoned approach and knowledge across sports."

He appeared regularly on several shows on Comcast Sportsnet New England, including New England Sports Tonight with Gary Tanguay and Greg Dickerson, and was also a studio analyst for the Boston Celtics' television coverage.

During the NBA season, Russillo was the host of ESPN's The NBA Today podcast, the network's #2 most downloaded podcast series. Contrary to popular belief, in December 2012, this show was not cancelled to be swapped out with NBA Lockdown featuring former NBA player Bruce Bowen.

In September 2015, Russillo welcomed former NFL player Danny Kanell as the new co-host for his Russillo Show, after Scott Van Pelt's departure from ESPN Radio. Kanell was laid off from ESPN in April 2017, leaving Russillo as the sole host again, with multiple guest co-hosts occasionally joining him on the show.

On December 20, 2017, Russillo announced he was leaving his ESPN radio show to pursue other opportunities, with his final radio show taking place on December 22. After departing his show, he continued to produce a podcast with ESPN and also made appearances across several ESPN platforms including on television with Get Up!. In late August 2018 he re-signed with ESPN.

In June 2019 Russillo re-united with old colleague Scott Van Pelt on the "SVP & Russillo" podcast.

On August 5, 2019, Russillo announced on his Twitter account that he would be leaving ESPN at the end of August and would be joining The Ringer as a full-time media personality.

At The Ringer, Russillo hosted The Ryen Russillo Podcast. Segments included NFL and NBA coverage, check ins with the MLB, and a Life Advice segment with Steve Ceruti and Kyle Crichton

Russillo began a new venture with Barstool Sports in October 2025, continuing his popular podcast. Beginning on January 12, 2026, the video version of his Barstool podcast began airing exclusively on Netflix.

== Personal life ==
Russillo is a 1993 graduate of Martha’s Vineyard Regional High School.

On August 23, 2017, Russillo was arrested in Wyoming for criminal entry, reportedly while nude and intoxicated. He was suspended by ESPN.
