= Ryan Ruocco =

American sportscaster (born 1986)

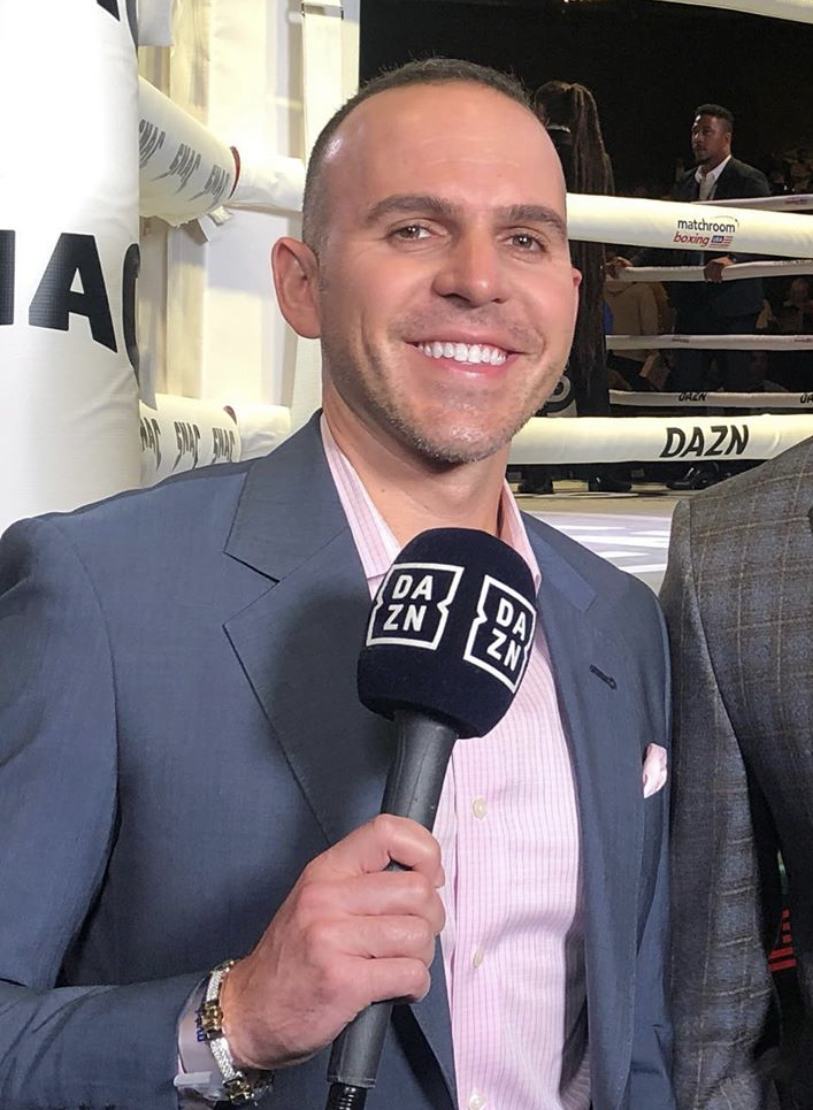
- Ruocco in 2019
- Born: November 18, 1986 (age 40); Fishkill, New York, U.S.
- Education: Loyola University Maryland (transferred), Fordham University (B.A. in Communications)
- Occupation: Sportscaster
- Years active: 2006–present
- Spouse: Andrea Ferzoco Ruocco (m. 2020)
- Children: 2
- Sports commentary career
- Teams: Brooklyn Nets; New York Yankees
- Genre: Play-by-play
- Sports: Basketball; Baseball
- Employer: ESPN, ESPN Radio, YES Network, DAZN

Ryan Ruocco (/ˈruːkoʊ/; born November 18, 1986) is an American television and radio sportscaster. He serves as a play-by-play announcer for the NBA, WNBA, and women's college basketball on ESPN, and the New York Yankees and Brooklyn Nets on YES Network. He previously hosted the podcast R2C2 with former Yankees all-star pitcher CC Sabathia as well as the Stephen A. Smith & Ryan Ruocco Show on ESPN Radio 98.7 FM.

== Early life and education ==
Ruocco is a native of Fishkill, New York. He is a graduate of Hackley School in Tarrytown, New York, and Fordham University.

As a student at Fordham, Ruocco called Rams football and basketball on WFUV.

== Career ==
=== ESPN ===
Ruocco serves as a lead television play-by-play broadcaster for the NBA, WNBA, and NCAA Women’s College Basketball on ESPN.

Ruocco began working for ESPN and ESPN New York 98.7 FM in 2008 as a contributor on The Michael Kay Show and as a substitute host on various ESPN Radio shows. He was a fill-in host prior to 2008 for ESPN Radio and anchored ESPN Radio SportsCenter and was a correspondent for the NFL Network. He also called college football and basketball games for ESPN Radio and also does play-by-play duties for The NFL on ESPN Radio beginning in 2013 with three other play-by-play men Marc Kestecher, Sean McDonough, and Bill Rosinski.

In 2020, Ruocco was the first play-by-play announcer to use the correct pronouns for New York Liberty star Layshia Clarendon, who is non-binary, when describing Clarendon’s baskets and rebounds, compelling a progressive and inclusive shift for gender norms in sports.

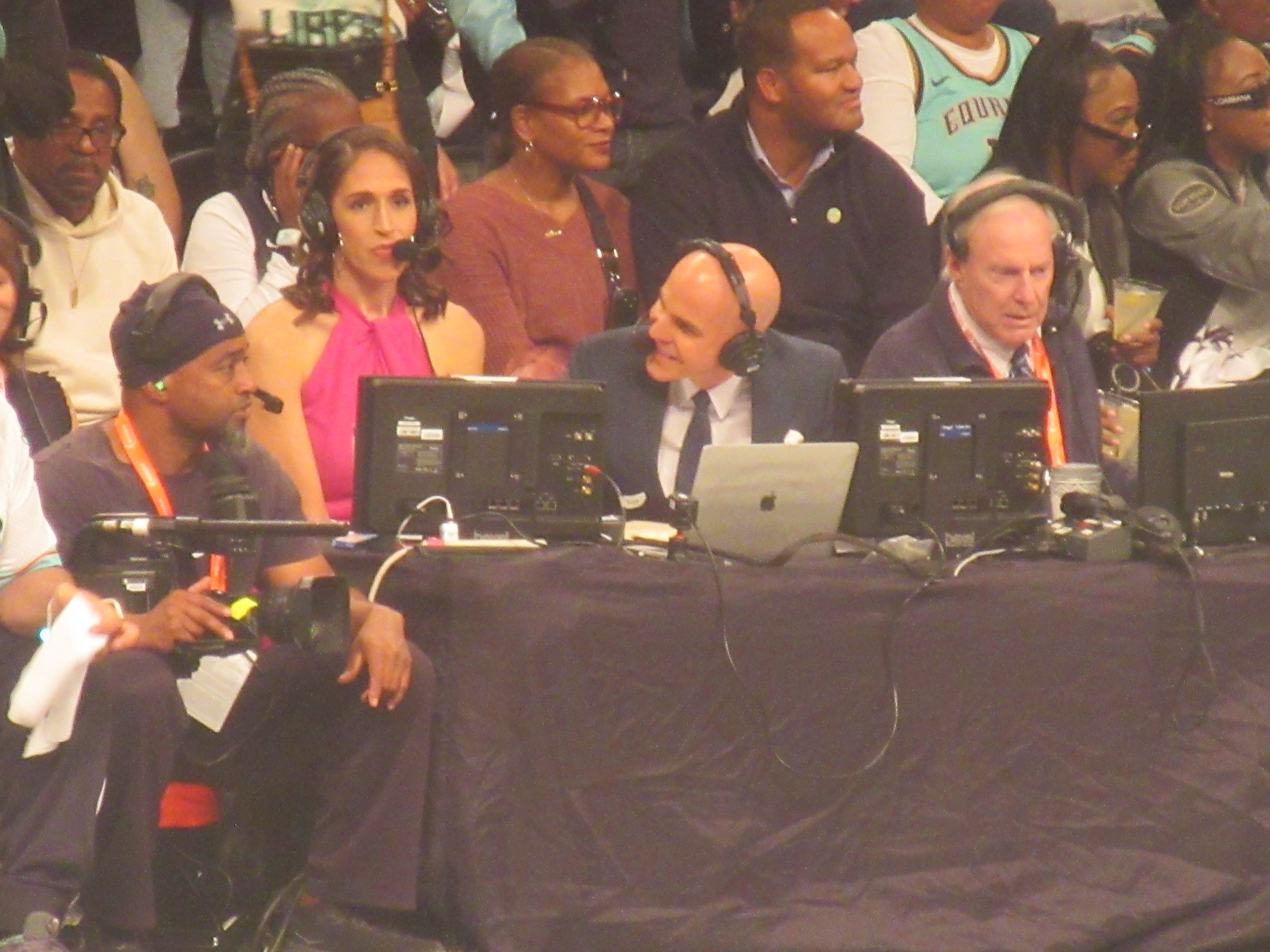
Calling Game 1 of the 2024 WNBA Finals for ESPN

In 2023, ESPN formed a second core NBA broadcast team for the 2023–24 season, with Ruocco as play-by-play and former NBA players Richard Jefferson and JJ Redick as analysts. The team would call the NBA Sunday Showcase series on ABC (replacing Mark Jones and Doris Burke), plus work together for other marquee events throughout the season and into the NBA playoffs.

=== YES Network ===
Ruocco (left) interviewing Anthony Rizzo at Yankee Stadium in 2022

Ruocco joined the YES Network in 2007 as the New York Yankees statistician. He is the secondary play-by-play television announcer for the Brooklyn Nets and New York Yankees. He joined the Nets broadcast team in 2011. He also does select college basketball games for YES and was the host of This Week in Football for the YES Network, which focused on the New York Giants and New York Jets. His analysts were Howard Cross, Gary Myers, and Ross Tucker.

Ruocco debuted as a lead play-by-play broadcaster for the YES Network when he called a series between the New York Yankees and Houston Astros in June 2015.

During the 2019 baseball season, Ruocco stepped up as the main voice of the New York Yankees on the YES Network. In addition to Ruocco’s regular slate of Yankees broadcasts, he took over for YES Network’s play-by-play broadcaster Michael Kay as he underwent vocal cord surgery. Ruocco also filled in for the legendary radio sportscaster John Sterling on WFAN in July 2019 when he took off his first radio broadcast after working 5,060 straight Yankees games since 1989.

=== R2C2 Podcast ===
Ruocco co-hosted the podcast R2C2 alongside former New York Yankees all-star pitcher CC Sabathia. Sabathia and Ruocco welcomed athlete and celebrity guests for wide-ranging conversations. In 2023, R2C2 held its final episode after six years.

== Personal life ==
Ruocco became engaged to private equity executive Andrea Ferzoco in January 2019; they were married in a private ceremony in November 2020, and Andrea gave birth to a daughter named Everly in September 2021. His son Remy James was born on June 14, 2025.

== Awards ==
- Liberace Award 2008
- Fish for Breakfast Nominee 2014
- New York Emmy Award, Best Live Sports Series (Brooklyn Nets) 2014
- New York Emmy Award, Sport Event/Game - Live/Unedited (New York Yankees) 2017
- New York Emmy Award Nominee 2017, Talent: Sports Play-by-Play
- New York Emmy Award Nominee 2018, Talent: Sports Play-by-Play
- New York Emmy Award Nominee 2019, Talent: Sports Play-by-Play
- New York Emmy Award, Best Live Sports Series (Brooklyn Nets) 2019
- New York Emmy Award Nominee 2021, Talent: Sports Play-by-Play
- New York Emmy Award Nominee 2022, Sports Program - Live, “Field of Dreams”
- New York Emmy Award Nominee 2023, Talent: Sports Play-by-Play
