= Dan Davis (broadcaster) =

American radio personality (1942–2026)

- Born: September 20, 1942
- Died: October 21, 2026 (aged 84)

Dan Davis (September 20, 1942 – October 21, 2026) was an American radio personality. He was an original broadcaster of ESPN Radio based in Bristol, Connecticut. Davis anchored the midday portion of ESPN Radio SportsCenter. His voice was often heard introducing various ESPN programs. He was also known as "The Duke", originated during his stint at the short-lived Enterprise Radio by Curt Chaplin, who is best known as the announcer for The People's Court.

== Before ESPN ==
Davis worked as a radio commentator for almost 30 years. He started his career in 1963 at WEMJ in Laconia, New Hampshire. In 1981 Davis worked at Enterprise Radio, the nation’s first all-sports satellite radio network. Davis did updates for Enterprise before it went off the air after only nine and a-half months. Apart from working for WEMJ, Davis also worked in Boston for ten seasons as the radio voice of Boston College football on a New England-wide network. Davis called the Boston College vs. Miami game in 1984, and his commentary of the famous Doug Flutie to Gerard Phelan touchdown pass remains among the favorites of Boston area sports fans.

== ESPN Radio ==
Davis joined ESPN Radio in January 1992. Davis was on The Tony Kornheiser Show between January 5, 1998, and March 26, 2004. When Davis reported the sports updates, the host, Tony Kornheiser, often interrupted Davis' reports with his own comments. Initially, Davis was shocked and not amused. However, later on Davis developed a very good chemistry with Kornheiser, and he even started to add humorous comments within his report to amuse (or annoy) Kornheiser. Davis and Kornheiser talking back and forth in this way prompted Kornheiser to say that The Duke was the glue of the show.

Throughout his tenure, Davis provided Sportcenter updates on ESPN Radio. Davis has also appeared on other programs. Sometimes, he made comments on Extra Point. He supplied his voice during the Week 10 edition of Mike & Mike's "Stone Cold Lead Pipe Locks" on November 7, 2008. On December 21, 2011, on Mike and Mike, it was announced that Davis was retiring from ESPN Radio, effective December 23.

== Personal life and death ==
Davis's hometown was Portland, Maine. He lived in Bristol, Connecticut, with his wife Annette. They had four children and two grandchildren.

Davis died on October 21, 2026, at the age of 84.

== See also ==
- List of ESPN Radio personalities
