= List of programs on ESPN Radio =

== Current shows ==
Program	Time	Date
SportsCenter AllNight	Mon-Sun 1 a.m.	2011–present
Unsportsmanlike with Evan, Canty and Michelle	Mon-Fri 6 a.m.	2023–present
The Golics	Mon-Fri 10 a.m.	2026–present
The Rich Eisen Show	Mon-Fri 12 p.m.	2025–present
Matt and Myron	Mon-Fri 3 p.m.	2026–present
Freddie and Harry	Mon-Fri 5 p.m.	2023–present
Amber & Ian	Mon-Fri 7 p.m.	2023–present
GameNight	Mon-Fri 9 p.m.	2023–present
Dari and Mel	Saturdays 7 a.m.	2009–present
College Tailgate	Saturdays 10 a.m.	
Best Week Ever	Sundays 7 a.m.	2016–present
GameDay	Sundays 1 p.m.	
Primetime	Sundays 4 p.m.	2020–present
GameNight	Sundays 10 p.m.	1992–present

=== Seasonal shows and Game Broadcasts ===
- ESPN Radio College GameDay
- College Football on ESPN Radio (2000–present)
  - Saturday afternoon games (ACC, Big 12 and the SEC programs only)
  - Saturday Night Football on ABC games only
  - Major bowl games
  - BCS National Championship (2000–2013)
  - College Football Playoff semifinal (2014–present)
  - College Football Playoff National Championship (2014–present)
- NFL on ESPN Radio (simulcast on television on ESPN2 as Football Sunday)
- NBA on ESPN Radio (1996–present)
  - Wednesday and Friday night doubleheader games on a weekly basis
  - NBA Saturday Primetime on ABC games
  - Christmas doubleheader games
  - MLK Day games
  - NBA All-Star Weekend festivities
  - NBA Playoffs
    - Selected conference first-round games
    - Eastern Conference semifinal and finals (even-numbered years)
    - Western Conference semifinal and finals (odd-numbered years)
  - NBA Finals
- Major League Baseball on ESPN Radio (1998–present)
  - Opening Night games
  - Saturday night games of the week
  - Sunday Night Baseball games
  - Jackie Robinson Day games
  - Little League Classic games
  - MLB at Field of Dreams games
  - Memorial Day, Juneteenth, Independence Day and Labor Day games
  - MLB All-Star Weekend festivities including the Home Run Derby and All-Star Game
  - MLB postseason
    - American League (odd-numbered years)
    - National League (even-numbered years)
  - World Series
- Operation Football
- Countdown to Kickoff
- Football Frenzy
- NBA Insiders
- Baseball Tonight
