= Bob Picozzi =

Bob Picozzi (born June 4, 1951) was a television and radio announcer who was employed by ESPN and Fox Sports as a play-by-play announcer for college football and basketball.

== Biography ==
Picozzi was born in Summit, New Jersey, and graduated from Seton Hall University. He graduated in 1968 from Notre Dame High School (Lawrenceville, New Jersey) and was inducted into the school's Athletic Hall of Fame and the WSOU (Seton Hall University) Hall of Fame.

In 1978, Picozzi began a 19-year stint at WTNH-TV as sports director. He was the TV play-by-play voice of UConn women's basketball from 1999-2012. He also called Atlantic 10 football for the Atlantic 10 Network and CAA football for Comcast SportsNet. Picozzi is a four-time winner of the Connecticut Sportscaster of the Year award and received one New England Regional Emmy Award. From 1998 to 2016, he was an ESPN Radio SportsCenter anchor and anchored 62,411 updates. Picozzi began calling college football and basketball for ESPN in 1997 and college basketball for Fox Sports in 2017.

== Career timeline ==
- 2017–2018 Fox Sports college basketball play-by-play announcer
- 1997–2017 ESPN college basketball and football play-by-play announcer
- 1998–2016 ESPN Radio SportsCenter anchor
- 1999–2012 Connecticut Huskies women's basketball TV play-by-play voice
- 2007-2011 Comcast SportsNet Coastal Athletic Association football tv play-by-play
- 1997-2006 (Atlantic 10 Network) Atlantic 10 football TV play-by-play
- 1978–1997 WTNH-TV sports director
- 1975-1978 (Fairfield Basketball Radio Network) Fairfield Stags men's basketball radio play-by-play
- 1973-1975 WNHC Yale Bulldogs men's basketball radio play-by-play
- 1969-1972 WSOU Seton Hall Pirates men's basketball radio play-by-play
