= ESPN Radio College GameDay =

ESPN Radio College Gameday is a talk radio show on ESPN Radio covering the day's college football games.

The show is produced every Saturday during the college football season from noon until 7 p.m. ET. Some programs originate from the ESPN studios in Bristol, Connecticut; others are on location from game sites, just like College GameDay on television. The show, which began in 2000, was originally hosted by Matt Schick and analysts Brad Edwards and Trevor Matich, former NFL player. The show is produced by Steve Coughlin. Students and fans are welcomed and encouraged to stop by and watch the games on several high-definition monitors, and possibly take home T-shirts or mini-footballs which are being distributed to the crowd. Beginning in 2006, the show offered a new segment in which a fan conducts inspections of tailgate sites near the broadcast location. This segment airs only when the show is on the road.

== Personalities ==
=== Current ===
- Braden Gall
- Trevor Matich: (analyst, 2007–present)

=== Former ===
- Chris Fowler: (host, 2000–2004)
- Kirk Herbstreit: (analyst, 2000–2004)
- Todd McShay: (analyst, 2005–2009)
- Dave Revsine: (host, 2005–2006)
- Gerry DiNardo: (analyst, 2005–2006)
- Scott Reiss: (host, 2007)
- Ryen Russillo: (host, 2008–2014)
- Doug Kezirian: (host, 2015–2017)

== See also ==
- College GameDay (football)
