= Erik Kuselias =

American lawyer

- Born: Hamden, Connecticut, U.S.
- Education: University of Michigan Law School; Brown University
- Occupations: Television and Radio personality

Erik Kuselias is an American television and radio personality and host who currently works for CBS Sports, where he hosts “Sportsline” (the network's show on sports wagering) and CBS Sports HQ.

== Education/Upbringing ==
Kuselias was born (and currently resides) in Hamden, CT. He attended Hamden High School, where he was a quarterback and two-time all-state baseball player. He was recruited to play both sports and attended Brown University, where he double-majored with honors. After college, Kuselias attended the University of Michigan Law School. After law school, Kuselias was admitted to Columbia University's school of Journalism, where he received his master's degree and did his PhD studies.

== Career ==
In 2003 while he was practicing law, Kuselias and his brother started a sports talk show, “The Sports Brothers”, that aired for one hour per week. Later that year, Kuselias was hired by ESPN and “The Sports Brothers” became ESPN's national afternoon drive-time program. In 2005 the show was rebranded “The Erik Kuselias Show” and became the fastest-growing sports talk radio show in the nation, ultimately reaching over 400 stations.

In 2007, ESPN tapped Kuselias to host its new daily TV show, NASCAR Now, which was nominated for an Emmy for “Best studio show” that year. However, in 2008, Kuselias left NASCAR Now and created and starred in “Fantasy Football Now”, which won an Emmy in Kuselias's first year. Additionally, he went back to radio full-time and appeared on a variety of ESPN TV programs, including “Mike & Mike in the Morning”, “College Football Live”, “NFL Live”, and “SportsCenter”.

In 2011, Kuselias left ESPN to join the Golf Channel, where he started and hosted “Morning Drive”. In 2012, he was promoted to NBC Sports, where he hosted "ProFootball Talk" with Mike Florio, and "Fantasy Football Talk". On August 4, 2012, NBC announced that it was launching the NBC Sports Radio Network, and its flagship morning show would be the “Erik Kuselias Show”. Kuselias did TV and radio at NBC until 2016 when he partnered with Genesis Communications to broadcast “The Erik Kuselias show” on radio.

In 2018, Kuselias was hired by CBS Sports, where he currently works.

== Personal life ==
From 2001 to 2012 he was married to Kristen Kuselias. In 2011, Kuselias began a 7-year relationship with TV host/fitness model Holly Sonders that ended in divorce in 2016. Kuselias has two sons (Erik and Troy)
