= AllNight with Jason Smith =

- Other names: AllNight with Todd Wright (1996-2005)
- Genre: Sports talk
- Running time: 4 hours (1 a.m. – 5 a.m. ET)
- Country of origin: (United States) USA
- Home station: ESPN Radio (1996-2011)
- Starring: Jason Smith
- Original release: 1996 – 2011
- Website: AllNight with Jason Smith

AllNight with Jason Smith was a syndicated sports talk radio show on ESPN Radio, hosted by Jason Smith. The show was heard Sunday through Thursday from 10 p.m. PT to 1 a.m. PT live from the studios of KSPN in Los Angeles, California, rather than the ESPN Headquarters in Bristol, Connecticut. Smith was named host of the show on September 19, 2005, after former host Todd Wright was fired after almost eight years on the show. It reached more than 500 ESPN affiliate markets across the United States and Canada.

AllNight with Jason Smith was syndicated on WEEI Sports Radio Network.

On September 14, 2011; Smith announced that he is leaving ESPN Radio. Rumors suggested he was leaving to take a job as a reporter on the MLB Network, which Smith refuted with the help of dramatic soundbites. His producer, Ali Bronson, also dispelled rumors about her taking over the show, or the show hiring former Green Bay Packers, New York Jets and Minnesota Vikings quarterback Brett Favre. On his last show, taking place on September 16, 2011 he announced that he would move to the NFL Network, and would start the following Sunday. Smith has since returned to radio, hosting a weeknight show for rival Fox Sports Radio.

== Guest hosts ==
Mike Salk and Amy Lawrence were two frequent guest hosts for AllNight. Smith himself was a guest host on The Herd with Colin Cowherd, The Scott Van Pelt Show, Jim Rome is Burning, and The Doug Gottlieb Show.
