= Jeff Rickard =

American sports broadcaster

- Education: Colorado Mesa University (Broadcast Journalism)
- Occupations: Sports broadcaster, radio host, program director
- Employer: Emmis Communications
- Known for: Host on ESPN Radio’s GameNight, Sirius XM sports channels, WFNI's Fan Morning Show

Jeff Rickard is an American sports broadcaster and radio host. He serves as Program Director and morning show host at Emmis Communications’ all-sports radio stationWFNI, in Indianapolis, Indiana.

== Career ==
Rickard started with Emmis as a part-time host and programming advisor before being tapped to take over programming duties full time in August of 2018. Along with former Colts’ lineman and veteran radio host Joe Staysniak, Rickard began hosting the Fan Morning Show in May 2019.

Since Rickard became program director, WFNI’s ratings share increased, and the station ranked highly among men aged 25–54 in the Winter 2021 Nielsen ratings.

Rickard contributed to both radio and television programs. He worked on a nightly, half-hour news, highlight, and talk show for Comcast’s CN8 network, a regional cable service that was later shut down.

Prior to joining WFNI, Rickard has hosted shows regularly on a number of Sirius XM’s sports channels, including NFL Radio, ESPNU, MLB Network Radio, Mad Dog Sports Radio and Fantasy Sports radio. He has served as the host of NFL Radio’s “The Sunday Kickoff” during the NFL season for the past five years and is the host of College Football Overtime on ESPNU.

Jeff was also the radio host on ESPN Radio’s Gamenight, along with Doug Gottlieb, Freddie Coleman and John Seibel where the team covered nightly sports action, discussed high profile issues and interviewed the biggest names in sports. Prior to his stint at ESPN Radio, Rickard hosted his own daily show on Sporting News Radio as part of a lineup that included James Brown, Tim Brando, and Bruce Murray.

Rickard’s first major programming job came in Salt Lake City where he led KKFN to consistent ratings and revenue success. The station was the radio home of the Utah Jazz and Jeff served as the team’s radio studio host for road games and the television studio host for the final three years of the Jazz’ Stockton and Malone era.

He went to Salt Lake City after working in his hometown of Denver as a morning show host Monday through Fridays while performing as the studio host for both the Denver Nuggets and Colorado Avalanche.

Rickard has done play-by-play for college football and basketball on Fox Sports Rocky Mountain, MLS soccer for the Colorado Rapids, was the voice of WNBA’s Utah Starzz, and worked with countless other entities on the professional, collegiate and amateur level.

In 2014, Rickard was given the Distinguished Alumni award by Colorado Mesa University where he had studied Broadcast Journalism while also playing on the football team.

Jeff has also been recognized by Richard Deitsch of SI.com as a “national radio personality of the year” in both 2006 and 2007.

Rickard attended Mesa State College in 1985 where he was a member of the football team that played for two NAIA championships. He resides in Indiana with his wife and his two sons.
