= Marc Kestecher =

American sports commentator

- Born: Marc David Kestecher; March 22, 1968 (age 58); Guilderland, New York, U.S.
- Education: Syracuse University
- Occupation: Sports announcer

Marc David Kestecher (born March 22, 1968) is an American play-by-play announcer radio sports and news anchor.

== Early life and education ==
He was raised in Guilderland, New York and attended Syracuse University.

== Career ==
Kestecher began his career with play-by-play work for the Albany Patroons. He later took studio positions at WKNR in Cleveland and WPTR (AM) and WROW in Albany, New York where he provided score updates and hosted talk programming. Kestecher joined ESPN Radio in 1999, first hosting ESPN Radio SportsCenter and studio coverage of major sporting events.

He was named as the lead play-by-play announcer for the NBA on ESPN Radio in 2016, replacing Kevin Calabro who opted to return to the Pacific Northwest to call play-by-play for the Portland Trail Blazers. In this role he calls the NBA playoffs and NBA Finals with PJ Carlesimo. Kestecher also does play-by-play for college football games and Football Sunday on ESPN Radio. In addition to his radio work, he has also done play-by-play for ESPN's coverage of the NCAA Division I women's basketball tournament and select NBA on ESPN games when the main staff has other commitments, and college football games for Group of 5 conference games on ESPNU.
