= ESPN Radio SportsCenter =

News segment on ESPN Radio

ESPN Radio SportsCenter is a news recap segment on ESPN Radio that airs during talk programming and sometimes live games coverage, usually by separate anchors. There are two updates an hour, at the top and bottom of each hour.

== Background ==
ESPN Radio's marquee segment lasts between one minute and two and a half minutes (depending on time of day) and includes scores, stats, news and sound bites. During the updates, the SportsCenter theme music plays throughout. ESPN Radio SportsCenter is heard during marquee programs such as Greeny with Mike Greenberg. It is also heard every twenty minutes during MLB and NBA broadcasts on ESPN Radio. It can also be heard on certain EA Sports video games that include ESPN integration. The updates can be accessed on demand using the ESPN mobile app.

The morning ESPN Radio SportsCenter anchors were Bob Picozzi and Christine Lisi. As of August 30, 2010, Mike Greenberg anchored the updates during Mike and Mike leaving to do Get Up! on ESPN in 2018. Dan Davis, who is an ESPN Radio original broadcaster, controlled the midday updates, while Marc Kestecher and formerly Jon Stashower were there in the evening. The late night crew usually switched between Neil Jackson and Jay Reynolds. Most of the ESPN Radio SportsCenter anchors also have other assignments from ESPN; for instance, Bob Picozzi also did play-by-play for Big East basketball on ESPN and Fox.

== Schedule ==
=== Monday-Friday ===
Eastern	Pacific	Update Anchor	Programs
1 a.m.	10 p.m.	Jay Reynolds (Mondays-Wednesdays), Jim Basquil (most Thursdays-Fridays), Chris Lewis (occasionally), Judson Richards (occasionally), Nick DeLuca (occasionally), Chris Burnette (occasionally)	SportsCenter AllNight
6 a.m.	3 a.m.	Max Kellerman (formerly)	Unsportsmanlike with Evan, Canty and Michelle (since September 2023) formerly: Keyshawn, JWill and Max
10 a.m.	7 a.m.	Christine Lisi, Doug Brown (formerly)	The Golics (since August 2026) formerly: Clinton & Friends; Greeny
12 p.m.	9 a.m.	Christine Lisi, Doug Brown (formerly)	The Rich Eisen Show (since September 2025) formerly: Carlin vs. Joe; Bart and Hahn
3 p.m.	12 p.m.	Christine Lisi, Doug Brown (formerly), Steve Lenox (formerly), Kevin Winter (formerly)	Matt & Myron (since August 2026) formerly: Freddie and Harry; Canty and Carlin
5 p.m.	2 p.m.	Christine Lisi, Doug Brown (formerly), Steve Lenox (formerly), Kevin Winter (formerly)	Freddie and Harry (Note: Since August 2026; previously, Freddie and Harry aired for 4 hours from 3 p.m. ET to 7 p.m. ET.)
8 p.m.	5 p.m.	Christine Lisi, Nick DeLuca, John Ryder (occasionally), Ed Benkin (occasionally), Jim Basquil (formerly), Doug Brown (formerly), Steve Lenox (formerly), Kevin Winter (formerly)	Amber & Ian (Note: Since August 2026; previously, Amber & Ian aired starting at 7 p.m. ET.) (formerly: Spain and Fitz)
10 p.m.	7 p.m.	Qiant "Q" Myers, Mia O'Brien, Jim Basquil (formerly), Doug Brown (formerly), Nick DeLuca (formerly), Steve Lenox (formerly), John Ryder (formerly), Kevin Winter (formerly)	GameNight (Note: Since August 2026; previously, GameNight aired starting at 9 p.m. ET.) (formerly: Freddie and Fitzsimmons)

== See also ==
- List of ESPN Radio personalities
