= Arena Football League on ABC =

- Genre: American football telecasts
- Starring: Mike Adamle; Ray Bentley; Sherdrick Bonner; Tim Brant; Ed Cunningham; Gary Danielson; Mike Gleason; Mike Golic; Mike Greenberg; Merril Hoge; Brent Musburger; Lynn Swann; Stan Verrett; Marcellus Wiley; Bob Wischusen; Ari Wolfe
- Country of origin: United States
- Original language: English
- No. of seasons: 6

Production
- Camera setup: Multi-camera
- Running time: 180 minutes or until end of game
- Production companies: ABC Sports; ESPN

Original release
- Release: August 23, 1998 – August 18, 2002
- Release: March 4, 2007 – July 27, 2008

Related
- Arena Football League on ESPN; Wide World of Sports

Arena Football League on ABC was the de facto title for broadcasts of Arena Football League (AFL) games on the American Broadcasting Company (ABC) television network. ABC was the first major television network in the United States to give exposure to the Arena Football League. Prior to 1998, when ABC televised ArenaBowl XII, the most exposure that the league would receive was on ESPN, which would air tape-delayed games, often well after midnight.

== Background ==
ABC's coverage of the AFL was usually relegated to solely the annual championship game, the ArenaBowl. From 1998-2002, ABC's ArenaBowl broadcasts were aired as under the Wide World of Sports anthology umbrella.

Following a four-year spell with NBC, coverage of the AFL would resume on ABC in 2007. As part of a five-year deal with sister network ESPN, a minimum of 17 regular-season games and nine playoff games—including a minimum of three Wild Card games were televised. Also televised were three Divisional Playoff games, both Conference Championships and the ArenaBowl on ESPN, ESPN2 and ABC. To clarify, both the 2007 season opener and ArenaBowl were on ABC, where three wild card games, two divisional games and one conference championship were on ESPN and the seventeen regular season Monday night games, one wild card game, two divisional games and one conference championship game was all on ESPN2. This particular arrangement with ABC was again in place in 2008 before NFL Network took over the broadcasting rights for the ArenaBowl for the next three seasons.

In 2017, the ArenaBowl was televised by WPVI-TV, ABC's owned-and-operated station in Philadelphia. The game was also streamed on Twitter and AFLNow, the league's streaming service.

== Commentators ==
- Mike Adamle (play-by-play, 1998)
- Ray Bentley (color commentator, 2008)
- Sherdrick Bonner (color commentator, 2017)
- Tim Brant (play-by-play, 2002)
- Ed Cunningham (color commentator, 2000 & 2002)
- Gary Danielson (color commentator)
- Mike Gleason (play-by-play, 1999–2000)
- Mike Golic (color commentator, 2007)
- Mike Greenberg (play-by-play, 2007)
- Merril Hoge (color commentator, 1998–1999)
- Brent Musburger (play-by-play, 2001)
- Lynn Swann (sideline reporter, 2001–2002)
- Stan Verrett (sideline reporter, 2007)
- Marcellus Wiley (sideline reporter, 2007)
- Bob Wischusen (play-by-play, 2008)
- Ari Wolfe (play-by-play, 2017)

== See also ==
- List of events broadcast on Wide World of Sports (American TV program)
