= Golić =

Golić is a Bosnian, Serbian and Croatian surname. Notable people with the name include:

- Andrej Golic (born 1974), Bosnian-French handball player
- Biljana Golić (born 1977), Serbian tennis player
- Bob Golic (1931–2013), Canadian football player
- Bob Golic (born 1957), American football player
- Jovan Golić (born 1986), Bosnian footballer
- Mike Golic (born 1962), American football player and television host
- Mike Golic Jr. (born 1989), American football player and television host
- Nebojša Golić (born 1977), Bosnian-Serbian handball player
- Slađana Golić (born 1960), Bosnian basketball player
- Srebrenka Golić (born 1958), Bosnian politician
