= 2015 NBA All-Star Game =

Exhibition basketball game

	1	2	3	4	Total
West	47	36	39	41	163
East	36	46	40	36	158
- Date: February 15, 2015
- Arena: Madison Square Garden (All-Star Game); Barclays Center (All-Star Saturday Night)
- City: New York City
- MVP: Russell Westbrook (West)
- National anthem: Queen Latifah (American); Tamia (Canadian)
- Halftime show: Ariana Grande and Nicki Minaj
- Attendance: 17,198
- Network: TNT, TBS (United States); TSN (Canada)
- Announcers: Marv Albert, Reggie Miller and Chris Webber; Kevin Harlan, Reggie Miller and Kenny Smith (All-Star Saturday Night); Matt Winer, Grant Hill and Chris Webber (Rising Stars Challenge)

NBA All-Star Game
< 2014	2016 >

The 2015 NBA All-Star Game was an exhibition basketball game that was played on February 15, 2015, during the National Basketball Association's (NBA) 2014–15 season. It was the 64th edition of the NBA All-Star Game, and was played at Madison Square Garden in New York City. The Western Conference defeated the Eastern Conference, 163–158. Russell Westbrook was named the All-Star Game Most Valuable Player. The game was televised nationally by TNT and TBS in the United States, and TSN in Canada.

The All-Star Weekend festivities were jointly hosted by the league's two New York City teams, the New York Knicks and the Brooklyn Nets. The NBA awarded the game to New York City in 2013, and the logo for the 2015 All-Star Game was unveiled on July 10, 2014. The All-Star Game itself was played at the Knicks' home arena, Madison Square Garden; the current Garden last hosted the game in 1998, and the Knicks' previous home, the third Madison Square Garden, hosted three earlier All-Star Games. The Saturday All-Star activities were held at the Nets' home arena, the Barclays Center; the Nets previously hosted the 1982 All-Star Game at Brendan Byrne Arena in East Rutherford, New Jersey.

== All-Star Game ==
=== Coaches ===
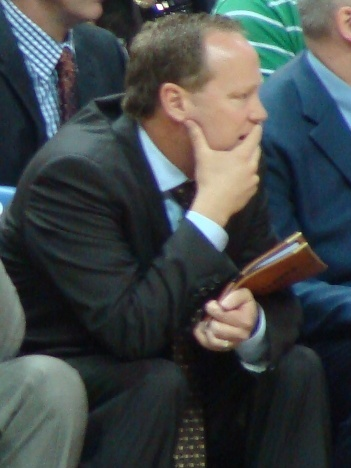
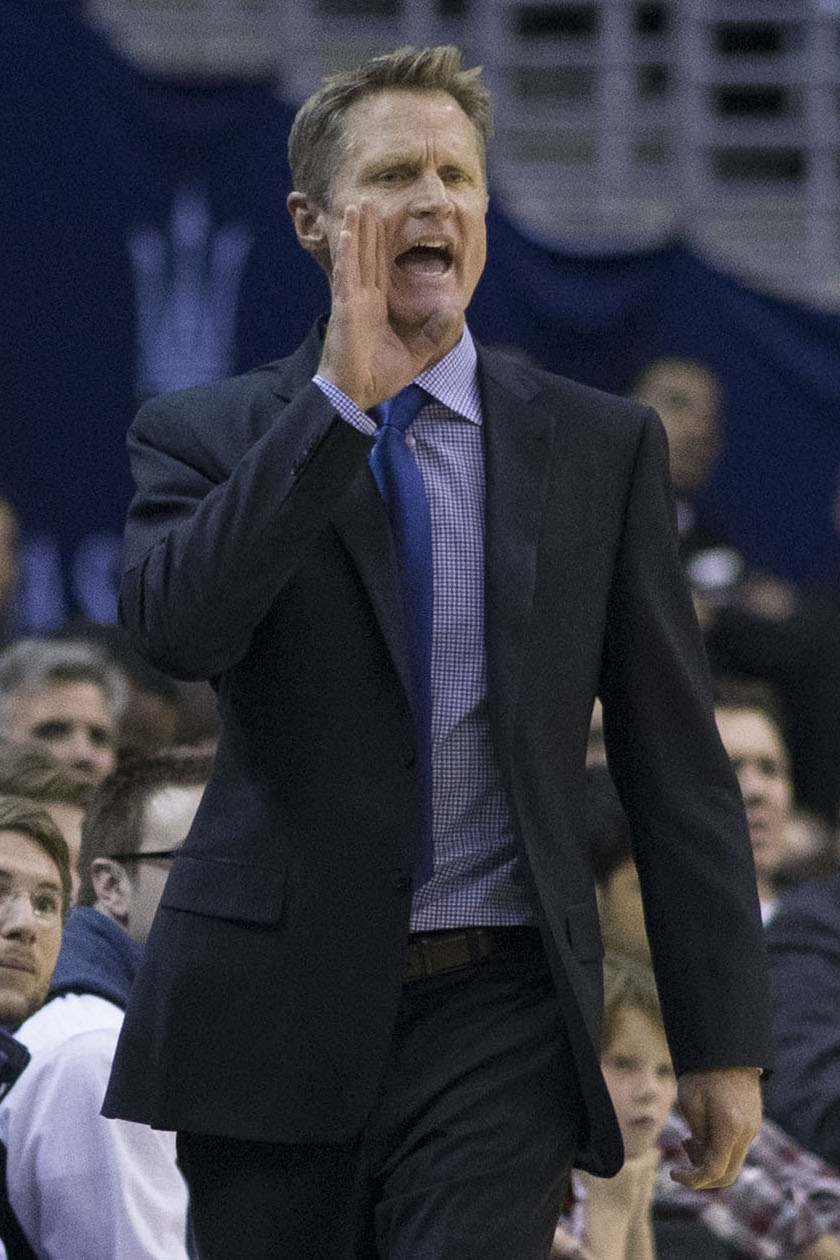
Mike Budenholzer (left) and Steve Kerr (right) were selected as the East and West head coach, respectively.

Mike Budenholzer, coach of the Atlanta Hawks, and Steve Kerr, coach of the Golden State Warriors, were selected as the East and West head coach, respectively. Both the Hawks and the Warriors led their respective conferences entering the game.

=== Roster ===
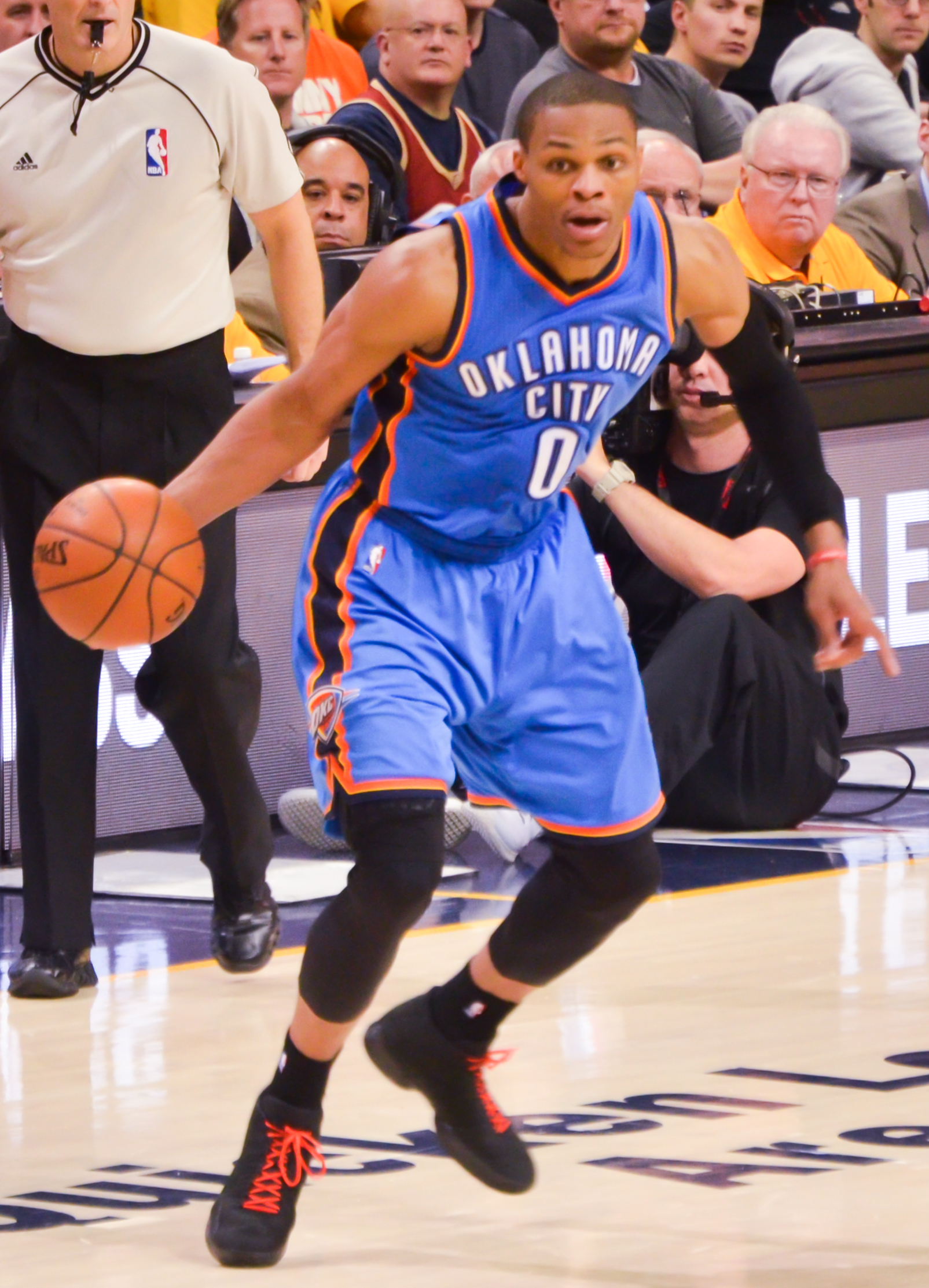
Russell Westbrook was named MVP of the All-Star game.

The rosters for the All-Star Game were chosen in two ways. The starters were chosen via a fan ballot. Two guards and three frontcourt players who received the highest vote were named the All-Star starters. NBA head coaches voted for the reserves for their respective conferences, none of which could be players on their own team. Each coach selected two guards, three frontcourt players and two wild cards, with each selected player ranked in order of preference within each category. If a multi-position player was to be selected, coaches were encouraged to vote for the player at the position that was "most advantageous for the All-Star team", regardless of where the player was listed on the All-Star ballot or the position he was listed in box scores. If a player is unable to participate due to injury, the commissioner will select a replacement.

Stephen Curry of the Golden State Warriors topped the ballots with 1,513,324 votes, which earned him a starting position as a guard in the Western Conference team. Kobe Bryant earned a record 17th consecutive All-Star selection, and Anthony Davis, Marc Gasol, and Blake Griffin completed the Western Conference starting positions. The first-time All-Stars in the West were the Warriors’ Klay Thompson and the Sacramento Kings' DeMarcus Cousins, who was selected as a replacement for the injured Bryant.

The Oklahoma City Thunder were represented by two players: Kevin Durant and Russell Westbrook, both of whom were reserves. Also sending a pair of players to the All-Star Game as reserves were the Portland Trail Blazers, represented by LaMarcus Aldridge and Damian Lillard. The remaining Western Conference reserves were Thompson, Cousins, Tim Duncan, James Harden, Chris Paul, Dirk Nowitzki, Kevin Durant, and Russell Westbrook. Golden State had two All-Star representatives for the first time since 1993, when Tim Hardaway and Chris Mullin were both All-Stars. It was also the first time the Warriors had a pair of starters since 1967, when Rick Barry and Nate Thurmond were both starters.

The Eastern Conference's leading vote-getter was Cleveland Cavaliers’ LeBron James, who finished with 1,470,483 votes. John Wall, Kyle Lowry, Pau Gasol, and Carmelo Anthony completed the Eastern Conference starting positions. The Eastern Conference team featured four first-time selections: Lowry, Jimmy Butler, Jeff Teague, and Kyle Korver. The Atlanta Hawks were represented by four players: Al Horford, Paul Millsap, Jeff Teague and Kyle Korver, all of whom were reserves. Chris Bosh, Dwyane Wade, and Kyrie Irving completed the remaining Eastern Conference reserves.

The Gasol brothers Marc and Pau were selected as the starting center of the West and the East respectively, marking the first time in NBA history, two brothers were picked to start in an All-Star Game. They were also the first brothers to jump center for the opening tip of an All-Star Game. The Gasols were also the first brothers to appear in the same All-Star Game since Tom and Dick Van Arsdale played in the 1970 and 1971 games.

Eastern Conference All-Stars
Pos	Player	Team	No. of selections	Votes
Starters
G	John Wall	Washington Wizards	2	886,368
G	Kyle Lowry	Toronto Raptors	1	805,290
F	LeBron James	Cleveland Cavaliers	11	1,470,483
F	Pau Gasol	Chicago Bulls	5	974,177
F	Carmelo Anthony	New York Knicks	8	647,005
Reserves
C	Al Horford	Atlanta Hawks	3	—
F	Chris Bosh	Miami Heat	10	—
F	Paul Millsap	Atlanta Hawks	2	—
G	Jimmy Butler	Chicago Bulls	1	—
G	Dwyane Wade^{INJ}	Miami Heat	11	—
G	Jeff Teague	Atlanta Hawks	1	—
G	Kyrie Irving	Cleveland Cavaliers	3	—
G	Kyle Korver^{REP3}	Atlanta Hawks	1	—
Head coach: Mike Budenholzer (Atlanta Hawks)

Western Conference All-Stars
Pos	Player	Team	No. of selections	Votes
Starters
G	Stephen Curry	Golden State Warriors	2	1,513,324
G	Kobe Bryant^{INJ}	Los Angeles Lakers	17	1,152,402
F	Anthony Davis^{INJ}	New Orleans Pelicans	2	1,369,911
C	Marc Gasol	Memphis Grizzlies	2	795,121
F	Blake Griffin^{INJ}	Los Angeles Clippers	5	700,615
Reserves
C	LaMarcus Aldridge^{ST}	Portland Trail Blazers	4	—
F	Tim Duncan	San Antonio Spurs	15	—
F	Kevin Durant	Oklahoma City Thunder	6	—
G	Klay Thompson^{ST}	Golden State Warriors	1	—
G	Russell Westbrook	Oklahoma City Thunder	4	—
G	James Harden^{ST}	Houston Rockets	3	—
G	Chris Paul	Los Angeles Clippers	8	—
C	DeMarcus Cousins^{REP1}	Sacramento Kings	1	—
G	Damian Lillard^{REP2}	Portland Trail Blazers	2	—
F	Dirk Nowitzki^{REP4}	Dallas Mavericks	13	—
Head coach: Steve Kerr (Golden State Warriors)

- INJ Bryant, Davis, Griffin and Wade were unable to participate due to injury.
- REP1 Cousins was named as Bryant's replacement.
- REP2 Lillard was named as Griffin's replacement.
- REP3 Korver was named as Wade's replacement.
- REP4 Nowitzki was named as Davis' replacement.
- ST Western Conference head coach Steve Kerr chose Aldridge, Harden and Thompson to start in place of the injured Bryant, Davis and Griffin.

=== Game ===
TNT

February 15, 2015
8:30 p.m. ET

Box score

Western Conference 163, Eastern Conference 158
Scoring by quarter: 47–36, 36–46, 39–40, 41–36
Pts: Russell Westbrook 41; Rebs: Marc Gasol 10; Asts: Chris Paul 15	Pts: LeBron James 30; Rebs: Pau Gasol 12; Asts: Kyle Lowry 8

Madison Square Garden, New York
Attendance: 17,198
Referees:
- Derrick Stafford
- Pat Fraher
- Sean Wright

Russell Westbrook scored 41 points and was named the NBA All-Star Game Most Valuable Player. He scored 27 points in 11 minutes in the first half, setting an All-Star record for points in a half. He finished one point shy of the All-Star game record set by Wilt Chamberlain (42) in 1962.

== All-Star Weekend ==
=== Celebrity Game ===
The 2015 Sprint NBA All-Star Celebrity Game was played on Friday, February 13, 2015. It was held at Madison Square Garden in New York City, home of the New York Knicks. This was the first celebrity game played at an NBA arena in the event's history. The game was televised nationally by ESPN.

This game featured 20 players including Arcade Fire frontman Win Butler, Bollywood actor Abhishek Bachchan, 2014 Little League World Series female pitcher Mo'ne Davis, WNBA player Skylar Diggins, Paralympic athlete Blake Leeper, NBA hall of famer Chris Mullin, and Memphis Grizzlies owner Robert Pera. This game also featured two All-Star Celebrity Game MVPs; 2010 winner Michael Rapaport and 2012, 2013, and 2014 winner Kevin Hart.

ESPN Radio's "Mike & Mike" hosts Mike Golic and Mike Greenberg coached the West and East teams respectively. The West team assistant coaches were film director Spike Lee and tennis legend John McEnroe. New York Knicks' small forward Carmelo Anthony and former Baylor Bears center Isaiah Austin was the assistant coaches for the East team. Actress and singer Keke Palmer sang the national anthem, and Canadian reggae fusion band Magic! performed at halftime.

Although the West led by Atlanta Dream point guard Shoni Schimmel with 17 points beat the East 57–51, Kevin Hart of the East who scored 15 points and won the MVP award. This was Hart's fourth MVP award in a row, a record for the Celebrity Game. Hart would then announce his retirement from the annual celebrity game.

February 13, 2015

Recap

West 57, East 51

Madison Square Garden, New York City

West
Player	Background
Anthony Anderson (2)	Actor
Win Butler	Singer
Nick Cannon (7)	TV personality, actor
Mo'ne Davis	Little League pitcher
Skylar Diggins (2)	WNBA player
Ansel Elgort	Actor
Chris Mullin (4)	Former NBA player
Robert Pera	Memphis Grizzlies owner
Sarah Silverman	Comedian, actress
Jesse Williams (3)	Actor
Head coach: Mike Golic (ESPN Radio's Mike & Mike co-host)
Assistant coach: Spike Lee (film director, actor)
Assistant coach: Pete Sampras (former professional tennis player)

East
Player	Background
Abhishek Bachchan	Bollywood actor
Chadwick Boseman	Actor
Tina Charles	WNBA player
Common (6)	Rapper, actor
Kevin Hart (5)	Comedian, actor
Allan Houston	Former NBA player
Kristen Ledlow (2)	NBA Inside Stuff co-host
Blake Leeper	Paralympic athlete
Michael Rapaport (5)	Actor
Shoni Schimmel	WNBA player
Head coach: Mike Greenberg (ESPN Radio's Mike & Mike co-host)
Assistant coach: Carmelo Anthony (NBA player, New York Knicks)
Assistant coach: Isaiah Austin (former Baylor Bears player)

=== Rising Stars Challenge ===
Team World
Pos.	Nat.	Player	Team	R/S
C	(New Zealand)	Steven Adams^{INJ1}	Oklahoma City Thunder	Sophomore
G/F	(Greece)	Giannis Antetokounmpo	Milwaukee Bucks	Sophomore
F	(Croatia)	Bojan Bogdanović	Brooklyn Nets	Rookie
C	(Senegal)	Gorgui Dieng	Minnesota Timberwolves	Sophomore
G	(Australia)	Danté Exum	Utah Jazz	Rookie
C	(France)	Rudy Gobert	Utah Jazz	Sophomore
F	(Montenegro)	Nikola Mirotić	Chicago Bulls	Rookie
C/F	(Canada)	Kelly Olynyk^{INJ3}	Boston Celtics	Sophomore
G	(Germany)	Dennis Schröder	Atlanta Hawks	Sophomore
F/G	(Canada)	Andrew Wiggins	Minnesota Timberwolves	Rookie
C	(Bosnia and Herzegovina)	Jusuf Nurkić^{REP1}^{/}^{OUT}	Denver Nuggets	Rookie
G	(Australia)	Matthew Dellavedova^{REP3}	Cleveland Cavaliers	Sophomore
F	(Greece)	Kostas Papanikolaou^{REP4}	Houston Rockets	Rookie
Head coach: Kenny Atkinson (Atlanta Hawks)

Team USA
Pos.	Player	Team	R/S
G	Trey Burke	Utah Jazz	Sophomore
G	Kentavious Caldwell-Pope	Detroit Pistons	Sophomore
G	Michael Carter-Williams^{INJ2}	Philadelphia 76ers	Sophomore
G	Zach LaVine	Minnesota Timberwolves	Rookie
G/F	Shabazz Muhammad	Minnesota Timberwolves	Sophomore
C	Nerlens Noel	Philadelphia 76ers	Rookie
G	Victor Oladipo	Orlando Magic	Sophomore
G	Elfrid Payton	Orlando Magic	Rookie
C/F	Mason Plumlee	Brooklyn Nets	Sophomore
C/F	Cody Zeller	Charlotte Hornets	Sophomore
F	Robert Covington^{REP2}	Philadelphia 76ers	Sophomore
Head coach: Alvin Gentry (Golden State Warriors)

^INJ1 Adams was unable to participate due to injury.
^REP1 Nurkić was named as Adams' replacement.
^INJ2 Carter-Williams was unable to participate due to injuries.
^REP2 Covington was named as Carter-Williams' replacement.
^INJ3 Olynyk was unable to participate due to injury.
^REP3 Dellavedova was named as Olynyk's replacement.
^OUT Nurkić decided to not participate for personal reasons.
^REP4 Papanikolaou was named as Nurkić's replacement.

TNT

February 13
9:00 p.m. ET

Boxscore

Team World 121, Team USA 112
Scoring by half: 69–67, 52–45
Pts: Andrew Wiggins 22; Rebs: Rudy Gobert 12; Asts: Dennis Schröder 9	Pts: Oladipo, LaVine 22; Rebs: Mason Plumlee 9 Asts: Oladipo, Burke 4

Barclays Center, Brooklyn, New York
Attendance: 15,451
Referees:
- #73 Tre Maddox
- #77 Karl Lane
- #79 Kevin Scott

The World team won against the U.S. 121–112 at the Rising Stars Challenge at All-Star weekend. Canada's Andrew Wiggins scored 22 points, and Rudy Gobert added 18 points, 12 rebounds and three blocks. Brooklyn's Bojan Bogdanovic of Croatia, and Chicago's Nikola Mirotić of Montenegro added 16 points each for the World team. Victor Oladipo of the Orlando Magic and Zach LaVine of the Minnesota Timberwolves led the U.S. team with 22 points each. Andrew Wiggins, the 2014 NBA draft 1st overall pick, won the game's MVP award.

=== Shooting Stars Competition ===
Contestants
Team Name	Members	Team	First round	Final round
Team Bosh	Chris Bosh	Miami Heat	30.8	57.6
Team Bosh	Swin Cash	New York Liberty	30.8	57.6
Team Bosh	Dominique Wilkins	Atlanta Hawks legend	30.8	57.6
Team Westbrook	Russell Westbrook	Oklahoma City Thunder	35.2	DNF
Team Westbrook	Tamika Catchings	Indiana Fever	35.2	DNF
Team Westbrook	Penny Hardaway	Orlando Magic legend	35.2	DNF
Team Curry	Stephen Curry	Golden State Warriors	47.0	–
Team Curry	Sue Bird	Seattle Storm	47.0	–
Team Curry	Dell Curry	Charlotte Hornets legend	47.0	–
Team Millsap	Anthony Davis^{[a]}	New Orleans Pelicans	51.4	–
Team Millsap	Paul Millsap^{[a]}	Atlanta Hawks	51.4	–
Team Millsap	Elena Delle Donne	Chicago Sky	51.4	–
Team Millsap	Scottie Pippen	Chicago Bulls legend	51.4	–

a.^{1} ^{2} Anthony Davis was replaced by Paul Millsap.
b. NBA Legends wore a current era jersey of the team best associated with the player, except for Dell Curry, a special exception because the old Charlotte Hornets relocated to New Orleans in 2002 and became the Pelicans in 2013. Curry's official statistics belong to the Pelicans, but represented the new Charlotte Hornets, formerly known as the Charlotte Bobcats from 2004–2014, and wore their 2014 jersey in the contest.

=== Skills Challenge ===
Contestants
Pos.	Player	Team	Height	Weight
G/F	Jimmy Butler^{[d]}	Chicago Bulls	6–7	220
G	Jeff Teague	Atlanta Hawks	6–2	181
G	Kyle Lowry	Toronto Raptors	6–0	205
G	John Wall^{[b]}	Washington Wizards	6–4	195
G	Michael Carter-Williams ^{[c]}	Philadelphia 76ers	6–6	190
G	Brandon Knight	Milwaukee Bucks	6–3	189
G	Dennis Schröder^{[d]}	Atlanta Hawks	6–1	168
G	Patrick Beverley^{[b]}	Houston Rockets	6–1	185
G	Elfrid Payton ^{[c]}	Orlando Magic	6–4	185
G	Trey Burke	Utah Jazz	6–1	185
G	Isaiah Thomas	Phoenix Suns	5–9	185

b.^{1} ^{2} John Wall was replaced by Patrick Beverley.
c.^{1} ^{2} Michael Carter-Williams was replaced by Elfrid Payton.
d.^{1} ^{2} Jimmy Butler was replaced by Dennis Schröder.

Quarterfinals
1	Isaiah Thomas (Phoenix)	X
8	Patrick Beverley (Houston)	O
4	Jeff Teague (Atlanta)	O
5	Elfrid Payton (Orlando)	X
2	Trey Burke (Utah)	X
7	Brandon Knight (Milwaukee)	O
3	Kyle Lowry (Toronto)	O
6	Dennis Schröder (Atlanta)	X

Semifinals
Patrick Beverley (Houston)	O
Jeff Teague (Atlanta)	X
Brandon Knight (Milwaukee)	O
Kyle Lowry (Toronto)	X

Finals
Patrick Beverley (Houston)	O
Brandon Knight (Milwaukee)	X

=== Three-Point Contest ===
Contestants
Pos.	Player	Team	Height	Weight	First round	Final round
G	Stephen Curry	Golden State Warriors	6–3	190	23	27
G	Kyrie Irving	Cleveland Cavaliers	6–3	193	23	17
G	Klay Thompson	Golden State Warriors	6–7	215	24	14
G	Wesley Matthews	Portland Trail Blazers	6–5	220	22	–
G/F	Kyle Korver	Atlanta Hawks	6–7	212	18	–
G	Marco Belinelli	San Antonio Spurs	6–5	195	18	–
G	JJ Redick	Los Angeles Clippers	6–4	190	17	–
G	James Harden	Houston Rockets	6–5	225	15	–

=== Slam Dunk Contest ===
Rookie Zach LaVine won the Slam Dunk Contest to become the youngest champion (19) since an 18-year-old Kobe Bryant in 1997. He became a crowd favorite after his first dunk, which he performed while wearing Michael Jordan's No. 23 jersey from the movie Space Jam, which inspired him as a youngster to become a basketball player. With a perfect 50 on each of his first two dunks, Lavine was the first player since Dwight Howard in 2009 with a perfect score on multiple dunks. Yahoo! Sports hailed him as "the most electrifying performer of All-Star Saturday Night ... and, if we're being honest, in quite a number of years."

Contestants
Pos.	Player	Team	Height	Weight	First round	Final round
G	Zach LaVine	Minnesota Timberwolves	6–5	183	100 (50+50)	94 (45+49)
G	Victor Oladipo	Orlando Magic	6–4	210	89 (50+39)	72 (31+41)
F/C	Mason Plumlee	Brooklyn Nets	6–11	235	76 (40+36)	–
G/F	Giannis Antetokounmpo	Milwaukee Bucks	6–11	217	65 (30+35)	–
