= Tracy Wolfson =

American sportscaster (born 1975)

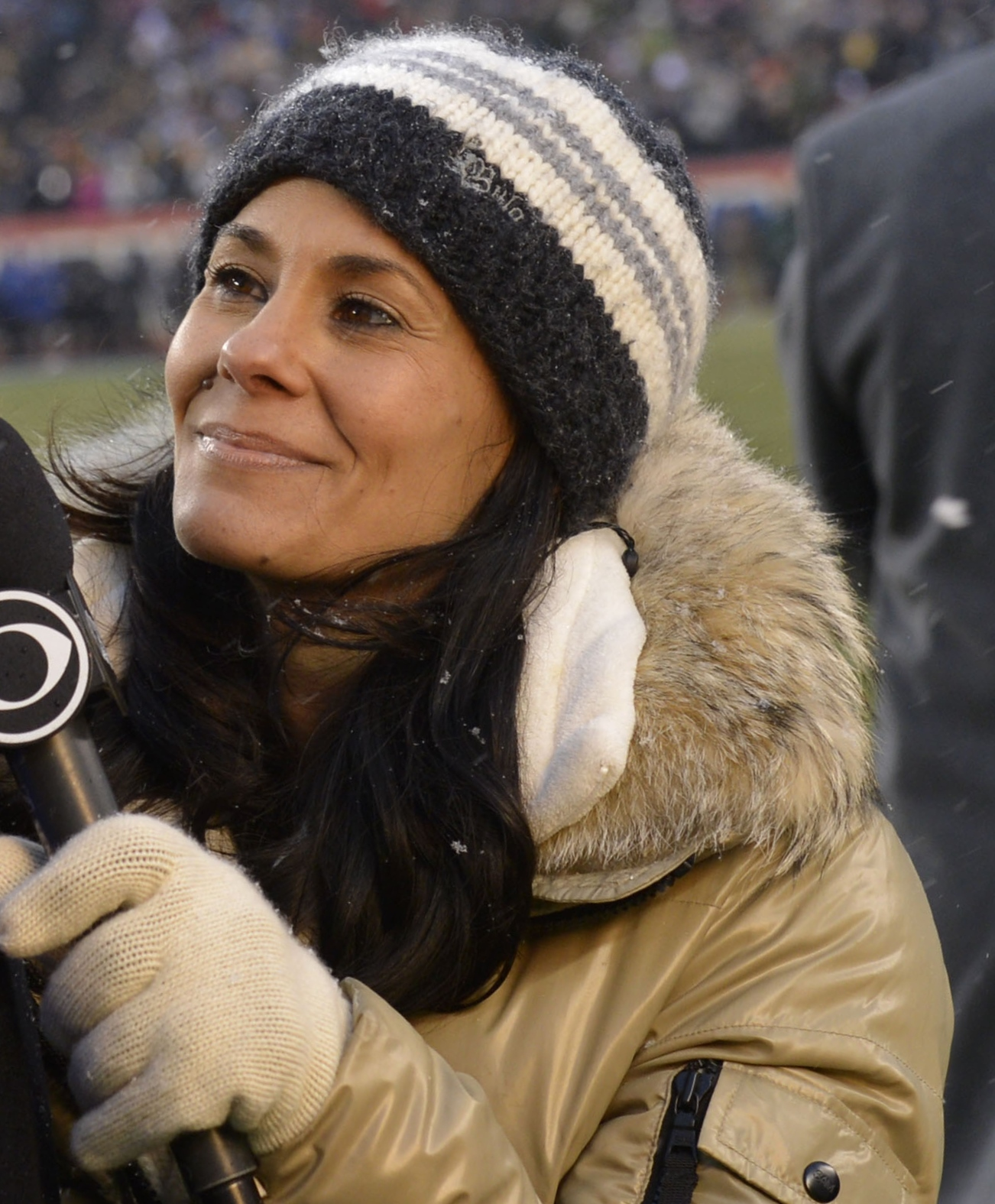
- Wolfson at the 2013 U.S. Army–Navy Game
- Born: March 17, 1975 (age 51); Congers, New York, U.S.
- Education: University of Michigan
- Occupation: CBS Sports sideline reporter
- Years active: 2002–present
- Spouse: David Reichel
- Children: 3

Tracy Wolfson (born March 17, 1975) is an American sportscaster for CBS Sports. She is the lead sideline reporter for the NFL on CBS.

== Early life ==
Wolfson grew up in Congers, New York, and attended Clarkstown High School North, in New City, New York. She graduated from the University of Michigan in 1997 with a degree in communications.

== Career ==
Wolfson's on-air career began at WZBN in Trenton, New Jersey, as a sports anchor. She also appeared as a reporter for Long Island News Tonight (LI News Tonight), a local Long Island college-run news station. She later worked for MSG Network as an anchor and reporter as well as covering golf, college football and arena football for ESPN from 2002 to 2003.

Wolfson is the lead field/floor reporter for all live CBS Sports football and basketball broadcasts. She works with the lead on-air talent team in each of the sports she covers.

She was the CBS college football sideline reporter from 2004 to 2013, considered to be part of one of the best college football broadcast teams in the country. As a sideline reporter, Wolfson primarily interviewed coaches at the end of each half and also gave updates on player injuries. Additionally, she is an anchor on the CBS Sportsdesk as well as a reporter for college basketball, auto racing, skiing, ice skating, gymnastics, tennis, track and field and rodeo. Since 2004, she has covered the NCAA Men's Basketball Final Four. Wolfson did postseason sideline reporting for the NBA on TNT from the 2011–2016 NBA Playoffs and is a contributor to the NFL on CBS by filing reports on the Super Bowl and sideline reporting for preseason games with Greg Gumbel and Dan Dierdorf or Ian Eagle and Phil Simms, such as the Seahawks-Packers preseason game in 2013.

Wolfson's voice is also featured during sideline reports in NCAA College Hoops 2K8 on the Xbox 360 & PlayStation 3 game consoles.

On May 22, 2014, it was announced that Wolfson would be joining Jim Nantz and Phil Simms as an NFL sideline reporter on Thursday night and some Sunday afternoon games starting in the 2014 season.

She was the floor reporter for the NCAA men's basketball championship games in 2016 on TBS and 2017 on CBS.

Wolfson has been the sideline reporter for Super Bowls XLVII, 50, LIII, LV, and LVIII.

== Accolades ==
In 2005, she was asked to be a part of Mississippi State University's College Sports Speaker series and has been a spokeswoman and M.C. for several Foundation for Diabetes Research events since 2005. In 2004 she was named one of the "Best New Faces" of the NCAA tournament in USA Today.

== Personal life ==
She resides in Tenafly, New Jersey with her husband, David Reichel and their three sons. Wolfson is Jewish.
