= Bob Golic =

American actor and football player (born 1957)

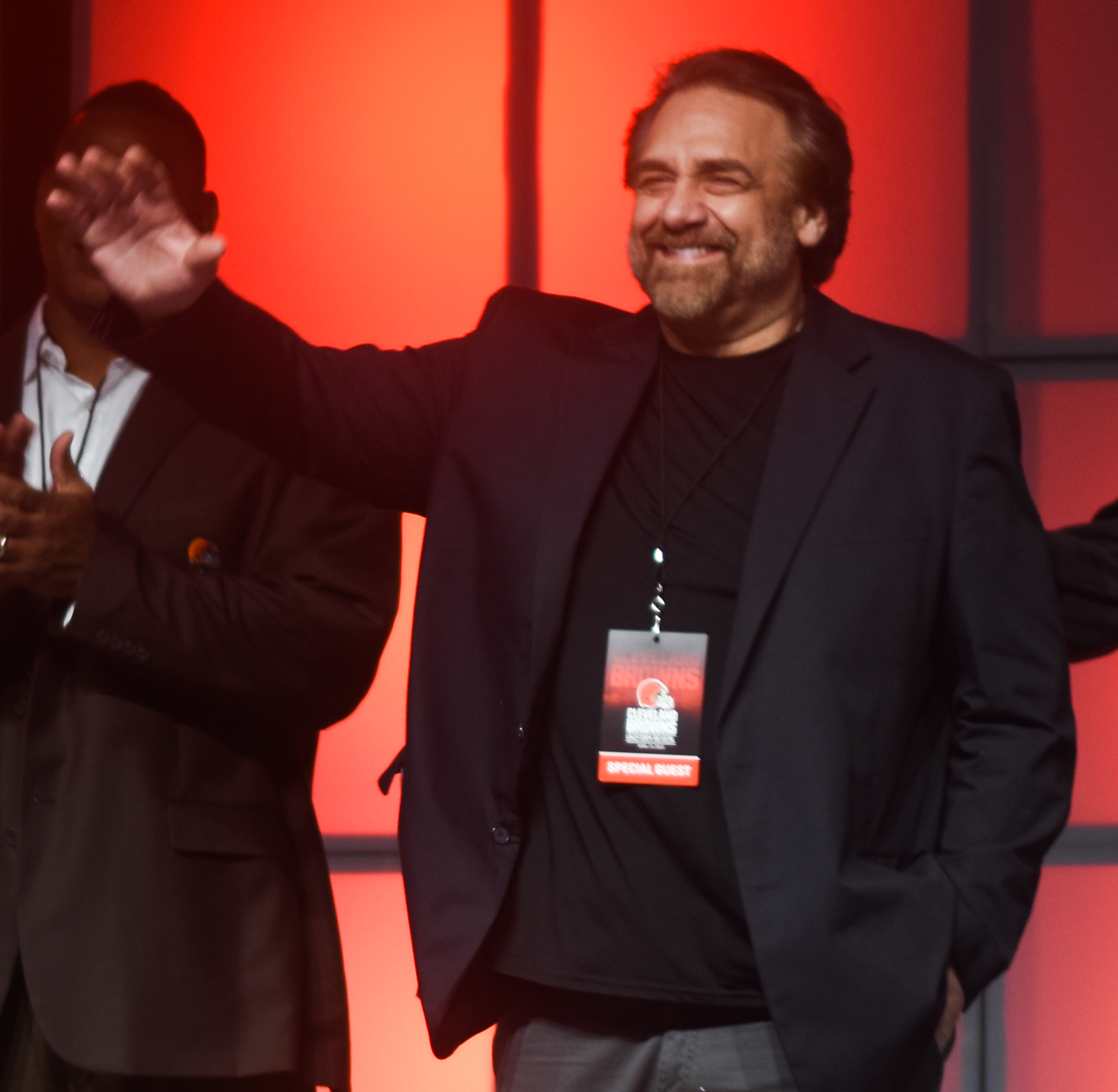
- Golic in 2015

No. 51, 79
- Position: Defensive tackle

Personal information
- Born: October 26, 1957 (age 69); Cleveland, Ohio, U.S.
- Listed height: 6 ft 2 in (1.88 m)
- Listed weight: 248 lb (112 kg)

Career information
- High school: St. Joseph (Cleveland)
- College: Notre Dame (1975–1978)
- NFL draft: 1979: 2nd round, 52nd overall pick

Career history
- New England Patriots (1979–1981); Cleveland Browns (1982–1988); Los Angeles Raiders (1989–1992)

Awards and highlights
- 2× Second-team All-Pro (1985, 1986); 3× Pro Bowl (1985–1987); Cleveland Browns Legends; National champion (1977); Unanimous All-American (1978); Second-team All-American (1977)

Career NFL statistics
- Sacks: 22.5
- Fumble recoveries: 5
- Interceptions: 1
- Stats at Pro Football Reference

Bob Golic
- Spouse(s): Karen Golic (m.1996), Jacquelyn Benlein (1983–1992)
- Children: 3
- Presenting career
- Show: The Bob Golic Show
- Station: WNIR 100.1 FM
- Time slot: Monday-Friday 3:00 to 7:00 pm, Saturday 12:00 to 4:00 pm
- Style: Talk
- Country: United States
- Website: wnir.com

Medal record

Collegiate Wrestling

Representing the Notre Dame Fighting Irish

NCAA Division I Championships
Bronze medal – third place	1978 College Park	Heavyweight

Robert Perry Golic (/ˈɡoʊlɪk/ GOH-lik; born October 26, 1957) is an American former professional football player, television actor, radio personality, and sports commentator.

Golic played defensive tackle in the National Football League (NFL) for 14 seasons from 1979 to 1992 with the New England Patriots, Cleveland Browns, and Los Angeles Raiders. He played college football for the Notre Dame Fighting Irish, winning a national championship in 1977 and earning unanimous All-American honors. In wrestling, he was a two-time All-American.

He is the older brother of Mike Golic and uncle of Mike Golic Jr.

== Early life ==
Golic was born in Cleveland, Ohio to Dorothy and Louis Robert "Bob" Golic. The family is of Slovenian descent. He has two brothers, Greg and Mike, who also played in the NFL. His father also went by the nickname Bob; however, they are not named with the generational titles of junior or senior. The elder Golic had a seven year professional playing career in the Canadian Football League from 1956 to 1962. He played for the Hamilton Tiger-Cats, Montreal Alouettes, and Saskatchewan Roughriders. He won the Grey Cup with Hamilton in 1957. Louis Robert Golic died on Friday, June 28, 2013, from heart failure.

Robert Perry Golic attended St. Joseph's High School, at the time an all-boys school in Cleveland, where he played high school football and wrestled. As a high school wrestler, Golic won the Ohio high school heavyweight championship in 1975, beating Harold Smith of Canton McKinley High School, a future Olympian. He also defeated future NFL player Tom Cousineau from cross-town all-boys school rival St. Edward High School in Lakewood, Ohio in the tournament semifinals. The match between Golic and Cousineau, who placed third, has been called "one of the most memorable" in the tournament's history. Cousineau later was a two-time All-American at linebacker at Ohio State in Columbus. Golic and Cousineau eventually were teammates in the NFL with the Cleveland Browns.

== College career ==
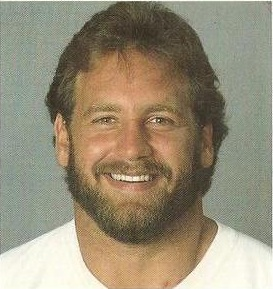
Golic in 1985

Golic received a football scholarship to attend the University of Notre Dame in Notre Dame, Indiana, where he also wrestled. He played for the Notre Dame Fighting Irish football team from 1975 to 1978. He was a member of the 1977 NCAA national champion football team. He was selected as a second-team All-American for the 1977 season, and a unanimous first-team All-American in 1978.

Golic was one of the nation's top collegiate wrestlers while at Notre Dame, with a three-year record of 54–4–1, finishing third in NCAA meet in 1976 and fourth in 1977. He was named a two-time All-American for Notre Dame as a heavyweight wrestler, capturing fourth place at the 1977 NCAA tournament and finishing third in 1978. He graduated from Notre Dame in 1979 with a B.A. degree in management.

== Professional career ==
The New England Patriots chose Golic, as a linebacker, in the second round (52nd pick overall) of the 1979 NFL Draft, and he played for the Patriots from 1979 to 1981.

Golic was cut by the Patriots going into the 1982 season and claimed on waivers by the Cleveland Browns. The Browns moved him from linebacker to nose tackle. After seven years with the Browns, he went to the Los Angeles Raiders through Plan B free agency where he played his last four NFL seasons. He was a 3-time Pro Bowler (1985, 1986, and 1987) while playing with the Cleveland Browns.

== Post-playing career ==
After retiring from football, Golic pursued an acting career. His first appearance was in Coach on ABC playing one of Hayden Fox's former players who went on to an NFL career, but confiding to Hayden that he has cancer due to anabolic steroid use. He then appeared in Saved by the Bell: The College Years, arguably his best known role, playing the role of Mike Rogers, a retired San Francisco 49ers player who became the resident adviser of Cal U, the fictional college attended by the cast. He appeared in the role for the NBC made-for-TV-movie Saved by the Bell: Wedding in Las Vegas in 1994. From 1996 until 1998, Golic also was one of the members of the original Home and Family when it aired on The Family Channel (now known as Freeform).

Golic hosted sports talk radio programs and did sports reporting for TV stations in Los Angeles; had a stint on Britain's late 80s–90s NFL coverage on Channel 4, opposite presenter Gary Imlach; served as analyst on NBC's NFL coverage from 1994 to 1996; and was a commentator for TNN's coverage of the short-lived XFL in 2001. In 2004, Golic returned to Northeast Ohio to host the afternoon drive time radio talk show on WNIR 100.1 FM in Akron, Ohio. He is also a football analyst for WOIO Channel 19 in Cleveland on CBS.

Golic opened a restaurant and bar in downtown Cleveland's Warehouse District (Bob Golic's Sports Bar & Grille). The restaurant closed in June 2014. He was the vice president of Football Operations for the Lingerie Football League expansion team, the Cleveland Crush until operations ceased in 2015.

== Personal life ==
Golic is the older brother of Mike Golic, who is a former NFL football player and was a radio host, first as half of ESPN Radio's Mike & Mike, followed by ESPN Radio's Golic and Wingo. His nephews are Mike Golic Jr., himself a former football player turned radio host, and Jake, who began studying at the University of Notre Dame in 2009.

Mike Golic is a spokesperson for Nutrisystem after losing more than 50 lb (23 kg) on the diet; however, Bob Golic has outdone his younger brother, dropping more than 140 lb (64 kg), returning to his high school weight of 245 lb (111 kg). Bob Golic married Jacquelyn Benlein in 1983 and they had a child before divorcing in 1992.

Golic lives with his family in Solon, Ohio. He and Karen Baughman married in 1996 and they have two children. Karen was a ballerina and Raiderette with the Oakland Raiders. Bob performed The Nutcracker with Karen at the Akron Civic Theatre in Akron in 2006.
