= Bob Golic (Canadian football) =

American gridiron football player (1931–2013)

Profile
- Positions: Tackle, Guard

Personal information
- Born: June 19, 1931; Willowick, Ohio, U.S.
- Died: June 28, 2013 (aged 82); Columbus, Ohio, U.S.
- Listed height: 6 ft 3 in (1.91 m)
- Listed weight: 242 lb (110 kg)

Career information
- College: Indiana (1954-1955)

Career history
- 1956: Montreal Alouettes
- 1956–1957: Hamilton Tiger-Cats
- 1959–1962: Saskatchewan Roughriders

Awards and highlights
- Grey Cup champion (1957)

Louis Robert Golic (June 19, 1931 – June 28, 2013) was an American professional Canadian football player who played for the Montreal Alouettes, Hamilton Tiger-Cats and Saskatchewan Roughriders. He won the Grey Cup with Hamilton in 1957. He played college football at Indiana University Bloomington. He was the father of American football players Mike Golic and Bob Golic as well as the grandfather of Mike Golic Jr.
