= Northwest Catholic High School =

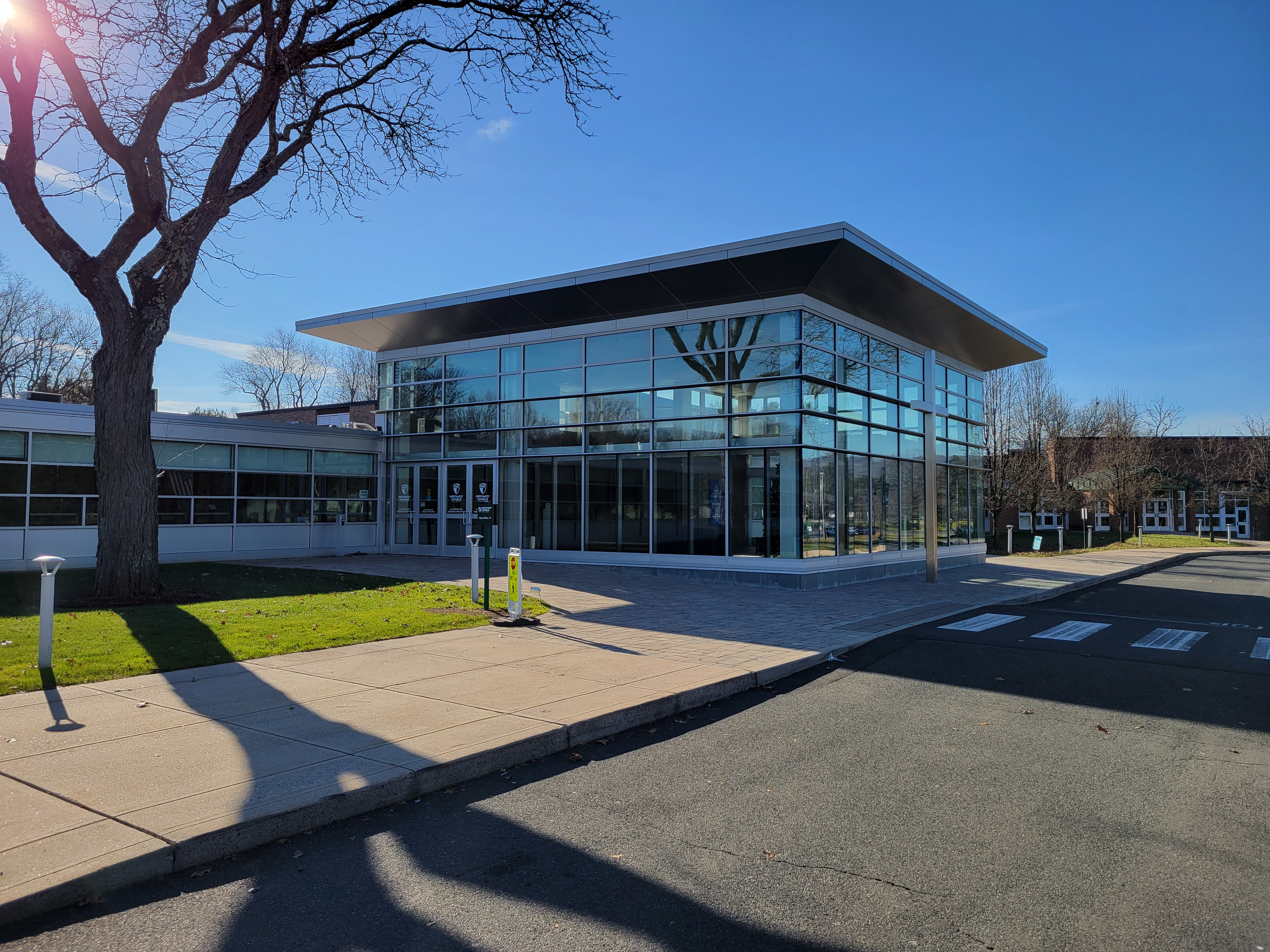

Location
- 29 Wampanoag Drive; West Hartford, Connecticut 06117; United States; 41°47′58″N 72°45′9″W

Information
- Other name: NWC
- Type: Private high school
- Motto: Latin: In lumine tuo videbimus lumen (In Your light we shall see light)
- Religious affiliation: Roman Catholic
- Established: 1961 (65 years ago)
- Oversight: Roman Catholic Archdiocese of Hartford
- CEEB code: 070896
- NCES School ID: 00230293
- Principal: Jennifer Montoney
- Head of school: Michael J. Clark
- Teaching staff: 44.5 (on an FTE basis)
- Grades: 9–12
- Gender: Co-educational
- Enrollment: 490 (2021-2022)
- Student to teacher ratio: 11.8
- Colors: Green and white
- Athletics conference: Central Connecticut Conference
- Mascot: Lion
- Nickname: Lions
- Accreditation: NEASC
- Newspaper: Northwest Passages
- Yearbook: NOWECA (derived from NOrthWEstCAtholic)
- Website: www.northwestcatholic.org

Northwest Catholic High School (NWC) is a private, Roman Catholic, co-educational high school in West Hartford, Connecticut, United States. It was established in 1961 and is located in the Roman Catholic Archdiocese of Hartford.

== Notable alumni ==
- John L. Flannery, business executive
- Mike Golic Jr., broadcaster and NFL player
- Kevin J. Tracey, doctor

== Athletics ==
=== CIAC State Championships ===
Team	Year
Boys Outdoor Track	1986, 1987, 1988, 1989, 1990, 2010, 2012, 2016
Girls Outdoor Track	1976, 1989, 1995, 1996, 1999, 2006, 2017
Boys Basketball	1972, 1973, 1998, 2000, 2002, 2003
Girls Basketball	1988, 1996, 1999, 2023, 2024, 2025
Golf	1996, 2000, 2008, 2010, 2012
Girls Soccer	2009, 2011, 2012, 2013
Boys Cross Country	1976, 1984, 1985
Girls Tennis	2014, 2015
Boys Indoor Track	1981, 2012
Girls Indoor Track	1995, 2024
Boys Soccer	2002
Girls Cross Country	1987
Baseball	2015
Girls Lacrosse	2012
Softball	1981
