= Russell Findlay (businessman) =

American businessman and philanthropist

- Born: May 4, 1965 (age 61); Rochester, New York, US
- Education: SUNY Oswego (BS); Xavier University (MBA); Massachusetts Institute of Technology
- Occupations: Marketing, Advertising, small business entrepreneur, philanthropist
- Years active: 1990-present
- Board member of: Association of National Advertisers

J. Russell Findlay (born May 4, 1965) is an American businessman, philanthropist and an advertising and marketing executive. He is the global chief marketing officer at Hiscox, an international specialist insurer as well as a small business owner and a managing director of a non-profit organization.

== Education ==
Findlay's undergraduate degree is in marketing from SUNY Oswego, where he is on the board of the School of Business. He also has an MBA with a concentration in marketing and advertising from Xavier University, and a Financial Technology certificate from Massachusetts Institute of Technology.

== Career ==
Findlay was the first chief marketing officer in the history of Major League Soccer. Before MLS, he worked for PepsiCo with the American Advertising Federation Hall of Fame inductee Alan Pottasch. He worked at PepsiCo under the chairmen Roger Enrico, Steven Reinemund and Indra Nooyi. While there, he helped to launch SoBe Mr. Green soft drink, Sierra Mist and Sierra Mist Free, including helping to produce a TV commercial putting the soccer players Freddy Adu and Pelé together for the first time.

Findlay also launched Pepsi Max while at PepsiCo. He was responsible for negotiating an on-air integrated marketing sponsorship deal with ABC's Duel.

Findlay started his career at Unilever as a territory sales rep before moving to new business innovation then into its brand marketing department at Lever House.

In November 2013, Findlay was appointed as the global chief marketing officer at Hiscox.

== Honors and awards ==
He has earned two Effie Awards for effective advertising., several Financial Communication Society Awards including Best in Show, a Global Ace award, the CMO Club Growth Award the ANA's B2B Marketer of the Year and was named as one of 2014's 30 most influential marketers in the world. He has been a final round judge of the Effie Awards, the ANA's B2 awards, the BMA Global Ace Awards and the FCS Portfolio Awards

In 2019, Findlay was awarded the FCS Jamie DePeau Leadership Award from the Financial Communications Society. The objective of the Jamie DePeau Leadership award is to honor, every year, FCS members who, through personal and professional contributions to their communities, serve as living examples of the selfless, inspirational leadership that Jamie DePeau embodied during her career in financial services marketing.

== Publications ==
Findlay has written or has been mentioned or quoted in a number of publications including:

Books:

- Nick Johnson, The Future of Marketing
- Target2000,

Print:

- "7 Simple Steps to Expanding Overseas", Inc.
- Kate Maddox, "ANA/BMA16: A Business Insurance Company Embraces Risk", Adage, June 2, 2016
- "In Its New Ad Campaign, Small-Business Insurer Hiscox Asks if America Has 'Lost Its Courage'" and "Young CEOs Open Up About Their Failures", Adweek
- "Hiscox Takes a Risk With Revamped Insurance Branding", "VIEW FROM THE TOP" and "Hiscox Debuts Barcode Campaign to Target Small Businesses£, Chief Marketer
- B-to-B Marketer, Winter 2016
- Quality Financial Media

== Personal ==
Findlay is related to the advertising and media couple, the New York Post editor Joseph Cookman and his wife, the Ladies Home Journal editor Mary Bass. He also runs the Findlay Family Foundation, a non-profit 501c3 organization providing college scholarships to high school seniors from underprivileged school districts. Findlay is a US Soccer referee.
