= Mike Golic Jr. =

American football player and broadcaster (born 1989)

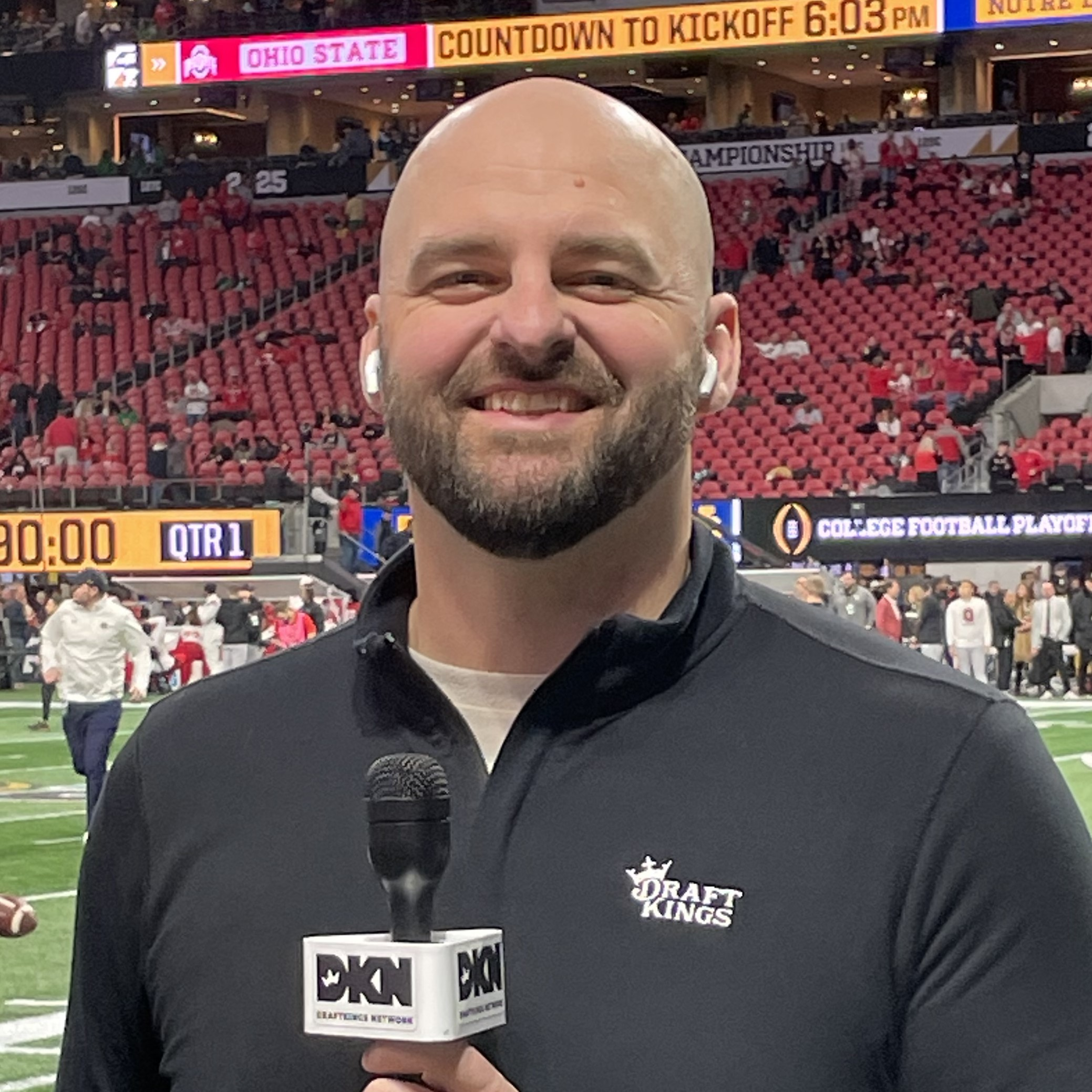
- Golic at the 2025 CFP National Championship

No. 67
- Position: Offensive guard

Personal information
- Born: September 28, 1989 (age 37); Voorhees, New Jersey, U.S.
- Listed height: 6 ft 4 in (1.93 m)
- Listed weight: 300 lb (136 kg)

Career information
- High school: West Hartford (CT) Northwest Catholic
- College: Notre Dame (2008–2012)
- NFL draft: 2013: undrafted

Career history
- Pittsburgh Steelers (2013)*; New Orleans Saints (2014)*; Montreal Alouettes (2014)*; Brooklyn Bolts (2014); Arizona Rattlers (2015)*; New Orleans Saints (2015)*
- * Offseason or practice squad member only

Awards and highlights
- 2014 FXFL All-Star
- Stats at Pro Football Reference

Michael Louis Golic Jr. (born September 28, 1989) is an American broadcaster and podcast host. He was most recently affiliated with ESPN Radio (until February 8, 2022) and was a former professional football offensive guard. He played college football at Notre Dame. He signed with the Pittsburgh Steelers as an undrafted free agent in 2013.

== Early life ==
Golic attended Northwest Catholic High School in West Hartford, Connecticut, where he was a standout lineman for the Northwest Catholic Indians high school football team. He was selected to play in the U.S. Army All-American Bowl in San Antonio. He was named to the Connecticut High School Coaches Association Class S all-state team in both his junior and senior season.

College recruiting
Name	Hometown	School	Height	Weight	40^{‡}	Commit date
Mike Golic Jr. OL	West Hartford, CT	Northwest Catholic	6 ft 5 in (1.96 m)	260 lb (120 kg)	5.1	Feb 19, 2007
Mike Golic Jr. OL	Recruit ratings: Scout: Rivals:					
Overall recruit ranking: Scout: 30 (OG) Rivals: 8 (OL), – (National), 4 (Connecticut)
‡ Refers to 40-yard dash; Note: In many cases, Scout, Rivals, 247Sports, On3, and ESPN may conflict in their listings of height, weight and 40 time.; In these cases, the average was taken. ESPN grades are on a 100-point scale.; Sources: "2008 Notre Dame Football Commitments". Rivals.; "2008 Notre Dame Football Recruiting Commits". Scout.; "Scout.com Team Recruiting Rankings". Scout.; "2008 Team Ranking". Rivals.com.

== College career ==
Golic played college football at Notre Dame. On November 8, 2012, he was selected to the Capital One Academic All-District V team and on December 6, 2012 he also was selected to the Capital One Academic All-America Football Team along with his Notre Dame Fighting Irish teammate Manti Te'o.

== Professional career ==
=== Pittsburgh Steelers ===
On April 27, 2013, he signed with the Pittsburgh Steelers as an undrafted free agent. On August 31, 2013, the Steelers announced that he was among the players cut to reach their 53-man roster.

=== New Orleans Saints ===
On May 10, 2014 the New Orleans Saints signed Golic to a two-year deal. He was then waived from the Saints on June 2, 2014. Golic re-signed with the New Orleans Saints on April 16, 2015 and was released by the team on September 5, 2015.

=== Montreal Alouettes ===
Following his release from the Saints, Golic took part in the Montreal Alouettes training camp. He joined the team on June 11 but was released prior to the start of the season.

=== Arizona Rattlers ===
On September 25, 2014, Golic was assigned to the Arizona Rattlers of the Arena Football League (AFL). On November 11, 2015, Golic was placed on recallable reassignment.

=== Retirement ===
On August 19, 2016, while co-hosting The Dan Le Batard Show with Stugotz, Golic announced his retirement from professional football.

== Broadcasting career ==
=== ESPN Radio ===
Golic was the host of First and Last. He was a regular guest co-host of Mike & Mike (normally filling in for his father) and became a regular on the succeeding program Golic and Wingo in November 2017. He also co-hosted "Weekend Observations" with Jon "Stugotz" Weiner from February 2017 to February 2018.

On August 17, 2020, Golic Jr. and his new partner, Chiney Ogwumike, debuted their new afternoon drive radio show, Chiney & Golic Jr., on ESPN Radio from 4 p.m. to 7 p.m. ET. Chiney Ogwumike left the show in the fall of 2021 to take over duties as a regular analyst on ESPN's NBA Today. Chris Canty took over her post. On February 8, 2022, Golic used his Twitter account to announce that he had worked his last day at ESPN.

== Personal life ==
Golic was born in Voorhees, New Jersey, to parents Mike and Christine Golic. His father Mike Golic was a defensive tackle in the National Football League where he played eight seasons. His uncle Bob Golic was a defensive tackle in the NFL for fourteen seasons and was named to three Pro Bowls and two All-Pro teams. His younger brother Jake Golic was a tight end at Notre Dame and for the Cincinnati Bearcats.

His father was the former co-host with Mike Greenberg of Mike & Mike on ESPN Radio. The show ended on November 17, 2017, and ten days later, Mike Jr. joined his father alongside Trey Wingo for the program, Golic and Wingo.
