= Arena Football League on ESPN =

- Presented by: (see below)
- Country of origin: United States

Production
- Running time: 3 hours

Original release
- Network: ESPN (1987–2002, 2007–2008, 2014–2019); ESPN2 (1995–1999, 2007–2008, 2014–2019); ESPNEWS (2014–2019); ESPN3 (2014–2019); ABC (1998–2002, 2007–2008); ESPN Deportes (2016–2019)
- Release: 1987 – 2019

Arena Football League on ESPN was a presentation of the Arena Football League with games airing on ESPN, ESPN2, ESPNEWS, ESPN3 and ESPN Deportes. As with all other sports broadcasting on the ESPN family of networks, all arena football games had aired on The WatchESPN App. It was previously aired from 1987 until 2002 and then again from 2007 until 2008. When the league folded in 2019, the contract was over.

== History ==
=== 1987–1988, 1992–2002 ===
ESPN was the original broadcaster for Arena Football games, showing games live in the league's first two seasons, 1987 and 1988. ESPN signed a six-year contract with the AFL in 1987, but was given the option to opt out of the contract if they were not getting the rating they wanted.

Partially because of turmoil within the league itself, ESPN did not broadcast Arena Football again until 1992, when they broadcast six games and the ArenaBowl on an overnight, tape delay basis. Starting in 1993, ESPN started showing games live or at least not during overnight hours.

When ESPN2 was formed, the telecasts began to air more frequently on the new network. ESPN2 began televising a more standard schedule of Arena Football League regular season and playoff games from 1995–1999.

ESPN subsequently began televising AFL playoff games from 2000-02.

It originally had aired the inaugural ArenaBowl live in 1987, while ABC (under the Wide World of Sports umbrella) aired the ArenaBowl five consecutive years from 1998–02.

=== 2007-2008 agreement ===
On December 19, 2006, ESPN and the Arena Football League agreed to a five-year agreement that includes extensive multimedia rights and a minimum of 26 televised games per season, beginning in 2007 and lasting until 2011. As part of the deal, ESPN purchased a minority stake, reportedly ten percent, in the AFL. The network will gain privileged financial information, but insists that it will not give the AFL more favorable coverage on shows like SportsCenter as a result. ESPN televised a minimum of 17 regular-season games and nine playoff games—including a minimum of three Wild Card games, three Divisional Playoff games, both Conference Championships and the ArenaBowl on ESPN, ESPN2 and ABC. ESPN had an exclusive window for weekly Monday night prime time games on ESPN2. Both the season opener and ArenaBowl were on ABC, where three wild card games, two divisional games and one conference championship were on ESPN and the seventeen regular season Monday night games, one wild card game, two divisional games and one conference championship game was all on ESPN2.

==== 2007 schedule ====
- (All times Eastern)

Week	Date	Time	Game	Score	Network
Week 1	Sunday, March 4, 2007	12:30pm	Chicago Rush at Kansas City Brigade	KC 54, CHI 41	ABC
Week 1	Sunday, March 4, 2007	12:30pm	Dallas Desperados at New York Dragons	DAL 60, NY 7	ABC
Week 2	Monday, March 12, 2007	7pm	Los Angeles Avengers at Orlando Predators	LA 44, ORL 37	ESPN2
Week 4	Thursday, March 22, 2007	7pm	Colorado Crush at Philadelphia Soul	PHI 71, COL 47	ESPN2
Week 4	Monday, March 26, 2007	7pm	Dallas Desperados at Orlando Predators	DAL 70, ORL 42	ESPN2
Week 5	Sunday, April 1, 2007	1:30pm	Los Angeles Avengers at Chicago Rush	CHI 66, LA 31	ESPN2
Week 6	Monday, April 9, 2007	7:30pm	Georgia Force at Philadelphia Soul	GA 57, PHI 49	ESPN2
Week 7	Monday, April 16, 2007	8pm	Philadelphia Soul at Dallas Desperados	PHI 41, DAL 51	ESPN2
Week 8	Monday, April 23, 2007	7:30pm	Philadelphia Soul at Columbus Destroyers	PHI 21, CLB 44	ESPN2
Week 9	Monday, April 30, 2007	8pm	Philadelphia Soul at Chicago Rush	PHI 43, CHI 54	ESPN2
Week 10	Monday, May 7, 2007	8pm	Colorado Crush at Chicago Rush	COL 48, CHI 59	ESPN2
Week 11	Monday, May 14, 2007	8:30pm	Chicago Rush at Dallas Desperados*	CHI 48, DAL 52	ESPN2
Week 12	Monday, May 21, 2007	7:30pm	New Orleans VooDoo at Philadelphia Soul	NO 34, PHI 78	ESPN2
Week 13	Monday, May 28, 2007	8pm	New York Dragons at New Orleans VooDoo	NY 69, NO 63	ESPN2
Week 14	Monday, June 4, 2007	10:30pm	Colorado Crush at Utah Blaze	COL 14, UTA 51	ESPN2
Week 15	Monday, June 11, 2007	10pm	Los Angeles Avengers at Arizona Rattlers	LA 55, ARI 52	ESPN2
Week 16	Monday, June 18, 2007	10pm	Chicago Rush at Colorado Crush	CHI 66, COL 57	ESPN2
Week 17	Monday, June 25, 2007	10pm	Dallas Desperados at Colorado Crush	DAL 77 COL 58	ESPN2
Wildcard	Friday, June 29, 2007	7pm	Orlando Predators at Philadelphia Soul	ORL 26, PHI 41	ESPN
Wildcard	Saturday, June 30, 2007	12pm	Columbus Destroyers at Tampa Bay Storm	CLB 56 TB 55	ESPN
Wildcard	Saturday, June 30, 2007	3pm	Colorado Crush at Kansas City Brigade	COL 49, KC 42	ESPN
Wildcard	Monday, July 2, 2007	10pm	Utah Blaze at Los Angeles Avengers	UTA 42, LA 64	ESPN2
Divisional	Saturday, July 7, 2007	3pm	Colorado Crush at San Jose SaberCats	COL 67 SJ 76	ESPN
Divisional	Saturday, July 7, 2007	8pm	Columbus Destroyers at Dallas Desperados	CLB 66 DAL 59	ESPN
Divisional	Sunday, July 8, 2007	7pm	Philadelphia Soul at Georgia Force	PHI 39 GEO 65	ESPN2
Divisional	Monday, July 9, 2007	8:30pm	Los Angeles Avengers at Chicago Rush	LA 20 CHI 52	ESPN2
Conference Championship	Saturday, July 14, 2007	1pm	Columbus Destroyers at Georgia Force	CLB 66 GEO 56	ESPN*
Conference Championship	Saturday, July 14, 2007	4pm	Chicago Rush at San Jose SaberCats	CHI 49 SJ 61	ESPN*
ArenaBowl XXI	Sunday, July 29, 2007	3pm	Columbus Destroyers at San Jose SaberCats	CLB 33 SJ 55	ABC

*Schedule change

===== Controversy =====
Some AFL fans complained that the TV schedule “inequitably favored teams” such as the Philadelphia Soul, Chicago Rush, and Colorado Crush, teams whose ownerships include, respectively, Jon Bon Jovi, Mike Ditka and John Elway. 14 of the 17 ESPN games had at least Chicago, Philadelphia or Colorado playing. The Soul (whose part-owner and team president is former AFL on ESPN analyst Ron Jaworski) have appeared in seven of the 17 regular season games on ESPN platforms, more than any other team in the league. This criticism was also present when NBC went out of their way to not let some teams appear on their schedule. In 2008, the Chicago Rush have nine regular season games on ESPN and ABC, while the 2007 Arena Bowl Champion San Jose SaberCats have just one, week one against the Chicago Rush, and the New York Dragons had 1, a 10:30 game versus the Colorado Crush. Other criticism includes the scheduling of games on various days and times, as opposed to a weekly AFL gameday.

=== 2015–2019 ===
ESPN returned to the AFL (in 2014) as broadcast partners, with weekly games shown on ESPN, ESPN2, ESPNEWS, and all other games available live and free on ESPN3. ESPN Deportes and ESPN Latin America had broadcast AFL games in Spanish from 2016 to 2019, when the league folded.

== Personalities ==
Former broadcasters of the AFL on ESPN and ABC included Mike Gleason, Gary Danielson, Brent Musburger, Merril Hoge, and Holly Rowe.

=== 2007 ===
Early on, ESPN said they would use "some prominent faces in the broadcast booth" and ended up going with the duo of Mike Greenberg and Mike Golic from ESPN Radio and ESPN2's Mike and Mike in the Morning for their number one team. The second team will consist of NFL Live's Trey Wingo and Mark Schlereth with the third being Ron Jaworski and Merril Hoge. In May 2007, Mark Jones replaced Jaworski, who focuses on his new Monday Night Football role. Jay Rothman, producer of Monday Night Football, and Bryan Ryder will also produce the Monday night Arena Football games on ESPN2. The announcements were made on January 16, 2007.

Team	Play-by-play	Analyst(s)	Field reporter	Producer(s)
1	Mike Greenberg	Mike Golic		Jay Rothman; Bryan Ryder
2	Trey Wingo	Mark Schlereth		Jay Rothman; Bryan Ryder
3	Mark Jones	Merril Hoge		Jay Rothman; Bryan Ryder
4	Dave Pasch	Ray Bentley		Jay Rothman; Bryan Ryder

The other play-by-play announcer used on playoff games is Bob Wischusen.

=== 2008 ===
Pasch, Wischusen, and Bentley returned to their respective roles while Marcellus Wiley and Shaun King joined as color commentators. The tandems of Greenberg-Golic and Wingo-Schlereth would not reprise their roles as play-by-play men in 2008.

The replays of classic Arena Football games that had aired on ESPN Classic in 2007 would also be dropped in 2008.

== See also ==
- The AFL on NBC
