= NFL Tour =

2008 video game

- PlayStation 3 Cover
- Developer(s): EA Tiburon
- Publisher(s): EA Sports BIG
- Platform(s): PlayStation 3, Xbox 360
- Release: NA: January 8, 2008; EU: February 1, 2008 (X360); AU: February 7, 2008 (X360); EU: February 8, 2008 (PS3)
- Genre(s): Sports, Football
- Mode(s): Single-player, Multiplayer

NFL Tour is an arcade football video game. It was released on January 8, 2008. It was developed by EA Tiburon and published by Electronic Arts under the EA Sports BIG division of EA Sports, which is also responsible for such titles as SSX, NBA Street, NFL Street, and the FIFA Street games. The game could be considered a successor to the NFL Street franchise, but it was converted to the new hardware (PlayStation 3 / Xbox 360). Trey Wingo from ESPN is the game's voice announcer.

== Cover ==
In 2007, a fan vote decided which NFL player would be on the game's cover. The candidates were defensive ends Dwight Freeney of the Indianapolis Colts and Jason Taylor of the Miami Dolphins, and linebacker Shawne Merriman of the San Diego Chargers. Merriman was later named the cover athlete.

== Reception ==
The game received mostly negative reviews.

Aaron Thomas of GameSpot said, "NFL Tour would have made a great arcade game, but as a console game, it's simply too shallow to hold your interest for long." He complained that the game suffered from being "light on game modes", and lack of "depth". He scored the game a 5/10. Ultimately, he concluded, "If you're cool with spending $40 on a few hours of entertainment—go to town, but don't say you weren't warned. However, if you don't like wasting money, take a pass on this one altogether and pick up an old copy of NFL Street (or even NFL Blitz) if you need an arcade football fix."

Jeff Haynes of IGN said "For a title that's being shown on the two most powerful console systems available, the game doesn't really take advantage of the visual capabilities of either one." Of the game's playability, he said "missing tricks, gamebreakers and character progression or squad creation, this is an incredibly weak NFL title. At least you don't have to shake the controller for reversals." He ultimately scored the game a 4.7/10. Haynes concluded, "the largest draw of playing the game is the multiplayer. Otherwise, if you manage to go through the Tour mode once, you're not going to touch this game again."
