= Duel (British game show) =

2008 British television quiz show

- Created by: French TV
- Presented by: Nick Hancock
- Country of origin: United Kingdom
- Original language: English
- No. of series: 1
- No. of episodes: 12

Production
- Running time: 60mins (inc. adverts)
- Production company: Gallowgate Productions

Original release
- Network: ITV
- Release: 19 January – 5 April 2008

Related
- Duel

Duel is an ITV game show based on a format by Francophone production company French TV, hosted by Nick Hancock, broadcast on Saturday evenings. It ran from 19 January to 5 April 2008.

== Format ==
Each 'Duel' consists of two contestants, who each begin the game with 10 chips. They are asked multiple-choice general knowledge questions with four possible answers. Contestants are given an unlimited amount of time to cover at least one answer using their chips, one per answer, providing if they have enough chips. The contestant confirms their choices by pressing their "lock" button, after which the answers are locked in place and no further changes can be made. A partition is raised at the start of each question and is lowered down after both contestants lock their answers. One of the four answers is correct; any chip placed on an incorrect answer is discarded from the table, and £1,000 per chip is added to the progressive jackpot starting at £100,000.

Each contestant is given two 'Accelerators' (similar to the 'press' in the American version of the show), imposing on their opponent a seven-second time limit; any answers covered after these seven seconds are automatically locked in. Using an accelerator before locking in answers wastes it with no effect. If the contestant still had their second accelerator available, Hancock would inform them that they could still lock their answers and play the other accelerator if they see fit.

The duel continues so long as both contestants cover any correct answers. If any contestant fails to cover the correct answer, the duel ends and the contestant is eliminated. If neither contestant covers the correct answer, both contestants are eliminated and the duel ends without a winner.

After a duel, the winning contestant selects one of any three opponents, with limited information as such provided by the contestant (name, job and the age), to initiate a new duel and the process is repeated. Any unselected opponents will remain on the list of opponents until selected.

For the first four shows of the series, a back-to-back 'Duel' victory offered the contestant a choice to leave with their winnings or to play Cash or Chips. They were asked to randomly select one of two chips to be flipped over. The chips are either marked with "£" (a fixed sum of £10,000 for two 'Duel' victories, £20,000 for three) or "%" - (10% of the jackpot for two 'Duel' victories, 20% of the jackpot for three; amounts are neither affected nor deducted from the jackpot in either case). The contestant then choose to either retire by accepting the offer or decline it for one more 'Duel' for more winnings or a shot at the jackpot.

As of show five, the rules are changed for winners with back-to-back 'Duel' wins, where they are offered a bonus question in which they are given three chips to cover the correct answer within seven seconds for a cash bonus depending on how many chips they placed. A correct answer awarded £10,000 if they played only one chip, £5,000 for two and £2,500 for three. A third win offered another bonus question with the cash bonus doubled.

In all shows, contestants with four consecutive 'Duel' victories would retire undefeated and claims the jackpot, after which it resets back to £100,000. If the Duel either produced no winners or if the champion retires, the two contestants who waited the most time in the waiting list become new challengers.

== Jackpot winners ==
The first ever Duel jackpot winner was Robert, a social worker from Blackpool in Lancashire, who correctly identified that the US Masters is the only major golf tournament to be held at the same venue each year. He won the £470,000 jackpot that had built up since the start of the series, and also took home his accumulated accelerator wins of £12,500, giving him a total of £482,500.

On 29 March 2008, the jackpot was won for the second time by banking lecturer Rob, scooping £215,000 (£190,000 jackpot plus £25,000 accumulated accelerator wins).

A week later, on the final show of the series, firefighter James won the third Duel jackpot of £166,000, plus his accelerator win of £20,000; a total of £186,000.

=== List of winners ===
Show	Date	Contestant	Duels won	Chip revealed after duel 2	Prize won	Jackpot total
1	19 January 2008	Matt	2	£	£10,000	£155,000
2	26 January 2008	Donna	2	%	£17,000	£206,000
4	9 February 2008	Maurice	2	£	£10,000	£303,000

From show 5 onwards, following Maurice Daniels' accident (according to the rule changes outlined above):

Show	Date	Contestant	Duels won	Accelerators won	Prize won	Jackpot total
5	16 February 2008	Wanda	2	1	£10,000	£332,000
8	8 March 2008	Robert	4	2	£482,500	£470,000
11	29 March 2008	Rob	4	2	£215,000	£190,000
12	5 April 2008	James	4	1	£186,000	£166,000

== Reception ==
Readers of ukgameshows.com named it the best new game show of 2008 in their "Hall of fame" poll.
