= Golic and Wingo =

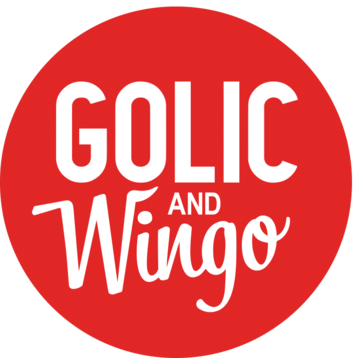
- Genre: Sports talk radio
- Running time: 4 hours (6:00 am – 10:00 am)
- Country of origin: United States
- Home station: ESPN Radio
- Syndicates: ESPN Radio affiliates
- TV adaptations: ESPN2 (2017–2018: four hours; 2018-2020: first two hours; ESPNEWS (2018–2020: four hours)
- Starring: Mike Golic, Sr.; Trey Wingo; Mike Golic, Jr.
- Recording studio: ESPN Studio - 935 Middle Street, Bristol, CT
- Original release: November 27, 2017 – July 31, 2020
- Website: Golic and Wingo
- Podcast: http://www.espn.com/espnradio/podcast/archive?id=2445552

Golic and Wingo was an American sports-talk radio show that was hosted by Mike Golic, Sr., his son Mike Jr. and co-host Trey Wingo that aired on the ESPN networks. The show was carried on ESPN Radio and simulcast on television on ESPNEWS since April 2, 2018 (prior to this, it was simulcast on ESPN2), and acted as the morning show for both the radio and television sides of the production. Outside of a few radio stations that were able to move or decline carriage of the show for their own local morning productions (or for daytime-only operations, may not be able to carry), Golic and Wingo was effectively a compulsory element of the ESPN Radio schedule, which all affiliates of the network were required to carry and was the premier morning show on ESPN.

The show started on November 27, 2017, and succeeded Mike & Mike, with Golic's previous co-host, Mike Greenberg leaving the show on November 17, 2017 for a morning show on ESPN called Get Up! (which premiered on April 2, 2018) after an 18-year run together.

ESPN announced that Golic and Wingo would be ending on July 31, 2020. Mike Golic retired from ESPN Radio after the final Golic and Wingo show on July 31, 2020. At the time, there was no show announced for Trey Wingo (he is no longer at ESPN as of September 4, 2020), while Mike Golic Jr. joined Chiney Ogwumike for their new late afternoon radio show, Chiney & Golic Jr., which started on August 17, 2020.

As for the Golic and Wingo show itself, it was replaced with Keyshawn, JWill & Zubin, which also debuted August 17, 2020.
