= Arena Football League on television =

Jim Foster, a promotions manager with the National Football League (NFL), conceived the idea of indoor football while watching an indoor association football match at Madison Square Garden in 1981. While at the game, he wrote his idea on a 9x12 envelope from his briefcase with sketches of the field and notes on gameplay. He presented the idea to a few friends at the NFL offices, where he received praise and encouragement for his concept. After solidifying the rules and business plan, supplemented with sketches by a professional artist, Foster presented his idea to various television networks; he reached an agreement with NBC for a "test game".

== Historical breakdown ==
=== 1980s ===
ESPN was the original broadcaster for Arena Football games, showing games live in the league's first two seasons, 1987 and 1988. ESPN signed a six-year contract with the AFL in 1987, but was given the option to opt out of the contract if they were not getting the rating they wanted.

The Prime Network, the forerunner to the Fox Sports Networks (officially starting on November 1, 1996, when the Prime Network names were dropped for the FSN name nationwide) broadcast the ArenaBowl from 1989–1991. Dave Enet and Bill Land served as play-by-play men and Howard Balzer and Tony Hill served as color commentators. Jim Grabowski served as a sideline reporter for ArenaBowl IV in 1990.

=== 1990s ===
Partially because of turmoil within the league itself, ESPN did not broadcast Arena Football again until 1992, when they broadcast six games and the ArenaBowl on an overnight, tape delay basis. Starting in 1993, ESPN started showing games live or at least not during overnight hours.

When ESPN2 was formed, the telecasts began to air more frequently on the new network. ESPN2 began televising a more standard schedule of Arena Football League regular season and playoff games from 1995–1999.

It originally had aired the inaugural ArenaBowl live in 1987, while ABC (under the Wide World of Sports umbrella) aired the ArenaBowl five consecutive years from 1998–02.

=== 2000s ===
The year 2000 brought a heightened interest in the AFL after Kurt Warner, who spent three years as quarterback of the AFL's Iowa Barnstormers, rose to fame as starting quarterback for The Greatest Show on Turf, the Super Bowl-winning offense of the then-St. Louis Rams. While many sports commentators and fans continued to ridicule the league, Warner's story gave the league positive exposure, and it brought the league a new television deal with TNN, who would televise regular season games live on Sunday afternoons.

The TNN deal coincided with the league's emergence as one with a major presence on the North American continent. Major markets such as Chicago, Detroit, Dallas, and Los Angeles, each of which had lacked franchises for many years, returned to the league, it received its first and only franchise in Canada (the Toronto Phantoms), and teams in smaller markets such as Albany and Iowa were relocated. In 2001, the league peaked at 19 teams.

Included in the deal for the league was the right to broadcast the ArenaCup, the championship for the newly established arenafootball2, conceived as a minor league for metropolitan areas too small to support arena football as a major sport. ArenaCups I and II were carried on TNN.

ESPN subsequently began televising AFL playoff games from 2000-02. TNN's coverage of the AFL also ended after the 2002 season. TNN itself was moving away from live sports, at the time transitioning to a network named Spike TV.

The Chicago Rush originally had games broadcast on the now defunct Fox Sports Net Chicago during its first two seasons from 2001 to 2002 with mostly Saturday night telecasts. When the AFL signed with NBC from 2003 to 2006, the Rush was one of the most prominently featured teams during the national NBC broadcasts as well as playoff games and the majority of Chicago's games moved to Sunday afternoons. A few of the games not picked up by NBC remained on FSN Chicago until 2006. Beginning in the 2007 season, the AFL began a TV partnership with ESPN and FSN Chicago went under and Comcast SportsNet Chicago took its place. Once again the Rush were widely featured during the national ESPN telecasts on Monday nights and Sunday afternoons.

The regional Chicago telecasts went to Comcast SportsNet. From 2001 to 2008, the Rush games were broadcast by Tom Dore and former Chicago Bears offensive lineman James "Big Cat" Williams. The radio deals bounced between 670 The Score and ESPN Radio 1000.

==== The AFL comes to NBC ====
In 2003, NBC obtained the broadcast rights (on a revenue sharing basis) and a minority interest in the Arena Football League. In conjunction with this, the league moved the beginning of the season from May to February (the week after the NFL's Super Bowl) and scheduled most of its games on Sunday afternoons instead of Friday or Saturday evenings as it had in the past. These moves were directly marketed to those seeking more football after the Super Bowl ended; advertisements for NBC's arena football coverage dubbed this phenomenon "post-Super Bowl stress disorder, or pissed" (thus openly using one of the seven dirty words). The network televised weekly games on a regional basis, as well as the entire playoff slate. The deal lasted four years, after which the league and NBC parted ways.

NBC's coverage received sharp criticism from some longtime AFL fans and owners such as Jon Bon Jovi. The complaints were mostly because the network had severely cut back from their initial promotion of the AFL in 2003 and 2004, to barely promoting it at all in 2005 and 2006. NBC also tended to massively advertise select teams such as the Philadelphia Soul, Chicago Rush, Colorado Crush and the Dallas Desperados, while smaller-market teams such as the Austin Wranglers, San Jose SaberCats, Grand Rapids Rampage and the then-Columbus Destroyers were massively underpromoted or not broadcast at all.

FSN would carry more than 100 telecasts in 2004, including eight games on Fox–owned Sunshine Network (now Sun Sports), with 15 of the 17 teams appearing a minimum of five times. All 17 teams would have at least two games televised through this agreement.

In addition, FSN would continue producing and televising AFL WEEKLY, a weekly magazine program that premiered on the network in the previous season.

The Fox Sports Networks agreement had some of the revenue-sharing aspects in common with the two-year deal that the AFL had with NBC. FSN, like NBC, didn't pay rights fees to carry the games. The network instead, split ad revenue with the AFL; NBC split ad revenue 50–50 with the league, and the Fox deal was similar but apparently not 50-50. The agreement calls for FSN to produce the game telecasts, and both the AFL and FSN will work together to sell advertising inventory. Once FSN reimbursed for its production costs, the two organizations would share ad revenue. The agreement, combined with individual team broadcasting agreements, increased the number of AFL non-NBC games on television from 39 in 2004 to more than 120 in 2005. Most FSN regional telecasts took place on Fridays and Saturdays, and were in addition to the AFL's exclusive Sunday afternoon national window on NBC.

For the 2006 season, the AFL struck a cable agreement with OLN (now NBC Sports Network) to broadcast 11 weekly regular-season games and one Wild Card playoff game. However, the agreement was not renewed and was later picked up by ESPN, which also acquired a minority ownership stake in the league.

In 2006, due to the XX Winter Olympic Games, the Stanley Cup Playoffs, and the Daytona 500, NBC reduced its coverage of AFL games from weekly broadcast to scattered coverage during the regular season, albeit with an extensive playoff schedule ending with ArenaBowl XX. For that season, some games were moved to OLN, now known as NBC Sports Network (eleven regular-season games and one playoff game).

NBC's broadcast of ArenaBowl XX in 2006 earned NBC a considerably disappointing 0.7% of the U.S. households; the small audience for the 2006 ArenaBowl was the culmination of a season that earned NBC 0.9% of the U.S. households. This was down from the inaugural 2003 season of The AFL on NBC, which earned a 1.1% share; in contrast, even at its lowest, the XFL, which aired in 2001, was drawing 1.6% of U.S. households for its NBC broadcasts.

On June 30, 2006, the Arena Football League and NBC Sports failed to reach an agreement to extend their broadcasting contract, ending the network's association with the AFL after four years. League commissioner David Baker said regarding the end of the partnership, "NBC has been a great partner. We are forever grateful to them for exhibiting our game with the utmost respect and integrity. We wish them well, but are also excited to begin a new chapter that will continue our unprecedented growth." NBC Sports president Ken Schanzer responded, "Unfortunately we were unable to reach an agreement. We've enjoyed our partnership with the Arena Football League. It's a great game with great people. We wish them all the best." In an interview with The New York Times, NBC spokesman Mike McCarley stated, "we gave Arena Football our best effort, with top production and significant promotion, but the ratings never grew."

During an August 2006 segment of Larry King's interview with owner Jon Bon Jovi, a new deal was hinted at being in development, one that would be superior to its previous agreement with NBC. In December 2006, a deal was struck with ABC/ESPN to broadcast AFL regular season and playoff games. ESPN also assumed partial ownership of the league itself. Las Vegas Gladiators owner Jim Ferraro stated during a radio interview that the reason why a renewed deal with NBC failed was because ESPN refused to show highlights of the games or even mention a product being broadcast on NBC.

==== The end of the AFL's deal with NBC ====
As previously mentioned, on December 19, 2006, ESPN and the Arena Football League agreed to a five-year agreement that includes extensive multimedia rights and a minimum of 26 televised games per season, beginning in 2007 and lasting until 2011. As part of the deal, ESPN purchased a minority stake, reportedly ten percent, in the AFL. The network will gain privileged financial information, but insists that it will not give the AFL more favorable coverage on shows like SportsCenter as a result. ESPN televised a minimum of 17 regular-season games and nine playoff games—including a minimum of three Wild Card games, three Divisional Playoff games, both Conference Championships and the ArenaBowl on ESPN, ESPN2 and ABC. ESPN had an exclusive window for weekly Monday night prime time games on ESPN2. Both the season opener and ArenaBowl were on ABC, where three wild card games, two divisional games and one conference championship were on ESPN and the seventeen regular season Monday night games, one wild card game, two divisional games and one conference championship game was all on ESPN2.

Some AFL fans complained that the TV schedule “inequitably favored teams” such as the Philadelphia Soul, Chicago Rush, and Colorado Crush, teams whose ownerships include, respectively, Jon Bon Jovi, Mike Ditka and John Elway. 14 of the 17 ESPN games had at least Chicago, Philadelphia or Colorado playing. The Soul (whose part-owner and team president is former AFL on ESPN analyst Ron Jaworski) have appeared in seven of the 17 regular season games on ESPN platforms, more than any other team in the league. This criticism was also present when NBC went out of their way to not let some teams appear on their schedule. In 2008, the Chicago Rush have nine regular season games on ESPN and ABC, while the 2007 Arena Bowl Champion San Jose SaberCats have just one, week one against the Chicago Rush, and the New York Dragons had 1, a 10:30 game versus the Colorado Crush. Other criticism includes the scheduling of games on various days and times, as opposed to a weekly AFL gameday.

=== 2010s ===
In 2009, the Arena Football League suspended operations to refinance and restructure its business plan. After a one-year layoff, the AFL and Chicago Rush returned in 2010 with a single entity model. On December 10, 2009, it was announced that the Rush will be returning for 2010 under new ownership as a member of Arena Football 1. The ownership obtained the rights to the name after a court auction granted the AF1 control of the AFL's assets. Two months later, the AF1 decided to adopt the former Arena Football League name.

When the Rush returned in 2010, the AFL signed its TV deal with NFL Network, but the Rush were not featured as often as they had been with ESPN and NBC, averaging between 2 and 3 telecasts a year on NFL Network in 2010 and 2011, but were shutout from the national spotlight in 2012. Occasionally region games air on CSN and WGN's CLTV, and all AFL games are streamed for free online through UStream.

Chicago returned to the field on April 2, 2010, on the road against the Iowa Barnstormers. The game was broadcast on the NFL Network and Chicago won 61–43. The Rush began the season 4–0 and were in first place in the division at 10–4. However, the team lost its last two games, first to the 1–13 Dallas Vigilantes and then closed out the year on the road losing to the Spokane Shock. It cost the team a chance at the division title and forced the team to go on the road for the playoffs. The team ended the regular season at 10–6, and lost to the Milwaukee Iron in the playoffs.

The NFL Network broadcast the regular season each Friday night and went through the playoffs, culminating with the ArenaBowl. All AFL games not on the NFL Network could be seen for free online, provided by Ustream.

NFL Network ceased airing Arena Football League games partway through the 2012 season as a result of ongoing labor problems within the league. The remaining games in the season were carried on a tape delay to prevent the possibility of the players staging a work stoppage immediately prior to a scheduled broadcast and the resulting embarrassment. Once the labor issues were resolved, the NFL Network resumed the practice of broadcasting a live Friday night game. ) before the network dropped the league outright at the end of the season. The rights were picked up by CBS Sports.

==== The AFL aligns with CBS Sports ====
As part of a two-year agreement, the CBS Sports Network aired nineteen regular season games and two playoff games. When CBS aired ArenaBowl XXVI, it marked the first time since 2008 that the league's finale aired on network television.

Regular season CBSSN broadcast games were usually on Saturday nights. As the games were shown live, the start times were not uniform as with most football broadcast packages, but varied with the time zone in which the home team was located. This meant that the AFL may have appeared either prior to or following the CBSSN's featured Major League Lacrosse game.

ESPN would be returning to the AFL (starting in 2014) as broadcast partners, with weekly games being shown on ESPN, ESPN2, ESPNEWS, and all other games available live and free on ESPN3. ESPN Deportes and ESPN Latin America will start to broadcast AFL games in Spanish as of the 2016 season.

For the 2017 season, one AFL game per week was broadcast live nationally over CBS Sports Network. In 2017, the AFL also began streaming some games on Twitter and AFLNow, the league's streaming service. For the 2018 season, the AFL's sole national English language telecast partner was the CBS Sports Network, but all games were streamed free online and Brigade and Valor games were available over their owner Ted Leonsis' Monumental Sports Network.

As of 2019, CBS Sports no longer airs Arena Football League games.
