= Arena Football League on NFL Network =

NFL Network held the broadcast television rights the revived Arena Football League from 2010 to 2012. NFL Network broadcast a weekly Friday Night Football package every week at 8:00 ET, with the season running from March to August. The NFL stated that unlike when the NFL last showed interest in arena football, there would be no attempts to buy into the league.

== Broadcast overview ==
As previously mentioned, the NFL Network broadcast the regular season each Friday and went through the playoffs, culminating with the ArenaBowl. All AFL games not on the NFL Network could be seen for free online, provided by Ustream.

NFL Network ceased airing Arena Football League games partway through the 2012 season as a result of ongoing labor problems within the league. The remaining games in the season were carried on a tape delay to prevent the possibility of the players staging a work stoppage immediately prior to a scheduled broadcast and the resulting embarrassment. Once the labor issues were resolved, the NFL Network resumed the practice of broadcasting a live Friday night game before the network dropped the league outright at the end of the season. The rights were picked up by CBS Sports.

=== Commentators ===
Broadcasters included Kurt Warner, Tom Waddle, Paul Burmeister, Fran Charles, Charles Davis, and Ari Wolfe.

=== Notable moments ===
In 2009, the Arena Football League suspended operations to refinance and restructure its business plan. After a one-year layoff, the AFL and Chicago Rush returned in 2010 with a single entity model. On December 10, 2009, it was announced that the Rush will be returning for 2010 under new ownership as a member of Arena Football 1. The ownership obtained the rights to the name after a court auction granted the AF1 control of the AFL's assets. Two months later, the AF1 decided to adopt the former Arena Football League name.

Chicago returned to the field on April 2, 2010 on the road against the Iowa Barnstormers. The game was broadcast on the NFL Network and Chicago won 61–43. The Rush began the season 4–0 and were in first place in the division at 10–4. However, the team lost its last two games, first to the 1–13 Dallas Vigilantes and then closed out the year on the road losing to the Spokane Shock. It cost the team a chance at the division title and forced the team to go on the road for the playoffs. The team ended the regular season at 10–6, and lost to the Milwaukee Iron in the playoffs.
