= Duel (American game show) =

- Genre: Quiz show
- Written by: Jamison Selby (2007)
- Directed by: Mark Gentile (2007); Michael Dempsey (2008)
- Presented by: Mike Greenberg
- Composer: David Vanacore
- Country of origin: United States
- No. of seasons: 2
- No. of episodes: 16

Production
- Executive producers: Gail Berman; Lloyd Braun; Chris Cowan; Jean-Michel Michenaud; Charles Duncombe; David Rosconval; Francis Vacher; R.A. Clark
- Producer: Tim Bock
- Production location: Walt Disney Studios
- Editors: Barry Murphy; Jonathan Siegel; Jason Steinberg; Craig A. Colten; Travis Greene; Steven Friedland; Ken Lamere; Nick Dan Vito; Tim Preston; Steven Escobar; Alexandra Konisaurk; Jane Fleck; Rick Livingston; Jarrod Howell
- Camera setup: Multi-camera
- Running time: ≈61 minutes (Dec. 17-18) ≈44 minutes (All other episodes)
- Production companies: Rocket Science Laboratories; French TV; BermanBraun

Original release
- Network: ABC
- Release: December 17, 2007 – July 25, 2008

Related
- Duel UK

Duel is an American game show hosted by Mike Greenberg that first aired from December 17 to December 23, 2007, on ABC. The show aired as a week-long six-episode tournament at 8:00 p.m. (7:00 p.m. Central) from Monday through Friday with the finale on Sunday.

The show's website described the program as a cross between Who Wants to Be a Millionaire? and the World Series of Poker. The game was played in a head-to-head format in which contestants answered general trivia questions. The first season uses a tournament format with a progressive jackpot which accumulates for every incorrect answers covered; the top four contestants are invited to the finale aired December 23, 2007 cumulating to the champion claiming the entire jackpot.

The second season aired in a weekly format with modified rules from April 4 to July 25, 2008, at 9:00 p.m. (8:00 p.m. Central). This time, the returning champions format was used and winning contestants compete a series of up to five duels for a $500,000 grand prize.

Both seasons were sponsored by Diet Pepsi Max led by Russell Findlay, the Pepsi marketing executive who launched Pepsi Max in the USA.

== Gameplay ==
=== Season 1 ===
Each player began a duel with ten chips, each worth $5,000 (for a total of $50,000). Each question was a multiple choice question with four choices. The question was read by the host while the contestants used their chips to cover choices, one chip per choice. They were allowed to cover any number of choices, provided they had enough chips; the contestant then locked their answers, after which the chips are sunk in place and no further changes may be made. A partition is raised at the start of each question, after which it is lowered once both players had locked in their answers, allowing the contestants to see each other's choices. Only one answer is correct. Contestants retained chips placed on correct answers, while chips placed on the wrong answers are removed from play and their value added towards the progressive jackpot.

Questions normally had no time limit, but after locking in, a contestant could "press" the opponent and impose a seven-second time limit, after which answers would be automatically locked in. Each contestant was given two presses per duel.

The duel continued as long as both contestants covered a correct answer. If one contestant failed to do so, the duel ended and that contestant was eliminated, and the value of any unused chips do not accumulate towards the jackpot. The winning contestant receives the value of the chips they retained; those winnings were theirs to keep regardless of results of future duels.

If neither contestant covered the correct answer, a sudden death "shootout" is played. Contestants are given four new chips (with no monetary value), and no presses are allowed. The contestant who answered correctly (with fewer choices) wins the duel without any money; if both contestants correctly answered the question with the same number of chips, the question is then thrown out and a new question is given out until a winner is decided (which is unaired during broadcast).

The champion then chose a new challenger from a randomly selected group of three from the remaining members of the "Players Gallery" (those in the contestant pool who had not yet participated), based on a small amount of information revealed about each potential contestant.

After five nights, the four contestants who won the most duels (and if tied, based on the most accumulated winnings) were invited to the finale to vie for the jackpot. The top-seeded contestant compete in the first duel by selecting any one of the three finalists, while the unselected finalists competed in the second duel. Winners of each duel then compete in the third duel for the entire jackpot. Rules from the previous duels still applies, as well as their guaranteed winnings.

=== Season 2 ===
The game format was changed in the second season to accommodate continuing weekly episodes. Under this new format, the number of presses per duel was reduced to one. The chips had no monetary value, and there was no progressive jackpot; instead, the value of the duel increased as more questions were asked.

Questions asked	1	2	3	4	5	6	7	8	9	10+
Winnings	$1,000	$2,500	$5,000	$10,000	$15,000	$20,000	$25,000	$30,000	$40,000	$50,000

If both contestants missed a question, the value of the duel was frozen and the sudden-death shootout rules were followed as in Season 1. After the duel ended, the winner played a bonus "max question" with a single chip and seven seconds to answer. A correct answer doubled their winnings for the duel, with no penalty for an incorrect answer.

Unlike Season 1, the champion was not guaranteed to receive their entire winnings total. After playing the max question, they had to decide whether to retire and keep their money or risk it on another duel, choosing one of three opponents based on a small amount of information about each. A champion who was defeated before winning three duels lost all their winnings; champions who lost after three or more victories lost half their winnings. A champion who won five consecutive duels retired undefeated and had their winnings augmented to $500,000. If a champion either retired or chose to leave the show, the two contestants who were not chosen in the previous duel played against each other.

=== Winners ===
In the first season format, the winner of the $1,720,000 jackpot went to Ashlee Register, while Robert Elswick became the runner-up. Her winnings totaled to $1,795,000, including the $75,000 she had earned in previous duels, which made her the highest-winning female American game show contestant to date. The final duel lasted only one question, and while Register covered every single answer, Elswick covered all the incorrect options, leaving the correct one uncovered.

Under the returning champions format, only one contestant, Gabriel Reilich, a former film executive for Reason Pictures / GOOD Magazine, won five consecutive duels for $500,000. Prior to the final duel he had $75,000 and had correctly answered every Max question he had been asked. The final duel against Jennifer lasted five questions. Reilich covered the correct answer with his only remaining chip, while Jennifer, with three chips, covered the other remaining answers.

== Broadcast history ==
Duel was created by the Francophone production house FrenchTV, with BermanBraun being the U.S. production firm. It is headed by Lloyd Braun and Gail Berman, both former network executives.

The series first aired from December 17 to December 23, 2007, on ABC at 8:00 PM (7:00 Central) from Monday through Friday and its finale on Sunday; for its first four nights, it was up against Clash of the Choirs on NBC.

Initial reviews were mixed; some praised the show for bringing something different and original to American television, while others derided Greenberg's hosting on the first night and the amount of "padding" the first episode (which was 90 minutes in length) seemed to have. Several critics derided the show for giving contestants "stereotypical" titles, such as "The Fire Captain" and "The Alligator Wrestler".

As the series progressed, however, critics began noticing how several contestants were chosen at random several times in a row, yet were never picked by the on-stage contestant; three contestants didn't play in the tournament at all.

=== Nielsen ratings ===
==== Season 1 ====
Duel's ratings were not as good as its opponent for its first four shows, NBC's Clash of the Choirs.

#	Air Date	Viewers (millions)	Households		Adults 18-49	
#	Air Date	Viewers (millions)	Rating	Share	Rating	Share
1	December 17, 2007	7.68	5.0	8	2.5	7
2	December 18, 2007	7.31	4.5	7	2.4	7
3	December 19, 2007	7.42	4.9	8	2.2	6
4	December 20, 2007	6.45	4.2	7	1.9	6
5	December 21, 2007	6.70	4.4	8	1.7	6
6	December 23, 2007	6.15	3.8	7	1.6	4

==== Season 2 ====
Season Two aired on Friday nights at 9:00 p.m. (8:00 p.m. Central). The first two episodes had to compete with CBS' The Price Is Right $1,000,000 Spectacular, which aired at the same time. Also since the season premiere, the show was standing and lagging at sixth place behind The CW's second hour of WWE Friday Night SmackDown and the Univision telenovela Pasíon.

#	Air Date	Viewers (millions)	Households		Adults 18-49	
#	Air Date	Viewers (millions)	Rating	Share	Rating	Share
7	April 4, 2008	3.93	2.5	3	1.2	4
8	April 11, 2008	3.99	2.6	5	1.2	4
9	April 18, 2008	3.29	2.1	4	0.9	3
10	April 25, 2008	3.73	2.4	4	1.0	3
11	May 2, 2008	3.86	2.6	5	1.0	3
12	June 27, 2008	3.27			1.0	4
13	July 4, 2008					
14	July 11, 2008	3.56			0.8	3
15	July 18, 2008					
16	July 25, 2008					

== International versions ==
Actually ITV in U.K. were the first network to purchase the rights to Duel in September 2007, swiftly followed by ABC in the U.S., who launched their first series of the show, hosted by sport broadcaster Mike Greenberg, on 17 December 2007. The American version ran 16 episodes in 2 seasons and was not renewed for a third season. France 2 was the third network to obtain the rights to the game show under the name Le 4e duel, aired on 2008 until 2013.

The Duel format was optioned by television networks in Australia, Belgium, Brazil, France, Germany, Hungary, Italy, Mexico, the Netherlands, Poland, Portugal and Spain, but, with the exception of Hungary, Portugal, and Duel's native France, never made it to production in those territories. A similar German game show called Duell was already running in 2001–2002 on the German sports channel DSF (today Sport1).

Country	Title	Presenter(s)	Broadcaster(s)	Premiere	Finale
Arab League	Duel BelArabi	(Egypt) Yousef Aamer	Abu Dhabi TV; ONTV	March 19, 2019	present
France	Le Quatrième Duel	Tania Young (2008); Julien Courbet (2009–2012); Bruno Guillon (2013)	France 2	July 5, 2008	September 7, 2013
Germany	Duell	Klaus Gronewald	DSF	2001	2002
Hungary	Párbaj	István Vágó	TV2	August 31, 2009	October 22, 2009
Portugal	O Duelo Final	Jorge Gabriel	RTP1	2009	2009
Spain	El Duelo	Antonio Garrido	Selected FORTA TV channels	2012	2012
United Kingdom	Duel	Nick Hancock	ITV	January 19, 2008	April 5, 2008

=== Hungarian version ===
The game is produced in Hungary titled Párbaj (Hungarian for Duel), starting on 31 August 2009 on TV2. It is hosted by István Vágó. It runs on weekdays from 19:05 to 20:15. After each duel, the winner it is given a bonus question with 3 tokens to use. Winnings are determined by the number of duels won and the number of tokens used in the bonus question (as long as the correct answer is chosen). The highest prize is possible after winning 5 duels and its value is 25 million forints. Players have 2 accelerators per duel. The phrase at the beginning of each duel is "En garde!".

A web version of the game is available on TV2's official website.

=== French version ===
France 2 was the third network to obtain the rights to the game show under the name Le 4e duel, aired on 2008 until 2013.
