= Trey Wingo =

American sports announcer (born 1963)

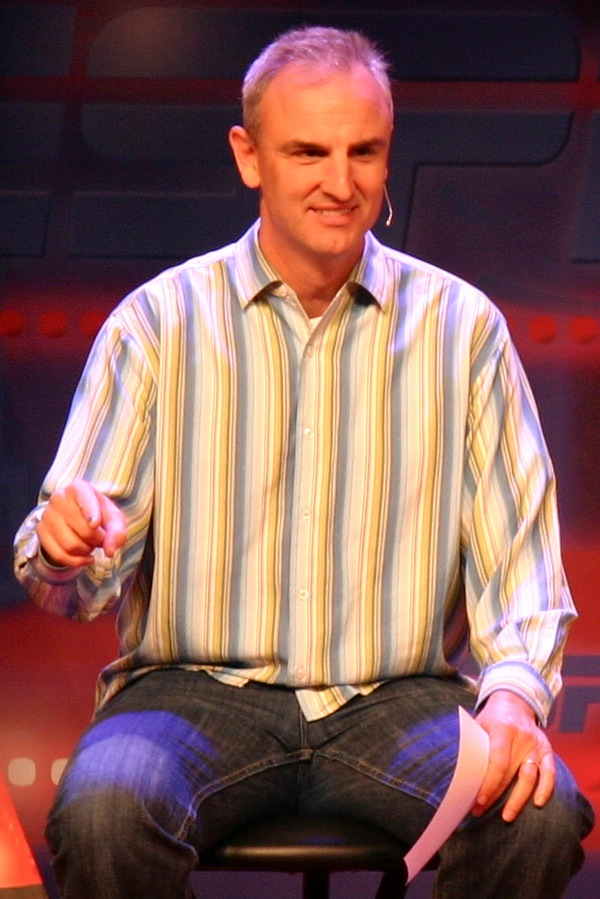
- Wingo on NFL Live in 2010
- Born: Hal Chapman Wingo III; September 19, 1963 (age 63)
- Education: Baylor University (B.A. Communications)
- Title: Chief NFL Analyst for Pro Football Network and Chief Trends Officer for Caesars Sportsbook
- Spouse: Janice Parmelee

Hal Chapman "Trey" Wingo III (/ˈwɪŋɡoʊ/; born September 19, 1963) is an American former co-host of ESPN Golic and Wingo, SportsCenter, and NFL Live. He has previously served as host of the Women's NCAA basketball tournament.

== Early life ==
Wingo is the son of Hal Wingo II, founding editor of People magazine. He grew up in Greenwich, Connecticut, where he attended high school with Steve Young, and attended Baylor University, where he was a member of the Phi Delta Theta fraternity. He graduated in 1985 with a bachelor's degree in communications.

== Broadcasting career ==
=== Pre-ESPN career ===
Wingo was a page for NBC based at their Rockefeller Center headquarters, where he worked on shows like Late Night with David Letterman and Saturday Night Live. He remained at the network, producing sports for NBC News at Sunrise before moving upstate to Binghamton, where he was sports director at WMGC-TV and WICZ-TV. He also worked at WFMZ-TV in Allentown, Pennsylvania; and KSDK in St. Louis, Missouri. He would return to national work in the fall of 1997 when joining ESPN.

=== ESPN (1997–2020) ===
Wingo was the play-by-play announcer for the Arena Football League on ESPN with Mark Schlereth. With Bob Ley he appeared on the lone September 11, 2001, segment of SportsCenter to announce that there would be no NFL games played that week.

He hosted NFL Primetime, which airs after Monday Night Football; NFL Live; and Who's No. 1?. On November 27, 2017, he became the co-host of the ESPN Radio morning show with Mike Golic, replacing Mike Greenberg upon the latter's departure for Get Up!, a new ESPN television show.

Wingo lent his voice and likeness to the video games ESPN NFL 2K5, in which he can be unlocked as a free agent; NFL Head Coach, in which he can be seen hosting a virtual NFL Live show; and NFL Tour, in which he serves as the play-by-play voice. He has also appeared in a campaign for the RW Sport luxury collection by Swiss watchmaker Raymond Weil. On September 4, 2020, it was announced Wingo left ESPN.

=== Pro Football Network (2021) ===
On March 13, 2021, Pro Football Network (PFN) announced that Wingo had joined the company as an equity partner, brand ambassador, and content provider.

Wingo hosts a podcast with PFN called More than Football: A Trey Wingo Podcast.

== Personal life ==
Wingo is married to Janice Parmelee with whom he has two kids. He became an official supporter of Ronald McDonald House Charities in 2007 and is a member of their celebrity board, called the Friends of RMHC. He works closely with the Prostate Cancer Foundation, the V Foundation for Cancer Research, the Special Olympics, and the Children's Hospital of Chicago.
