= Get Up (TV program) =

American sports talk morning television show on ESPN

- Presented by: Mike Greenberg
- Country of origin: United States
- No. of episodes: 565

Production
- Production locations: ESPN Studio, 7 Hudson Square, Manhattan, New York City
- Running time: 120 minutes
- Production company: ESPN

Original release
- Network: ESPN
- Release: April 2, 2018 – present

Related
- Mike & Mike

Get Up is an American sports talk morning television program hosted by Mike Greenberg that airs weekdays on ESPN. Michelle Beadle was one of the original hosts with Greenberg and Jalen Rose, but decided to leave the program in September 2018 to devote more time to ESPN's NBA coverage. It premiered on April 2, 2018. The program features news, opinion and analysis from the hosts and guests. It airs live weekdays from 8 am–10 am ET with reruns from 10 am–12 pm ET on ESPN2, and from 12 pm–2 pm ET on ESPNews (when ESPN has other sports programming commitments, ESPN2 will air the live feed in place of ESPN and ESPNEWS will reair the show in place of ESPN2), and also airs on SiriusXM live. Dan Graziano regularly fills in for Greenberg as host.

Prior to Get Up, Greenberg co-hosted the Mike & Mike radio show with Mike Golic but left in November 2017 after an 18-year run together. Golic's contract with ESPN expired at the end of 2020.

The show is broadcast from a newly built studio in Pier 17 at New York's South Street Seaport. The premiere was originally set for New Year's Day 2018, but construction delays at the new studio pushed it back to April 2.

The ratings for the show's live debut netted 283,000 viewers and dropped to 233,000 the next day.

In June 2025, it was announced that Get Up would move its production from ESPN's South Street Seaport Studios to the new ESPN facilities at 7 Hudson Square in Lower Manhattan. The move is scheduled to take place ahead of the June 9, 2025, broadcast, making Get Up the first ESPN program to air from the new headquarters. The relocation is part of ESPN and The Walt Disney Company's broader consolidation of their New York operations.

== Hosts ==
=== Current ===
- Mike Greenberg (2018–present)

=== Former ===
- Laura Rutledge (2019–2020)
- Jalen Rose (2018–2019)
- Michelle Beadle (2018)
