= Mike & Mike =

American sports-talk radio show

- Starring: Mike Greenberg; Mike Golic
- Country of origin: United States

Production
- Running time: 4 hours

Original release
- Network: ESPN Radio (2000–17); ESPN2 (2006–17); ESPNews (2004–05)
- Release: January 3, 2000 – November 17, 2017

Related
- The ESPN Radio Morning Show; Golic and Wingo; Get Up

Mike & Mike (formerly Mike & Mike in the Morning) was an American sports-talk radio show that was hosted by Mike Greenberg and Mike Golic on ESPN networks from 2000 to 2017. The show aired on ESPN Radio, and was simulcast on television, first on ESPNews starting in 2004, and later moving to ESPN2 in 2006.

The show primarily focused on the day's biggest sports topics and the humorous banter between the Mikes. It acted as the morning show for both the radio and television sides of the production. Outside of a few radio stations that are able to move or decline carriage of the show for their own local morning productions (or for daytime-only operations, may not be able to carry), Mike & Mike was effectively a compulsory element of the ESPN Radio schedule, which all affiliates of the network were required to carry.

On May 7, 2007, the show moved from its longtime radio studio home to the television studio used for Sunday NFL Countdown and Baseball Tonight, and began broadcasting in high-definition in 2007 as well.

A daily "best-of" show aired daily on ESPN2 and a weekly radio recap aired Saturday mornings at 6:00 a.m. to 7:00 a.m. and then moved to 5 a.m. ET before being discontinued in October 2009. The radio version of "best-of" returned in February 2010 in the 5am timeslot. In addition, there was a "best-of" podcast distributed every weekday as well. The show reaired on ESPNEWS immediately after the live simulcast.

On March 6, 2015, the duo celebrated 15 years of doing the show together. Mike & Mike were inducted into the NAB Broadcasting Hall of Fame on April 19, 2016.

On May 16, 2017, and after reports of acrimony between the hosts, it was announced that the show would be replaced by a new morning drive show hosted by Golic and Trey Wingo, with Greenberg moving to the main ESPN channel, where he hosts a morning show called Get Up!, which premiered on April 2, 2018. Greenberg's final day as co-host was November 17, 2017. On November 27, 2017, Mike & Mike's successor show, Golic and Wingo launched, with Trey Wingo becoming Golic's new co-host and Golic's son Mike Golic Jr. joining the show with his father.

== Design ==
The show centered on an "Odd Couple" relationship between its hosts, and how it related to their views on sports. The show's motto in its early years for all commercials on radio and television was: "What makes them different makes them great."

Mike Greenberg was portrayed as a stereotypical nerd and with a man-crush on whoever the starting quarterback was for his favorite team (the New York Jets), for whom he is openly partisan. Meanwhile, former Notre Dame and NFL lineman Mike Golic was set up in the role of the tough and boisterous "man's man," a former pro athlete who liked nothing more than to eat stereotypically unhealthy foods and "tell it like it is."

The former logo of Mike and Mike in the Morning until May 4, 2007.

=== Regular guest hosts and contributors ===
Even if either Greenberg or Golic (or even both) were absent from the show, the show still used the Mike and Mike title. On those days, guest hosts filled in, and the show followed the same format. Regular guest hosts included Adnan Virk, Ric Bucher, Marcellus Wiley, Mike Golic Jr., and regular contributors Buster Olney, Mark Schlereth, Cris Carter, Herman Edwards and Trey Wingo. Other regular contributors include Chris Mortensen, Tim Kurkjian, Dick Vitale, Tim Legler, and Jayson Stark.

The ESPN Radio SportsCenter updates during the show were done by Greenberg (or whoever was hosting in his place). Originally, they were done on ESPN Radio by Bob Picozzi or Christine Lisi. When the TV simulcast began broadcasting in HD, the radio SportsCenter updates were no longer simulcast on ESPN2, replaced by TV-specific SportsCenter updates, usually anchored by Sage Steele, Jonathan Coachman, Darren Lyn, George Smith or Michael Kim.

=== Greenberg and Golic on other ESPN and ABC ventures ===
The team of Greenberg and Golic had also worked in other ESPN ventures, including a game show (ESPN Bowling Night), and coverage of the Scripps National Spelling Bee. From 2000 to 2001, they were occasional panelists for the ESPN game show 2 Minute Drill. In 2007, they were the lead broadcast team for ESPN's coverage of the Arena Football League. It was announced in June 2007 that Greenberg and Golic would also call a National Football League game together for ESPN, broadcasting the second game of ESPN's Week 1 Monday Night Football doubleheader along with former NFL coach and player Mike Ditka. In June 2008, ESPN announced that the "Three Mikes" will return to broadcast the second game of the opening 2008 Monday Night Football doubleheader. Their last Monday Night Football assignment was in 2009.

The former logo of Mike and Mike in the Morning until 2013.

Starting on December 17, 2007, Greenberg also hosted the game show Duel. The show lasted for 16 episodes. The first six episodes were part of a first season high-stakes tournament, while the remaining ten episodes focused on a weekly series with a top prize of $500,000.

=== Roast ===
The duo was roasted on January 11, 2008, in Atlantic City, New Jersey, at the House of Blues, with a portion of the proceeds to benefit the V Foundation. Guests included Jeffrey Ross, Frank Caliendo (pre-recorded video only), Mike Ditka, Chad Johnson, Clinton Portis, Ed Reed, Charlie Weis, Eddie Griffin, Joe Klecko, Trey Wingo, Mark Schlereth, Dana Jacobson, and Wink Martindale. Musical group Lifehouse performed live. The Roast made national news when it was reported that an apparently intoxicated Jacobson cursed the University of Notre Dame and Jesus Christ. ESPN released a statement apologizing for any offense given to the Notre Dame football program. Jacobson was suspended from ESPN for one week. Upon returning from her suspension, she apologized on air for her behavior and comments. Largely as a result of the incident, no video or transcript of the roast was ever released.

=== The Bruno-Golic Morning Show ===
Prior to Greenberg's arrival, the show was co-hosted by Golic and Tony Bruno. This pairing, which broadcast from 1998 to 1999, was entitled The Bruno-Golic Morning Show.

== TV simulcasting ==
The former logo of Mike and Mike in the Morning until Feb. 5, 2016.

In 2004, the show began simulcasting its entire four hours on ESPNews. Ratings for the duo were extraordinarily high, especially for being on the "minor league" of the ESPN networks only offered in a few markets on anything other than digital cable or satellite packages. To capitalize on the large viewership potential the simulcast was moved to the more established ESPN2 in 2006. This change pushed the morning show Cold Pizza (now titled ESPN First Take) back till 10 a.m. In 2007, the show began to be broadcast in HD, which required the move to the ESPN digital center. When ESPN2 covers live sporting events during Mike and Mike (The Australian Open, World Baseball Classic, etc.) the show airs live on ESPNews. After the event's coverage is over, the simulcast is moved back to ESPN2, if possible.

In May 2015, ESPN announced that Mike & Mike would move to New York and be based in the second floor studios of Times Square Studios facility, which also serves as the home studio for ESPN2's Olbermann and on the first floor, ABC's Good Morning America. The move was intended to allow increased synergies between Mike & Mike and Good Morning America, such as Greenberg and Golic appearing on GMA to discuss sports topics, GMA personalities appearing on Mike & Mike, and easier access to guests. However, in late-June 2015, ESPN announced that it had called off the move and that the program would remain in Bristol, "after carefully considering and working through all aspects of a potential move".

In February 2016, Mike & Mike moved into a new studio on the ESPN campus. (The change was made while the hosts did a week of shows in San Francisco for Super Bowl 50.) The new set features an informal interview area with lounge chairs, and a telestrator screen. The collection of bobbleheads that once graced the anchor desk was later displayed in cases behind the set.

If ESPN was broadcasting a live sporting event during the show's timeslot, SportsCenter would air on ESPN2, and the show's simulcast would therefore then air on ESPNews. If both ESPN and ESPN2 were showing live sporting events, Sportscenter would air on ESPNews and the show would air on either ESPNU or ESPN Classic.

== Off Mikes ==
In 2005, ESPN and Animax Entertainment began producing two- to three-minute cartoons of Greenberg and Golic, called Off Mikes. The cartoons are built around conversations and arguments of the two from the show. Off Mikes can be found on ESPN.com. The cartoons have won an Emmy award.

== Sheet of Integrity ==
"Sheet of Integrity" is a phrase coined by Mike Greenberg describing a single bracket entry created for wagering on the NCAA basketball tournament. Greenberg held the belief that if a person wishes to enter multiple pools, they should do so using the same picks for each entry. Conversely, Golic had no problem with choosing different winners for each entry he submits, stating "I want to win the pool and win the caaash!" The two had a good-natured debate on this difference of opinion each year from 2000 to 2014.

In 2007, Lowe's sponsored the Brackets of Integrity Sweepstakes, an online tournament pool that allowed listeners of Mike and Mike in the Morning to play against Greenberg and Golic using bracket sheets of their own. Amusingly, the rules allowed each participant to create up to five different "Sheets of Integrity." The hosts' differences were summed up in 2005 in two separate parodies of Billy Joel's song "Honesty" (renamed "Integrity"), as sung by each host in support of their wagering philosophies.

In 2009, Werner's (a ladder company which supplies the official ladders that the NCAA champion team climbs to cut down the nets after the tournament) sponsored the online sweepstakes. The sponsorship was continued in 2010.

In 2014, the contest was discontinued, with Golic having won the last four contests.

== Contests ==
=== The Battle for the Butter ===
In one contest they called "Name the Game," they chose a random, obscure college football game and asked the listeners to phone in or email their suggestions. The contest was a spoof of named games between more high-profile football teams (such as the "Collision at the Coliseum"). The football game chosen was the September 13, 2008 game between the University of Maine and Stony Brook University of New York. Because Maine is famous for its lobster, which is traditionally steamed and eaten with melted butter on the side, The Battle for the Butter was the contest winner, and the name was nationally popularized by the duo. Maine won, 28–13.
