= Mike Golic =

American football player and television host (born 1962)

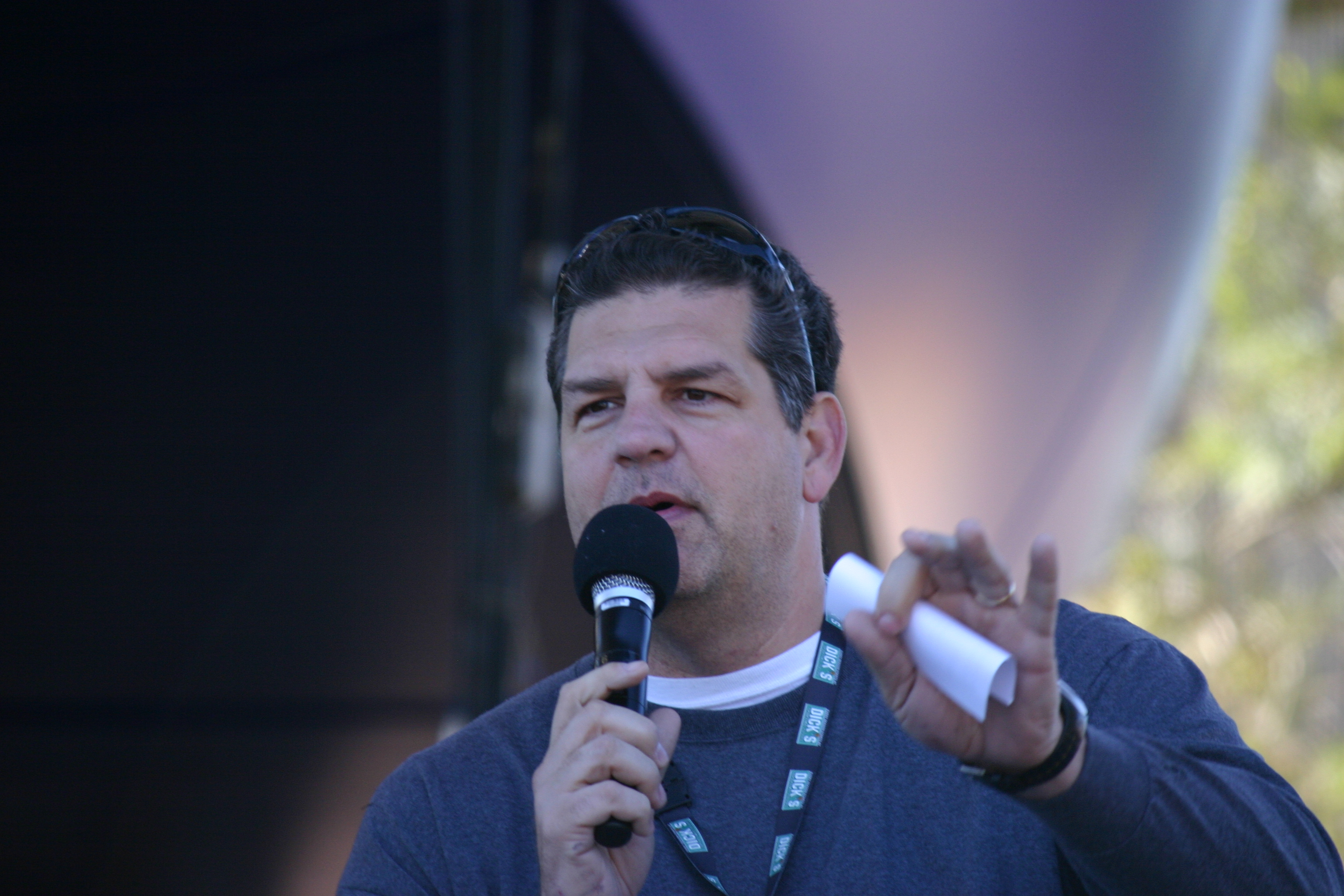
- Golic in 2010

No. 68, 90, 96
- Positions: Defensive tackle, defensive end

Personal information
- Born: December 12, 1962 (age 63); Willowick, Ohio, U.S.
- Listed height: 6 ft 5 in (1.96 m)
- Listed weight: 274 lb (124 kg)

Career information
- High school: St. Joseph (Cleveland, Ohio)
- College: Notre Dame
- NFL draft: 1985: 10th round, 255th overall pick

Career history
- Houston Oilers (1985–1987); Philadelphia Eagles (1987–1992); Miami Dolphins (1993)

Career NFL statistics
- Sacks: 11.5
- Interceptions: 3
- Fumble recoveries: 3
- Stats at Pro Football Reference

Michael Louis Golic Sr. (/ˈɡoʊlɪk/; born December 12, 1962) is an American television host and former professional football player. He played as defensive lineman in the National Football League (NFL). Golic is well known for his 25-year association with ESPN, most notably co-hosting ESPN Radio's Mike & Mike from 2000 to 2017, and returning in 2026 to host a new show with his son, Mike Golic Jr.

Golic joined ESPN in 1995 as a reporter/analyst for Sunday NFL Countdown. He was an original analyst for NFL 2Night (now known as NFL Live), the five-night-per-week news and information program on ESPN2. Golic also served as analyst for Arena Football League on ESPN. In 1997, Golic began serving as college football analyst for ESPN and ABC Sports, a role he continued until 2004 and resumed in 2020. He also hosted Golic and Wingo from 2017 until 2020.

After leaving ESPN, in 2021 Golic joined Learfield as co-host and analyst of College Football Saturday Night, a new personality-driven streaming radio broadcast of college football games throughout the season. He currently serves as an analyst for Pro Football Talk, and as the analyst for Westwood One's broadcast of Thursday Night Football. He later joined DraftKings to host a show with his son, which later moved to FanDuel Sports Network until its winddown in 2026. The Golics subsequently reached an agreement to return to ESPN Radio beginning in August 2026.

Golic was also the host of the long-running syndicated sports highlights, bloopers, and gag show called The Lighter Side of Sports.

== Early life and playing career ==
Golic was born and raised in Willowick, Ohio, and attended St. Joseph High School in Cleveland, Ohio. Golic graduated from the University of Notre Dame in 1985 as a finance and management major. He served as captain of the football team during his senior season and also wrestled for the Fighting Irish.

Golic was selected by the Houston Oilers in the 10th round with the 255th overall pick of the 1985 NFL draft. He was an eight-year NFL veteran, playing defensive tackle for the Oilers, Philadelphia Eagles and Miami Dolphins.

He played in 115 games (starting 49 games) and 5 playoff games during his 8 seasons in the NFL. He recorded 11.5 sacks and three interceptions in his career. Golic admitted to taking corticosteroids briefly while recovering from an injury.

== Life after retirement ==
=== Broadcasting career ===
During his five years in Philadelphia, he decided to begin his television career with a weekly segment on the Randall Cunningham Show. He received a Mid-Atlantic Region Emmy Award for his feature Golic's Got It. Mike Golic began his fulltime broadcasting career in earnest when he moved to Phoenix, AZ, in 1995 to become the lead talkshow host at KGME radio. Paired with co-host Bruce Jacobs, the Golic-Jacobs morning show on KGME became the model for ESPN's Mike & Mike five years later. Golic served as the analyst for Jacksonville Jaguars pre-season games from 1995 to 1998.

From January 2, 2000, to November 17, 2017, he hosted Mike & Mike with Mike Greenberg on ESPN Radio and ESPN2. November 27, 2017, he began a show with Trey Wingo named Golic and Wingo, which also featured Mike Jr. Prior to "Mike and Mike", Golic was co-host of ESPN Radio's first-morning show, The Bruno-Golic Morning Show, with talk radio veteran Tony Bruno. The program started in 1998 and ended in 1999 with Bruno's resignation from ESPN Radio. Golic worked with a series of co-hosts for the remainder of 1999. On July 9, 2020, ESPN announced that they would be canceling Golic and Wingo. Their final program together aired on July 31, 2020. On July 18, 2020, Adam Schefter reported that Golic would return to his former role as a college football analyst for ESPN during the 2020 season.

Golic later partnered with DraftKings, hosting the streaming show GoJo and Golic with Golic Jr. from 2022 to 2025. In 2025, it was announced that they would move to FanDuel Sports Network to host Golic/Golic (a move that also reunited the Golics with former ESPN producer Norby Williamson, who had overseen their previous ESPN Radio shows). The show was cancelled in March 2026 amid the financial issues at the network; Golic and Golic Jr. would subsequently return to ESPN Radio, hosting the new mid-morning show The Golics beginning August 3.

=== Other appearances ===
On April 27, 2008, it was announced Golic would appear alongside football's greatest players in the PS3 and Xbox 360 game, All-Pro Football 2K8.

Golic made an appearance on ESPN's mini-series Tilt. He can be seen during the final episode eating a donut at the buffet table. Mike also appeared with Mike Greenberg on the TV series Guiding Light in 2008.

In 2015, Golic was inducted into the National Wrestling Hall of Fame in the Outstanding American category, designated for those who have used wrestling as a stepping stone to success in other fields.

== Personal life ==
Golic's older brother, Bob Golic, also played at University of Notre Dame. He earned multiple NFL All-Pro nose tackle honors and is currently a talk radio host Monday through Saturday on WNIR-FM in Akron, Ohio and co-hosts the Cleveland Browns television pre-game and post-game shows on Sundays on CBS affiliate WOIO-TV. Their father, Bob, also played football.

Mike and Bob appeared with their father and their brother Greg on the May 28, 2009, edition of Mike and Mike in the Morning broadcast from Progressive Field in Cleveland. The three Golic brothers again appeared together on Mike and Mike on May 7, 2010, May 9, 2012, and May 31, 2017, when the show broadcast from Progressive Field. Golic has stated numerous times on Mike and Mike he is a Cleveland Guardians and a Cleveland Cavaliers fan.

Golic resides in South Bend, Indiana and Scottsdale, Arizona with his wife Christine. All three of Golic's children attended Notre Dame. His sons, Mike Jr. and Jake played football (Jake played the 2014–15 season with Cincinnati), while his daughter Sydney was a swimmer for the Irish. Mike Jr. signed with the Pittsburgh Steelers as an undrafted free agent following the 2013 NFL draft.

In 2010, Golic co-wrote the book Mike and Mike's Rules for Sports and Life with co-host Mike Greenberg.
