= Mike Greenberg =

American TV and radio (born 1967)

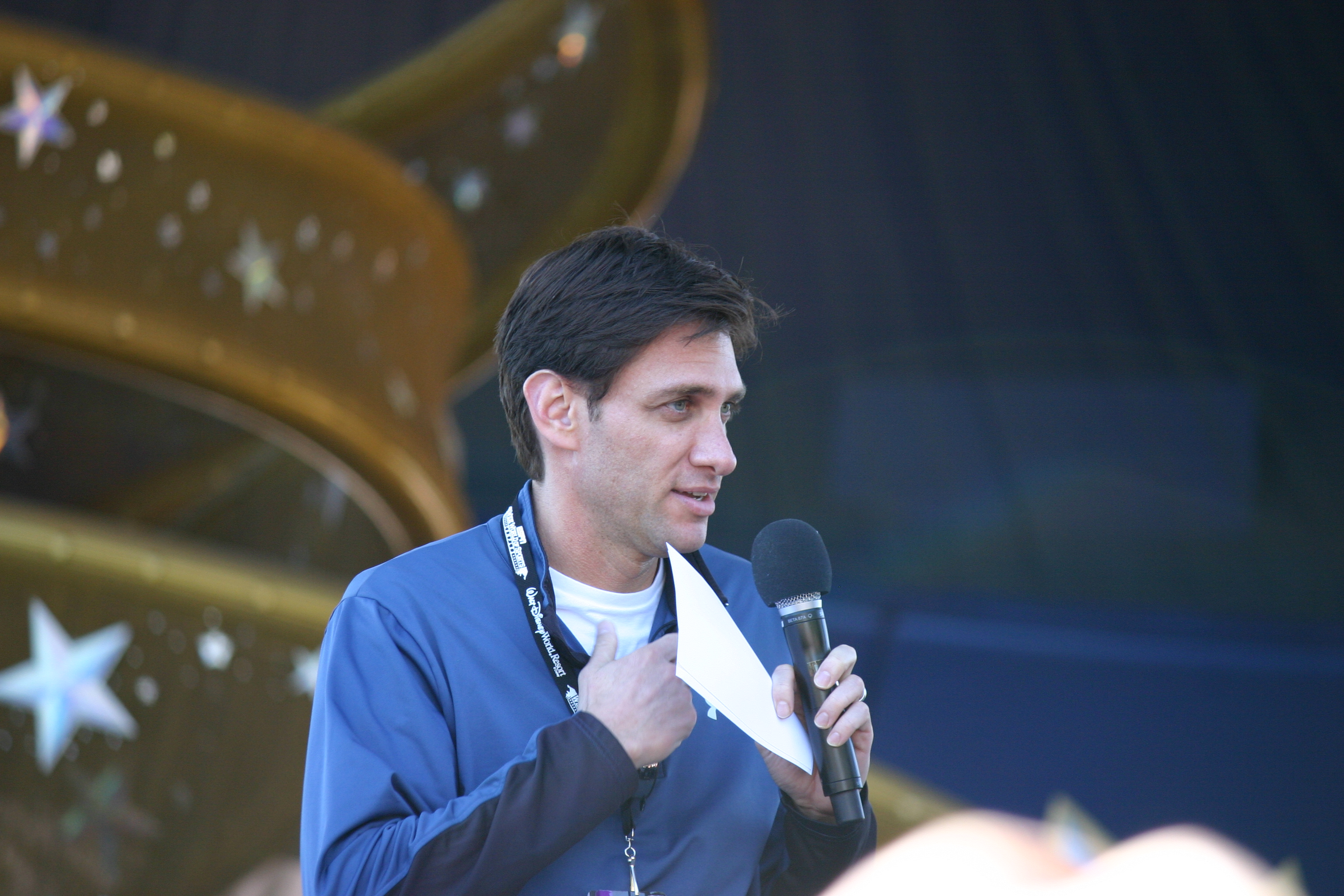
- Greenberg during ESPN The Weekend in 2010
- Born: Michael Darrow Greenberg; August 6, 1967 (age 59); New York City, U.S.
- Other name: Greeny
- Education: Medill School of Journalism at Northwestern University (B.S.)
- Years active: 1989–present
- Spouse: Stacey Greenberg (m. 1997)
- Children: 2
- Presenting career
- Show: Mike & Mike (2000–2017)
- Station: ESPN Radio
- Time slot: Monday–Friday; 6 am – 10 am ET
- Show: Get Up!
- Station: ESPN
- Time slot: Various
- Country: United States
- Previous shows: Mike and Mike

Michael Darrow Greenberg (born August 6, 1967) is an American television anchor, television show host, radio show host for ESPN and ABC, and novelist. At ESPN, he hosted the weekday evening, most often Monday, SportsCenter and previously ESPN Radio's Mike & Mike show with Mike Golic. At sister network ABC, he was the host of Duel, which aired from 2007 to 2008, and co-hosted Battle of the Network Stars with Joe Tessitore. He has anchored ESPN's morning show Get Up since 2018, and has also anchored NBA coverage on NBA Countdown, along with NFL coverage on Sunday NFL Countdown.

== Early life and career ==
Mike Greenberg was born to a Jewish family in New York, New York, and graduated from Stuyvesant High School in 1985. In 1989, Greenberg graduated from Northwestern University, where he joined the Theta Chi fraternity, and started work as a sports anchor and reporter at WMAQ-AM in Chicago. He left WMAQ in 1992 to work for WSCR-Radio as a reporter (covering events such as the World Series and the Super Bowl) and talk show host. From 1993 to 1995, he also wrote a weekly syndicated column for the California-based Copley News Service. In 1994, he added reporting for SportsChannel Chicago to his résumé. In 1995, he left SportsChannel Chicago to work at CLTV, becoming an anchor, reporter, and host of a live call-in show. He left Chicago in September 1996 for ESPN, where he became one of the first hosts of ESPNEWS when it began broadcasting in November of that year.

== ESPN career (1996–present) ==
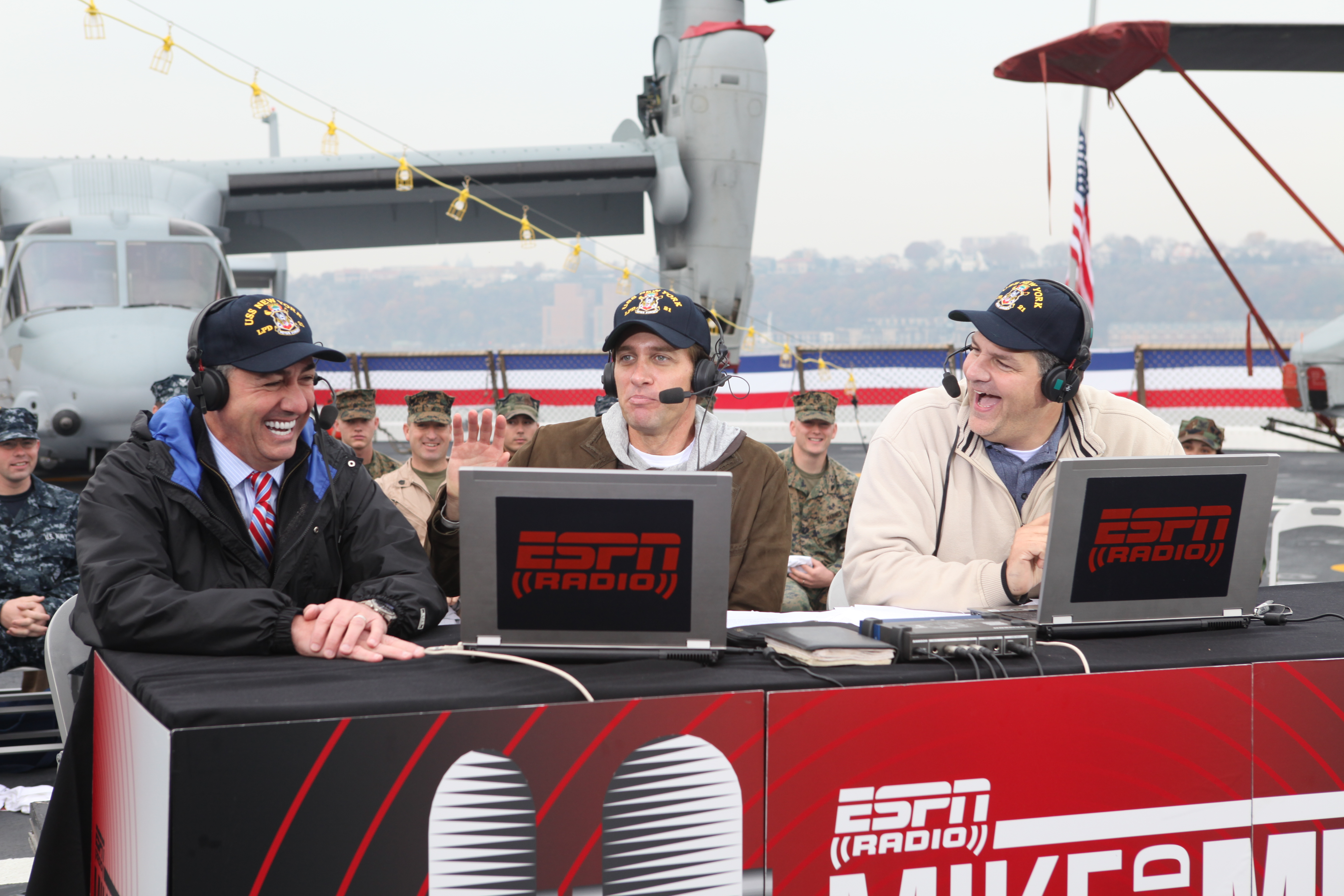
Greenberg on ESPN Radio in 2009

In 1999, with ESPN Radio airing in just four markets, Mike Greenberg was approached about returning to radio to be a part of a morning drive-time show with Mike Golic as co-host. Greenberg agreed, with the understanding that he would continue anchoring SportsCenter on a regular basis. On April 26, 2004, the show started a regular simulcast on ESPNEWS. Because of their continued success, the duo moved to ESPN2 in January 2005.

One of the most popular segments of the entire year on Mike & Mike was the annual "Sheet of Integrity" wager, a bracket wager based on the NCAA men's basketball tournament and the massive ESPN.com bracket contest. The bet originated after Golic told of how he would enter a massive number of sheets into different pools to win the money involved in the pool. Greenberg, believing picks required a sort of integrity, insisted that any such entrant be required to enter only one "Sheet of Integrity". Golic would select one of his (presumably) dozens of sheets against Greenberg, with the loser having to perform a humiliating stunt, usually on the air. The first year, Greenberg won and Golic had to have an eyebrow wax on the air. The next two years, Golic won, and Greenberg had to wear the University of Notre Dame Leprechaun mascot costume on the air, the second time on the Notre Dame campus. In the 2007 competition Greenberg, an admitted die-hard New York Jets fan, agreed to wear a New England Patriots jersey to a Jets game and to milk a cow live on-air. Greenberg received advice about milking a cow from ESPN baseball analyst Buster Olney, who grew up on a dairy farm.

Greenberg's final day as co-host of the Mike & Mike program was November 17, 2017. Greenberg and Golic were inducted into the National Association of Broadcasters’ Broadcasting Hall of Fame in 2016 and the National Radio Hall of Fame in 2018. On November 27, Trey Wingo, host of NFL Live and ESPN's SportsCenter, became Golic's new morning show co-host, and the duo hosted Mike & Mike's successor show, Golic and Wingo from 2017 to 2020. Greenberg joined a new ESPN morning show, Get Up!, which premiered April 2, 2018. He also returned to ESPN Radio with a new show, called Greeny.

== Other television ==
Greenberg hosted the ABC game show Duel. The first season of the show, a week-long six-episode special, premiered on December 17, 2007, and ended on December 23, 2007. The show was renewed, and premiered its second season (consisting of ten episodes) on April 4, 2008; the show's sixteenth and final episode aired on July 30.

On February 20, 2008, Greenberg appeared, along with his radio partner Mike Golic, on the soap opera Guiding Light as reported on ESPNradio.com.

On April 18, 2012, Greenberg co-hosted Live! with Kelly. Nearly or over 10 years later, he became the host of Sunday NFL Countdown

== Books ==
On March 7, 2006, Greenberg released his first book entitled Why My Wife Thinks I'm An Idiot: The Life and Times of a Sportscaster Dad, which reached 14th on the New York Times Bestseller list and was nominated in the 2006 Quill Awards for best sports book. In April 2010, Greenberg, along with co-host Mike Golic, released a book entitled Mike and Mike's Rules for Sports and Life. Along with the release, the two Mikes embarked on a 15-city book tour that included stops in New York City, Philadelphia, Pittsburgh, Chicago, Dallas, Boston, and Tampa. Greenberg released a novel entitled All You Could Ask For in 2013. He released the novel My Father's Wives in January 2015. On April 4, 2023, Mike Greenberg partnered with Get Up! producer Paul "Hembo" Hembekides to release "Got Your Number" published by Hyperion Avenue.

== Controversy ==
In 2010, Greenberg was embroiled in controversy when returning from a commercial break on his show Mike and Mike in the Morning. He appeared to refer to Martin Luther King Day as "Martin Luther Coon Day". He immediately "corrected" himself, and continued with the show as if nothing happened. He later apologized through an ESPN statement for saying what appeared to be a racial slur.
