= List of BS Report episodes =

The B.S. Report is an ESPN podcast hosted by Bill Simmons that features interviews with athletes, sports commentators, pop-culture experts, and friends of Simmons. It has no fixed publication schedule, though generally, 2–3 episodes are released each week.

== Episodes ==
The B.S. Report episode archive, 2012

=== 2007 ===
- May
  - Marc Stein (5/8)
  - Adam Carolla (5/15)
  - Paul Shirley (5/21)
  - Alton from The Challenge (5/29)
- June
  - Marv Albert (6/5)
  - David Stern (6/14)
  - Ric Bucher (6/21)
- July
  - Jimmy Kimmel (7/12)
  - Jerry Remy, Michael Wilbon (7/19)
  - Matthew Berry (7/26)
  - Tony Stewart (7/31)
- August
  - Aaron Schatz (8/17)
  - Steve Kerr, Jack O'Connell (8/23)
  - Sugar Ray Leonard, Cousin Sal, Jack O'Connell (8/31)
- September
  - Adam Carolla (9/4)
  - Cousin Sal, Jack O'Connell (9/12)
  - Cousin Sal (9/18)
  - Erin Andrews, Jack O'Connell (9/20)
  - Cousin Sal, Jack O'Connell (9/26)
- October
  - Cousin Sal, Jack O'Connell (10/2)
  - Seth Meyers, Jack O'Connell (10/8)
  - Cousin Sal, Jack O'Connell (10/10)
  - Jack O'Connell, Cousin Sal (10/18)
  - Jack O'Connell, Cousin Sal (10/23)
  - Charles Barkley (10/24)
- November
  - Cousin Sal, Jack O'Connell (11/1)
  - Marc Stein, Ric Bucher (11/14)
  - Gus Johnson, Jack O'Connell (11/19)
  - Bill Walton (11/27)
  - Cousin Sal, Jack O'Connell (11/28)
- December
  - Dave Dameshek, Cousin Sal (12/5)
  - Cousin Sal, Jack O'Connell (12/12)
  - Joe House (12/17)
  - Cousin Sal, Jack O'Connell (12/18)
  - Jimmy Kimmel, Cousin Sal (12/26)

=== 2008 ===
- January
  - Aaron Schatz, Cousin Sal, Joe House, Rob Stone, Dave Dameshek, Brad (1/2)
  - Cousin Sal, Brad, Aaron Schatz, Jeff Gallo, J-Bug (1/9)
  - Brad, Jack O'Connell (1/15)
  - Aaron Schatz, J-Bug (1/16)
  - Gus Ramsey, Jack O'Connell (1/30)
  - Aaron Schatz, Cousin Sal (1/31)
- February
- March
  - Jack O'Connell (3/3)
  - Jason Whitlock (3/4)
  - Ric Bucher (3/7)
  - Jack O'Connell (3/12)
  - Matthew Berry (3/13)
  - Adam Carolla (3/17)
  - Gus Johnson, Joe House (3/19)
  - Marc Stein (3/25)
  - Jack O'Connell (3/26)
- April
  - Sean Grande (4/1)
  - Seth Meyers (4/9)
  - Jack O'Connell (4/10)
  - Joe House (4/17)
  - Rich Eisen, Michael Lombardi, Jack O'Connell (4/18)
  - Matthew Berry (4/23)
  - Chris Connelly (4/30)
- May
  - Jack O'Connell (5/1)
  - Joe Sheehan (5/8)
  - Jemele Hill (5/15)
  - Jack O'Connell (5/16)
  - Chuck Klosterman (5/21)
- June
  - Adam Carolla, Kevin Hench, Jack O'Connell (6/4)
  - J.A. Adande, Jimmy Kimmel (6/11)
  - Joe House, Mike O'Malley (6/12)
  - Peter Vecsey, Jack O'Connell (6/26)
- July
  - Rob Stone, Jack O'Connell (7/3)
  - Dave Dameshek (7/9)
  - James Blake (7/10)
  - Adam Carolla (7/22)
  - Jack O'Connell (7/23)
  - Danica Patrick (7/30)
- August
  - Chris Russo (8/22)
  - Jack O'Connell (8/24)
  - Matthew Berry (8/26)
  - Cousin Sal (8/27)
- September
  - Aaron Schatz (9/2)
  - Cousin Sal (9/3)
  - Cousin Sal (9/9)
  - Chris Connelly (9/10)
  - Cousin Sal (9/17)
  - Mike Lombardi (9/18)
  - Rich Eisen, Cousin Sal (9/23)
  - Aaron Schatz, Jack O'Connell (9/24)
  - Cousin Sal, Gus Ramsey (9/30)
- October
  - Seth Meyers, Cousin Sal (10/7)
  - Matthew Berry (10/8)
  - Mike Lombardi, Cousin Sal, Jack O'Connell (10/14)
  - Matthew Berry (10/21)
  - Mike Tollin, Cousin Sal (10/22)
  - Joe House (10/28)
  - Cousin Sal (10/29)
- November
  - Cousin Sal, Aaron Schatz (11/25)
- December
  - Cousin Sal, Gus Ramsey (12/2)
  - Mike Lombardi (12/3)
  - Jack O'Connell (12/4)
  - Cousin Sal (12/9)
  - David Stern, Jack O'Connell (12/10)
  - Marc Stein (12/11)
  - Mark Titus, Cousin Sal (12/16)
  - Cris Collinsworth, Jack O'Connell (12/17)
  - Dave Dameshek (12/18)
  - Steve Kerr (12/23)
  - Cousin Sal (12/23)
  - Cousin Sal, Aaron Schatz, Mike Lombardi (12/29)

=== 2009 ===
- January
  - Cousin Sal, Aaron Schatz, Mike Lombardi (1/5)
  - Jack O'Connell (1/6)
  - Ric Bucher, Marc Stein (1/7)
  - Cousin Sal, Aaron Schatz, Mike Lombardi (1/12)
  - Peter Berg (1/14)
  - Cousin Sal, Mike Lombardi (1/19)
  - Chuck Klosterman (1/20)
  - J.A. Adande (1/21)
  - Cousin Sal, Mike Lombardi, Aaron Schatz (1/27)
  - Dave Dameshek (1/28)
- February
  - Jon Hamm, Seth Meyers (2/4)
  - Jack O'Connell (2/9)
  - Joe House (2/10)
  - Mike Breen (2/11)
  - Joe House (2/16)
  - John Hollinger (2/17)
  - Chris Connelly (2/18)
  - Adam Carolla (2/20)
  - Jimmy Kimmel (2/24)
  - Joel McHale (2/25)
- March
  - Mike Lombardi (3/2)
  - Matthew Berry (3/3)
  - Ric Bucher (3/4)
  - Jack O'Connell (3/5)
  - Daryl Morey (3/9)
  - Mark Titus (3/11)
  - Chuck Klosterman (3/13)2 parts
  - Cousin Sal (3/16)
  - Mike Lombardi (3/17)
  - Joe House (3/18)
  - Jason Gay, Jack O'Connell (3/19)
  - J.A. Adande (3/23)
  - Bill Hader (3/25)
  - Michael Schur, Jack O'Connell (3/26)
  - John A Walsh (3/27)
  - Le Anne Schreiber (3/30)2 parts
- April
  - Matthew Berry (4/2)2 parts
  - Jack O'Connell (4/3)
  - Rick Reilly (4/7)
  - Rick Rosner (4/9)
  - David Jacoby (4/10)
  - Ric Bucher, Marc Stein (4/14)2 parts
  - Jack O'Connell (4/15)
  - Sean Grande (4/16)
  - Joe House (4/17)
  - Adam Carolla (4/20)
  - Chris Connelly (4/21)
  - Jack O'Connell (4/28)
  - Marc Stein, Kevin Wildes (4/29)
  - Dave Roberts (4/30)
- May
  - David Jacoby (5/1)
  - Jack O'Connell (5/4)
  - Sean Casey (5/5)
  - Matt Taibbi (5/6)
  - Daryl Morey (5/8)
  - Joe House, Jack O'Connell (5/11)
  - Jeff Van Gundy (5/12)
  - Kevin Garnett, Will Carroll (5/14)
  - Dave Dameshek (5/15)2 parts
  - Gus Ramsey, David Jacoby (5/18)
  - Jack O'Connell (5/20)
  - Kevin Wildes (5/25)
  - Mark Cuban (5/27)
- June
  - Jack O'Connell, David Jacoby (6/1)
  - Ric Bucher (6/2)
  - Jerry West (6/3)
  - Matthew Berry (6/5)
  - Rob Stone (6/8)
  - Jack O'Connell, Joe House (6/9)
  - Adam Perry Lang (6/10)
  - Erin Andrews, Jack O'Connell (6/11)
  - David Jacoby, Kevin Wildes (6/15)
  - Dan Le Batard (6/18)
  - Chad Ford (6/23)
  - Jack O'Connell, Joe House (6/24)
  - Chuck Klosterman (6/29) 2 parts
- July
  - Keith Law (7/2)
  - Jack O'Connell (7/3)
  - Jon Wertheim (7/6)
  - Colin Cowherd (7/8)
  - Jack O'Connell (7/13)
  - Chris Connelly (7/15)
  - Kevin Love (7/16)
  - Dan Klores (7/20)
  - Seth Meyers (7/23)
  - Jack O'Connell (7/24)
  - David Jacoby (7/27)
  - Ric Bucher, Marc Stein (7/29) 2 parts
- August
  - Jack O'Connell (8/3)
  - Jon Hamm (8/4)
  - Jeff Ross (8/6)
  - Mike Lombardi (8/7)
  - Gus Ramsey (8/10)
  - Neal Brennan (8/12)
  - Jack O'Connell (8/14)
  - Matthew Berry (8/18)
  - Cousin Sal (8/19)
  - Steve Nash (8/20)
  - Jack O'Connell (8/21)
  - Alexi Lalas (8/25)
  - Aaron Schatz, Mike Lombardi (8/26)
  - Kevin Wildes (8/28)
- September
  - Artie Lange (9/1)
  - Tony Kornheiser, James Blake (9/2)
  - Bob Ley (9/3)
  - Chad Ford, Jack O'Connell (9/7)
  - Cousin Sal, J-Bug (9/8)
  - Patton Oswalt (9/9)
  - Bill Hader (9/11)
  - Cousin Sal, J-Bug (9/15)
  - Casey Wasserman (9/16)
  - Jack O'Connell (9/18)
  - Chad Millman (9/18)
  - Cousin Sal (9/22)
  - Matt Stone (9/24) 2 parts
  - Joe House, Jack O'Connell (9/25)
  - Cousin Sal, Rob Stone (9/29)
  - Joe House, David Jacoby (9/30)
- October
  - Alan Sepinwall (10/1)
  - Cousin Sal (10/6)
  - Sean Casey, Jack O'Connell (10/7)
  - Jack O'Connell (10/12)
  - Cousin Sal, Gus Ramsey (10/13)
  - Mike Lombardi (10/15)
  - Matthew Berry (10/16) 2 parts
  - Jack O'Connell, Cousin Sal (10/20)
  - Chuck Klosterman (10/21) 2 parts
- November
  - Cousin Sal, Jack O'Connell (11/3)
  - Norman Chad, Jack O'Connell (11/6)
  - Mike Lombardi, Aaron Schatz (11/9)
  - Cousin Sal (11/10)
  - Tony Kornheiser, David Jacoby (11/12)
  - Cousin Sal (11/16)
  - Super Dave Osborne (11/17)
  - Landon Donovan (11/19)
  - Cousin Sal (11/24)
  - Jack O'Connell (11/25)
- December
  - Cousin Sal (12/1)
  - David Jacoby (12/7)
  - Cousin Sal, Dicky Barrett, Super Dave Osborne (12/8)
  - Cousin Sal (12/15)
  - Mike Lombardi, Jack O'Connell (12/16)
  - Kevin Wildes (12/17)
  - Chuck Klosterman (12/21) 2 parts
  - Cousin Sal (12/22)
  - Chris Connelly (12/24)
  - Cousin Sal (12/29)
  - Marc Stein, Ric Bucher (12/30) 2 parts

=== 2010 ===
- January
  - Cousin Sal, Mike Lombardi, Aaron Schatz, Chad Millman (1/4)
  - Joe House, Jack O'Connell (1/5)
  - Chad Millman (1/11)
  - Cousin Sal, Mike Lombardi (1/11)
  - Chad Ford (1/13)
  - Tim Goodman (1/14)
  - Aaron Schatz, Chad Millman (1/18)
  - Cousin Sal, Mike Lombardi (1/18)
  - Jason Reitman (1/21)
  - David Jacoby (1/26)
  - Mike Lombardi, Geoff (1/27)
  - J.A. Adande (1/29)
  - Rob Stone (1/29)
- February
  - Aaron Schatz, Chad Millman, Joe House (2/1)
  - Cousin Sal, Mike Lombardi (2/1)
  - Adam Carolla (2/3)
  - Cousin Sal, Mike Lombardi (2/8)
  - David Stern (2/10)
  - Daryl Morey (2/22)
  - Seth Meyers, Jack O'Connell (2/23)
  - Kevin Wildes (2/25)
  - David Jacoby (2/26)
- March
  - Dave Dameshek (3/1) 2 parts
  - Rick Reilly (3/4)
  - Chuck Klosterman (3/5) 2 parts
  - Chad Millman (3/15)
  - Ryen Russillo, Chad Ford, Jack O'Connell (3/15)
  - Cousin Sal (3/16)
  - Joe House (3/17)
  - Jonah Keri (3/22)
  - Alan Sepinwall (3/23)
  - Mark Titus, Chad Millman (3/24)
  - Omar Samhan, Cousin Sal, Joe House (3/25)
  - Matthew Berry (3/29)
  - Keith Law (3/30)
  - Jack O'Connell, Joe House (3/31)
- April
  - Jared Dudley (4/2)
  - Mike Lombardi, Chad Millman, Jack O'Connell (4/5)
  - David Duchovny (4/6)
  - Cousin Sal, David Jacoby (4/7)
  - Jim Nantz (4/13)
  - Tim Goodman (4/14)
  - John Buccigross, Dave Dameshek (4/15)
  - Kevin McHale, Joe House (4/16)
  - Mike Lombardi, Aaron Schatz (4/19)
  - Jonah Keri, Jack O'Connell (4/20)
  - David Jacoby (4/22)
  - Marc Stein (4/28)
  - Matthew Berry (4/29)
  - Michelle Beadle (4/30)
- May
  - Buster Olney (5/3)
  - Ric Bucher, Joe House (5/4) 2 parts
  - Jared Dudley, Jack O'Connell (5/10)
  - Kevin Wildes (5/12)
  - Sean Grande, Brian Windhorst (5/13)
  - Carlton Cuse (5/14)
  - JJ Redick, David Jacoby (5/17)
  - Jay Bilas, Joe House (5/18)
  - Seth Meyers (5/20)
  - Alan Sepinwall, Chuck Klosterman, Gus Ramsey (5/24)
  - Dana White (5/25)
- June
  - Michael Davies (6/1)
  - Joe House (6/2)
  - J.A. Adande (6/2)
  - Steve Nash, David Hirshey (6/3)
  - Adam Carolla (6/10)
  - Jack O'Connell (6/15)
  - Chris Connelly (6/17)
  - Chad Ford (6/25) 2 parts
- July
  - Brock Lesnar, David Jacoby (7/1)
  - Cris Collinsworth, Jack O'Connell (7/2)
  - Dan Le Batard (7/9)
  - Dave Dameshek, Kevin Hench (7/13) 2 parts
  - Jack O'Connell, Joe House (7/14)
  - Alan Sepinwall (7/26)
  - Mike Lombardi (7/26)
  - Buzz Bissinger (7/28)
  - David Jacoby (7/30)
- August
  - Chuck Klosterman (8/2) 2 parts
  - Gus Ramsey (8/9)
  - Steve Kerr (8/10)
  - Jack O'Connell (8/12)
  - Shawn Michaels (8/13)
  - Rich Eisen, Joe House (8/16)
  - John Hannah, Dicky Barrett (8/18)
  - David Jacoby (8/19)
  - Aaron Schatz, Jason Whitlock (8/24)
  - Matthew Berry (8/25)
  - Cousin Sal, Joe House (8/27) 2 parts
  - Al Michaels (8/30)
  - Mike Lombardi (8/31)
- September
  - Matthew Berry (9/2) 2 parts
  - Cousin Sal, Chad Millman (9/7)
  - Chuck Klosterman (9/8)
  - Cousin Sal, Jack O'Connell (9/14)
  - Michael Eisner (9/17)
  - Alan Sepinwall (9/20)
  - Cousin Sal (9/21)
  - Cousin Sal, Jack O'Connell (9/27)
  - Mike Lombardi, Chad Millman (9/28)
  - Kevin Hench (9/29)
  - David Jacoby, TJ Lavin (9/30)
- October
  - Cousin Sal (10/4)
  - Buster Olney (10/11)
  - Cousin Sal, Jack O'Connell (10/12)
  - Joe House, David Jacoby (10/15)
  - Cousin Sal, Alan Sepinwall, Jack O'Connell (10/18)
  - Joe House (10/19) 2 parts
  - Mark Jackson (10/20)
  - Cousin Sal, Jack O'Connell (10/26)
- November
  - Adam Carolla (11/1)
  - Cousin Sal, Joe House (11/2)
  - Cousin Sal, Joe House (11/8)
  - Bill Carter (11/10)
  - Buster Olney (11/11)
  - Dave Dameshek (11/11)
  - Gus Johnson, Cousin Sal (11/15)
  - Kevin Love, Joe House (11/17)
  - Mike Lombardi, Casey Wasserman (11/18)
  - Aaron Schatz, Geoff (11/22)
  - Cousin Sal (11/23)
  - Jack O'Connell, Marc Stein, Joe House (11/24) 2 Parts
  - Dan Le Batard (11/29)
  - Cousin Sal (11/30)
- December
  - Steve Kerr (12/1)
  - The Miz (12/2)
  - David Jacoby (12/6)
  - Cousin Sal (12/7)
  - Cousin Sal, Jack O'Connell (12/14)
  - Ric Bucher, Joe House (12/15) 2 Parts
  - Ted Leonsis (12/17)
  - Cousin Sal (12/20)
  - Mike Lombardi (12/21)
  - David Jacoby (12/22)
  - Cousin Sal (12/27)
  - J.A. Adande (12/29)

=== 2011 ===
- January
  - Cousin Sal, Aaron Schatz (1/3)
  - Mike Lombardi, Chad Millman (1/3)
  - Trent Dilfer (1/5)
  - David Duchovny, Joe House (1/7)
  - Cousin Sal, Aaron Schatz (1/10)
  - Mike Lombardi, Chad Millman (1/10)
  - LZ Granderson (1/11)
  - Adam Carolla (1/14) 2 parts
  - Cousin Sal, Aaron Schatz (1/17)
  - Mike Lombardi, Chad Millman, J-Bug (1/17)
  - Patton Oswalt (1/19)2 Parts
  - Cousin Sal, Mike Lombardi (1/24)
  - David Jacoby (1/25)
  - Kevin Love, Nick Collison (1/26)
  - Henry Abbott, Marc Stein, Joe House (1/28)
  - Cousin Sal (1/31)
  - Mike Lombardi, Aaron Schatz, Chad Millman (1/31)
- February
  - Joe House, Kevin Wildes, Trent Dilfer (2/3) 2 Parts
  - Joe House (2/4)
  - Cousin Sal, Mike Lombardi, Chad Millman (2/7)
  - Alan Sepinwall, David Jacoby (2/11)
  - David Stern (2/14)
  - Jimmy Kimmel (2/17)
  - Jason Sudeikis (2/21)
  - Joe House, Jack O'Connell (2/25)
  - William Goldman, Dan Silver (2/28)
- March
  - Chris Connelly (3/1)
  - Chuck Klosterman (3/2)
  - Chuck Klosterman (3/3)
  - Michael Smith (3/7)
  - Christopher Nowinski (3/8)
  - Jalen Rose (3/9)
  - Adam Carolla (3/10)
  - Jackie MacMullan (3/11)
  - Chad Ford (3/14)
  - Chad Millman, Mark Titus (3/15)
  - Cousin Sal, Joe House (3/16)
  - Steve Kerr (3/21)
  - Matthew Berry (3/24) 2 Parts
  - Jeff Ross (3/25)
  - Jack O'Connell, Chad Millman (3/28)
  - Sean Grande, Frank Isola (3/29)
- April
  - Chuck Klosterman (4/6)
  - Kevin Millar (4/11)
  - Norm Macdonald (4/12)
  - Wright Thompson, Greg Wyshynski (4/13)
  - Marc Stein, Ric Bucher, Chad Millman, Joe House, Henry Abbott, John Hollinger, J.A. Adande (4/14) 2 Parts
  - David Jacoby, Dan Silver (4/18)
  - Buster Olney, Jack O'Connell (4/20)
  - Jonah Keri (4/26)
  - Mike Lombardi, Adam Schefter (4/27)
  - Adam Carolla (4/28)
- May
  - Brian Windhorst (5/3)
  - Joe House (5/3)
  - Matthew Berry, Henry Abbott (5/5)
  - Jimmy Kimmel, Marc Stein (5/9)
  - Mike Lupica (5/10)
  - Willie Geist (5/11)
  - Sean Grande (5/12)
  - Rick Welts (5/16)
  - Chad Ford (5/17)
  - Chuck Klosterman (5/18)
  - Chuck Klosterman, Charles Barkley (5/19)
  - Brian Burke, Alan Sepinwall (5/20)
  - Ric Bucher (5/26)
  - Marc Stein, Ric Bucher, John Hollinger, Chad Millman, Joe House (5/31)
- June
  - Greg Wyshynski, Michael Rapaport (6/1)
  - Jim Miller (6/2)
  - Dan Le Batard (6/14)
  - Mike Fratello (6/15)
  - David Jacoby (6/16)
  - Dan Barry (6/17)
  - Jack O'Connell (6/17)
  - Chad Ford (6/21)
  - Chuck Klosterman (6/23) Simmons absent
  - David Kahn (6/24)
  - Henry Abbott, Joe House (6/24)
- July
  - Mike Lombardi (7/5)
  - Chris Connelly (7/6)
  - Seth Meyers, David Jacoby, Jack O'Connell (7/11)
  - Chris Ryan, Jason Whitlock (7/14)
  - Rob Stone (7/18)
  - Dave Dameshek, Jack O'Connell (7/19)
  - Keith Law (7/25)
  - CM Punk (7/27)
  - Mike Lombardi, Bill Barnwell, Joe House (7/28)
- August
  - Jonah Keri, Mike Lombardi (8/10)
  - Tyson Chandler (8/11)
  - David Stern (8/12)
  - Matthew Berry (8/30)
  - Mike Lombardi, Bill Barnwell (8/31)
- September
  - Cousin Sal (9/1)
  - Cousin Sal (9/6)
  - Mike Lombardi, Jack O'Connell (9/9)
  - Kevin Millar, Keith Law (9/12)
  - Cousin Sal, Alan Sepinwall (9/13)
  - Cousin Sal, Aaron Schatz (9/19)
  - Brian Kenny (9/20)
  - Cousin Sal (9/26)
  - Alex Gibney (9/27)
  - Scott Van Pelt (9/28)
  - Jack O'Connell (9/29)
- October
  - Cousin Sal (10/3)
  - Sugar Ray Leonard (10/4)
  - Cousin Sal, Bill Barnwell (10/10)
  - Buster Olney (10/11)
  - Al Michaels (10/14)
  - Cousin Sal, Aaron Schatz (10/17)
  - Mike Lombardi (10/18)
  - Blake Griffin (10/19)
  - Nathan Hubbard (10/20)
  - Billy Hunter (10/24)
  - Cousin Sal, Mike Tollin (10/25)
  - Jane Leavy (10/26)
  - John Walsh (10/27)
  - Cousin Sal (10/31)
- November
  - Chris Herren (11/2)
  - Adam Carolla (11/3)
  - Cousin Sal (11/7)
  - Chris Connelly, David Jacoby (11/7)
  - Cousin Sal (11/14)
  - Marc Stein, Ric Bucher (11/15) 2 Parts
  - Mike Lombardi (11/16)
  - Cousin Sal, David Jacoby (11/22)
  - Cousin Sal (11/28)
  - Greg Wyshynski (11/29)
  - Joe House (11/29)
- December
  - Cousin Sal (12/5)
  - Gus Ramsey (12/5)
  - Steve Kerr (12/7)
  - Mike Lombardi (12/8)
  - Jack O'Connell (12/8)
  - Michael Rapaport (12/9)
  - Cousin Sal (12/12)
  - Louis C.K. (12/15) 2 Parts
  - Joe House, Cousin Sal (12/19)
  - Andy Greenwald, Alan Sepinwall (12/20)
  - Joe House (12/21) 2 Parts
  - Cousin Sal (12/27)

=== 2012 ===
- January
  - Cousin Sal (1/2)
  - Mike Lombardi, Chad Millman (1/3)
  - Aaron Schatz, Bill Barnwell (1/3)
  - Kevin Wildes (1/5)
  - Cousin Sal, Bill Barnwell (1/9)
  - Mike Lombardi, Chad Millman, Aaron Schatz (1/9)
  - Flea (1/12) 2 Parts
  - Cousin Sal, Mike Lombardi (1/16)
  - Cousin Sal, Mike Lombardi (1/23)
  - Cousin Sal, David Jacoby (1/31)
- February
  - Joe House, David Jacoby, Adam Schefter, Mike Lombardi (2/2) 2 parts
  - Joe House, Kevin Wildes (2/3)
  - Jonathan Kraft (2/3)
  - Larry Bird (2/7)
  - Cousin Sal (2/8)
  - Mike Lombardi, J-Bug (2/9)
  - Marc Stein (2/10)
  - Bob Ryan (2/14)
  - Chuck Klosterman (2/17)
  - Mike Breen, Jack O'Connell (2/21)
  - David Jacoby (2/22)
  - Joe House, Kevin Love (2/23)
  - Ric Bucher, Dirk Nowitzki (2/23)
  - Robert Horry, Chris Mullin (2/24)
  - Steve Kerr (2/24)
  - Chris Paul, Dave Cowens (2/24)
- March
  - Barack Obama (3/1)
  - Daryl Morey (3/2)
  - Jeff Van Gundy (3/2)
  - Bill James (3/2)
  - Mark Cuban (3/5)
  - Eric Mangini (3/6)
  - Magic Johnson (3/9 & 3/12) 2 parts
  - Mike Lombardi, Gus Ramsey, Bill Barnwell, David Jacoby, Bill's Dad (3/19)
  - Jay Caspian Kang, Mark Lisanti, David Jacoby (3/20)
  - Matthew Berry (3/22)
  - Steve Kerr (3/26)
  - Jack O'Connell, Jonah Keri (3/27)
  - Jonathan Abrams, Rembert Browne (3/28)
  - Steve Nash (3/29)
  - Bill Hader (3/30)
- April
  - Nick Watney (4/5)
  - Gus Ramsey, Jack O'Connell, Cousin Sal (4/9)
  - Katie Baker, Greg Wyshynski, John Buccigross (4/11)
  - Jack O'Connell, Joe House (4/16)
  - Mike Lombardi (4/23)
  - Joe House (4/24) 2 parts
- May
  - Jack O'Connell, Jonah Keri (5/4)
  - Ric Bucher, Rembert Browne (5/7)
  - Joe House, Phil Pritchard (5/9)
  - Jack O'Connell, Mark Titus (5/10)
  - Steve Kerr (5/11)
  - Mike Lombardi, Connor Schell (5/17)
  - Joe House, Bill Barnwell, Joe Jacoby (5/24)
  - Sean Grande, Jack O'Connell (5/25)
  - Dustin Penner (5/29)
  - Chad Ford (5/29)
- June
  - Joe House, J-Bug (6/4)
  - Greg Wyshynski, Cousin Sal (6/5)
  - Dan Le Batard, John Hollinger (6/6)
  - Cousin Sal, Jack O'Connell (6/11)
  - Lena Dunham (6/12)
  - Jack O'Connell, Rich Levine (6/25)
  - Louis C.K. (6/26)
  - Jay Bilas (6/27)
  - Joe House, Chad Ford (6/29)
- July
  - Joe House, David Jacoby (7/5)
  - Kevin Millar, Sean Casey (7/9)
  - George Brett, Matt Kemp
  - Rob Riggle, John A. Walsh (7/11)
  - Jack O'Connell (7/16)
  - Joe House (7/17)
  - Chuck Klosterman (7/18) 2 parts
- August
  - Kevin Wildes, David Jacoby (8/2) Guest host; No Simmons
  - Chuck Klosterman, Alex Pappademas (8/3) Guest host; No Simmons
  - Jalen Rose, David Jacoby (8/6) Guest host; No Simmons
  - Chris Ryan, Andy Greenwald, Rembert Browne (8/7) Guest host; No Simmons
  - Jay Caspian King, Haralabos Voulgaris (8/8) Guest host; No Simmons
  - Chuck Klosterman, Kirk Herbstreit (8/9) Guest host; No Simmons
  - Juliet Litman, David Jacoby (8/10) Guest host; No Simmons
  - Jack O'Connell (8/20)
  - Matthew Berry (8/22)
  - Joe House (8/23)
  - Bill Barnwell (8/24)
  - Jack O'Connell (8/28)
  - Cousin Sal (8/29 & 8/30) 2 parts
- September
  - Mike Lombardi (9/4)
  - Jack Black (9/5)
  - Mike Lombardi, Joe House (9/10)
  - Cousin Sal (9/11)
  - Jack O'Connell (9/12)
  - Cousin Sal (9/17)
  - Seth Meyers (9/19)
  - Jimmy Kimmel (9/21)
  - Cousin Sal, Bill's Dad (9/24)
  - Mike Lombardi, Aaron Schatz (9/25)
  - Kevin Wildes (9/27)
- October
  - Cousin Sal, Billy Corben (10/1)
  - Jack O'Connell (10/2)
  - Arnold Schwarzenegger (10/3)
  - Bill Barnwell, Joe House, Gus Ramsey (10/4)
  - Malcolm Gladwell (10/5)
  - Cousin Sal (10/8)
  - Jack O'Connell, Zach Lowe (10/11)
  - Cousin Sal (10/15)
  - Jack O'Connell, Joe House (10/15)
  - Mike Lombardi (10/16)
  - Jalen Rose (10/17)
  - Joe House, Cousin Sal, Jack O'Connell (10/22) 2 parts
  - Brian Scalabrine (10/23)
  - Joe House (10/24) 2 parts
  - Zach Lowe, Haralabos Voulgaris (10/29)
  - Cousin Sal, Wright Thompson (10/30)
  - Brian Austin Green (10/31)
- November
  - Cousin Sal, Joe House (11/5)
  - Adam Carolla (11/5)
  - Cousin Sal, Bill's Daughter (11/12)
  - Zach Lowe, Bill's Dad (11/13)
  - Steve Kerr (11/13)
  - Cousin Sal (11/19)
  - Cousin Sal (11/26)
  - Nate Silver (11/30)
- December
  - Mike Lombardi, Alan Sepinwall (12/3) 2 parts
  - Cousin Sal (12/4)
  - Aaron Schatz, Zach Lowe (12/5)
  - Cousin Sal (12/10)
  - Jonah Keri, Jack O'Connell (12/11)
  - Kevin Wildes (12/13)
  - Cousin Sal (12/17)
  - Mike Lombardi (12/18)
  - Zach Lowe, Haralabos Voulgaris (12/19)
  - Cousin Sal (12/24)
  - Aaron Schatz (Rerun from January 2008) (12/25)
  - Jack O'Connell (Rerun from April 2008) (12/26)
  - Chris Connelly (Rerun from 12/24/09) (12/27)
  - Adam Carolla (Rerun) (12/28)
  - Cousin Sal, Chad Millman (12/31)
  - Mike Lombardi, Joe House (12/31)

=== 2013 ===
- January
  - Aaron Schatz, Bill Barnwell (1/2)
  - Stephen Curry, David Lee (1/3)
  - Mike Lombardi, Cousin Sal, Joe House (1/7)
  - Jalen Rose, David Jacoby (1/8)
  - Aaron Schatz (1/9)
  - Cousin Sal, Chad Millman (1/14)
  - Mike Lombardi (1/14)
  - Steve Kerr (1/15)
  - Aaron Schatz, Bill Barnwell (1/16)
  - Adam Carolla, Mike Tyson (1/17) Guest host; no Simmons
  - Cousin Sal (1/21)
  - Terry Francona, Jack O'Connell (1/22)
