= TrueHoop =

Digital media company

TrueHoop is a digital media company co-founded by Henry Abbott, a digital sports media executive and journalist, and Judy Goodwin, an attorney and entrepreneur. After 10 years at Entertainment and Sports Programming Network (ESPN), Abbott relaunched TrueHoop with a subscription-based newsletter covering the National Basketball Association (NBA) in February 2019.

Prior to that, TrueHoop was a blog founded on May 15, 2005, and was one of several blogs honored with the 2005 "Best of the Web award" issued by Forbes magazine.

In February 2007, it was announced that TrueHoop was purchased by ESPN. ESPN later expanded TrueHoop to a blog network, consisting of many contributors and blogs. In addition to the blog, there was a "TruehoopTV" category of video and podcast content.

In February 2014, Abbott took over ESPN’s NBA coverage in digital and print.

Journalist Henry Abbott has written an investigative series covering connections between Jeffrey Epstein, Leon Black, and various NBA powerbrokers from Apollo Global, including Josh Harris and Marc Rowan, with whom Black co-founded the private equity firm in 1990. Black worked with Epstein for years despite knowing that in 2008, Epstein had been allowed to plead guilty to only two state-level prostitution offenses against children, even though sex with underage girls is legally rape.

== Previous regular contributors ==
- J.A. Adande
- Chad Ford
- John Hollinger
- Marc Stein
- David Thorpe
- Brian Windhorst
- Pablo Torre
- Rachel Nichols (journalist)
- Dorian (rapper)
- Black Tray
- BIG Wos
- Michael Kaskey-Blomain
- Mariano Bivens
- Amin Elhassan
- Zach Harper
- Tim MacMahon
- Tom Haberstroh
- Kevin Pelton
- Andrew Han
- Kaileigh Brandt
- Jade Hoye
