= NBA Countdown =

American television program

- Logo from 2016 to 2022. This version uses the 1969 NBA wordmark, and is used during the 2016–17 season.
- Also known as: NBA Shootaround (ABC: 2002–03, ESPN: 2002–12); NBA Hangtime (ABC: 2003–04); NBA Game Time (ABC: 2004–05); NBA Nation (ABC: 2005–06); NBA Sunday Countdown (ABC: 2006–08)
- Genre: Pre-game show
- Starring: Malika Andrews; Kendrick Perkins; Brian Windhorst; Jason Kidd; Kenny Smith; Shams Charania
- Country of origin: United States

Production
- Running time: 30-60 minutes

Original release
- Network: ABC; ESPN; ESPN DTC; ESPN Deportes (Spanish audio/broadcast)
- Release: October 25, 2002 – present

Related
- NBA on ABC; NBA on ESPN; Inside the NBA

NBA Countdown (branded for sponsorship purposes as NBA Countdown presented by Popeyes for ESPN editions and NBA Countdown delivered by Papa John's for ABC editions respectively), is an American pregame television program airing prior to National Basketball Association (NBA) telecasts on ABC and ESPN. The networks have aired NBA games since 2002. Typically, the program airs 30 or 60 minutes prior to the game. ESPN2 or another ESPN network may also be used as an overflow channel for the show.

== History ==
=== 2002–2003 ===
ABC and ESPN gained rights to air NBA games prior to the start of the 2002-03 season. At the time, ABC Sports operated as a separate entity from ESPN even though both were owned by Disney.

Initially, the NBA pregame show was known as NBA Shootaround. The ESPN version was originally hosted by Kevin Frazier, with analyst Tim Hardaway. The original program was broadcast out of one of ESPN's Bristol studios. Some of the features the first edition of NBA Shootaround contained were Walton's World, in which NBA analyst and legend Bill Walton would speak about matters related to the NBA, and Need to Know, in which host Frazier would go over the headlines of the night's upcoming NBA action. Midway through the inaugural season, widely criticized and panned analyst Tim Hardaway was replaced with recently retired NBA guard Greg Anthony. Frazier and Anthony were the tandem for the pregame show throughout the remainder of the season.

The ABC version was hosted by Mike Tirico, with analysts Bill Walton and Tom Tolbert. Unlike most network pregame shows, Shootaround did not take place in a studio, and instead traveled to a different site each week (much like ESPN's College Gameday). Starting with Game 1 of the 2003 Eastern Conference Finals, Walton was replaced in the pregame show by Sean Elliott. Tolbert was dropped from the pregame show starting with Game 1 of the NBA Finals. Tirico and Elliott were joined by a guest analyst for each game of the Finals.

This ABC version ended up not having much consistency, going through five names in five seasons, and several analysts in each season (see below). This was unlike NBC's NBA studio show, NBA Showtime, for the first ten seasons of its existence between 1990 and 2000.

=== 2003–2004 ===
Prior to the start of the 2003-04 season, major changes were made to the ESPN version of NBA Shootaround. The program was moved into its Times Square home, and Frazier and Anthony were joined by then-Detroit Shock head coach Bill Laimbeer and The Philadelphia Inquirer columnist, Stephen A. Smith. Nearly all of the features from the first season were discontinued, while several were added (including Fortune Tellers, in which the three analysts, Anthony, Laimbeer and Smith, would dress as psychics and predict the outcomes of several NBA teams). Laimbeer left early in ESPN's coverage of the 2004 NBA Playoffs due to his duties as coach of the Detroit Shock, and was replaced by Tim Legler. Frazier, Anthony, Smith and Legler were the studio team through ESPN's coverage of the 2004 Eastern Conference Finals.

ABC retooled much of its NBA coverage after bad ratings during its first season. This included its version of the pregame show, which was rebranded NBA Hangtime, and moved into the network's Times Square studios. The pregame show was given new music and graphics, to differentiate itself from its ESPN counterpart, and was still hosted by Mike Tirico. Tom Tolbert was brought back as an analyst, but ABC dropped Bill Walton from pregame show duties. He was replaced by George Karl. After criticism from the media on Karl's lack of opinion during the program, ABC replaced him on February 22, 2004 with former New Jersey Nets coach Byron Scott. NBA Hangtime lasted through the 2003–2004 season, and continued on Christmas Day 2004, prior to the much-hyped Los Angeles Lakers-Miami Heat game. This telecast was the only NBA Hangtime to involve analysts Steve Jones and Bill Walton.

=== 2004–2005 ===
In September 2004, Kevin Frazier left ESPN to become the weekend anchor on Entertainment Tonight. He was replaced for the 2004-05 season by veteran ESPN anchor John Saunders, who had previously done play-by-play for the network's NBA coverage. Saunders was joined by Smith, Anthony, and on a permanent basis, Legler. The new ESPN studio team only had four editions of NBA Shootaround before the most infamous moments in the history of the network's NBA coverage. After the Pacers–Pistons brawl, ESPN went back to its studio for reaction. A visibly angry and shaken Saunders referred to the fans in Detroit as "punks and sissies", and he, Anthony and Legler vehemently defended Ron Artest's actions. After being censured by ESPN and the media in general, the three quickly changed their opinions. NBA analyst David Dupree wrote in a USAToday.com chat:

I am good friends with Legler, Anthony and Saunders, as well as Stephen A., and I was appalled at their remarks. You can never justify violence with more violence. Why is it so difficult for professional athletes to understand that they do have to answer to a higher standard because everyone is watching them and they set the behavior tone. The comments of the studio people were as sickening to me as the fight itself. Why don't people realize that it takes a much braver man to walk away than to fight.

Later in the season, Smith and Anthony got into an extremely heated debate about the NBA's age-limit and the questions about race which arose from it. Aside from the serious moments, Shootaround did continue its more light-hearted fare, which included an ongoing storyline (and mockery of Ron Artest's similar situation) about Greg Anthony's "rap album". Still, the season did not end without another infamous moment from the pregame show, when prior to Game 2 of the 2005 Western Conference Finals between the Phoenix Suns and San Antonio Spurs, Stephen A. Smith criticized Spurs forward Glenn Robinson for not playing in the game. As viewers (and Smith) found out later that game, Robinson was not playing due to his mother's death.

Over at ABC, the pregame show was renamed NBA Game Time. Like Hangtime, it originated from the network's Times Square studios, and was once more hosted by Mike Tirico. Tirico was re-joined by Bill Walton in the studio, and Walton's old broadcast partner from NBC, Steve "Snapper" Jones. Tom Tolbert was dropped, while Byron Scott and George Karl both returned to the NBA coaching ranks. Game Time, unlike its predecessors, included guest analysts, such as Baron Davis, Jalen Rose, Rick Fox, and Bill Russell. During the 2005 Western Conference Finals, Steve Jones fell ill with appendicitis, and was later replaced for the NBA Finals by ESPN analyst Greg Anthony.

=== 2005–2006 ===
For the 2005-06 NBA season, ESPN continued using Saunders, Legler, Smith and Anthony for its pregame show. On several occasions that year, ABC analyst Scottie Pippen filled in for Tim Legler while he went on assignment. Stephen A. Smith was occasionally absent from the pregame show, likely due to the increased workload he had due to his new talk show, Quite Frankly with Stephen A. Smith.

The ABC pregame show underwent yet another transformation. It adopted the former name of the ESPN2 Tuesday night NBA studio show, and became known as NBA Nation. For most of the season, Mike Tirico hosted the program. He was joined by Scottie Pippen, as Steve Jones and Bill Walton both returned to the broadcast booth. In the first edition of NBA Nation, Pippen was only seen in the final segment of the show. The first three segments involved special-interest stories and a panel of celebrities and sportswriters discussing issues concerning the NBA. This panel of guests was the first of only two. Though it was originally planned for Tirico to be joined by an in-studio panel of guests each week, the plan was evidently scrapped after January 22. Following that, a panel of guests, all of which directly connected to the NBA or basketball in general, joined Tirico via satellite occasionally (with the exception of March 5, when both Mike Krzyzewski and Jerry Colangelo joined Tirico in-studio). Until January 29, the program also featured an NBA-related segment from ESPN's Pardon the Interruption.

On March 3, 2006, the New York Post reported that ABC would replace Tirico with ESPN's Dan Patrick starting on March 19. Tirico moved to the number two play-by-play team, behind Mike Breen, and Patrick hosted ABC's coverage every week, including the NBA Finals. This move ended the most consistent role The NBA on ABC had, which was of Mike Tirico has studio host. In the suddenly revamped edition of NBA Nation, Patrick was joined by Scottie Pippen, who continued his role as pregame analyst, as well as former ESPN commentator and NBA player Mark Jackson and Washington Post and Pardon the Interruption co-host Mike Wilbon on a weekly basis.

On May 12, 2006, the New York Post reported that Pippen had been let go from his duties as studio analyst for ABC, but would remain an analyst for ESPN. ABC went with the team of Dan Patrick, Mark Jackson and Michael Wilbon the rest of the way, representing a complete change from the beginning of the season.

==== ABC guests ====
- December 25, 2005
  - Chuck D, rapper
  - Josh Lucas, actor
  - Bob Ryan, Boston Globe sportswriter
- January 22, 2006
  - Method Man, rapper
  - Chad Johnson, NFL player
  - Peter Vecsey, New York Post sportswriter
- January 29, 2006
  - David Thompson, NBA legend
  - Jack Ramsay, ABC NBA analyst
  - J.A. Adande, Los Angeles Times sportswriter
- February 12, 2006
  - Michael Wilbon, Washington Post sportswriter
- March 5, 2006
  - Kobe Bryant, Team USA Guard
  - Mike Krzyzewski, USA Basketball Head Coach
  - Jerry Colangelo, Director, USA Basketball
- March 12, 2006
  - Byron Scott, New Orleans Hornets Head Coach
  - Jay Bilas, ESPN college basketball analyst

=== 2006–2007 ===
Despite reports to the contrary by The Big Lead that were picked up by various media publications (namely the New York Post), Greg Anthony, Tim Legler and Stephen A. Smith remained on ESPN's NBA Shootaround. The only change was the host, with Fred Hickman replacing John Saunders.

With ABC Sports' demise and rebranding as ESPN on ABC, ABC's NBA pregame show was given its fifth different name in as many years. Now known as NBA Sunday Countdown, the show would continue featuring Dan Patrick as host, with analysts Mark Jackson and Michael Wilbon. The show would not originate from Times Square, but instead originate from the site of that week's game (ala the original version of ABC's NBA Shootaround pregame show). After only two broadcasts, Mark Jackson moved to game coverage exclusively, and was replaced by Jon Barry.

On December 1, 2006, Patrick hosted ESPN's NBA Shootaround with analyst Michael Wilbon from Dallas, site of that night's ESPN televised Sacramento Kings–Dallas Mavericks game.

=== 2008–2019 ===
ESPN completely overhauled its NBA studio in 2008. Stuart Scott and Mark Jones rotated hosting the ESPN Shootaround pregame show. Originally Stephen A. Smith and Bill Walton were to be the analysts, but after Walton came down with back problems in February, Jalen Rose and Rick Carlisle rotated as analysts along with Smith. Greg Anthony and Tim Legler were demoted to analysts on NBA Fastbreak, SportsCenter, and ESPNEWS, and Fred Hickman moved to hosting ESPNEWS.

In addition to the change of host, ESPN's Shootaround moved from Times Square to the ESPN Bristol, Connecticut studios. On several occasions, ESPN used guest analysts from its other studio shows; Kiki Vandeweghe, Jamal Mashburn and Swin Cash have each made appearances. Stephen A. Smith's role has been greatly reduced. He no longer appeared on set with the main studio group, instead appearing via satellite in a segment called "The A List". Ric Bucher, Marc Stein and Jackie MacMullan contributed in a segment called the "NBA Nation", which involved analysis from Boston (MacMullan), Dallas (Stein), and San Francisco (Bucher). On the Wednesday following the cancellation of Smith's show, Stephen A. appeared on the set for Shootaround.

The ABC version was renamed NBA Countdown, and Patrick, who left ESPN, was replaced by Stuart Scott, joining Bill Walton, Michael Wilbon, and Barry as a contributor/fill-in. For the 2008–2009 season (beginning with the Christmas Day doubleheader), Barry replaced Walton full-time, Avery Johnson became the fourth member of the studio team, and Magic Johnson joined the show doing feature interviews and occasionally joining the studio crew as a panelist.

For the 2010–2011 season, Hannah Storm joined Scott as they alternated as host. For the 2011–2012 season, Wilbon was promoted to the host position, with analysis from Barry and Johnson, and Chris Broussard joined as the show as the NBA insider. The show also moved from the ESPN studios in Bristol, Connecticut, to their studios in Los Angeles.

For the 2012–2013 season, the ESPN version was renamed NBA Countdown to match ABC's counterpart. Jalen Rose and Bill Simmons replaced Barry and Broussard at ABC, respectively. Barry became a color commentator and Broussard a sideline reporter during games.

For the 2013–2014 season, Magic Johnson announced his departure. Doug Collins and Doris Burke will both be new additions to the program. Also, ESPN announced that Sage Steele would be replacing Michael Wilbon as host, ending Wilbon's 8-year run on Countdown.

Magic Johnson and Michael Wilbon were slated to return to the program in January 2017 to join Sage Steele for pregame coverage for the NBA Saturday Primetime on ABC series. With the 2017 playoffs looming, ESPN replaced Sage Steele with Michelle Beadle as the host of NBA Countdown on ABC and ESPN. Beadle joined NBA Countdown at the start of the 2016–2017 season, and has led ESPN's regular Wednesday and Friday episodes. Beadle has been named the full time host and will lead ABC and ESPN's NBA pre-game and halftime shows, including for the 2017 NBA Finals on ABC.

As of February 2018, production of NBA Countdown was moved from ESPN's studios in Los Angeles to ESPN's Bristol, CT studios in the set used for the network's NFL studio shows. In April, the show once again relocated to a new studio at Pier 17 in New York as Michelle Beadle was the host of ESPN's new morning show Get Up!, which debuted on April 2, 2018.

=== 2019–present ===
Over the 2019 off-season, reports began to emerge that ESPN was planning to retool the program. In August 2019, Richard Deitsch reported that Beadle was being dropped from the program, and that her assignment would be split between Rachel Nichols and Maria Taylor. Richard Jefferson and Jay Williams were brought in to replace Chauncey Billups, with the network retaining Jalen Rose and Paul Pierce. In October, ESPN replaced NBA Countdown as its pre-game show for ABC's Saturday Primetime broadcasts in favor of on-site editions of Nichols' studio show, The Jump.

Those plans crumbled after March 8, as the NBA suspended play due to the COVID-19 pandemic. Because of that, Nichols resorted to the NBA Bubble at the ESPN Wide World of Sports Complex at the Walt Disney World Resort in Orlando, FL, where the NBA restarted their season and held the Playoffs, where she eventually took Doris Burke's spot as sideline reporter for the Finals, meaning Taylor was elevated to host the NBA Finals on ABC, and Countdown being restored as ABC's pregame show.

For the 2020–21 season, Nichols was tapped serve as lead sideline reporter for NBA Saturday Primetime, and continue as sideline reporter of the NBA Finals, meaning Taylor was officially promoted to Nichols' spot as host, with Countdown being restored as pregame show. After he was part of an inappropriate Instagram video, ESPN quietly dropped Pierce on April 6, without replacement for the remainder of the season. Prior to the 2021 NBA Finals, Nichols was removed in favor of Malika Andrews after a video revealed of Nichols uttering racially insensitive comments towards black colleague Taylor. Soon after, Taylor departed to join NBC Sports, and Nichols was removed from all ESPN programming. Nichols has since left ESPN.

For the 2021–22 season, Lisa Salters was reinstated as the primary sideline reporter, replacing the departed Nichols. Following the Nichols-Taylor fallout, ESPN tapped Mike Greenberg to replace both Nichols and Taylor on NBA Countdown. ESPN also dropped Williams from Countdown, while retaining Rose, and bringing Michael Wilbon, Stephen A. Smith, and Magic Johnson back. SportsCenter anchor Michael Eaves was tapped to host on Wednesdays alongside Jefferson, Kendrick Perkins, and WNBA star Chiney Ogwumike. Andrews was tapped to fill-in as Countdown host whenever Eaves or Greenberg have other assignments. After only making two appearances during the season, Johnson did not return for the 2022-23 season due to issues with Johnson's schedule.

The 2023–24 season saw a couple big changes to the crew as Andrews was tapped as full-time host, replacing Greenberg. Longtime president of basketball operations and general manager of the Golden State Warriors Bob Myers was hired to replace Rose, who was part of ESPN's layoffs.

Ahead of the knockout stage of the inaugural NBA In-Season Tournament in 2023, it was announced that ESPN and TNT would collaborate on coverage involving both their commentary and their pregame and postgame coverage. As part of this, Countdown collaborated with the Inside the NBA cast – Ernie Johnson, Shaquille O'Neal, Kenny Smith, and Charles Barkley – with Johnson, Kenny Smith, Barkley and O'Neal appearing on Countdown while Andrews, Stephen A. Smith, Wilbon, and Myers would appear on TNT's pregame show, NBA Tip-Off. Additionally, it was also announced the Stephen A. Smith and Wilbon would also appear on Inside.

On November 18, 2024, ESPN announced that NBA Countdown would continue to air in the 2025–26 season onward alongside the TNT Sports-produced Inside the NBA (formerly part of the NBA on TNT), which ESPN and ABC acquired the broadcast rights to as part of an agreement with TNT Sports.

== Pregame show sites ==
Note: ABC's March 9, 2003 edition of NBA Shootaround took place at both Madison Square Garden in New York, with Mike Tirico and Sean Elliott, as well as Staples Center in Los Angeles with analysts Tom Tolbert and Bill Walton.

- San Antonio, TX
  - March 23, 2003, June 4, 2003, June 6. 2003, June 15, 2003, June 9, 2005, June 12, 2005, June 21, 2005, June 23, 2005, May 12, 2007, May 20, 2007, June 7, 2007, June 10, 2007
- Auburn Hills, MI
  - May 18, 2003, June 10, 2004, June 13, 2004, June 14, 2004, June 15, 2005, June 16, 2005, June 19, 2005, February 25, 2007, March 18, 2007, April 8, 2007
- Los Angeles, CA
  - December 25, 2002, March 9, 2003, April 27, 2003, May 11, 2003, May 15, 2003, June 6, 2004, June 8, 2004, December 25, 2004
- Miami, FL
  - June 13, 2006, June 15, 2006, June 18, 2006, December 8, 2006, January 21, 2007, February 11, 2007, December 25, 2014
- Dallas, TX
  - January 4, 2003, June 8, 2006, June 11, 2006, June 20, 2006, April 15, 2007
- Cleveland, OH
  - January 28, 2007, May 6, 2007, June 12, 2007, June 14, 2007
- Sacramento, CA
  - February 16, 2003, March 16, 2003, March 11, 2007, March 25, 2007
- East Rutherford, NJ
  - June 8, 2003, June 11, 2003, June 13, 2003
- Phoenix, AZ
  - March 4, 2007, April 1, 2007, April 22, 2007
- Minneapolis, MN
  - March 30, 2003, April 20, 2003
- Chicago, IL
  - April 21, 2007, May 13, 2007
- Washington, D.C.
  - February 23, 2003
- New York City, NY
  - March 9, 2003
- Philadelphia, PA
  - April 6, 2003
- Portland, OR
  - April 13, 2003
- Salt Lake City, UT
  - May 26, 2007
- Secaucus, NJ
  - May 23, 2003 (for 2003 NBA draft lottery)
- Las Vegas, NV
  - December 7, 2023 (for 2023 NBA In-Season Tournament Semifinals, collaborating with TNT's "Inside the NBA")

== Personalities ==
=== Current ===
- Malika Andrews (host, 2023–present; fill-in host, 2022–2023)
- Hannah Storm (host, 2010–2011; fill-in host, 2026–present)
- Kendrick Perkins (analyst, 2019–present, Wednesday analyst, 2022–present)
- Brian Windhorst (analyst, 2025–present)
- Kenny Smith (analyst, 2025–present)
- Jason Kidd (analyst, 2026–present)
- Shams Charania (insider, 2024–present)

=== Former ===
==== Past Analysts ====
- Bill Walton (analyst, 2002–2003, 2004–2005, 2007–2008)
- Tom Tolbert (analyst, 2002–2004)
- Sean Elliott (analyst, 2003)
- George Karl (analyst, 2003–2004)
- Byron Scott (analyst, 2004)
- Steve Jones (analyst, 2004–2005)
- Greg Anthony (analyst, 2005 NBA Finals)
- Scottie Pippen (analyst, 2005–2006)
- Mark Jackson (analyst, 2006–2007)
- Jon Barry (analyst, 2007–2012)
- Avery Johnson (analyst, 2008–2010, 2013–2015)
- Chris Broussard (NBA insider, 2012)
- Bill Simmons (analyst, 2012–2014)
- Doug Collins (analyst, 2013–2016)
- Chauncey Billups (analyst, 2015–2019)
- Paul Pierce (analyst, 2017–2021)
- Jay Williams (analyst, 2019–2021)
- Stan Van Gundy (fill-in analyst; 2019)
- Magic Johnson (part-time analyst, 2008–2013, 2016–2017, 2021–2022)
- Jalen Rose (analyst, 2012–2023)
- Adrian Wojnarowski (insider, 2017–2024)
- Bob Myers (analyst, 2023–2025)
- Michael Wilbon (host/analyst, 2005–2013, 2016–2017, 2021–2025)
- Stephen A. Smith (analyst, 2012–2025)
- Richard Jefferson (analyst, 2019–2025; Wednesday analyst, 2022–2025)
- Chiney Ogwumike (Wednesday analyst, 2022–2025)
- Michael Malone (analyst, 2025–2026)

==== Past Hosts ====
- Mike Tirico (host, 2002–2006)
- Dan Patrick (host, 2006–2007)
- Stuart Scott (host, 2008–2011)
- Doris Burke (host, 2013–2016)
- Sage Steele (host, 2013–2017)
- Michelle Beadle (host, 2016–2019)
- Maria Taylor (host, 2019–2021)
- Mike Greenberg (host, 2021–2023)
- Michael Eaves (Wednesday host, 2022)
