= NBA Sunday =

NBA Sunday may refer to:

- ESPN NBA Sunday, Sunday primetime games that air on the cable television network ESPN before 2026.
- ESPN NBA Sunday Showcase on ABC, Sunday afternoon games that air on broadcast television network ABC and produced by ESPN
- NBC Sunday Night Basketball, Sunday primetime games that air on the broadcast network NBC since 2026.
