= Michael Eaves =

American sportscaster

- Born: Michael Eaves
- Education: University of Kentucky; B.A., Journalism
- Title: SportsCenter Anchor
- Spouse: Crystal (m. 2009)
- Website: ESPN bio

Michael Eaves is an American sportscaster. He serves as an anchor for ESPN's SportsCenter and was a co-host of NBA Countdown for shows preceding NBA Wednesday. He began working at ESPN in 2015.

== Early life ==
Growing up in rural Hopkins County, Kentucky, Eaves played various sports but did not have access to sports broadcasts until his father purchased a satellite dish when he was in the sixth grade. This introduced him to teams such as the Los Angeles Lakers, New York Yankees, and the Atlanta Braves, something that Eaves credits for his interest in sports. Eaves grew up as a multi-sport athlete, playing baseball, basketball, football, and golf. He was the first black golfer to qualify for the Kentucky High School Athletic Association state golf tournament. He graduated from South Hopkins High School in 1990 and was named "Mr. South Hopkins," a top honor at the school. Eaves attended the University of Kentucky and graduated with a bachelor's degree in journalism in 1994.

== Career ==
Eaves began his professional career at CBS affiliate WKYT-TV in Lexington, Kentucky, working as a sports reporter and producer for seven years. He later worked at WPTY-TV in Memphis, Tennessee, working as a sideline reporter for the Memphis Grizzlies. Eaves made the move to the west coast in 2003 when he joined Fox Sports West. He hosted the Angels Live pregame show for the Los Angeles Angels and the Clippers Live show for the Los Angeles Clippers. Eaves also reported from the sideline at Los Angeles Dodgers and Los Angeles Lakers games while with the network. In addition, Eaves often appeared on KLAA AM 830 radio shows.

After many years working with local broadcasts, Eaves joined Al Jazeera America in 2013 to report on national sports news. He left the network in 2015 to join ESPN. While with the company, he has primarily served as an anchor for SportsCenter's night editions. He has also reported from the Masters Tournament and the Olympic Games. Following the death of Kobe Bryant in the 2020 Calabasas helicopter crash, Eaves anchored SportsCenter's breaking news coverage of the incident alongside Zubin Mehenti for five hours. The duo was commended for their coverage of the accident. Eaves personally knew Bryant from his days as a sideline interviewer for Laker games on Fox Sports West.

In May 2021, Eaves signed a four-year deal to remain with ESPN. After a shakeup of on-air NBA staff at ESPN during the 2021–22 NBA season, it was announced that Eaves would assume the role of co-host for NBA Countdown shows on Wednesdays, preceding the network's presentation of NBA Wednesday. He joined co-hosts Richard Jefferson, Stephen A. Smith, and Chiney Ogwumike.

Eaves has won four regional Los Angeles Emmy Awards for his work with Fox Sports West. The Los Angeles Press Club named him the region's top television anchor in 2013.
