= NBA Monday =

NBA Monday may refer to:

- ESPN NBA Monday, special Monday primetime games that occasionally air on the cable television network ESPN prior to 2025
- Peacock NBA Monday, regular Monday primetime games that air on streaming service Peacock since 2025

== See also ==
- NBA Center Court, regular Monday primetime games that aired and produced by cable network NBA TV prior to 2025
