= NBA Tonight =

NBA Tonight was an National Basketball Association studio program that aired on ESPN. The program used to air as part of ESPN's The Trifecta. Formerly known as NBA 2Night and NBA Fastbreak, the program, hosted by various ESPN personalities, provided highlights, analysis and updates from the night's NBA games. Segments include "3Ds", which looks at the night's top dunks, defense and dimes (assists).

== Personalities ==
- Jon Barry (analyst)
- Bruce Bowen (analyst)
- Brad Daugherty (analyst)
- Tim Legler (analyst)
- Jalen Rose (analyst)
- Marc Stein (analyst)
- Kevin Connors (host)
- Jonathan Coachman (host)
- Cassidy Hubbarth (host)
- Greg Anthony (analyst)
- B. J. Armstrong (analyst)
- Chris Broussard (reporter)
- Dee Brown (analyst)
- Ric Bucher (reporter)
- Swin Cash (analyst)
- Sean Elliott (analyst)
- Robert Flores (host)
- Kevin Frazier (host)
- Allan Houston (analyst)
- Mark Jackson (analyst)
- Nancy Lieberman (analyst)
- Jamal Mashburn (analyst)
- Paul Silas (analyst)
- Jason Jackson (host)
- Mark Morgan (host)
- Matt Winer (host)
- Fred Carter (analyst)

== See also ==
- NBA Shootaround
- NBA Friday Coast to Coast
- NBA Wednesday
