= NBA Coast to Coast =

NBA Coast to Coast (formerly known as NBA Fastbreak Tuesday and NBA Nation) was a weekly NBA-themed studio program which aired Tuesday nights on ESPN2.

== Format ==
The program is different from other studio programs, such as Baseball Tonight, in that it contains live cut-ins to NBA games in-progress as well as interviews with players after games end. However, the live cut-ins are not truly live, as there is usually a gap of a few minutes between the direct feed and what ESPN is showing.

== Personalities ==
Presently, the program is hosted by Kevin Connors, with analysts Tim Legler and Jalen Rose. The three are routinely joined by NBA insiders Ric Bucher and Marc Stein, and other NBA analysts for ESPN.

=== Other hosts and analysts ===
- John Saunders (substitute host)
- Kevin Frazier (host, 2002–2004)
- Matt Winer (host, 2006–2009)
- Bill Laimbeer (analyst, 2003–2004)
- Bill Walton (analyst)
- Antonio Davis (analyst)
