= NBA on ABC =

American television series

- Also known as: NBA Countdown; NBA Saturday Primetime; NBA Sunday Showcase
- Genre: American basketball game telecasts
- Directed by: Mike Schwab
- Presented by: Mike Breen; Richard Jefferson; Tim Legler; Lisa Salters; Steve Javie; Ryan Ruocco; Dave Pasch; Mike Monaco; Marc Kestecher; Doris Burke; Jay Bilas; P. J. Carlesimo; Stephanie White; Jason Kidd; Jeremy Lin; Katie George; Jorge Sedano; Angel Gray; Ernie Johnson; Malika Andrews; Shaquille O'Neal; Kenny Smith; Charles Barkley; Kendrick Perkins; Brian Windhorst; Shams Charania
- Theme music composer: Eric Hall (game coverage); Trevor Rabin (Pregame, halftime and postgame)
- Country of origin: United States
- Original language: English

Production
- Producer: Phil Dean
- Production locations: Various NBA arenas (game telecasts)
- Camera setup: Multi-camera
- Running time: 210 minutes or until game ends (inc. adverts)
- Production companies: ABC Sports (1965–1973 and 2002–2006); ESPN (2006–present); TNT Sports (2025–present) (Note: Pregame, halftime, and postgame only)

Original release
- Network: ABC (1965–1973 and 2002–present); ESPN Deportes (2004–present; Spanish audio/broadcast); Disney+ (2024–present; simulcasts); ESPN DTC (2025–present; simulcasts)
- Release: January 3, 1965 – May 10, 1973
- Release: December 25, 2002 – present

Related
- NBA Countdown; Inside the NBA; NBA on ESPN; WNBA on ABC; WNBA on ESPN

Television broadcasts of the National Basketball Association (NBA) games were first broadcast by the American Broadcasting Company (ABC) from January 3, 1965 to May 10, 1973. Broadcasts returned on December 25, 2002, this time utilizing the NBA on ABC branding. After the ABC Sports division was merged into ESPN by parent company Disney in 2006, the said branding was rarely used.

ABC's regular season schedule includes Christmas Day games; NBA Saturday Primetime games on selected weekends from December or January to March; and NBA Sunday Showcase games on selected afternoons from February to March. ABC then airs selected games during the first five weeks of the NBA playoffs and is the exclusive broadcaster of the NBA Finals.

== History ==
=== First ABC era (1965–1973) ===
ABC first signed a deal with the NBA to become the league's primary television partner in 1964; ABC's first game telecast aired on January 3, 1965 (a game between the Boston Celtics and Cincinnati Royals). ABC's initial alliance with the NBA first came about due to ABC Sports head Roone Arledge's search for live programming that could diminish the ratings of CBS Sports Spectacular, and ABC's anthology program, Wide World of Sports a boost with sponsors. ABC initially paid the NBA only $650,000 for the rights annually.

For much of the 1960s, ABC only televised Sunday afternoon games, including during the NBA Playoffs. This meant that ABC did not have to televise a potential NBA Finals deciding game if it were played on a weeknight. In 1969, ABC did televise Game 7 of the Los Angeles Lakers–Boston Celtics series in prime time on a weeknight. The following season, ABC aired the 1970 NBA Finals in its entirety, making it the first Finals series to have all games televised nationally.

Commentators for the original NBA on ABC included play-by-play announcers Keith Jackson and Chris Schenkel, and analysts Jack Twyman, Bob Cousy and Bill Russell. On April 8, 1967, a strike by the American Federation of Television and Radio Artists (AFTRA) forced ABC Sports producer Chuck Howard and director Chet Forte to call Game 4 of the Eastern Conference Finals between Boston Celtics and Philadelphia 76ers, as its regular announcing team were members of the union. Curt Gowdy also served on play-by-play for half of the 1967–68 season.

The first nationally televised Christmas Day NBA broadcast occurred in 1967 when ABC broadcast a game between the Los Angeles Lakers and San Diego Rockets from the then-San Diego Sports Arena in San Diego. Jerry Gross and Jack Twyman called that particular broadcast for the network. ABC would continue to televise Christmas games through 1972. The remainder of these broadcasts were based on Arizona Veterans Memorial Coliseum in Phoenix. Chris Schenkel did play-by-play for ABC during this period except 1970, when Keith Jackson held that responsibility. Jack Twyman remained as the color commentator for the broadcasts up until 1971 when the position was assumed by Bill Russell.

By 1969, ABC's NBA contract was worth only $3 million. To put things into proper perspective, in 1969, Major League Baseball's television contract with NBC was worth $16.5 million while the National Football League cost CBS about $22 million. ABC had made a bargain in purchasing the television rights to the NBA, considering the league's steady ratings. ABC's ratings for the NBA rose from a 6.0 in 1965 to an 8.2 in 1968.

ABC was by this time, coming increasingly under fire for what was perceived to be a less-than-spectacular presentation of the NBA. Sports Illustrated's Frank Deford in particular, singled ABC out for their coverage of the 1971 NBA Finals. Deford felt that ABC was making a mistake in trying to cover the NBA the same way that they covered a football game because they were two different games. On that end, Deford wrote that neither ABC's announcers nor cameras were able to isolate the important phases of the game. He added that replays were used only to second-guess officials rather than "capture the grace and precision of the performers". Meanwhile, Deford also criticized play-by-play man Chris Schenkel in regards to his failure to appreciate the nuances of the game and their halftime shows, which Deford saw as not innovative or imaginative.

The network proposed a contract extension with a modest rights bump in 1972, which was criticized by owners. Reportedly, a powerful bloc of owners in larger television markets were weary of television, though they understood they needed television to promote their brand. A major sticking point was attempting to force the prospective winning television network to air games on Saturdays during the fall and winter, directly in competition with far more popular college football telecasts on ABC. ABC balked at the request.

ABC lost the broadcast rights to the NBA to CBS after the 1972–73 season, with the network's initial tenure with the league ending with its last NBA Finals game on May 10, 1973. ABC filled the void left by losing the NBA by counterprogramming Wide World of Sports on Sundays against CBS' NBA coverage.

Thank you very much, it's a happy bunch that deserves it. They played extraordinary basketball. I emphasize again, that it's a team of unusual poise - a brilliantly disciplined, brilliantly coached basketball team. And they have won their second NBA title, beating the Los Angeles Lakers tonight 102 to 93. And they won it in '70, came back to win it in '73 beating Baltimore to get into the second round of the playoffs, beat Boston in seven games, and took the Lakers out in five. Willis Reed of the New York Knicks has been named the MVP of the championship series. He will receive a new automobile from Sport magazine. I like to pay a special respects to Terry O'Neil, who was our statistician during the season. And so that's the story of NBA basketball and for all of us at ABC Sports, you have a nice summer. Keith Jackson here at The Forum in Inglewood, California, this has been an ABC Sports presentation.

— Keith Jackson signing off at the end of ABC's coverage of Game 5 of the 1973 NBA Finals, ABC's final NBA telecast until December 25, 2002.

=== The dark years (1973–2002) ===
On December 15, 1973, ABC aired what is considered to be the first telecast of a regular season college basketball game by a major broadcast network (between UCLA and North Carolina State in St. Louis). ABC televised this game using its former NBA announcing crew of Keith Jackson and Bill Russell.

Bill Russell also provided color commentary for ABC's coverage of basketball at the Summer Olympics in 1972 and 1976. Russell worked alongside Frank Gifford, Bill Flemming (who (filled in for Gifford while he did wrestling in 1972), and Curt Gowdy.

And then in the 1977–78 NCAA Division I men's season, C.D. Chesley (who controlled the rights to the Atlantic Coast Conference (ACC) at the time) wanted NBC to televise select ACC games as part of its national package as it had done the previous few years. However, NBC wanted to feature intersectional games. This action greatly upset Chesley, who wound up selling the rights to the ACC Tournament final to ABC. ABC would televise the 1978 ACC Tournament final as part of Wide World of Sports. The game, called by Jim Lampley and Bill Russell, marked the first time Duke University's Blue Devils basketball team played on national television.

For ABC's final Summer Olympics to date, which were the 1984 games from Los Angeles, Keith Jackson provided the play–by–play alongside Digger Phelps (men) and Ann Meyers (women).

ABC wouldn't begin broadcasting college basketball on a more regular basis until January 18, 1987. In the early years of ABC's regular college basketball coverage, Keith Jackson and Dick Vitale were the primary announcing crew, while Gary Bender was the secondary play-by-play announcer behind Jackson. Meanwhile, Al Michaels did regional games during this period.

Also beginning in 1987 and continuing through 1989, ABC broadcast the McDonald's Open. Gary Bender and Dick Vitale provided the commentary for ABC's broadcasts. Supplemental coverage was provided by TBS.

==== ABC Radio's coverage (1984–1990) ====
From the 1984–85 through 1989–90 seasons, the ABC Radio Network was the official, national radio broadcaster of NBA games, succeeding the Mutual Broadcasting System. ABC Radio was in return, supplanted by Public Interest Affiliates' (or PIA's) NBA Radio Network.

Commentators included Fred Manfra on play-by-play and Oscar Robertson (from 1984 to 1985 through 1985–86), Dick Vitale (from 1986–87 through 1989–90) and Earl Monroe (from 1988–89 through 1989–90) on color commentary. Other announcers included Marv Albert (1989 All-Star Game) and Chick Hearn (1988 All-Star Game) on play-by-play and Rod Hundley (1987 and 1989 All-Star Games), Johnny Most (1988 All-Star Game), and Dave Barnett (1986 All-Star Game) on color commentary.

=== Current ABC/ESPN era (2002–present) ===
On January 22, 2002, the NBA signed a six-year deal with The Walt Disney Company and Turner Sports, which renewed an existing deal with TNT and allowed ABC and ESPN to acquire the rights to air the NBA's games. ABC and ESPN reportedly paid an average of about US$400 million a season. Technically, ESPN pays the NBA for its broadcast rights and "buys" time on ABC to air select games (this is noted in copyright tags during the end credits after the telecasts, saying "The preceding program has been paid for by ESPN, Inc."). As part of the agreement, ABC acquired the rights to the NBA Finals, at least 5 other NBA Playoffs games, 15 regular season games (mostly on Sunday afternoons), and NBA Inside Stuff on Saturday mornings.

For the 2006–07 NBA season, ABC's sports operations were fully integrated into ESPN (rebranding the sports division as ESPN on ABC). In June 2007, the NBA renewed its television agreement with ESPN and ABC.

The agreement was renewed in January 2014, extending it through the 2024–25 NBA season. ABC expanded its coverage beginning in the 2015–16 season when ESPN announced that ABC would add a series of eight of Saturday night games to its slate of broadcasts. As a result of this change, ABC no longer aired regular Sunday doubleheaders; doubleheaders ultimately returned in 2022. Expansion continued in 2021 when ABC began airing coverage of the NBA draft. On October 2, 2023, it was announced that five Wednesday night games originally scheduled to air on ESPN in January 2024 would be moved to ABC, as part of replacement programming due to the WGA and SAG-AFTRA strikes.

The NBA officially renewed its agreement again with ESPN and ABC on July 24, 2024, for another 11 years, taking its coverage through to the 2035–36 season. As part of a separate sublicensing agreement with Disney and Warner Bros. Discovery, ESPN and ABC gained the broadcasting rights to TNT Sports' Inside the NBA beginning in the 2025–26 season, the first season of their renewed agreement. TNT Sports will continue to produce the show for ESPN and ABC.

== Coverage ==
=== Overview ===
ABC's NBA regular season coverage has typically begun with Christmas Day games, followed by NBA Saturday Primetime and NBA Sunday Showcase on selected weekends starting in mid-January and February, respectively. Sunday Showcase typically begins with a single game on Super Bowl Sunday, except in 2021 (due to the COVID-19 pandemic-altered schedule) and 2027 (due to ABC and ESPN's broadcast of Super Bowl LXI), and continues throughout selected weekends in March. In 2021–22, 2022–23 and 2026–27, ABC's schedule instead began with a Saturday Primetime game on the second Saturday in December. In 2023–24 and 2024–25, ABC's NBA coverage began with the In-Season Tournament/NBA Cup, knockout rounds also during the second Saturday of December; such games have since been moved to Prime Video.

When ABC took over the broadcast television deal in 2002, it continued NBC's tradition of televising doubleheaders on Christmas for the most part. However in 2004 and 2006, ABC instead only aired one Christmas game. From 2004 to 2006, ABC also insisted on carrying a Christmas game between the Miami Heat and the Los Angeles Lakers, featuring their respective players Shaquille O'Neal and Kobe Bryant. In 2009, ABC's coverage began featuring a music video featuring Mariah Carey performing her hit 1994 single "All I Want for Christmas Is You." In 2010, Carey was also featured singing "Oh Santa!" From 2017 to 2021, ABC expanded to a tripleheader on Christmas Day. In 2022 all five Christmas Day games were simulcast across both ABC and ESPN, as an attempt to counterprogram the NFL's scheduling of Christmas Day Games across CBS, Fox, and NBC in 2022. With Christmas Day falling on a Monday in 2023, only two of the five games were ABC and ESPN simulcasts; the early and two evening games were only on ESPN while ABC aired Monday Night Football. In 2024, after the NFL scheduled Christmas Day games on a Wednesday for the first time, all five of the NBA's games were again simulcast across both ABC and ESPN.

The number of regular season games that ABC normally covers is significantly lower than what NBC broadcasts during its tenure with the league. In its first season of coverage, ABC aired 14 regular-season games, in comparison to NBC's yearly average of 33 games. That number increased to 18 games in the next two seasons (2003–04 and 2004–05), and 20 games in the 2005–06 season. For 2006–07, ABC decreased the number of game telecasts it aired during the season to 19. In a 2002 interview with Jim Rome, NBA commissioner David Stern commented about the number of league games broadcast on ABC:

Cable and satellite (programming is) increasingly available to everybody who wants it. On ABC, you're going to see us on as many or more Sundays during the regular season as NBC is now, but fewer triple-headers and double-headers, and frankly, we think that the triple-headers and double-headers, which we favored in the past, don't work. It's too hard to get people to sit through six and eight-and-a-half hours of NBA on (TV), and it's good to be on cable during the week because that's where our fans are looking for our games.

By contrast to Stern's assessment, media analysts and many fans found that the cable-heavy television deal made many games unavailable and, in addition, devalued the league. Starting with the second round of the playoffs, TNT's NBA coverage becomes exclusive, meaning that no locally produced league broadcasts can compete against the TNT telecasts (though commensurate with the move to sports rights to cable, few over-the-air local stations currently carried NBA coverage then but as of the 2020s new RSNs were launched through over-the-air rather than cable). Because of this, fans of teams in the playoffs who do not have a cable television subscription are unable to watch most playoff games. In addition, ABC's coverage is always exclusive, including during the regular season. If an ongoing game airs opposite to one televised by ABC, it cannot be televised in the local market, which has the side effect of causing some games to not be aired on television at all. Sports Business Daily quoted Houston Chronicle writer Jonathan Feigen regarding the structuring of the NBA's deal with ABC:

[the NBA] seemed to marginalize the product, treating their sport as small and their playoffs as no more important than one of 162 Atlanta Braves games.

On July 17, 2015, ESPN announced that ABC would move some Sunday afternoon games to be a series of eight Saturday night games to its slate of broadcasts in the 2015–16. The first NBA Saturday Primetime game aired on January 23, 2016. As a result of this change, ABC did not have regular Sunday doubleheaders until 2021 (due to the length of the NBA Sunday Showcase schedule being reduced). Since 2023, ABC aired its first non-Christmas NBA tripleheader on the final Saturday in January.

Also under the cable-heavy television deals, TNT was awarded the rights to the NBA All-Star Game (from 2003 to 2025) instead of ABC, in addition to renewing its deal for the events of All-Star weekend. The All-Star Game has not aired on over-the-air television since NBC covered the 2002 game, however NBC will return to air All-Star weekend beginning with the 2026 game.

As mentioned previously, ABC aired a series of Wednesday night games in January during the 2023–24 season due to the 2023 Hollywood labor disputes. As these were originally assigned to ESPN, they were non-exclusive games and regional sports networks were permitted to locally air the games alongside ABC.

Furthermore, ABC only airs selected games during the first three rounds of the playoffs. During the first and second rounds, ABC's schedule includes primetime playoff games, but they usually are only on Friday or Saturday nights. From 2019 to 2023, Friday night first-round playoff games on ABC were considered non-exclusive and may co-exist with broadcasts of regional sports networks of the teams involved (due to the game originally assigned to ESPN2 prior to 2019). From 2005 to 2007, ABC aired Game 4 of ESPN's respective Conference Finals (with all of those airing on Memorial Day). Under NBC's previous deal, Memorial Day playoff games were a yearly tradition on over-the-air television, however ABC aired a weekday conference final Game 4 in 2008 and 2022 and has not aired any more since.

ABC also rarely televises either of the NBA Conference Finals series outside of Game 1 (and from 2008 and 2009 and again since 2022 Game 3), with coverage instead primarily on ESPN, TNT (2003–2025) and NBC/Prime Video (2026–present). ESPN airs one Conference Final exclusively each year. From 2003 to 2025, ESPN aired the Eastern Conference Finals in 2003 and every even-numbered year from 2004 onward, and the Western Conference Finals in every odd-numbered year from 2005 onward, while TNT gets the other. Since 2026, ESPN would get one Conference Final per season until 2035, while NBC (even-numbered years) and Prime Video (odd numbered years) broadcast the other Conference Final. ABC typically only airs Conference Final matches – whichever one to which ESPN holds the rights in a given year – held on weekends. Due to the checkerboard schedule of the Conference Finals in which each conference plays every other day, ABC is typically only scheduled for a weekend Game 1 (if the series gets pushed up), and then a Game 3 Saturday primetime game in the middle weekend followed by a weekend sixth or seventh game (if necessary). However, Conference Finals series do not often reach a sixth or seventh game. In 2004, 2011, 2012, 2015, 2016, 2019, and 2020, ABC's playoff schedule was scaled back and the network did not air any Conference Finals games at all.

=== Studio shows ===
ESPN's pregame show, NBA Countdown, airs before each NBA game. It utilizes many of the same crew from ESPN's coverage. Another studio show, Inside the NBA, produced by TNT Sports, began airing on ABC in the 2025–26 season, as part of a sublicensing agreement between parent companies The Walt Disney Company and Warner Bros. Discovery (WBD). This followed a settlement between WBD and the NBA regarding TNT's loss of coverage rights to NBC and Amazon, which led to TNT filing a lawsuit against the league. Inside the NBA also airs during Christmas games, the NBA playoffs, and the NBA Finals, as well as all games.

=== Statistics ===
Games televised / television contracts per season (includes playoff games)on ABC
Season	2002–03	2003–04	2004–05	2005–06	2006–07	2007–08	2008–09	2009–10	2010–11	2011–12	2012–13	2013–14	2014–15	2015–16	2016–17	2017–18	2018–19	2019–20	2020–21	2021–22	2022–23	2023–24	2024–25	2025–26	2026–27	2027–28	2028–29
Games	27	29	34	36	33	35	33	31	30	29	31	29	30	32
Contracts	$2.4 billion/ 6 years						$7.4 billion/ 8 years								$26 billion/ 9 years									$28.6 billion/ 11 years

=== Criticisms ===
One common complaint about NBA coverage on ABC is the use of unconventional camera angles, including the Floorcam and Skycam angles, used by the network throughout its coverage. Other complaints are of camera angles that appear too far away, colors that seem faded and dull, and the quieting of crowd noise so that announcers can be heard clearly (by contrast to NBC, which allowed crowd noise to sometimes drown out their announcers).

Some complaints have concerned the promotion, or perceived lack thereof, of NBA telecasts. The 2003 NBA Finals received little fanfare on ABC or corporate partner ESPN; while subsequent Finals were promoted more on both networks, NBA-related advertisements on ABC were still down significantly from promotions on NBC. NBA promos took up 3 minutes and 55 seconds of airtime on ABC during the week of May 23, 2004 according to the Sports Business Daily, comparable to 2 minutes and 45 seconds for the Indianapolis 500. Promotions for the Indianapolis 500 outnumbered promotions for the NBA Finals fourteen-to-nine between the hours of 9:00 and 11:00;p.m. during that week.

ABC was also criticized for focusing its coverage on a select number of teams, particularly the decision to broadcast a game between the Los Angeles Lakers and Miami Heat on its Christmas Day schedule for three consecutive years. However, for 2007, ABC decided to break this tradition by instead having the Heat, for the fourth straight time, appear on Christmas Day facing the 2007 Eastern Conference Champions, the Cleveland Cavaliers. In 2008, the Boston Celtics replaced the Heat on the Christmas Day schedule, and faced the Los Angeles Lakers; and in 2009, the Cavaliers played the Lakers on Christmas Day. However, the Heat-Lakers Christmas Day special would make its return in the 2010–11 NBA season, as a result of LeBron James' recent move from the Cavaliers to the Heat. For the 2011–12 NBA season, the Lakers and Heat played again on Christmas Day, but against separate opponents. The Lakers played the Chicago Bulls, while the Heat played the Dallas Mavericks in a rematch of the 2011 NBA Finals; both the Bulls and Mavericks made their ABC Christmas Day debuts, which also acted as the league's opening day that season due to the 2011 NBA lockout delaying the start of the season. In the case of the latter, ABC aired the pre-game championship ring and banner ceremony for the Mavericks, which marked the first time in NBA history that a national broadcast network televised the ceremony, and it would be the last until NBC televised the 2025–26 banner ceremony for the Oklahoma City Thunder on opening night.

=== Music ===
After the 1990s (when the NBA arguably reached its highest point in terms of popularity) many hardcore and casual fans began to associate the league with NBC, and more accurately, NBC's theme music, "Roundball Rock". After ABC took over the NBA coverage from NBC, "Roundball Rock" composer John Tesh offered his iconic theme song to the new rightsholder, but ABC turned it down and told Tesh that they wanted a completely different song. Whereas NBC used "Roundball Rock" for all twelve years of its coverage, ABC ended up using at least nine themes in its first four years. Three of the themes were traditional sports themes, while six of them ('We Got Hoops" by Robert Randolph and the Family Band, "Can't Get Enough" by Justin Timberlake, "Let's Get It Started" by The Black Eyed Peas, "Lose My Breath" by Destiny's Child, "This Is How a Heart Breaks" by Rob Thomas and "Runnin' Down a Dream" by Tom Petty and the Heartbreakers) were contemporary pieces by known artists.

For the 2006–07 NBA season, ESPN began using "Fast Break", the theme music used for ABC's NBA broadcasts since 2004, as the theme for its own NBA games. Because of the reorganization of ABC Sports under the oversight of ESPN, and its 2006 rebranding as ESPN on ABC (which calls for all sporting events aired on ABC to utilize the same production elements as ESPN's sports telecasts), this means that games broadcast on ABC will use the same theme music from previous years. In addition, ABC selected pop group The Pussycat Dolls to perform "Right Now" as the new introduction for NBA games.

For the 2008 season, "Nine Lives" by Def Leppard and Tim McGraw was used as the new intro song for ABC's game broadcasts, and was also used by ESPN during the playoffs before the start of each game. For the 2012 NBA Playoffs, the revised version of the 1972–73 theme was introduced, incorporating features of the current NBA players from going back from the previous year to years past during the network's tenure with the NBA.

For the 2011 NBA postseason, ESPN used an updated composition of the "Fast Break" theme music for the postseason, yet the original composition was still used for the regular season through the 2015-16 NBA season.

For the 2016-17 NBA season, ESPN used another updated composition of the "Fast Break" theme music. This time, for the regular season, replacing the original composition that was first used by ABC in the 2004–05 season and by ESPN two seasons later. Maze featuring Frankie Beverly's "Before I Let Go" was added to start the courtside play-by-play commentary.

To go along with ESPN's rebranding of their NBA coverage prior to the 2022-23 season, a new theme was composed and introduced by composer Eric Hall. A remixed version of this theme is used during the NBA Playoffs and NBA Finals.

=== WNBA on ABC ===
In the early years, two women-oriented networks, Lifetime and Oxygen, also broadcast games including the first game of the WNBA. NBC showed games from 1997 to 2002 as part of their NBA on NBC coverage before the league transferred the rights to ABC/ESPN.

In June 2007, the WNBA signed a contract extension with ESPN. The new television deal ran from 2009 to 2016. A minimum of 18 games would be broadcast on ABC, ESPN, and ESPN2 each season; the rights to broadcast the first regular-season game and the All-Star Game were held by ABC. Additionally, a minimum of 11 postseason games would be broadcast on any of the three stations. Along with this deal, came the first-ever rights fees to be paid to a women's professional sports league. Over the eight years of the contract, "millions and millions of dollars" would be "dispersed to the league's teams".

== Announcers ==
=== Brad Nessler era (2002–2003) ===
After obtaining the NBA broadcast rights, ABC courted two main announcers from the NBA on NBC, Bob Costas and Marv Albert. After Costas (who was reportedly offered a generous deal which also included offers to do play-by-play for ESPN's Major League Baseball telecasts and feature reports for ABC News) elected to remain with NBC. Albert signed a six-year deal with TNT, the network went with veteran broadcaster Brad Nessler to be the lead play-by-play announcer for its NBA broadcasts. Nessler, who before that point had not been the main voice for any professional sport on television, received a call from Marv Albert's agent, soon after being hired. On the call, Nessler said in an interview with the Internet Movie Database:

I need to know everybody and you can't know everybody and Marv knows everyone... So, I'm just going to use him as a valuable resource, if it's all right with him.

Nessler was initially joined on the broadcasts by color commentator Bill Walton and lead sideline reporter Michele Tafoya. The team of Nessler and Walton did two broadcasts together before ABC decided that Walton needed a partner (much like he had at NBC with Steve Jones) and assigned pre-game analyst Tom Tolbert to join the team. Nessler, Walton, and Tolbert called most regular season games and every network playoff game. Other games were called by the team of Brent Musburger and Sean Elliott. After suffering the worst ratings in NBA Finals history for the 2003 series, low ratings overall, and harsh criticism, ABC decided to retool the team. More to the point, during this particular period, Brad Nessler was accused by media analysts (among them, New York Times columnist Richard Sandomir) of not knowing game strategy well, lacking rhythm and enthusiasm in his game call, not bringing out the best in his partners, too often ignoring the score and his tendency to stammer.

This was also the only year that ABC broadcast both the NBA and the Stanley Cup Final involving teams from one market in the same year, as both the New Jersey Nets and the New Jersey Devils were in their respective league's finals. During ABC's broadcast of Game 3 between the San Antonio Spurs and the Nets in New Jersey on June 8, Nessler said that ABC was in a unique situation preparing for both that game and Game 7 of the Stanley Cup Final between the Devils and the Mighty Ducks of Anaheim the following night. ESPN and ABC's lead NHL voice Gary Thorne mentioned this the following night, and thanked Nessler for promoting ABC's broadcast of game seven of the Stanley Cup Final.

=== Al Michaels era (2003–2005) ===
After disastrous ratings for the 2003 Finals, ABC decided to completely revamp its lead NBA broadcast team. Brad Nessler was demoted to the secondary broadcast team, where he was joined by Sean Elliott and Dan Majerle. Tom Tolbert was relegated to pre-game show duties only, and Bill Walton was removed from the network's NBA coverage altogether (however, he would remain with ESPN). Meanwhile, longtime Monday Night Football commentator Al Michaels was hired to replace Nessler as the network's lead NBA play-by-play announcer; Michele Tafoya remained as its lead sideline reporter.

Doc Rivers, a critically acclaimed analyst when he worked with Turner Sports for TNT's NBA broadcasts, became available after a 1–10 start by his Orlando Magic led to his firing as the team's coach. Rivers was hired weeks before ABC's Christmas Day season opener. He and Michaels worked that game together, one of only six they did together during the regular season (all other games Rivers worked were with Brad Nessler). During the playoffs, Michaels and Rivers worked every single telecast, including the 2004 NBA Finals, which saw significant ratings improvement.

During the 2004 NBA Playoffs, Doc Rivers was hired as head coach of the Boston Celtics. Though Rivers continued to work games with Al Michaels throughout the rest of the playoffs, ABC was forced to search for a new lead analyst for the 2004–05 season. In addition, the network dropped Brad Nessler from all NBA coverage and did not retain Sean Elliott or Dan Majerle.

Early in the 2004–2005 season, Memphis Grizzlies coach Hubie Brown, a broadcasting legend with CBS, TBS and TNT, was forced into retirement due to health issues and was soon after hired to replace Doc Rivers as Al Michaels' broadcast booth partner. Brown called his first ABC game with Michaels on Christmas Day 2004, working the highly anticipated Heat-Lakers game pitting those team's respective star players Shaquille O'Neal and Kobe Bryant. After that game, the two did not do a game together again until March 2005. Michaels began covering NBA games sporadically, doing two games in early March and three additional games in April. Meanwhile, Brown worked every week of ABC's coverage, broadcasting some games with veteran broadcaster Mike Breen. Michele Tafoya served as lead sideline reporter for all of the network's game broadcasts.

In addition to Hubie Brown, ABC added other known analysts to its NBA coverage. Jim Durham and Dr. Jack Ramsay both worked several games during the regular season, while Brent Musburger, John Saunders, Len Elmore and Mark Jackson were involved with others. Breen and Ramsay were the first secondary broadcast team to work a playoff game for ABC. Breen called three playoff games for the network in 2005, the most notable being Game 1 of the Western Conference Finals with Hubie Brown.

Al Michaels was criticized by the New York Post for not broadcasting the game and seeming uninterested in the NBA in general. Barry Horn of The Dallas Morning News said that Michaels was simply "not a basketball guy". Meanwhile, Bill Simmons said during the 2005 Finals that Michaels "shows up for these games, does his job, then drives home thinking, 'Only five weeks to the [NFL] Hall of Fame Game, I'm almost there!'" Another criticism that Michaels received was that he too often found himself making tediously long-winded explanations. In return, he would tend to talk over two or three possessions in a row (which Michaels seemed to be better suited for football and baseball broadcasts, for which he's better known for). The result was that he would hardly have time to comment on the action viewers were seeing because he was so hung up on a prior subplot or storyline that he felt the audience just had to know about. Michaels was also accused of apparently lacking the kind of enthusiasm and confidence (for instance, Michaels initially reacted to Amar'e Stoudemire's block of Tim Duncan's shot during the 2005 playoffs by calling it a "great, great contested shot") expected of a main play-by-play voice.

Michaels, who by the end of his tenure on the NBA on ABC only called a total of 37 NBA games overall with ABC (a combined thirteen regular season games), did return for the NBA Finals, which scored its second-lowest rating of all time (even though it was the first Finals in eleven years to go to a seventh game). From March 7, 2004, to April 17, 2005 – including playoff games – each game Michaels called involved either the Los Angeles Lakers (whose home city Michaels resides when not broadcasting sports events) or Sacramento Kings, a total of 21 consecutive games.

For the 2005–06 season, Al Michaels and Hubie Brown were slated to remain as ABC's main broadcast team. The duo worked that year's Christmas Day game between the Los Angeles Lakers and Miami Heat and were expected to work the NBA Finals together as well. However, that plan did not come to fruition. In 2005, the National Football League (NFL) signed a contract with NBC for the rights to the Sunday night football (a package previously held by ESPN), which in turn resulted in Monday Night Football, which Al Michaels had been broadcasting for nearly 20 years, ending its run on ABC after the league's 2005 season.

Speculation arose that Michaels would leave ABC for NBC; however, he subsequently signed a deal to remain on Monday Night Football, when it moved to ESPN in 2006. However, in the weeks leading up to Super Bowl XL, it was widely speculated that Michaels was attempting to get out of his contract with ESPN to join John Madden (who worked alongside Michaels for the previous four years on Monday Night Football as an analyst) at NBC. Michaels added fuel to the fire by refusing to state his plans, and he could not "respond to rumors... because that would become a distraction." On February 8, 2006, ESPN announced that its Monday Night Football team would consist of Mike Tirico on play-by-play, with football analyst Joe Theismann and Tony Kornheiser as analysts. ESPN explicitly stated that Michaels would not return to either Monday Night Football broadcasts or ABC's NBA broadcasts, all but assuring Michaels' departure from ABC after 30 years and joining Madden at NBC.

=== Mike Breen era (2006–present) ===
Michaels was replaced by Mike Breen, who became the lead broadcaster for an over-the-air NBA package for the first time in his career. Breen worked the 2006 Eastern Conference Finals and 2006 NBA Finals with Hubie Brown for both ESPN and ABC, as well as all the main games ABC broadcast that year. The promotion of Breen gave ABC its first consistent lead broadcaster since Brad Nessler, as Breen worked games every week. Breen previously had worked the Eastern Conference Finals for NBC in 2001 and 2002, as well as the Western Conference Finals for ESPN in 2005.

Many sportswriters and sports media analysts praised Breen, some for his explosive voice and excited calls on game-deciding and game-winning shots and others for the fact that, unlike his predecessor Al Michaels, he was already familiar with broadcasting basketball games (before NBC and ABC, he is also working New York Knicks games on MSG Network) and was essentially a basketball lifer. Despite that, he faced some criticism from those who complained that they would prefer a more established voice, such as Marv Albert or Kevin Harlan. Hubie Brown faced criticism from writers (most notably Richard Sandomir of The New York Times) as well as bloggers and viewers.

Lisa Salters also served as the lead sideline reporter for ABC's regular-season game coverage and the NBA Finals that season, filling in for Michele Tafoya while she was on maternity leave. Salters returned to her role as its secondary sideline reporter when Tafoya returned the following year. For the secondary broadcast team, ABC reunited Bill Walton and Steve Jones for game coverage. Walton and Jones worked the Christmas Day 2005 broadcast between the San Antonio Spurs and Detroit Pistons for ABC, the first game they called together since Game 4 of the 2002 NBA Finals for NBC (NBC's last NBA telecast to date). The pair worked their first broadcast with Mike Breen and worked the remainder of the season with Brent Musburger, Jim Durham and Mike Tirico. That team, along with the Breen-Brown duo, often did ESPN's Wednesday or Friday game coverage, which the previous ABC announce teams rarely did.

ABC also used several SportsCenter reporters, including Tom Rinaldi, Rachel Nichols and Jeremy Schaap, for pregame and halftime features during 2006.

==== 2006–07 thru 2018–19 ====
For the 2006–07 NBA season, ABC's sports operations were fully integrated into ESPN (rebranding the sports division as ESPN on ABC). As a result, Mark Jackson replaced Hubie Brown as ABC's lead analyst (Brown would still pair with Mike Breen on ESPN's primary broadcast team and Mike Tirico on ABC's secondary team). ABC's pre-game show, which Jackson was a part of, also began to be broadcast from the site of the main game each week (much as was the case during first season of the network's current NBA deal in 2003).

Additionally, Michele Tafoya returned as a sideline reporter, after sitting out the 2005–06 season on maternity leave. Lisa Salters returned to her role as its secondary sideline reporter the following year as Tafoya returned to her old role.

On July 9, 2007, it was announced by Dan Patrick that he would be leaving ESPN after 18 years with the network. Stuart Scott hosted ABC's pregame show for the 2007–08 season along with analysts Bill Walton and Michael Wilbon. Jeff Van Gundy also joined Mike Breen and Mark Jackson full-time, starting Christmas Day. After Walton had back problems in February, Jon Barry replaced him for the rest of the season.

Michele Tafoya left her role as NBA sideline reporter for ABC after the 2007–08 season to spend more time with her family; however, she continued to work for ESPN, primarily serving as a sideline reporter for Monday Night Football (before leaving for NBC in 2011 to serve that same position for Sunday Night Football). Doris Burke, who already served as an analyst for ESPN's NBA telecasts, replaced Tafoya as lead sideline reporter on the ABC broadcasts.

Lisa Salters served as a substitute for Burke in the event she is on assignment or is slated to handle analyst duties for the NBA on ESPN, with Heather Cox filling in as part of the secondary announcing team for Salters, when she is working within the primary broadcast team. Cox took over the secondary role in 2012 after Salters became a full-time sideline reporter for Monday Night Football, with either Chris Broussard, J. A. Adande or Holly Rowe serving as the secondary reporter whenever Cox was assigned as the lead reporter.

As of April 2015, the main broadcast team consisted of Mike Breen, Mark Jackson, and Jeff Van Gundy, while the secondary broadcast team consisted of Mike Tirico and Hubie Brown, with either Mark Jones, Ryan Ruocco or Dave Pasch filling in when Tirico had other commitments. The NBA Countdown studio team consisted of host Sage Steele, and analysts Jalen Rose and Doug Collins. ABC's second team of Tirico and Brown also comprised the lead team for NBA Finals coverage on ESPN Radio, with Kevin Calabro subbing in for Tirico on some occasions.

Jackson briefly left the broadcast booth to serve as head coach of the Golden State Warriors from 2011 to 2014. Before the 2011–12 season, ABC reassigned Stuart Scott to another role while the studio team worked without a main host in a more free-flowing approach. This experiment ended before the 2013–14 season, when Sage Steele became the lead host of Countdown. Magic Johnson, Jon Barry, Michael Wilbon, Bill Simmons, and Chris Broussard have previously served as analysts for NBA Countdown.

For the 2016–17 season, Mark Jones replaced Mike Tirico as part of the secondary broadcast team with Hubie Brown as Tirico left for NBC. Also, Doug Collins left NBA Countdown and joined ESPN's roster of game analysts, returning to a position he previously held while working with NBC and TNT. Steele was replaced as host by Michelle Beadle during the season.

==== Since 2019–20 ====
For the 2019–20 season, ABC's pregame show was completely revamped. ESPN decided to drop Beadle, who had been granted a buyout at the company, and Chauncey Billups, though he would remain with ESPN as a regular game analyst until he left the company to take a coaching job with the Los Angeles Clippers. Beadle's role would end up being split between Maria Taylor, who also worked ABC's college football game of the week, and Rachel Nichols, host of the popular ESPN show The Jump. Richard Jefferson and Jay Williams were brought in to replace Billups, with the network retaining Jalen Rose and Paul Pierce. Nichols would also be ABC's pregame host for the NBA Finals. ESPN also decided to replace NBA Countdown with The Jump for their NBA Saturday Primetime pregame show. NBA Countdown would remain the main pregame show for NBA Sunday Showcase.

Those plans did not continue as planned after March 8, as the NBA suspended play due to the coronavirus pandemic. Because of that, Nichols resorted to the NBA Bubble at the ESPN Wide World of Sports Complex at the Walt Disney World Resort in Orlando, FL, where the NBA restarted their season and held the Playoffs, where she eventually took Doris Burke's spot as sideline reporter for the Finals, meaning Taylor was elevated to host the NBA Finals on ABC, and Countdown being restored as ABC's pregame show.

For the 2020–21 season, Nichols was tapped to serve as a sideline reporter for NBA Saturday Primetime, meaning Taylor was promoted to Nichols' spot as host, with Countdown being restored as a pregame show. After he was part of an inappropriate Instagram video, ESPN quietly dropped Pierce on April 6, without replacement for the remainder of the season. Before the 2021 NBA Finals, Nichols was removed in favor of Malika Andrews after a video revealed Nichols uttering racially insensitive comments towards black colleague Taylor. Soon after, Taylor departed to join NBC Sports, and Nichols was removed from all ESPN programming.

For the 2021–22 season, Lisa Salters replaced Nichols as the primary sideline reporter, and Mike Greenberg replaced Taylor on NBA Countdown along with returning analysts Michael Wilbon, Stephen A. Smith, Jalen Rose and Magic Johnson.

Mike Breen and Jeff Van Gundy missed Game 1 of the 2022 NBA Finals due to COVID-19 protocols, and Mark Jones filled in for Breen. Jones, Mark Jackson, and Lisa Salters made history in Game 1 as the first all-black broadcast team to cover an NBA Finals game.

In Game 5 of the 2023 NBA Finals, Breen called his 100th NBA Finals game, becoming the first national TV play-by-play voice to reach the milestone, and the third overall following former Lakers announcer Chick Hearn and former Celtics announcer Johnny Most. However, that game would be Jeff Van Gundy and Mark Jackson's last assignments on the network, as both were laid off on June 30 and July 31, respectively. As a result, Doris Burke and Doc Rivers replace the pair on the lead broadcast team, the latter returning as a lead analyst for the first time since 2004 and the former becoming the first woman to call a major men's championship. The secondary team was also revamped, now featuring Ryan Ruocco, JJ Redick, and Richard Jefferson. However, Rivers left in January 2024 to become head coach of the Milwaukee Bucks, leaving only Breen and Burke on the lead team. In February, ESPN promoted Redick to the lead team of Breen and Burke.

The 2024 NBA Finals on ABC marked the first and only Finals to be called by the team of Breen, Burke and Redick, and sideline reporter Salters. This also made Burke the first woman to serve as a television analyst for a major men's professional championship event. Shortly after the Finals, however, Redick was hired to coach the Lakers, again leaving only Breen, Burke and Salters on the lead team. For the 2024–25 season, Breen and Burke were initially joined by a rotating cast of second analysts; it was then announced on February 24, 2025, that Jefferson will remain with Breen and Burke for the rest of the season.

Ahead of the 2025–26 season, ESPN changed its lead broadcast team on ABC for a fourth time since 2023, replacing Doris Burke with Tim Legler. Burke would remain with the network but in a less prominent role. The NBA Finals is also the first on ESPN/ABC in which one of the announcers is also one of the participating teams' broadcasters. Breen is the TV play-by-play announcer for the New York Knicks on MSG Network.

== Television ratings ==
Between 2012 and 2019, the NBA lost 40 to 45 percent of its viewership. While some of it can be attributed to "cable-cutting", other professional leagues, like the NFL and MLB have retained stable viewership demographics. The opening game of the 2020 Finals between the Los Angeles Lakers and Miami Heat brought in only 7.41 million viewers to ABC, according to The Hollywood Reporter. That is reportedly the lowest viewership seen for the Finals since at least 1994, when total viewers began to be regularly recorded, and is a 45 percent decline from Game 1 between the Golden State Warriors and Toronto Raptors, which had 13.51 million viewers a year earlier. Some attribute this decline to the political stances the league and its players are taking, while others consider load management, the uneven talent distribution between the conferences, and the cord-cutting of younger viewers as the main reason for the decline.

== Notes ==
Records
Preceded by SNI	NBA network broadcast partner 1965–1973	Succeeded by CBS
Preceded by NBC	NBA network broadcast partner in the United States; 2002–present with NBC (2025–present)	Succeeded by Incumbent
