= Kevin Frazier =

American sportscaster

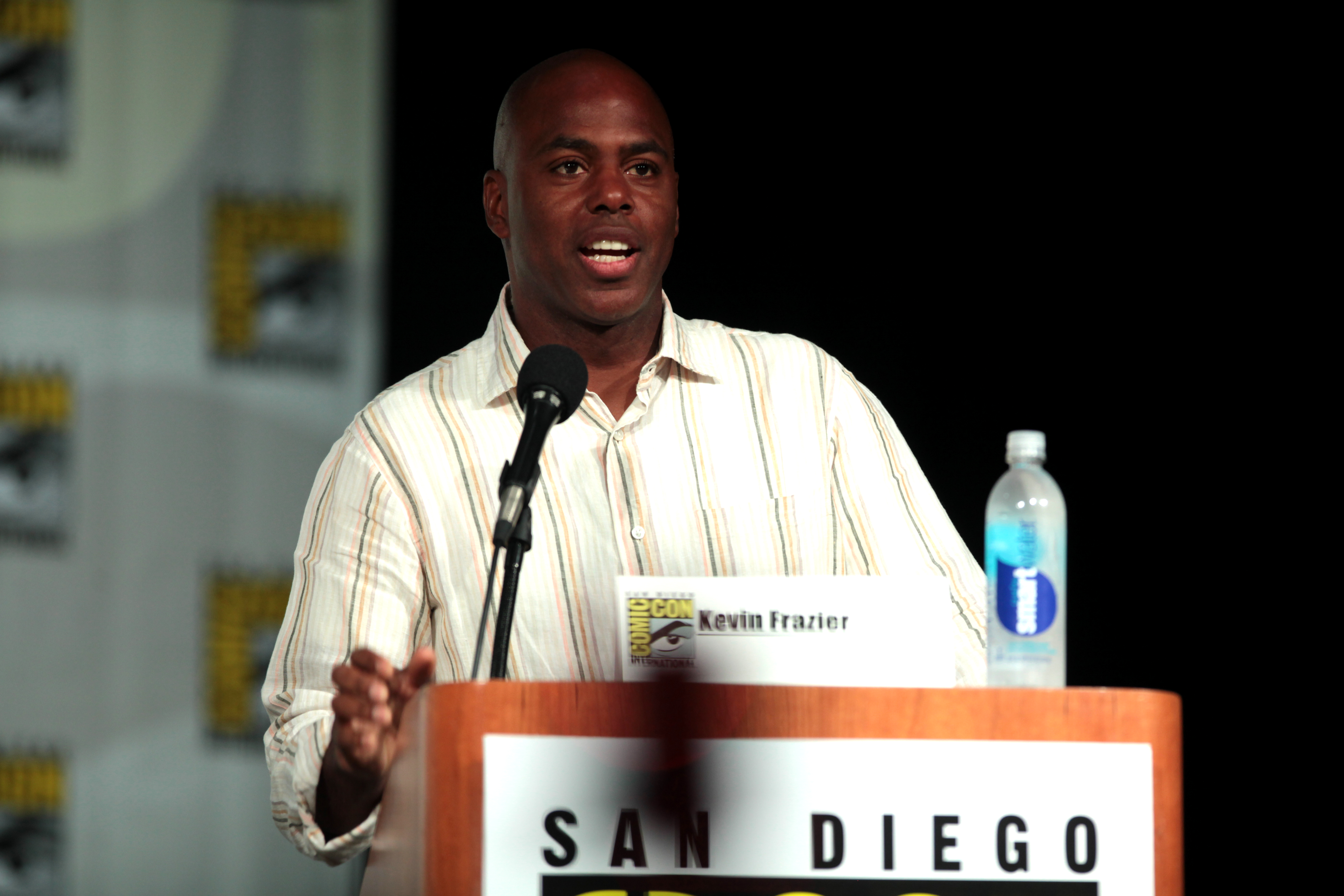
- Born: Kevin Timothy Frazier; May 20, 1964 (age 62); United States
- Education: Morgan State University
- Occupations: Television presenter, sports commentator, website creator
- Employer(s): CBS Media Ventures, Paramount Streaming
- Known for: Presenter (weekdays) of Entertainment Tonight with Nischelle Turner

Kevin Timothy Frazier (born May 20, 1964) is an American television host, widely known as co-host of Entertainment Tonight and the founder and owner of the urban entertainment website HipHollywood.com.

== Career ==
Frazier's first media job was as a news and sports reporter/photographer at WCBD-TV in Charleston, SC; when his boss took a job at WBFF-TV in Baltimore (which had just launched a news operation), Frazier followed. Frazier then joined another upstart news operation, at WXIX-TV in Cincinnati, serving as both weekend sports anchor and as a play-by-play commentator for the station's coverage of the University of Cincinnati Bearcats basketball team. During this time, he also became a sideline reporter for the newly launched NFL on Fox.

Afterwards, he moved to Los Angeles and joined Prime Sports as one of the rotating anchors of their national sports news program, Press Box; simultaneously, he hosted the short-lived FX Sports Show alongside Jim Rome. Both programs were succeeded by Fox Sports News as Fox Sports Net launched in late 1996; Frazier anchored the very first broadcast, and remained as one of the many anchors until the program (by then known as the National Sports Report) was cancelled in early 2002. While at Fox, he also co-hosted College Football Saturday, and served as an anchor and sideline reporter for other Fox Sports coverage.

After his stint at Fox, he later joined ESPN, where he hosted SportsCenter and a multitude of National Basketball Association themed programming (including NBA Shootaround, NBA Fastbreak and NBA Fastbreak Tuesday).

From 2004 to 2011, he was a correspondent for Entertainment Tonight as well as a fill-in host, and from 2011 to 2014, was a co-host of The Insider; he returned to ET in 2014, and continues as co-anchor to the present day. Frazier is also the host of Game Changers on the weekly CBS Dream Team.

Frazier has also made guest appearances in movies and TV shows, including Rat Race, One on One and Empire. He, alongside fellow FSN anchor Van Earl Wright, also appeared on the short-lived NBC sitcom Inside Schwartz, analyzing the decisions made by the lead character. Frazier has also been a forum guest on Jim Rome Is Burning.

In 2008, Frazier founded HipHollywood.com, an online web site for urban entertainment news. The company is a content partner for ET Online and The Insider, and offers news, pop culture information, photos and interviews with celebrities in music, sports, television and film.

In 2013, Frazier was signed on to host a game show pilot called The Money Pump based on an Israeli format, produced by ITV Studios America and Reshet TV for CBS where contestants compete against an enormous money pump for a chance at the $1,000,000 prize. The show never made it past the pilot stage. In 2016 Frazier was the moderator for Season 2 of Little Women: Atlanta.

== Personal life ==
Frazier attended Oakland Mills Middle and Hammond High in Columbia, Maryland. He went on to Hampton University and then graduated from Morgan State University. He is married to attorney Yasmin Cader; together they have sons Shane and Reece. Kevin has son Tony from a previous relationship.
