= Chris Connelly (journalist) =

American sports and entertainment reporter

- Born: 1957 (age 68–69)
- Education: Amherst University
- Title: Essayist; reporter

Chris Connelly (born 1957) is an American sports and entertainment reporter who currently works for ABC News for various programs and for ESPN as a contributor to its E:60 newsmagazine.

Connelly joined ESPN in 2001 to host the daily interview program Unscripted with Chris Connelly, designed to be a more contemporary version of the long-running Up Close interview show which previously occupied the 5PM ET timeslot. The show, which premiered on the same day as Pardon the Interruption, lasted only a few months before being replaced by an early SportsCenter and eventually Around the Horn.

Since the cancellation of Unscripted, Connelly has reported and narrated the long-form human interest reports that air on SportsCenter on weekends. Most notably, he annually does a one-week series called "My Wish" involving athletes fulfilling kids' Make a Wish Foundation wishes. Connelly also helped ABC and ESPN cover the Scripps National Spelling Bee in 2006; he conducted interviews with finalists who had just been eliminated. He was also the interim editor-in-chief of Grantland.com, replacing Bill Simmons, before ESPN shuttered the site in October 2015.

Before joining ESPN, Connelly worked for Rolling Stone magazine as a music critic. During the 1980s he also served as Special Music Correspondent for Good Morning America, which involved interviewing the music stars of the day. Next, Connelly spent thirteen years at MTV (1988–2001). He hosted the pre-shows for the MTV Movie Awards and prior to that, The Big Picture, a weekly show with features and movie reviews. He was also an editor and reporter for Premiere magazine, eventually becoming editor-in-chief. After six months however, Connelly resigned in a dispute over journalistic integrity after the owner of the magazine reportedly asked that he quash a story that unfavorably portrayed a business associate.

From 2000 to 2007 he was part of the ensemble of hosts for the Academy Awards preshow. All of these assignments were for ABC.
