= NBA on ESPN =

US television program

- Current logo used since the 2017–18 season
- Also known as: NBA Wednesday; NBA Friday
- Genre: American basketball game telecasts
- Presented by: Various commentators
- Country of origin: United States
- Original language: English

Production
- Production locations: Various NBA arenas (game telecasts)
- Camera setup: Multi-camera
- Running time: 210 minutes or until game ends (inc. adverts)
- Production company: ESPN

Original release
- Network: ESPN (1982–1984 and 2002–present); ESPN2 (2002–present); ABC (2006–present); ESPNews (2022–present; overflow); ESPNU (2022–present; overflow); ESPN Deportes (2004–present; Spanish audio/broadcast); Disney+ (2024–present; simulcasts); ESPN DTC (2025–present; simulcasts)
- Release: 1982 – 1984
- Release: October 30, 2002 – present

Related
- Inside the NBA; WNBA on ESPN; NBA Countdown; NBA on ABC; WNBA on ABC

The NBA on ESPN is an American television sports presentation show broadcast by ESPN. It aired from 1982 to 1984. The show returned on October 30, 2002. It consists of branding used for the presentation of National Basketball Association (NBA) games.

ABC began televising NBA games under full ESPN production in 2006 (ABC Sports aired NBA games under the title of the NBA on ABC from 2002 to 2006). On October 6, 2014, ESPN and the NBA renewed their agreement through 2025, and on July 24, 2024, its agreement was renewed through 2036.

== History ==
=== Early years: 1982–1984 ===
On January 30, 1982, the NBA reached a two-year agreement with ESPN to broadcast the league's 40 regular season and 10 playoff games from 1982–83 to 1983–84.

Initially from 1982-83 to 1983–84, ESPN aired the NBA's regular season games every Sunday.

=== 2002–present ===
On January 22, 2002, the NBA signed an initial six-year agreement with The Walt Disney Company that allowed ABC and its sister network ESPN (of which Disney owned an 80% stake) to broadcast the NBA's 75 regular season and 24 playoff games. Currently, ESPN airs games on Wednesdays and Fridays, with select games broadcast on ESPN or ABC on select Saturdays, Sundays, and Mondays, as well as much of the Christmas Day games. Regular season broadcasts on ESPN are usually billed as NBA (name of day) since the 2008–09 season. ABC holds the exclusive broadcast rights to the NBA Finals. ESPN/ABC also has the rights to air the NBA draft.

In June 2007, the NBA renewed its television agreement with ESPN and ABC through 2016, which included expanded digital rights and an increased number of playoff games on ABC and ESPN. This agreement was renewed again through 2025 in 2014.

ESPN renewed its agreement again in 2024 to take its coverage through to 2036, but with NBC Sports and Amazon Prime Video replacing TNT as broadcasters, national rights were split differently. Among the changes, ESPN's Friday schedule was reduced from spanning the entire regular season to only selected weeks and it will no longer air Sunday night games during the second half of the season as well select Monday games, ABC/ESPN coverage during the first two playoff rounds was reduced to about 18 games (with all games being exclusive rather than first round games being co-existed with RSN's), and the final season of the contract (2035–36 season) is when ABC/ESPN will not air any conference finals. As part of a separate sublicensing agreement with Disney and TNT parent company Warner Bros. Discovery, ESPN and ABC gained the broadcasting rights to TNT Sports' Inside the NBA beginning in the 2025–26 season, the first season of their renewed agreement. TNT Sports will continue to produce the show for ESPN and ABC.

During the period TNT shared the broadcast rights with the NBA, ESPN/ABC also held the exclusive rights to air the Eastern Conference Finals every even year except 2003, and the Western Conference Finals every odd year since 2005, with TNT airing the other conference finals series. Starting in 2026, ESPN would hold the rights to one Conference Finals series, occasionally with the same conference in consecutive seasons. The other Conference Final would be rotated between NBC (even-numbered years) and Prime Video (odd-numbered years) until 2035, after which NBC and Prime Video would air either Conference Final in 2036. Unlike ESPN's contract with the NHL, they don't have the first choice of which Conference Finals series to air; rather, the NBA randomly selected the broadcaster for each Conference Finals series in advance.

== Commentators ==
ESPN's best-known NBA broadcast team consists of Mike Breen on play-by-play, with Jeff Van Gundy and Mark Jackson as analysts. The trio called 15 NBA Finals together from 2007 to 2011, and again from 2014 to 2023. Other notable commentators throughout the years include Al Michaels, Mark Jones, Dave Pasch, Mike Tirico, Adam Amin, Ryan Ruocco, Hubie Brown, Richard Jefferson, JJ Redick, among others. Notable sideline reporters include Michele Tafoya, Doris Burke (later a game analyst), Israel Gutierrez, Rachel Nichols, Lisa Salters, Malika Andrews, Cassidy Hubbarth, Ros Gold-Onwude, Jorge Sedano, among others.

Since the 2017–18 season, Doris Burke became a regular analyst for the NBA on ESPN, replacing Doug Collins.

The 2021–22 season marked the addition of Beth Mowins to the roster of play-by-play commentators. She is the first woman to call an NBA regular season (and playoff) game. In the same season, JJ Redick joined the crew as analyst following his retirement from playing basketball.

In August 2023, as part of a shakeup following the company's layoffs of many of its employees and personalities, ESPN announced major changes in its commentator lineup for the 2023–24 season. The new lead broadcast team consists of Mike Breen, Doris Burke, and former NBA coach Doc Rivers. Burke will become the first female TV analyst in a major men's championship round. Burke and Rivers replace lead analysts Jeff Van Gundy and Jackson, who were laid off by the network after the 2023 NBA Finals. Additionally, a second core broadcast team consisting of Ryan Ruocco, JJ Redick, and Richard Jefferson was formed. The team calls the NBA Sunday Showcase games and works together for other marquee events throughout the season and into the playoffs. The trio debuted during the opening week of the regular season rather than the preseason, due to Ruocco's assignment for the 2023 WNBA Finals. The first game they called was the game between the visiting Dallas Mavericks and the San Antonio Spurs, notable for 2023 first draft pick Victor Wembanyama's regular season debut. That same year, Bob Myers joined the broadcast team as game analyst. After Rivers was hired as head coach of the Milwaukee Bucks in January 2024, Redick joined Breen and Burke on the lead team. Ahead of the 2024–25 season, ESPN started using a rotating cast of second analysts to join Breen and Burke after Redick became head coach of the Los Angeles Lakers; ESPN then announced on February 24, 2025, that Jefferson will remain with Breen and Burke for the rest of the season. They also added Tim Legler, Cory Alexander and Jay Bilas as game analysts, and also hired Minnesota Timberwolves TV play-by-play announcer Michael Grady. Shams Charania replaced Adrian Wojnarowski as NBA insider before the season.

Ahead of the 2025–26 season, ESPN replaced Doris Burke with Tim Legler on the lead team with Mike Breen and Richard Jefferson, and Burke moved to Pasch’s crew. On April 12, 2026, Mark Jones left ESPN following his final NBA broadcast.

== Visual presentation ==
Starting with 2006–07 NBA season, ESPN used ABC's theme music from two years prior, making it the second time the network had used its corporate sibling's NBA theme. Since ABC had undergone the transition from the former ABC Sports to merge with ESPN, forming ESPN on ABC, ESPN's music, graphics, and overall presentation have been used for all of their telecasts on the network.

Following the branding merge, ESPN began to use variations of the graphics used on ESPN Monday Night Football for their NBA broadcasts. With an updated graphics package debuting on Monday Night Football during the 2008–09 season , the same graphics were introduced in the April 8, 2009 telecast of NBA on ESPN.

On March 14, 2010, the graphics were refreshed and used in the NBA on ABC "Sunday Showcase". ESPN then used the refreshed graphics for their NBA telecasts the following day. Starting with the 2010–11 season, timeout indicators were added to the score banner, adopting the feature from ESPN's college football broadcasts.

Beginning with the 2011 NBA Playoffs, an updated composition of ESPN's theme "Fast Break" was introduced for the postseason, along with new in-game presentations. The score banner and other graphics retained their design, and the original composition of "Fast Break" remained as the theme song for the regular season.

During the 2013 Western Conference Finals, a new graphics package debuted for ESPN's NBA telecasts. The graphics featured 3-dimensional renderings of the team logos, along with the use of specific themes and backgrounds to accompany each of them. During the 2015 NBA Finals, the graphics were updated to reflect the new design used in ESPN's NBA Countdown broadcasts. However, during 2015-16 NBA season, the graphics were reverted to the previous package used since 2013. On May 17, 2016, the graphics, which were first seen during the previous year's championship, were used again for the 2016 Eastern Conference Finals and NBA Finals.

For the 2016–17 NBA season, ESPN introduced a revamped on-air presentation and branding for its NBA coverage, developed with the creative agency Big Block, as well as a new logo. The new design was inspired by "premium" consumer brands, and places a heavier focus on team logos and colors as the basis of its design, as opposed to visual environments and settings. When introduced during the pre-season, the new package used a noticeably large scorebar, although it has since been reduced in size. A season later, the logo was tweaked due to change in the NBA's logo.

During every NBA Finals since 2019, the team logos are colored in gold in the scoreboard.

For the 2020-21 NBA season, ESPN introduced a new scoreboard, which is seen across the bottom of the screen (similar to Monday Night Football).

On October 6, 2022, ahead of the 2022–23 NBA season, ESPN unveiled a new visual identity for their NBA coverage. This features a new animated version of the NBA silhouette, a new 3D graphics, a flat scorebord, and a new hip-hop-influenced theme music composed by Made Music Studios. The overall identity was done by FutureDeluxe and Two Fresh. ESPN and ABC began using the 2002 NBA on TNT theme music for Inside the NBA in 2025.

== Studio shows ==
=== NBA Countdown ===
NBA Countdown, previously NBA Shootaround, is ESPN's main studio program, airing before each game telecast. ESPN's in-game studio programs originally consisted of Kevin Frazier and Tim Hardaway on Fridays with Stuart Scott replacing Frazier on Wednesdays. After horrible reviews for Hardaway, ESPN brought in Greg Anthony to replace him on Friday nights. Frazier and Anthony became ESPN's main studio team and worked most of the playoffs. For the 2003 Eastern Conference Finals, ESPN used ABC's halftime team of Mike Tirico and Sean Elliott for all the games.

2003–04 was the first year of the longest-tenured ESPN studio team. Frazier and Anthony were joined by controversial writer Stephen A. Smith and NBA legend Bill Laimbeer. Laimbeer, departing to continue coaching in the WNBA, was replaced by Tim Legler during the 2004 NBA playoffs. Smith, Legler and Anthony were joined by John Saunders (replacing Frazier, who left to host Entertainment Tonight) from late 2004 to the end of the 2005–2006 season.

ESPN's studio team has generally been more criticized than praised. After the Pacers–Pistons brawl, ESPN's studio team came under severe criticism, both by the media and by ESPN itself for their stance regarding the actions of Indiana Pacer Ron Artest (who entered the stands to confront a fan, sparking the melee). Saunders came down hard on Detroit fans, referring to them as "punks," while Anthony and Legler defended Artest.

For the 2006–07 NBA season, Saunders was replaced by Fred Hickman, with the remaining team left intact. Previous reports by The Big Lead.com and The New York Post indicated that Anthony, Legler and Smith along with Saunders would be replaced by Dan Patrick, Michael Wilbon and Mark Jackson. Smith's role was significantly reduced, as he would no longer appear in studio with Hickman, Legler and Anthony, instead appearing during "The A List", a segment during the pregame show.

The program was hosted by either Hannah Storm, Stuart Scott or Mark Jones, alongside analysts Chris Mullin, Jalen Rose, Jamal Mashburn, Jon Barry and Michael Wilbon.

The program was also moved from ABC-owned studios at Times Square in New York City to ESPN's headquarters in Bristol, Connecticut.

The format changed for the 2011–2012 season. The show moved from Bristol to ESPN's West Coast headquarters in Los Angeles. Storm, Scott and Jones were dropped from the program and the host role abandoned. Instead, four analysts (Wilbon, Barry, Magic Johnson, and Chris Broussard) discuss scores, games, and other topics in more of a free form style than previously used.

In 2023, as part of major changes to its commentary team, Malika Andrews became the new lead host of NBA Countdown.

Ahead of its season debut in the 2025–26 season, ESPN removed Stephen A. Smith from NBA Countdown. As it stands, the show's current lineup included Andrews, Kendrick Perkins, Brian Windhorst, Shams Charania and Michael Malone.

Ahead of its season debut in the 2026–27 season, ESPN announced the departure of Michael Malone to join as head coach of the North Carolina Tar Heels men's basketball team. Former Mavericks head coach Jason Kidd has joined the Countdown.

=== Inside the NBA ===
On November 16, 2024, Warner Bros. Discovery (WBD), parent company of TNT Sports, reached a settlement with the NBA involving TNT's coverage rights. WBD and Disney also entered into a sub-licensing agreement to broadcast TNT's studio show Inside the NBA on ESPN and ABC beginning the 2025–26 season, with TNT Sports continuing to produce the show with its existing personalities. Inside the NBA airs during ESPN and ABC's "high-profile live events" and "other marquee live events." For the 2025–26 season, ESPN has scheduled 20 dates where Inside the NBA would air; ESPN will continue to air NBA Countdown.

== Ratings ==
ESPN's highest rated NBA game was Game 5 of the 2006 Eastern Conference Finals between the Miami Heat and Detroit Pistons. The game scored a 5.5 cable Nielsen rating, with nearly five million viewers. To put that in context, Monday Night Football on ESPN posted ratings of 9+ in two of its first three telecasts. ESPN's highest rated regular season contest was the first matchup between Shaquille O'Neal and Yao Ming. The game between the Los Angeles Lakers and Houston Rockets scored a 3.82 cable Nielsen rating.

Generally, ESPN's regular season ratings are the same as competitor TNT's. During the playoffs, TNT has higher ratings, especially during the Conference Finals (from 2003 to 2005, TNT's Conference Final ratings were at least a full ratings point higher than ESPN's: 4.6 to 2.8 in 2003, 6.3 to 3.8 in 2004 and 5.0 to 4.0 in 2005). In 2006, for the first time ever, ESPN's Conference Final coverage averaged higher ratings than TNT's, averaging a 4.8 to TNT's 4.6.

== Other ESPN channels ==
=== United States ===
ESPN2 aired a handful of NBA regular season games from 2002 to 2006, typically in January, when prime time golf tournaments preempted coverage on ESPN. On several occasions, ESPN2 would air the first game of a doubleheader, while ESPN air the second game. Starting with the 2006–2007 season, regular season games on ESPN2 were discontinued. During the playoffs, ESPN2 airs games that otherwise would not have appeared on any outlet other than NBA TV, mostly on Friday nights and only during the first round.

ESPN2 NBA coverage is mostly made up of studio shows, notably NBA Coast to Coast. NBA Coast to Coast, formerly known as NBA Fastbreak Tuesday and NBA Nation, is a two-hour long Tuesday night studio show that features live cut-ins to games throughout the league. In addition to Coast to Coast, ESPN2 airs several editions of NBA Fastbreak, ESPN's NBA oriented highlight show.

Despite airing fewer than forty NBA games in its eleven years of existence, ESPN2 did televise NBA legend Michael Jordan's final game in Chicago in January 2003.

ESPN2 also aired Kobe Bryant's final game against the Utah Jazz on April 13, 2016.

ESPN2 also aired a LeBron James potential record breaking game on February 3, 2023

ESPN2 is the primary outlet for ESPN WNBA coverage, televising regular season games, the WNBA Finals and the WNBA draft. WNBA Shootaround, the WNBA equivalent of ESPN's NBA pregame show, airs sporadically on the network, typically before presentations of WNBA Tuesday.

Beginning with the 2022–23 season, ESPN2 began airing alternate presentations of select NBA games in a similar vein to Manningcast and KayRod Cast during Monday Night Football and Sunday Night Baseball respectively, with Stephen A. Smith as host. The series was titled NBA in Stephen A.'s World.

ESPNU aired two playoff games alongside NBA TV due to ESPN2 airing the NFL draft. The first came on April 28, 2017, during Game 6 of the Washington Wizards–Atlanta Hawks first round series. The next came on April 25, 2025, during Game 3 of the Indiana Pacers–Milwaukee Bucks first round series. ESPNU primarily televises NBA G League games.

ESPNews serves as an overflow channel in case the first game of a doubleheader goes overtime.

=== Canada ===
In Canada, through ESPN's partial ownership of CTV Specialty Television, TSN (which adopted ESPN's imagery since 2001) has aired selected NBA games as well as their sole Canadian franchise, the Toronto Raptors. Notable personalities include John Saunders, Leo Rautins, Paul Romanuk, Chuck Swirsky, Matt Devlin and Jack Armstrong.

== See also ==
- NBA Countdown
- Inside the NBA
- NBA on NBC
- The Decision (TV program), LeBron James' 2010 free agency announcement

Records
Preceded by None	NBA pay television carrier 1982–1984 with USA	Succeeded by TBS
Preceded by TBS	NBA pay television carrier 2002–present with TNT (2002–2025) with NBCSN/Peacock and Prime Video (2025–present)	Succeeded by Incumbent
