= Michael Lombardi (American football) =

American football executive and analyst (born 1959)

Personal information
- Born: June 19, 1959 (age 67); Ocean City, New Jersey, U.S.

Career information
- High school: Valley Forge Military Academy
- College: Hofstra

Career history
- UNLV (1981–1984) Recruiting coordinator; San Francisco 49ers (1984–1987) Scout; Cleveland Browns (1987–1989) Scout; Cleveland Browns (1989–1993) Pro personnel director; Cleveland Browns (1993–1995) Director of player personnel; Philadelphia Eagles (1998) Director of pro personnel; Oakland Raiders (1998–2006) Senior personnel executive; Denver Broncos (2007) Personnel assistant; Cleveland Browns (2013) General manager & vice president; New England Patriots (2014–2016) Assistant to the coaching staff; North Carolina (2025–2026) General manager

Awards and highlights
- Super Bowl champion (XLIX)
- Executive profile at Pro Football Reference

Michael Lombardi (born June 19, 1959) is an American football executive and former analyst. Until 2016, he was an assistant to the coaching staff of the New England Patriots and is a former analyst for the NFL Network and sportswriter at NFL.com. Lombardi also previously served as an NFL executive with the San Francisco 49ers, Cleveland Browns, Philadelphia Eagles, Denver Broncos, and Oakland Raiders. He hosts his own podcast "The GM Shuffle" formerly with Adnan Virk now with Femi Abebefe, and co-hosts a Saturday morning sports betting program on SiriusXM for Vegas Stats & Information Network along with a daily show on Vegas Stats & Information Network called "The Lombardi Line".

== Life and career ==
=== Early life ===
Lombardi grew up in Ocean City, New Jersey and played both baseball and football at Valley Forge Military Academy. He attended Hofstra University from 1977 to 1981, where he played defensive lineman and long snapper for the football team.

=== Early career ===
In 1981, Lombardi was hired as a recruiting coordinator at the University of Nevada, Las Vegas by Rebels' head coach Harvey Hyde.

=== National Football League ===
Lombardi began his NFL career in 1984 as an area scout under Bill Walsh of the San Francisco 49ers, where he stayed until 1987. He claimed credit for the initial discovery and scouting of Hall of Famer Charles Haley, who was drafted by San Francisco 49ers in 1986 NFL draft, but this claim is disputed by Walsh's son, Craig.

Lombardi joined the Cleveland Browns organization as pro personnel director in 1987. Later, he became the Browns' director of player personnel and worked under head coach Bill Belichick managing drafts, negotiating contracts and acquiring free agents.

In 1997, Philadelphia Eagles President Joe Banner hired Lombardi as a consultant to assist with the 1997 NFL draft. Banner then named Lombardi director of pro personnel of the Eagles in 1998.

Later that same year, Al Davis hired Lombardi to serve as senior personnel executive of the Oakland Raiders, a position which he held until 2007. During his tenure with the Raiders, Oakland won three consecutive AFC West titles and advanced to Super Bowl XXXVII.

In October 2012, sportswriter Jason La Canfora reported that the Cleveland Browns were considering Lombardi for their vacancy at general manager. He was hired for that position five months later. On February 11, 2014, the Browns replaced Lombardi with Ray Farmer after just one year as GM.

From 2014 to June 2016, Lombardi worked under Bill Belichick of the New England Patriots as an assistant to the coaching staff, a position created specifically for him. Speaking about Lombardi's time in New England, Belichick said, "Mike's...one of the smartest people I've worked with. He was huge asset to me for the two years he was here...he studies football and he knows it very well." On his exit from New England, Lombardi said, "At this point, after my contract with the Browns had expired [following the 2015 season], it was time for me to make a decision on what I wanted to do for the next 10 years. I’d love to stay at the Patriots, and Bill [Belichick] and I have a great relationship, however I thought it was time for me to go into another career."

Lombardi has worked as an administrator in the NFL for over 30 years and has worked for Bill Walsh, Al Davis and Bill Belichick. Sports and pop culture essayist Chuck Klosterman described Lombardi as, "a detail freak and a polymath, or at least a person successfully attempting to impersonate one" after spending time with him at the Cleveland Browns facility in the hours leading up to the 2013 NFL draft. Lombardi has also been described as, "one of the most quiet but influential executives in the NFL." He has been credited as one of the first NFL executives to study the science of scouting players for moral character.

=== NCAA ===
On December 11, 2024, Lombardi accepted a position to become the general manager for the North Carolina Tar Heels, reuniting him with Bill Belichick.

On July 27, 2026, Lombardi was placed on paid administrative leave at the start of an investigation by North Carolina's human resources department. On September 3, Lombardi resigned as general manager of North Carolina while the investigation was still ongoing. His resignation came after significant controversy regarding his roster management and treatment of players' families.

=== Broadcasting ===
As a broadcaster, Lombardi has worked for ESPN, CBS Sports, Showtime, the NFL Network and Fox Sports. He began his career as a member of the media in 1996 when he spent part of that year as an NFL draft analyst for ESPN. He also spent portions of 1998 and 1999 as an editorial consultant and studio analyst for CBS Sports as on-air talent for the NFL Today pre-game show.

In 2008, Lombardi joined NFL Films' Inside the NFL, a weekly Showtime series where he provided analysis alongside host James Brown and former NFL players Cris Collinsworth, Phil Simms and Warren Sapp. That same year, Lombardi began contributing to several NFL Network shows, including as an in-studio analyst and reporting live from individual games.

Lombardi was hired by Fox Sports in September 2016. When he joined Fox, national networks president Jamie Horowitz said in a statement, "Michael is a thought-provoking and insightful football analyst with an impressive résumé. We feel like his blunt approach and original perspective makes the FS1 shows more interesting, and the fans of those shows more informed."

=== Digital media ===
In 2010, after working as on-air talent at the NFL Network for two years, Lombardi began writing columns for NFL.com, duties he performed until 2012. Lombardi has also contributed writing to Sports Illustrated and the National Football Post, the latter of which he founded and served as editor-in-chief for three years. In January 2017, Lombardi took a position with The Ringer where he hosted the "GM Street" podcast with Tate Frazier and also wrote articles on occasion for the website. He announced via Twitter in March 2019 that he had left The Ringer to work on his own podcast. He currently hosts The GM Shuffle podcast with Femi Abebefe and co-hosts a program called The Lombardi Line for VSiN Vegas Stats & Information Network.

In September 2017, Lombardi made headlines by criticizing Philadelphia Eagles coach Doug Pederson: "He might be less qualified to coach a team than anyone I’ve ever seen in my 30-plus years in the NFL." In the following season, Pederson won Super Bowl LII.

In 2020, Lombardi became a co-host on Hammer Dahn, a gambling podcast from Pat McAfee Inc.

From September 2024 through January 2025, Lombardi hosted a podcast with Belichick about the NFL called Coach with Bill Belichick.

=== Writing ===
Lombardi has written two books. Gridiron Genius: A Master Class in Winning Championships and Building Dynasties in the NFL was published in September 2018.

His second book was published in September 2023 and is called Football Done Right: Setting the Record Straight on the Coaches, Players, and History of the NFL.

== Personal life ==
He and his wife, Millie, have two sons: Matt, who was the assistant wide receivers coach for the Las Vegas Raiders; and Mick, who is the quarterbacks coach for the San Francisco 49ers. Lombardi is not related to Green Bay Packers coaching legend Vince Lombardi.

He is an avid reader with an interest in Robert Caro's biography of Lyndon B. Johnson.
