= Jonah Keri =

Canadian writer (born 1974)

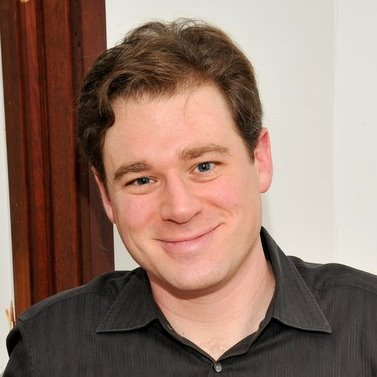
- Born: September 20, 1974 (age 52); Montreal, Quebec, Canada
- Occupations: Journalist, Columnist
- Writing career
- Genres: Sports, Entertainment, Business

Jonah Keri (born September 20, 1974) is a Canadian former journalist, sportswriter, and editor. In 2022, he was incarcerated after pleading guilty to multiple counts of domestic violence offences.

== Early life and education ==
Keri is from Montreal, Quebec. Growing up, Keri was a fan of the Montreal Expos, something he attributes to his grandfathers' love of baseball. He remains one despite the team's 2005 relocation to Washington to become the Washington Nationals.

Keri worked as a summer intern at the Montreal Gazette. He graduated from Concordia University's journalism program in 1997.

== Career ==
Keri is mostly known for writing about baseball, though he has also covered other sports as well as business and entertainment. His writing has appeared on ESPN.com, The Wall Street Journal, FanGraphs, GQ, The Huffington Post, The New York Times, Bloomberg Sports, Baseball Prospectus, Investor's Business Daily, Sports Illustrated, Grantland, FiveThirtyEight, CBSSports.com, The Athletic, and Sportsnet.

Keri co-wrote and edited the book Baseball Between the Numbers: Why Everything You Know About the Game Is Wrong. He also wrote the New York Times Bestseller The Extra 2%: How Wall Street Strategies Took a Major League Baseball Team from Worst to First, about the Tampa Bay Rays.

In March 2014, he published Up, Up, and Away: The Kid, the Hawk, Rock, Vladi, Pedro, le Grand Orange, Youppi!, the Crazy Business of Baseball, and the Ill-fated but Unforgettable Montreal Expos, which details the franchise history of the Expos. The book was a No. 1 Canadian bestseller.

Keri hosted a podcast, where he interviewed notable personalities from sports and entertainment, including Canadian Prime Minister Justin Trudeau and NBA legend Shaquille O'Neal. The Jonah Keri Podcast was found at CBSSports.com and on iTunes.

Keri also appeared as himself during the first season of the IFC series Brockmire in the episode titled "Old Timers Day."

== Domestic violence charges and conviction ==
Keri was arrested for assaulting his wife on July 18, 2019. He was granted bail the next day after being charged with three counts of assault causing bodily harm and uttering death threats. Court documents said the alleged attacks took place in July 2018, May 2019, and July 2019. Hours after his court appearance, The Athletic suspended Keri "pending further information.”

Keri was arrested again on November 27, 2019, and charged with violating his bail conditions. Keri was arrested for a third time on December 10, 2019, and charged with eight new counts of domestic violence-related charges including assault, assault of a minor, and criminal harassment. Keri had at least three court appearances in early 2020 (January, March, and April) related to all 13 criminal charges. He pleaded guilty on August 30, 2021.

On March 23, 2022, Keri was sentenced to 21 months in prison, more than prosecutors had requested. Keri must also serve two years probation and will be prohibited from possessing weapons for 10 years. Quebec Court Justice Alexandre Dalmau also prohibited Keri from contacting his victims or coming within 50 metres (160 ft) of them. In August 2022, his first request for parole was rejected.
