= Marc Stein (reporter) =

American journalist

Marc Stein is an American sports reporter who publishes a newsletter covering the National Basketball Association (NBA) nationally. He previously worked for ESPN and The New York Times.

== Career ==
While being a B.A. communications student in California State University, Fullerton, Stein started covering the NBA with his reportage for the Orange County Register. He then covered the Los Angeles Lakers and Los Angeles Clippers for the Los Angeles Daily News and also worked for The Washington Post, The Orange County Register and San Bernardino Sun. Stein covered the NBA for more than five years at The Dallas Morning News, first as a Dallas Mavericks beat writer for three seasons (1997–2000) and then two seasons as an NBA columnist.

Stein began writing for ESPN.com in 2000, and signed on full-time in 2002 to serve as the site's senior NBA writer. He also made regular broadcast appearances as a reporter and analyst for SportsCenter, NBA Shootaround, NBA Fastbreak, NBA Coast to Coast, ESPNEWS, and ESPN Radio. In October 2016, ESPN signed Stein to a multiyear contract extension. In November 2016, the Dallas Mavericks revoked Stein and fellow ESPN reporter Tim MacMahon's press credentials after MacMahon was shifted away from covering the team full-time. The credentials were later restored.

Stein covered soccer earlier in his career. He has continued to cover the game part-time. From 2011 until his departure from ESPN, he co-hosted Soccer Today, a radio show/podcast that aired on KESN ESPN 103.3 in Dallas/Fort Worth. He also occasionally contributed to ESPN FC.

Stein was fired from ESPN in 2017. In October 2017, he became the national NBA writer for The New York Times.

On February 15, 2019, Stein was named the 2019 winner of the Curt Gowdy Media Award for print media by the Naismith Memorial Basketball Hall of Fame. In 2021, he left The New York Times to self-publish a newsletter.
