= Chad Ford =

American academic and sportswriter

- Born: 1971 (age 54–55); Kansas City, Missouri, U.S.
- Education: Brigham Young University - Hawaii (B.A.); George Mason University (M.S.); Georgetown University (J.D)
- Occupations: Teacher, consultant, mediator
- Spouse: Amanda Ford
- Children: 4

Chad Ford (born 1971) is an Associate Professor of Religious Studies at Utah State University, specializing in intercultural and religious peacebuilding. He served as the director of the Brigham Young University–Hawaii's McKay Center for Intercultural Understanding from 2005-2021 and is known for his study of conflict resolution with an emphasis on large group ethnic and religious conflict, as well as for his sports journalism with ESPN. He is the author of the books "Dangerous Love: Transforming Fear and Conflict at Home, at Work, and the World" and "Seventy Times Seven: Jesus's Path to Conflict Transformation."

== Early life ==
Ford grew up in Kansas City, Missouri, in 1971. He holds a B.A. in history at Brigham Young University (1995), an M.S. in conflict analysis and resolution at George Mason University (2000), and a J.D. in Law at Georgetown University. He completed an internship with INCORE, a United Nations conflict policy research center in Northern Ireland.

== Career ==
Before joining the faculty of Brigham Young University in 2005, Ford co-founded sportsTALK.com with Jason Peery in 1996 which was sold to ESPN in 2001 and was renamed Insider. Ford contributed to the subscription's content. He was known for his "insider information" and breaking news on NBA stories, especially regarding the draft, trade rumors, and international basketball. By 2005, 350,000 paying Insider subscribers read his daily reports for ESPN.

In 2015, Ford's draft boards from 2009 through 2013 were discovered to have been retroactively altered to make them appear more accurate than they had been. Ford denied any involvement. On April 28, 2017, he was laid off by ESPN alongside about 100 others at the network.

As a mediator and facilitator, Ford works for several projects around the world, including in the Middle East with PeacePlayers International. Additionally, he served as the managing director of global peacebuilding (2007), teaches at BYUH while directing the university's McKay Center. The center functions as a cross-cultural peacebuilding laboratory for the education of students, faculty, staff and community members. The theoretical and practical tools learned in the center enable the sponsorship of community building, cultural leadership opportunities and projects throughout the world.
