= J. A. Adande =

American sports journalist (born 1970)

- Born: 1970 (age 55–56); Los Angeles, California, U.S
- Education: Northwestern University
- Employer: Northwestern University
- Title: Director of Sports Journalism

J. A. Adande (/əˈdɑːndeɪ/; born 1970) is an American sportswriter, commentator and educator, who currently serves as the Director of Sports Journalism at Northwestern University.

== Early life and education ==
Adande was born in Los Angeles, to Desire Adande and Elizabeth Oberstein, a dance professor at El Camino College. Oberstein died in 2000, after her battle with cancer. Adande's grandfather, Gerson "Gus" Oberstein (1914–2003), was a violinist who had played with jazzmen Joe Roland and Charlie Parker, and with the Berkeley Symphony for twenty years.

Adande attended Crossroads School in Santa Monica, California, where he served as sports editor and co-editor-in-chief of the student newspaper and graduated in 1988.

Adande earned a BA in journalism from Medill School of Journalism at Northwestern University in 1992. He was sports editor of The Daily Northwestern, the student newspaper, and interned with Los Angeles Times, Miami Herald, and Washington Post.

== Career ==
After graduating from Northwestern, Adande held full-time reporter jobs at the Los Angeles Times, Chicago Sun-Times, and Washington Post.

From 2004 to 2015, he taught sports journalism classes at the University of Southern California.

Adande joined ESPN.com as an NBA columnist in August 2007. The panel at Around the Horn all congratulated him on the job and played a joke "Buy or Sell" segment about Adande's comments about joining ESPN. He was an NBA analyst on SportsCenter.

He was a regular panelist on ESPN's Around the Horn (ATH), starting in 2007, and after a period away, returned as a panelist in January 2018. He was formerly an American sports columnist and sideline reporter who covered the National Basketball Association for ESPN, and was also a regular guest host on ESPN's Pardon the Interruption television shows. Adande is a member of the National Association of Black Journalists, and also served as an adjunct professor at the University of Southern California's Annenberg School of Journalism.

Adande announced via Twitter in August 2017 that he was relocating to Chicago and becoming director of the new sports journalism program at Northwestern University, as well as a faculty member of the Medill School of Journalism.

During his time at ESPN, Adande covered the Olympic Games, Wimbledon, the Super Bowl, the NCAA Final Four, and the NBA Finals.

Adande was honored as the 2024 Curt Gowdy Print Media Award Recipient from the Naismith Memorial Basketball Hall of Fame.
