= Ric Bucher =

American sports journalist (born 1961)

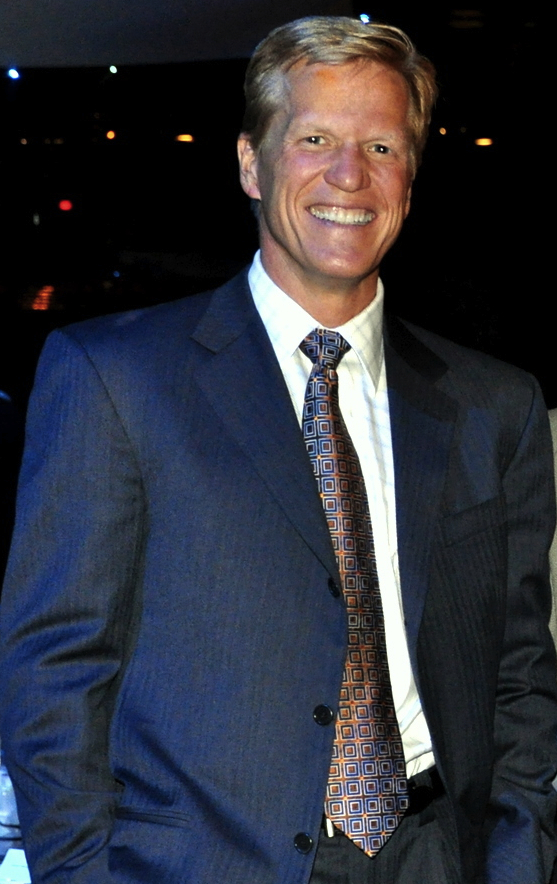
- Bucher in 2008
- Born: Richard Mathias Bucher; 1961 (age 64–65); Cincinnati, Ohio, U.S.
- Education: Dartmouth College, '83; B.A. English
- Title: Sportswriter; Reporter

Richard Mathias Bucher (born 1961) is an American NBA analyst for Fox Sports and an occasional former host of FS1's "Speak" (formerly known as "Speak For Yourself") afternoon talk show. He also hosts a daily podcast, "On The Ball with Ric Bucher." Before joining Fox he was a SiriusXM radio host and senior writer with Bleacher Report. He has appeared on NBA TV as an analyst and on TNT as a sideline reporter for NBA telecasts. Prior to joining SXM, TNT and BR, Bucher worked as an NBA Insider for Comcast SportsNet Bay Area and co-hosted Bucher, Towny and Huff mornings on 95.7 The Game. Bucher's first national platform was as an NBA analyst for ESPN and ESPN.com beginning in 1998. He served as a senior writer for ESPN The Magazine and a columnist for ESPN.com. He joined FOX in 2019.

Born in Cincinnati, Ohio, Bucher graduated from Walnut Hills High School (1979) and Dartmouth College (1983), playing four years on both schools' varsity soccer teams. He has covered the NBA since 1992–93, and has been a professional writer for 26 years. He was a beat writer for the San Jose Mercury News and The Washington Post before joining ESPN.
