= Kosner =

Kosner is a surname. Notable people with the surname include:

- Edward Kosner (born 1937), American journalist and author
- John Kosner (born 1960), American digital media executive, son of Edward

== See also ==
- Konner
- Kostner
