= Head-Royce School =

Private school in Oakland, California, US

Anna Head School Building
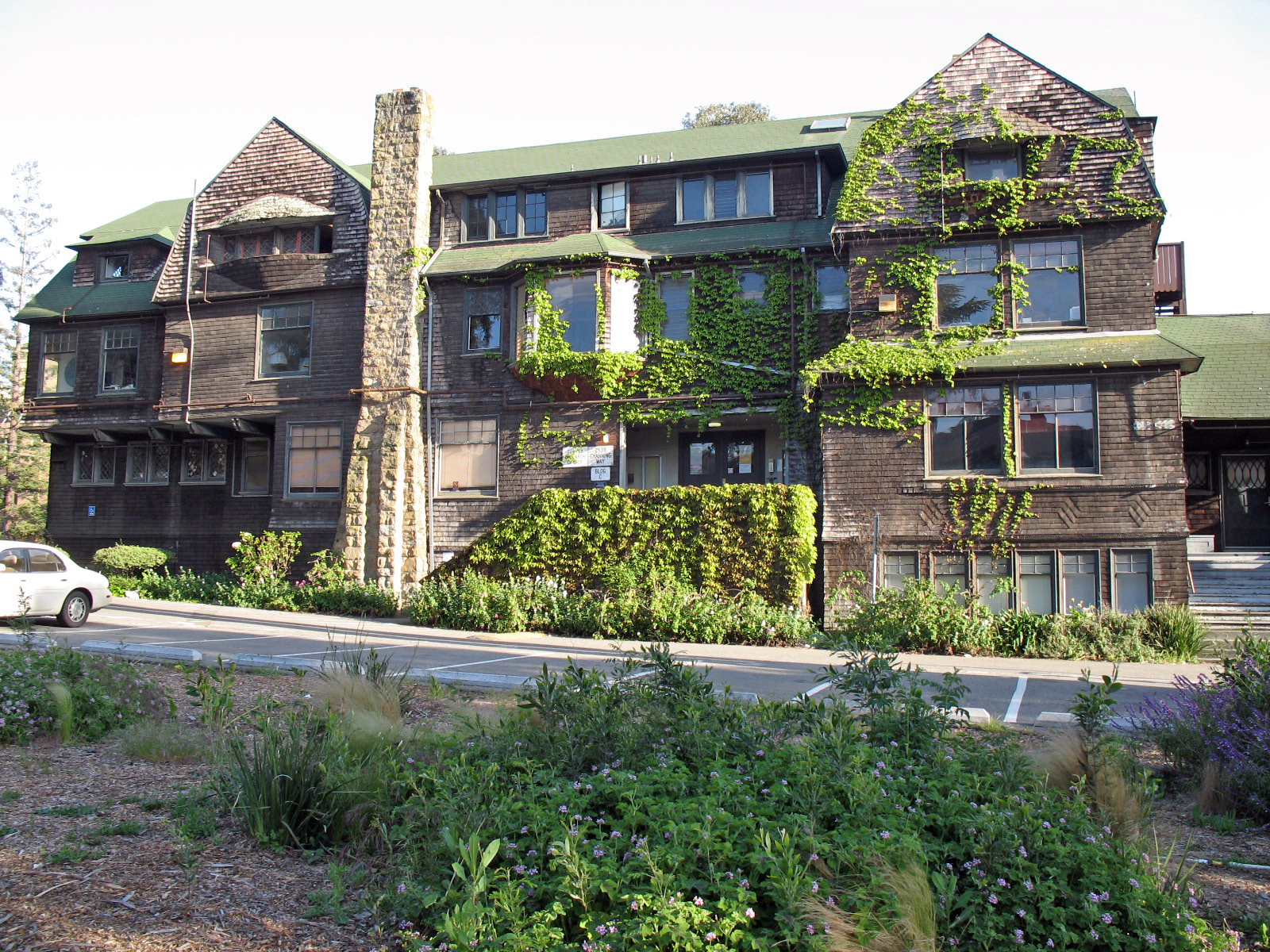

Location
- 4315 Lincoln Avenue; Oakland, California; United States; 37.80802°N 122.20515°W

Information
- Type: Private
- Motto: Character, Intellect, and Creativity
- Established: 1887
- Interim Head of School: Ricky Lapidus
- Faculty: 200
- Enrollment: 921
- Average class size: 16
- Student to teacher ratio: 7:1
- Campus: 22 acres (0.09 km^{2}), Suburban
- Colors: Forest green & Gold
- Athletics: 11 sports
- Athletics conference: BCL East
- Mascot: Jayhawks
- Website: headroyce.org
- Head-Royce School
- U.S. National Register of Historic Places
- Berkeley Landmark
- NRHP reference No.: 80000795
- BERKL No.: 45

Significant dates
- Added to NRHP: August 11, 1980
- Designated BERKL: November 16, 1981

Head-Royce School (Head-Royce or HRS) is a private co-educational college-preparatory K-12 school in Oakland, California. The forerunner of Head-Royce was the Anna Head School for Girls in Berkeley, founded in 1887. Relocated to its current site in 1964, Anna Head School for Girls merged with the neighboring Royce School in 1979 to form the present-day Head-Royce School.

Head-Royce is composed of three divisions. The Lower School consists of kindergarten through 5th grade. The Middle School is composed of the 6th, 7th, and 8th grades. Finally, the Upper School encompasses 9th through 12th grades. Most new students enter Head-Royce in kindergarten, 6th grade, or 9th grade.

== History ==
The school was founded in 1887 by Anna Head as the Anna Head School for Girls, at 2538 Channing Way in Berkeley, California.

In 1955, the University of California, Berkeley acquired the school's property by writ of eminent domain. The school was relocated to the Oakland Hills, and a new campus was constructed by 1964.

In 1971, the school's Board of Trustees established a co-ordinate school for boys, The Royce School, named in honor of philosopher (and Anna Head's brother-in-law), Josiah Royce. In 1979, the schools completed the transition to become a fully co-educational school, with its current name.

== Admissions and tuition ==
Evaluation for acceptance depends upon the division to which the applicant wishes to be admitted.

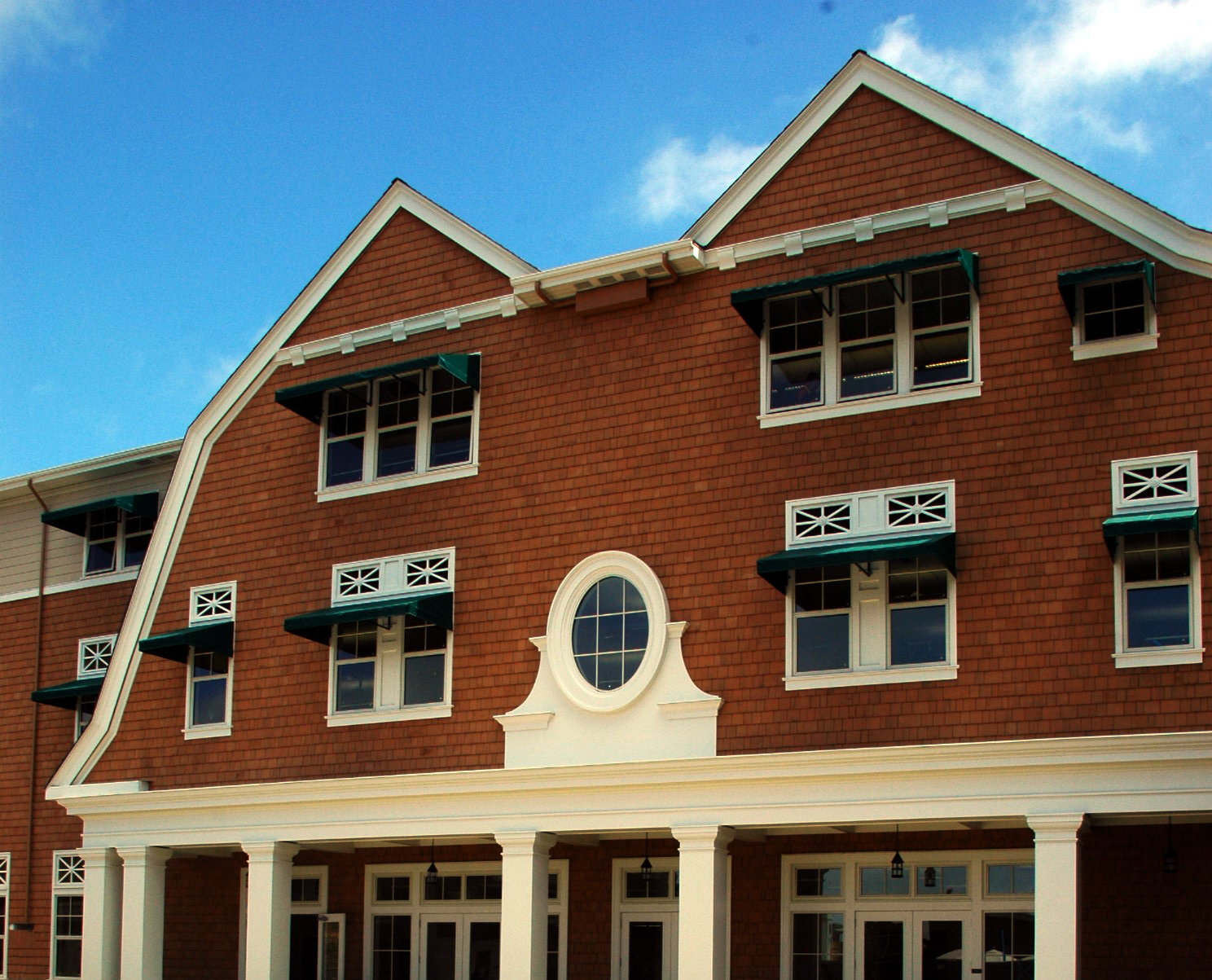
Upper School building and café

The admissions process for the high school is generally composed of testing through a proprietary test or an Independent School Entrance Examination (ISEE), transcript and relevant history, recommendations, and an interview; in addition, a student evaluation may influence the final decision. Head-Royce claims a selective admissions rate that is competitive with many American colleges.

Head-Royce participates in the National Association of Independent Schools' School and Student Service for Financial Aid. In 2025, over $7,000,000 worth of need-based grants were provided to K-12 students.

== Academics and student life ==
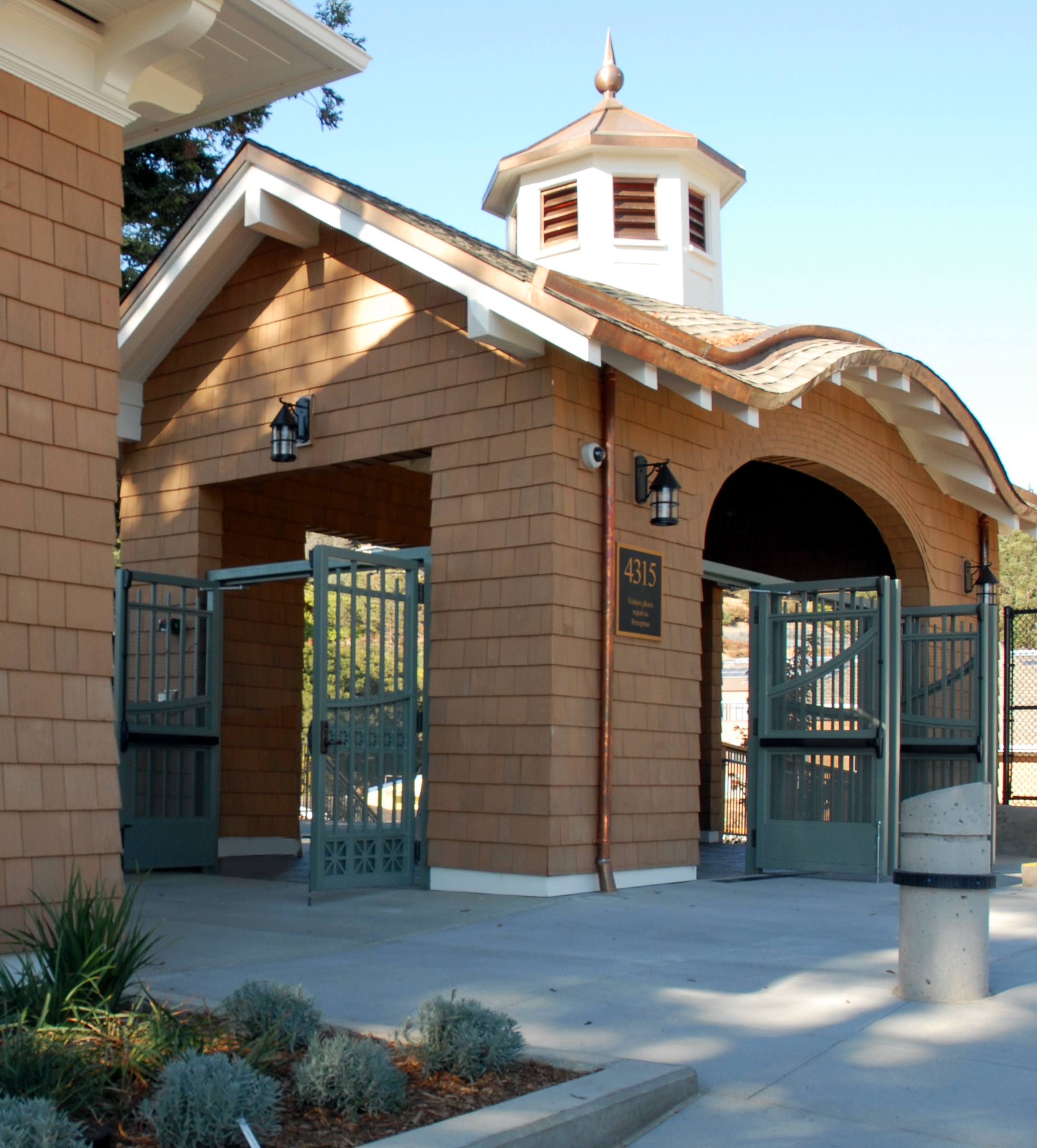
Salutation gate designed by John Malick & Associates

Head-Royce students complete a college-preparatory curriculum including mandatory courses in English; mathematics; American history; European history; physics; chemistry; biology; foreign language; fine arts; and physical education, as well as a rotating group of elective courses in science, English and history in the senior year. These senior elective courses have covered such topics as astronomy, robotics, Shakespeare, Japanese literature, psychology, the history of Islam, and many others.

Additional graduation requirements include completion of a prescribed amount of approved community service activity, and completion of a "senior project" in lieu of final exams at the end of the senior year, involving logging 80 hours toward a specific endeavor of the student's choosing.

The school newspaper is The Hawk's Eye, which publishes monthly.

== Athletics ==

Head-Royce's mascot is a Jayhawk named Tuffy. The high school competes as a member of the Bay Counties League - East (BCL East). The middle school competes as a member of the Bay Area Interscholastic Athletic League (BAIAL). Its rival is The College Preparatory School, commonly known as 'CPS'.

Athletic facilities on campus include the Paul Chapman Pavilion (commonly referred to as "the gym") for basketball and volleyball, three tennis courts (each named), and the Farley Field with the Jesse Becherer Diamond for soccer, baseball, softball, and lacrosse. Head-Royce also has several small practice basketball courts spread around campus. A new drainage system was installed underneath the field in the winter of 2005–2006 to prevent mud patches which had become a problem. The school has also installed a running path on a hill above the field which can be used for recreational running. The field is now made of turf. A swimming pool is on campus for lower school swim lessons, PE classes, and the swim team, but it is not of regulation size and therefore does not host many meets. The golf team plays at Lake Chabot Golf Course, which is near the school. No plans to improve the athletic facilities have so far been revealed in the master plan.

In the 2005–2006 school year, the middle school varsity boys teams (high school class of 2010) went undefeated and won the championship in all three of their sports (soccer, basketball, and baseball). This is the first time in league history that the same school has won all three championships and gone undefeated in the three sports.

The high school men's varsity basketball team and women's varsity soccer team have won the BCL championship six years in a row. In the 2006 season, the women's varsity volleyball team won the BCL championship. The men's varsity soccer program has been extremely successful with multiple BCL championships and two NCS Championship appearances in the last 4 years. The men's varsity volleyball program were BCL champions in 2006 and 2007 and came in second in NCS in 2006. In 2009, the men's varsity baseball program won the NCS Championship. In 2010 the men's varsity soccer, basketball, and tennis programs all won the BCL championship. The 2012–2013 women's varsity soccer team made history by advancing all the way to the NCS Championship game.

In 2016, the women's varsity volleyball team won the CIF State Division V championship, the first statewide team championship in the school's history.

In 2017, the men's varsity soccer team won the North Coast Sectional (NCS) Division 2 title vs. Making Waves Academy by a score of 2-1. It was the first men's varsity soccer title win in school history. The Jayhawks ended the season 18-1, and ranked as the top men's team in the state of California for the fall soccer season . They won again in 2018 as well.

In 2022-2023, the men's varsity soccer team won the North Coast Sectional (NCS) Division 1 title vs, Making Waves Academy by a score of 2-0. It was the 150th win for Jayhawk coach John Miottel, and the third title in school history. The Jayhawks ended the season 16-3-2, ranked number 3 in California for the fall soccer season. There was even a documentary made about this historical soccer season, featuring multiple seniors that season. The team featured many players who would go on to continue their soccer careers in other facets, with some playing division 1 - division 3 soccer as well as semi-pro and low tier professional leagues.

In 2025-2026, the men's varsity soccer team won the North Coast Sectional (NCS) Division 1 title vs Arcata by a score of 4-0. It was the fourth title in school history. It would also be the fourth title for Jayhawk head coach John Miottel. While it was easier competition, as most good teams had moved to the winter season, the Jayhawks still finished 17-3. This was good enough to be ranked number 1 in California for the fall soccer season.

=== Sports ===
==== Fall ====
- Boys'/Men's Soccer (MS, HS)
- Girls'/Women's Volleyball (MS, HS)
- Women's Tennis (HS)
- Cross Country (MS, HS)

==== Winter ====
- Boy's/Men's Basketball (MS, HS)
- Girls'/Women's Basketball (7–9, HS)
- Girls'/Women's Soccer (MS, HS)

==== Spring ====
- Baseball (MS, HS)
- Softball (HS)
- Men's Tennis (HS)
- Girls' Basketball (6)
- Men's Volleyball (HS)
- Swimming (HS)
- Track and field (HS)
- Golf (MS, HS)
- Lacrosse (MS, HS)

== Notable alumni ==
- Peter Alexander (journalist) – US national news correspondent NBC
- Rebecca Alexander – psychotherapist and author
- Kendra Andrews - sportswriter who covers the Golden State Warriors
- Malika Andrews - American journalist and reporter, ESPN sports analyst and host Of NBA Today
- Josh Birnbaum – American businessman who serves as managing director at Goldman Sachs
- Jane Connell – actress
- Adam Duritz – singer of Counting Crows
- Claire Falkenstein – sculptor and painter
- California Gibson – rancher and politician
- Cynthia Holcomb Hall – United States federal judge
- Nico Hoerner – MLB second baseman for the Chicago Cubs
- Helen Hull Jacobs – tennis champion
- MC Lars – post-punk laptop rapper
- Steven J. Law – former Deputy Secretary of Labor
- Helen Wills Moody – tennis champion
- Margaret Wentworth Owings – American environmentalist
- Libby Schaaf – American politician and former mayor of Oakland, California
- Suki Schorer – ballet dancer
- C.C. van Asch van Wijck – Dutch artist, model and sculptor
- Krista Marie Yu – actress
- Daniel Wu - actor
