= John Kosner =

American digital media executive (born 1960)

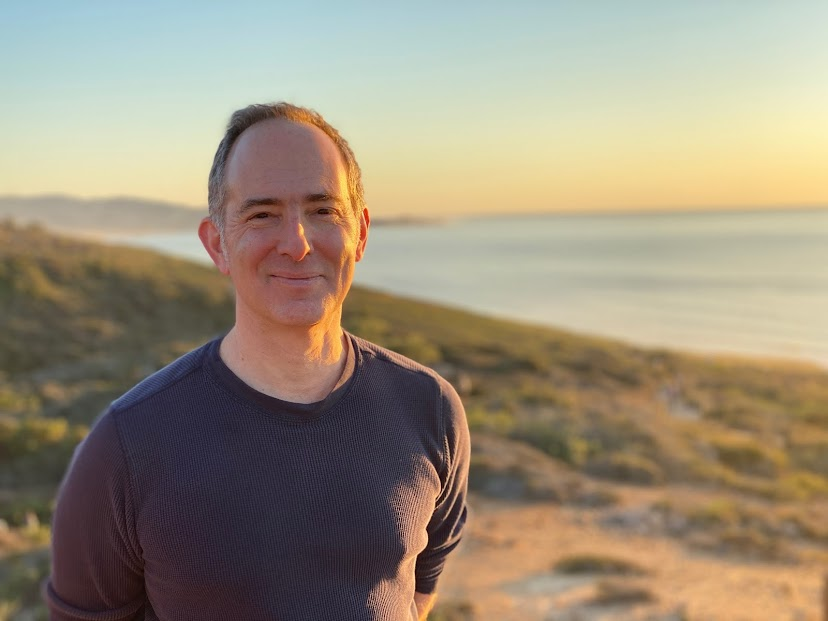
- Born: October 20, 1960 (age 65)
- Citizenship: American
- Education: Stanford University BA, 1982
- Occupation: Digital Media Executive

John Robbins Kosner (born October 20, 1960) is an American digital media executive. He is co-author with Ed Desser of the 2026 book, “We’re Live! Inside the BIG Business of Sports Media.” Currently, he is the president of Kosner Media, a digital and sports consulting company. He is also an investor and advisor in sports technology startups, a consultant, expert witness, and co-author of opinion pieces with Desser for the Sports Business Journal. John and the late NBA Commissioner Emeritus David Stern created Micromanagement Ventures, a portfolio of sports tech startups in 2018. He served as executive vice president, digital and print media for ESPN from January 2012 through June 2017. He had overseen ESPN.com since 2003 and was an employee with ESPN for over 20 years.

Prior to ESPN, Kosner was vice president, TV programming and development for Sports Illustrated. Before joining Sports Illustrated, Kosner was vice president, broadcasting for the National Basketball Association. Kosner started his career at CBS Sports in September 1982 and progressed to Manager, Programming. While at ESPN, Kosner oversaw recruitment and talent development of content teams, including Wright Thompson, Bill Simmons, Zach Lowe, Ramona Shelburne, Bill Barnwell and Sambit Bal as well as specialists like Adrian Wojnarowski, Matthew Berry and Darren Rovell. Kosner has received several honors. In 2008, he was named the most influential person in sports digital media by the Sports Business Journal.

== Personal life ==
Kosner's father, Edward Kosner, is a noted journalist who writes non-fiction book reviews for the Wall Street Journal and previously served as the editor in chief at Newsweek (where he led the magazine's coverage of the Watergate scandal), New York and Esquire magazines, and at the New York Daily News (where he led the newspaper's coverage during 9/11).

== Awards ==
SportsBusiness Journal awarded ESPN its annual award for Best in Digital Sports Media five times in 10 years and named Kosner the Most Influential in Online Media in 2008; ESPN.com also won eight Sports Emmy's and two Online Journalism Awards, including the prestigious Award for General Excellence. He has also appeared on lists of powerful and influential figures in sports media in Business Week Magazine, Daily Variety, Cynopsis, and Cablefax.
