= Malika Andrews =

American sports journalist and reporter (born 1995)

- Born: Malika Rose Andrews; January 27, 1995 (age 31); Oakland, California, U.S.
- Education: University of Portland
- Occupations: NBA sports journalist and reporter
- Years active: 2017–present
- Employer: ESPN
- Height: 5 ft 7 in (1.7 m)
- Spouse: Dave McMenamin (m. 2024)
- Relatives: Kendra Andrews (sister)

Malika Rose Andrews McMenamin (born January 27, 1995) is an American sports journalist and reporter. She is the host of NBA Today, which replaced The Jump. She joined ESPN in October 2018 as an online NBA writer and debuted as its youngest sideline reporter for a broadcast during the 2020 NBA Bubble. Andrews was named one of the Forbes 30 Under 30 in the sports industry for 2021.

== Early life and education ==
Andrews was born in Oakland, California, to Mike, a personal trainer, and Caren, an art teacher. She grew up as a fan of the Golden State Warriors. During eighth grade, she began the year at Head-Royce School and later attended a year-round therapeutic boarding school in Utah, graduating at 17 in 2012. Andrews is of Jewish descent through her mother and had a bat mitzvah in 2008.

Andrews worked at her maternal grandfather's civil rights law firm for a year before studying for a communications degree at the University of Portland and graduating in 2017. While at the University of Portland, she was a sports writer, sports editor and editor-in-chief of The Beacon, the school newspaper. While at school she reported on a player who suffered a brain bleed after crashing into a wall. Following her story in the paper, the school put up padding to prevent further injuries.

Her younger sister, Kendra Andrews, covered the Golden State Warriors for NBC Sports Bay Area. In December 2021, Kendra was hired by ESPN to cover the Golden State Warriors.

== Career ==
Andrews introduced herself at an NBA Summer League game in 2017 to ESPN's Adrian Wojnarowski, who had read her work at The Beacon. She had an internship at The Denver Post before working as a James Reston Reporting Fellow in the sports department at The New York Times. Andrews also worked for one year as a reporter for the Chicago Tribune before joining ESPN.com as a reporter covering the Chicago Bulls and Milwaukee Bucks, later moving to New York to also cover the New York Knicks and Brooklyn Nets. After the Bucks lost to the Toronto Raptors in the 2019 Eastern Conference Finals, Giannis Antetokounmpo walked out of the press conference, upset about an article that Andrews wrote saying he might leave Milwaukee if the Bucks did not make improvements to win the title before he would become a free agent in 2021. In 2020, she was one of first reporters to enter the ESPN Wide World of Sports Complex for the completion of the 2019–20 NBA season in the Bubble. Andrews led the 2020 NBA draft telecast with virtual interviews of the top draftees.

In 2021, Andrews was nominated for an Emmy in the Emerging On-Air Talent category. Andrews has been recognized by the Society of Professional Journalists, the National Association of Black Journalists and the Columbia Scholastic Press Association for her work as ESPN's only black female NBA reporter. She was named one of the Forbes 30 Under 30 in the sports industry for 2021. She makes appearances on shows such as SportsCenter, Get Up, NBA Countdown, Around the Horn and hosts NBA Today.

On July 6, 2021, Andrews was announced as ABC's sideline reporter for the NBA Finals coverage, taking over for Rachel Nichols, who was removed after audio was leaked of Nichols disparaging the network's promotion of analyst Maria Taylor as the primary host of the Finals.

In March 2022, Andrews appeared in the short film entitled Playoffs on NBA Lane, promoting the 2022 NBA playoffs, alongside now-retired sportscaster Marv Albert.

In May 2022, Andrews won the Sports Emmy for Outstanding Personality/Emerging On-Air Talent.

On June 23, 2022, Andrews made history by being the first woman to host the NBA Draft.

In December 2025, she filled in as a co-anchor for a week on Good Morning America.

== Personal life ==
Andrews confirmed she was living with her boyfriend in New York City during the start of the COVID-19 pandemic in 2020. In 2021, she moved to Los Angeles where she hosts NBA Today on ESPN. Her younger sister is Kendra Andrews who covers the Golden State Warriors for ESPN.

In October 2023, Andrews filed for a restraining order against Abubakar Ahmed, a 41-year-old man from New Jersey.

On August 24, 2024, she married longtime boyfriend and ESPN colleague Dave McMenamin in Andrews' hometown of San Francisco.
