= Bay Area Conference =

Athletic conference

The Bay Area Conference is a school athletic conference located in the San Francisco Bay Area. The league is a member of the North Coast Section, one of ten sections that comprise the California Interscholastic Federation.

== Leagues ==
The athletic conference is composed of four leagues:

=== Bay Counties League ===
The Bay Counties League comprises seven member schools in the Bay Area with enrollments over 400:

- California Crosspoint Academy
- California School for the Deaf, Fremont
- Contra Costa Christian High School
- Fremont Christian School
- Holy Names High School
- Making Waves Academy
- Cornerstone Christian (Antioch, CA)

=== Bay Counties League East ===
The Bay Counties League East comprises seven member schools in the East Bay with enrollments under 400:

- The Athenian School
- The College Preparatory School
- Head-Royce School
- Redwood Christian School
- Valley Christian School
- St. Joseph Notre Dame High School
- Bentley Upper School

=== Bay Counties League Central ===
The Bay Counties League Central comprises six member schools in the Central Bay Area with enrollments under 400:

- Drew School
- Gateway High School
- Jewish Community High School
- San Francisco Waldorf School
- The Bay School of San Francisco
- International High School of San Francisco

=== Bay Counties League West ===
The Bay Counties League West comprises seven member schools in the Western Bay Area with enrollments under 400:

- San Domenico School
- Convent of the Sacred Heart High School
- Lick-Wilmerding High School
- Marin Academy
- Stuart Hall High School
- San Francisco University High School
- The Urban School of San Francisco
