= Chotiner =

Chotiner is a surname. Notable people with the surname include:

- Isaac Chotiner, American journalist
- Murray Chotiner (1909–1974), American lawyer
