= Kendra Andrews =

American sports journalist and reporter

- Born: June 8, 1997 (age 29); Oakland, California, U.S.
- Education: Gonzaga University
- Occupations: NBA sports journalist and reporter
- Years active: 2019–present
- Employer: ESPN

Kendra Andrews (born June 8, 1997) is an American sports journalist and reporter. She covers the Golden State Warriors for ESPN. She is the younger sister of Malika Andrews, who also works for ESPN. Prior to ESPN, Andrews worked for NBC Sports Bay Area and The Athletic.

== Early life and education ==
Andrews was born in Oakland, California. Her father, Mike Andrews, is a personal trainer, and Caren Andrews, her mother, is an art teacher. She grew up as a fan of the Golden State Warriors. Andrews attended Head-Royce School in Oakland and went on to attend Gonzaga University, graduating in 2019. During her time at Gonzaga, she interned for the Associated Press where she shadowed sportswriter Janie McCauley.

Her older sister, Malika Andrews, is the host for NBA Today and is also an NBA reporter for ESPN.

== Career ==
Andrews started her career after graduating from Gonzaga, working at The Athletic and covering the Denver Nuggets.

After two years with The Athletic, Andrews returned to the Bay Area, covering the Golden State Warriors for NBC Sports Bay Area.

In 2022, Andrews joined ESPN as a writer and contributor covering the Golden State Warriors. Andrews writes about the Warriors and contributes to ESPN programs.
