= Shams–Woj rivalry =

Rivalry between sports reporters

The Shams–Woj rivalry was a rivalry between sports reporters Shams Charania of The Athletic and Adrian Wojnarowski of ESPN, the two leading National Basketball Association (NBA) insiders. The rivalry has been propelled primarily by NBA fans and media from 2017 to 2024, regarding which reporter is first to break NBA news on Twitter. Wojnarowski mentored Charania at Yahoo! Sports, and they became competitors after Wojnarowski left the company.

== Background ==
In 2007, Wojnarowski joined Yahoo! Sports as a full-time reporter, becoming the website's national NBA writer and the most prominent reporter in breaking NBA news. Charania idolized Wojnarowski in high school and joined him at Yahoo! Sports in 2015, at age 21. Wojnarowski, who served as his mentor, touted Charania as the best young basketball reporter in the world, in a tweet that has since been deleted. In 2017, Wojnarowski left Yahoo! Sports for ESPN, and Charania – his leading competitor – joined The Athletic and Stadium in the following year.

== Rivalry ==
Following Wojnarowski's departure from Yahoo! Sports in 2017, his purported competition with Charania in being the first to break news about the NBA on Twitter, including trades, signings, draft picks and injuries, gained significant attention. NBA fans and media often keep score of each reporter's performance, particularly during the NBA draft, trade deadline and free agency. In 2022, the rivalry was described as the "most intense rivalry in the NBA" by The Daily Beast. Reporter Frank Isola called it the "only real rivalry left in the NBA" due to friendliness among players. Agent Rich Paul has characterized the rivalry as beneficial for the NBA. It has also been acknowledged by players, including Patrick Beverley. The success of Wojnarowski and Charania has discouraged other reporters from attempting to break news.

The rivalry effectively ended with Wojnarowski's retirement from sports reporting in 2024, as he accepted a general manager position with his alma mater Saint Bonaventure University. Charania was eventually hired by ESPN to fill Wojnarowski's role.

The rivalry's focus on breaking news received criticism from some other reporters, including Isaac Chotiner, who quipped that "If Shams didn’t write [favorable stories to] get in good with his sources, he couldn't do the vital work of breaking news 43 seconds before everyone else." (This was not an exaggeration: in 2021, Wojnarowski beat Charania to a key scoop, James Harden's trade to the Brooklyn Nets, by eight seconds.)

== Relationship ==
Wojnarowski and Charania have not publicly acknowledged their rivalry and have declined to comment about their relationship. In 2021, four years after they stopped working together, NBA reporter Ethan Strauss alleged a falling-out between the two and that Wojnarowski expresses contempt for Charania. In 2023, Reeves Wiedeman of New York magazine likened their rivalry to a cold war. NBA reporters and officials have compared the relationship between Wojnarowski and Charania to that of Star Wars characters Darth Vader and Luke Skywalker. Their companies, ESPN and The Athletic, discourage their employees from publicizing tweets by Charania and Wojnarowski, respectively.
