= The Jump (talk show) =

Television sports talk program

- Starring: Rachel Nichols
- Country of origin: United States
- Original language: English

Original release
- Network: ESPN (or ESPN2)
- Release: February 18, 2016 – October 8, 2021

Related
- NBA Today

The Jump is an American television sports talk program that aired on ESPN (or on rare occasions ESPN2) from 2016 to 2021, hosted by Rachel Nichols, and focusing on the National Basketball Association (NBA).

== History ==
=== Season 1 (2016) ===
The Jump premiered on February 18, 2016, on ESPN hosted by Nichols. The show also featured contributions from Tracy McGrady, Stephen Jackson, Byron Scott, Ramona Shelburne, Brian Windhorst, Israel Gutierrez, Amin Elhassan, Tom Haberstroh and Marc Stein.

=== Season 2 (2016–17) ===
For the 2016–2017 NBA season, The Jump moved to ESPN2 until Super Bowl LI, when the show moved back to ESPN. Scottie Pippen and Zach Lowe also joined The Jump as contributors.

=== Season 3 (2017–18) ===
For the 2017–18 NBA season, Paul Pierce joined The Jump as an analyst. Beginning on March 12, 2018, The Jump expanded from a half-hour to a full hour by moving its start to 3 pm ET.

=== Season 5 (2019–20) ===
Because of the COVID-19 pandemic, The Jump temporarily ended production between March 20, 2020, and April 12, 2020. The Jump returned as a half-hour show on April 13, 2020, in the process, becoming the first ESPN show to be produced entirely from staffers homes.

=== Cancellation ===
Following controversial comments made by Nichols about colleague Maria Taylor in front of a running video camera, Nichols was pulled from NBA coverage, including The Jump, on August 25, 2021. On the same day, it was announced that The Jump would be cancelled and replaced with a new NBA show, NBA Today. The Jump continued shows with a rotating cast of hosts until October 8, 2021.
