= NBA Today =

- Genre: NBA
- Starring: Malika Andrews; Kendrick Perkins; Chiney Ogwumike; Richard Jefferson
- Country of origin: United States
- Original language: English

Production
- Producer: Matt Sellars
- Running time: 1 hour
- Production company: ESPN

Original release
- Network: ESPN/ESPN2
- Release: October 18, 2021 – present

Related
- The Jump

NBA Today is a weekday American television studio sports talk program on ESPN, hosted by Malika Andrews, featuring Kendrick Perkins, Chiney Ogwumike and Richard Jefferson as panelists. The show rebroadcast immediately after on ESPN2, where it will air live at its regular time if ESPN is featuring another event.

NBA Today includes latest news, opinion and analysis on the National Basketball Association (NBA). The show is based in Los Angeles. NBA Today also travels to marquee NBA events, including the NBA Finals for on-site shows. NBA Today replaced The Jump as ESPN's daily NBA studio show.

== History ==
NBA Today debuted on October 18, 2021, from Los Angeles, California with a more-relaxed format that is similar to TNT's Inside the NBA.

== Personalities ==
Host

- Malika Andrews (2021–present)

Analysts

- Kendrick Perkins (2021–present)
- Chiney Ogwumike (2021–present)
- Richard Jefferson (2021–present)

Contributors

- Brian Windhorst (2021–present)
- Ramona Shelburne (2021–present)
- Scott Perry (2023–present)
- Danny Green (2024–present)
- Jeremy Lin (2026–present)

Past

- Vince Carter (2021–2023)
- Zach Lowe (2021–2024)
- Jalen Rose (2021–2023)
- Adrian Wojnarowski (2021–2024)
