= Romesh Ratnesar =

American journalist and author (born 1976)

- Born: Romesh Ratnesar; June 11, 1976 (age 50); Hayward, California, U.S.
- Notable credit(s): Time Magazine, editor (1997–2009); New America Foundation, Bernard L. Schwartz Fellow (2009–present)
- Website: http://romeshratnesar.com

Romesh Ratnesar (born June 11, 1975) is an American journalist and author. He is the Deputy Editor of Bloomberg Businessweek and former Deputy Managing Editor at TIME magazine, and is a member of the Council on Foreign Relations.

== Early life ==
As a child, Ratnesar attended The College Preparatory School in Oakland, CA. He enrolled as an undergraduate at Stanford University, and worked for the Stanford Daily, writing a biweekly column. He later received a master's degree in history from Stanford in 1997.

== Journalist ==
Immediately after graduating, Ratnesar was hired as a reporter-researcher at The New Republic, and occasionally contributed to Slate, Lingua Franca, The Washington Monthly, Mother Jones, and The Washington Post.

Ratnesar joined TIME in 1997 as a staff writer. He wrote more than 20 cover stories for the United States and international editions of the magazine, largely focusing on the 2003 Iraq War, global terrorism, the hunt for Osama bin Laden, and the ongoing Israeli-Palestinian conflict. He was named World Editor in February 2004, the youngest person in the magazine's history to hold that position. He was eventually promoted to Deputy Managing Editor, the number two position in the magazine. Ratnesar won the 2004 National Headliner Award for Magazine Reporting for TIME's 2003 "Person of the Year" story on the American soldier. He also won New York Press Club awards for feature writing in 2004 and spot news reporting in 2003.

In 2009, he published his first book, Tear Down This Wall: A City, A President, and the Speech That Ended the Cold War (Simon & Schuster). He left his managing position at TIME in 2010 to join the New America Foundation as its Bernard L. Schwartz Fellow. He still works as a contributing Editor-at-Large at TIME.

== Bibliography ==
- Tear Down This Wall : A City, a President, and the Speech that Ended the Cold War, Romesh Ratnesar, (Simon & Schuster; 2009) ISBN 1-4165-5690-7
