= Harkness table =

Discursive teaching method

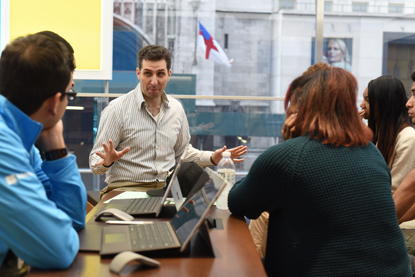
Instructor and students at Techie Youth, engaged in the Harkness discussion-based teaching method

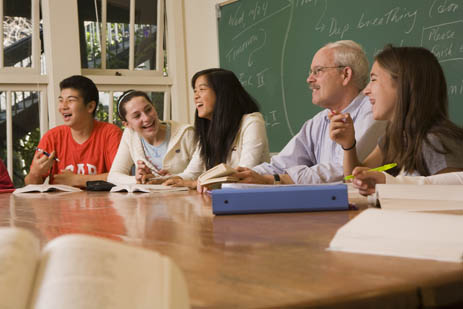
Students and instructor seated around a Harkness table at The College Preparatory School in Oakland, California

The Harkness table, Harkness method, or Harkness discussion is a teaching and learning method involving students seated in a large, oval configuration to discuss ideas in an encouraging, open-minded environment with only occasional or minimal teacher intervention.

== Overview ==
The Harkness method is in use at many American boarding schools and colleges and encourages discussion in classes. The style is related to the Socratic method. Developed at Phillips Exeter Academy, the method's name comes from the oil magnate and philanthropist Edward Harkness, who presented the school with a monetary gift in 1930. It has been adopted in numerous schools, such as The Dunham School, St. Mark's School of Texas, Germantown Academy, Milton Academy, The Lawrenceville School, The College Preparatory School, The Masters School, Ensworth School, Seoul Foreign School, The Guivy Zaldastanishvili American Academy in Tbilisi where small class-size makes it effective. However, Harkness remains impractical for schools with larger class sizes. Harkness described its use as follows:

What I have in mind is [a classroom] where [students] could sit around a table with a teacher who would talk with them and instruct them by a sort of tutorial or conference method, where [each student] would feel encouraged to speak up. This would be a real revolution in methods.

Harkness practices can vary, most notably between humanities subjects such as English and history and technical subjects such as math and physics.
