= California Gibson =

American farmer, rancher, and politician

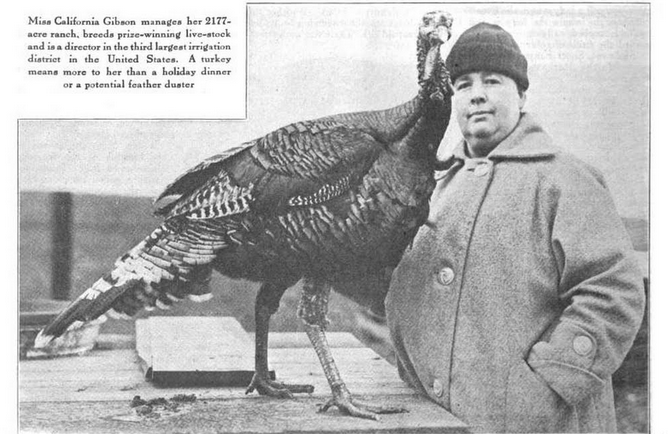
California Gibson (and a turkey), from a 1922 publication

Narcissa California Gibson (March 6, 1880 – 1958), known as California Gibson, was an American farmer, rancher, and politician, from California.

== Early life ==
Narcissa California Gibson was born in Colusa County, California, the daughter of rancher Joseph Sitton Gibson and Sarah Frances Larch Gibson. Her parents were born in Missouri; her father moved to California in 1850 as part of the California Gold Rush, but soon left mining to start a ranch. California Gibson was sent to Miss Head's School in Berkeley as a young woman, but returned to work on the ranch soon after.

== Career ==
California Gibson ran the 2177-acre J. S. Gibson Company ranch in Colusa County, with her brother Gion Gibson after their father died in 1906, and alone after her brother died in 1921. She grew rice and alfalfa, and raised prize-winning turkeys and a herd of Holstein Fresian cattle for dairy production. Beginning in 1922 she served as one of the three directors of the Glenn-Colusa Irrigation District; she was appointed by the county board of supervisors to succeed her late brother as director. "It is a position of exceptional importance, but Miss Gibson is exceptionally qualified for the responsibility," explained Sunset Magazine soon after her appointment. She sold the ranch in 1924.

In 1930 California Gibson was elected treasurer of Colusa County.
