= Shams Charania =

American sportswriter (born 1994)

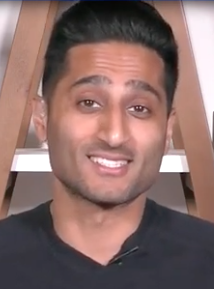
- Charania in 2023
- Born: April 1, 1994 (age 32); Chicago, Illinois, U.S.
- Education: Loyola University Chicago (BA)
- Occupation: Sports Reporter for ESPN

Shams Charania (/ˈʃɑːmz/ SHAHMZ; born April 1, 1994) is an American sports reporter for ESPN, where he covers the National Basketball Association. He previously worked for The Athletic, Stadium, and FanDuel TV.

Charania's success has been attributed to his persistent networking while sports reporting shifted away from long-form columns toward viral scoops.

== Early life ==
Charania was born on April 1, 1994, in Chicago, Illinois. His parents had immigrated to the United States from Pakistan in the 1980s. He attended New Trier High School in Winnetka, Illinois, then went to Loyola University Chicago, graduating in 2017 with a Bachelor of Arts in communications.

== Career ==
He began his sportswriting career at age 17 covering the Chicago Bulls for ChicagoNow, a subsidiary of the Chicago Tribune. In 2012, Charania began writing for RealGM, and reporting small transactions around the league. In 2015, Charania was hired by Adrian Wojnarowski to work for Yahoo Sports.

After joining Yahoo, Charania began to break news of deals and high-profile signings in the summer of 2016, including Dwight Howard's move to the Atlanta Hawks, DeMar DeRozan's re-signing with the Toronto Raptors, Luol Deng's signing with the Los Angeles Lakers, and Jamal Crawford's signing with the Los Angeles Clippers. This set off a friendly rivalry between Wojnarowski and Charania. On August 14, 2018, Shams announced he was leaving Yahoo Sports for The Athletic and Stadium at the end of the month.

Charania was a paid contributor for the sports gambling company FanDuel. His work for the company, alongside his work as a reporter, has been described by articles in SBNation and the Washington Post as a potential conflict of interest, as his reporting can shift betting odds and potentially reveal pertinent info to FanDuel. SBNation.com documented two cases where tweets by Charania giving information attributed to anonymous sources caused wild swings in the betting market, but which later turned out to be without foundation.

In 2023, Charania reported the first three picks of the 2023 NFL draft on Twitter ahead of even NFL insiders.

On October 7, 2024, Charania announced that he would be joining ESPN as the company's Senior NBA Insider. He replaced Wojnarowski, who left the role to become General Manager of the St. Bonaventure Men's Basketball program.

On February 2, 2025, Charania broke news of the Los Angeles Lakers trading Anthony Davis and Max Christie to the Dallas Mavericks for Luka Dončić in a multi-team deal; the trade was so surprising that many people, including NBA players and Charania himself, thought his phone had been hacked.

Charania has received several accolades for his contributions to sports journalism, including being named to the inaugural TIME100 Sports list in 2026, earning recognition on the Forbes 30 Under 30 list in 2021, and being named one of Chicago magazine’s 50 Most Powerful People in Chicago in 2024. He also placed first in the news category of the 2024 Blumenthal Memorial Writing Contest, having been recognized for his reporting on the Minnesota Timberwolves ownership saga.

Charania played in the 2026 NBA All-Star Celebrity Game on Team Giannis.
