= The College Preparatory School =

Private college preparatory school in Oakland, California, US

Location
- 6100 Broadway; Oakland, California 94618; United States; 37°50′54.41″N 122°14′23.89″W

Information
- School type: Private, college preparatory
- Motto: Mens Conscia Recti (A mind aware of what is right)
- Founded: 1960
- Head of School: Monique DeVane
- Faculty: 100
- Grades: 9–12
- Enrollment: 373 (2020–21)
- Student to teacher ratio: 8:1
- Language: English
- Color
- Team name: Cougars
- Newspaper: The Radar
- Annual tuition: $60050 USD
- Website: college-prep.org

The College Preparatory School (CPS or College Prep) is a four-year private non-residential high school in Oakland, California. The school's motto is Mens Conscia Recti, a Latin phrase adapted from Virgil's Aeneid that means "a mind aware of what is right".

== History ==
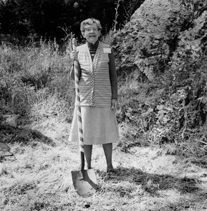
Founder Mary Harley Jenks at the Groundbreaking Ceremony for the Broadway campus, 10 May 1980

Founded in 1960, College Prep's first campus was located in a house in the Claremont neighborhood of Oakland/Berkeley. The school was founded by Mary Harley Jenks, former head of the Bentley School, and Ruth Willis. Miss Jenks, the first Head of School, envisioned a school that valued "high standards of scholarship and conduct." In 1983 College Prep moved to its current campus on Broadway.

College Prep has received accolades for its academic excellence. A 2007 Wall Street Journal article ranked College Prep as the sixth best high school in the United States. In 2010, Forbes magazine ranked College Prep as the seventeenth best private school in the United States. In 2025, niche.com ranked College Prep the eleventh best private school in the nation. For 2020, niche.com ranked College Prep the fourth best private school in the nation.

College Prep's Heads of School have been Mary Harley Jenks (1960–1969), Robert Baldwin, Jr. (1969–1990), Clint Wilkins (1990–1994), Janet Schwartz (1994–1999), Murray Cohen (1999–2011), and Monique DeVane (2011–present).

== Campus ==
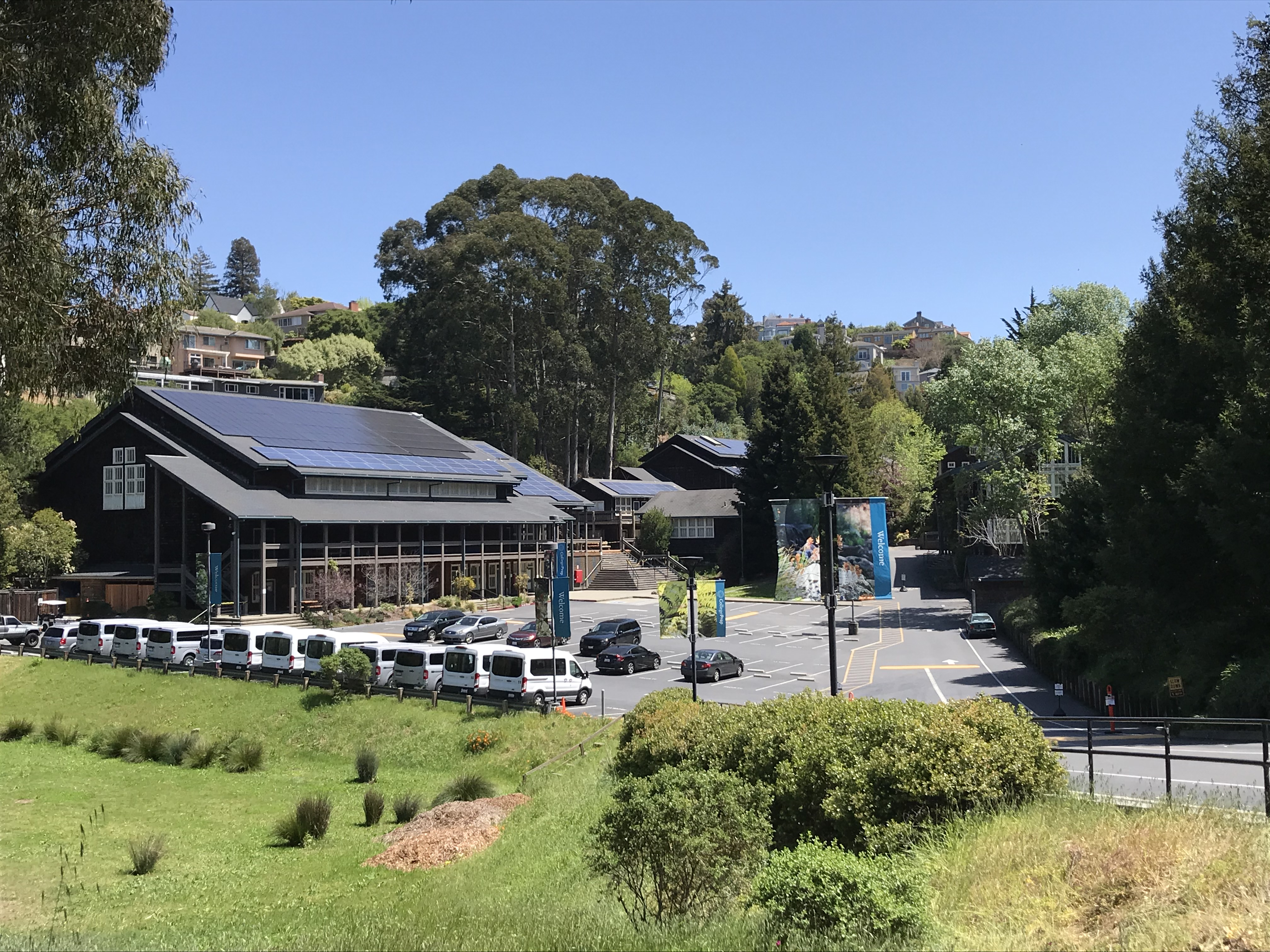
College Prep campus, April 2020

At the current campus, a large central courtyard serves as the center of daily activity to create intimacy and a sense of community between students and faculty. Major projects have been the Scott MacPherson Stapleton World Languages and Cultures Building (created and dedicated in 2011), a new campus master plan (completed in 2014), and in 2020 the school began work on the Hill Project, a new array of buildings on the upper left of campus. In addition, during the COVID-19 pandemic they leased space at a nearby training center named Seneca and began to host some classes there.

As of January 2022, the Hill Project has been completed, and the Seneca campus lease has ended.

== Curriculum ==
=== English ===
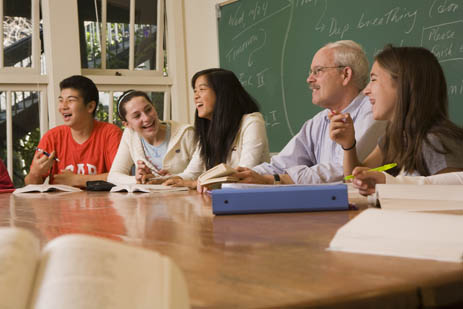
A Harkness table being used in a College Prep freshman English class

In the first two years of English at College Prep, students are sorted into classes that all read similar (or the same) books and have no specific focus. In a student's Junior and Senior years, however, they are allowed to select seminars with specific focuses (for example Poetry or Harlem Renaissance).

In order to facilitate discussion, classes are conducted at Harkness tables: oval, wooden tables popularized by philanthropist Edward Harkness. Harkness believed that the tables encouraged students to actively participate in discussion, and that they constituted a "revolution" in liberal arts education.

=== History ===
The first three years of history have a preset focus. Freshmen take Asian Worlds, where they look at the history of India and China from its founding to the modern day. Sophomores take The Atlantic World, which explores the development of the European and American history from the conclusion of the crusades through the end of the Enlightenment. Juniors take United States and the World to learn about the history of the United States as a nation, in part building off of the work the previous year in The Atlantic World. In their senior year, students can elect to take seminars similar to those in English.

=== Mathematics ===
College Prep follows an integrated curriculum that combines numerous topics and strands of mathematics throughout the year. Despite the integrated format, each section does maintain a concentration on a core mathematical field; Math 1 (algebra), Math 2 (geometry), Math 3 (trigonometry), Math 4 (applied mathematics and analysis), Math 5 (AB & BC calculus), and Math 6 (linear algebra). In addition, there are advanced classes for some levels: Math 3i, Math 4i, Math 5i. Math classes are assigned based on skill entering the school, and classes commonly span several grades. At the start of the year, freshmen take a placement exam, where they are placed into either Math I, Math II, or Math III (very rarely are they placed higher).

=== Science ===
College Prep's science program establishes a foundation in scientific principles by requiring interdisciplinary study. While most public high schools teach introductory biology courses to freshmen, College Prep follows the Physics First model of teaching basic concepts of physics to Freshmen within an integrated laboratory format. After completing courses in chemistry (Sophomores) and biology (Juniors), students often elect to take other science electives (examples include Molecular Genetics, Developmental Biology, and Physical/Organic Chemistry). Elective classes are offered in most scientific disciplines.

=== World languages ===
Latin students win first place at a California Junior Classical League Convention.

College Prep offers four-year programs in Spanish, Mandarin Chinese, and Latin. Depending on skill level, students are placed into level 1, 2, or 3 when they arrive, and after level 3 they are allowed to take seminars. Seminar levels of all world language classes are Advanced Placement preparatory. Students are required to take three years of one language or two years of two languages each.

College Prep's Latin curriculum places emphasis on ancient Roman literature and history. All Latin students take the National Latin Exam annually.

=== Honors and AP ===
Students are not distinguished between enrollment in honors and standard courses, as all classes are taught at the honors level, and are designated as such by the University of California. Students' grade point averages are calculated on an unweighted 4.0 scale. Students are required to take three years of core curricular classes and an extra year of English. Many formal AP classes are not offered but students are given extracurricular preparation if they are interested.

=== Arts ===
College Prep students are required to fulfill the University of California Visual and Performing Arts education requirement by completing two semesters of arts classes within two disciplines. The Arts department therefore offers courses in visual arts, drama, music and dance.

The Visual Arts department teaches foundation- and advanced-level classes on creative and technical skills in drawing and design.

The drama program is centered around its Acting class and conducts two major drama productions each year, and is supported by stagecraft, drama tech, and digital video production classes.

Students in the music program often perform in instrumental ensembles (such as the jazz band or the orchestra), performing both standard and "pop" repertoire. The school also has a dedicated chorus and vocal ensemble. Many students participate in the non-audition Chorus class, but advanced singers can audition for an Advanced Vocal Ensemble. Members of the A.V.E. are regularly selected to perform in the prestigious National Honor Choir organized by the American Choral Directors Association.

Dance classes are offered at all levels, and students perform in high school dance festivals, senior centers, and in theaters throughout the Bay Area. The dance program focuses on modern dance with an emphasis on African American choreographers, and teaches the techniques of Lester Horton, José Limón, Martha Graham, Katherine Dunham, and Alvin Ailey. Guest choreographers regularly visit the school to teach students. Dance is highly popular at College Prep, and the program usually has around 70 dancers at one time.

== Student life ==
=== Clubs ===
On-campus clubs usually meet weekly. Though each has a faculty advisor, they are mainly student facilitated. Clubs range from hobbies and interests (Gardening (DIRT) Club, Linguistics and Languages Club, Chess Club), to activism and social justice (Chinese Culture Club, Black Student Union, CPS Against Human Trafficking) to academia (Science Olympiad, Taiwan Club, Latin Club, Only Connect Club, Gimkit Club, Quiz Bowl, Space and Rockets Club, Computer Science Team).

=== Community service ===
College Prep students participate in service efforts as a class, wherein Sophomores and Seniors are involved in maintenance projects at Point Reyes, and Juniors cooperate with Rebuilding Together to assist in various projects around the Bay Area. Seniors are required to complete a Senior Project in which they help out the greater Oakland community in some way. Students also do outside of school community service such as cooking for men's and women's shelters in Oakland. School-wide participation in Oxfam and Amnesty International is common.

=== The Radar ===
The school has a student-run newspaper called The Radar. The Radar regularly publishes students' art and article submissions to its website and in its newsletters to the student body, which includes the regular "Humans of CPS" and "Artist of The Week" features. The Radar's website is cpsradar.com

=== Technology ===
In an attempt to combine technology and student life, the school operates three full-service computer labs and four classrooms fully equipped with laptop computers. Each faculty member is provided a laptop and each incoming student is provided an Apple MacBook Pro laptop. The program is financed by a supplementary "technology fee" to the tuition. Families may opt out of the school-purchase plan if they purchase their own equipment. When students graduate, the computers belong to them.

CPS Campus is a student created app, supporting only with iOS and macOS and enables tracking of easily customized school schedules. The app is integrated with other programs such as the Clubs Calendar.

=== Advising ===
In their first year, students are put into a CAP (compass advising program) advisory group aimed at helping ease the transition to High School. Senior mentors in CAP help freshmen facilitate their transition into high school. After that, students are put in another advisory which they stay with for the remainder of their High School experience. The second advisory groups are aimed more at helping students with any troubles they might have than a rigorous curriculum.

College Prep also offers counseling and health education programs conducted by a full-time health educator and counselor, a trained child psychologist, who provides comprehensive support to students and conducts a mandatory health program for sophomores intended to introduce them to health topics and encourage them to make healthful choices.

=== Retreats ===
The school organizes a number of special retreats for each class. Freshman retreat is conducted at the Catholic Youth Organization's campsite near Occidental, California, and is designed to help students adjust to high school. Sophomores retreat on the American River and participate in a whitewater rafting trip. Junior retreat is an exercise in leadership training and involves extensive group discussion and activities on an outdoor ropes course. Seniors discuss the transition from high school to college, providing an informal setting to say goodbye before graduation.

=== Intraterm ===
An Intraterm period takes place in the week before spring break, and consists of special courses (such as pottery or Dungeons & Dragons), field studies (examples include trips to Seattle and Washington D.C.), and internships offered to students outside of the regular curriculum. Juniors may opt out of Intraterm classes or trips in order to visit colleges. Annual participation in Intraterm is a graduation requirement.

=== College counseling ===
College Prep has an intensive and individualized counseling process for college admissions – two counselors are staffed full-time, and students begin regularly meeting with the counselors beginning in the middle of their Junior year. Individual meetings take place weekly, and students are required to attend periodic workshops regarding the admissions process.

=== Diversity ===
Data are based on the 2020-2021, 2019-2020 and 2018-2019 academic years.
Race and ethnicity	Total
Asian	44.1%
White	44.1%
Two or more Races	35.7%
Black	12.4%
Hispanic	8.4%
Native Hawaiian/Pacific Islander	2.4%
American Indian/Alaska Native	0.8%

A Dean of Equity and Belonging facilitates discussion of diversity among faculty, staff, and students. A delegation of students attend the yearly conference for People of Color in Independent Schools and stage regular events such as forums, guest speakers, and classroom discussions. The mission of the Office of Equity and Belonging is to teach bias management, cultural competency, and servant leadership. Students also lead affinity spaces on campus, including the Asian American Association (AAA), Black Student Union (BSU), Feminist Union (FemU), Gender Sexuality Alliance (GSA), Jewish Student Union (JSU), Latinos Unidos, Muslim Student Association, South Asian Alliance (SAA), and Students with Interracial Lives (SWIRL). The Student Equity Action Team is a coalition of student leaders across affinity clubs that organizes events like Community, Purpose, and Service (CPS) Day. No Place for Hate Coalition and Showing Up for Racial Justice are student organizations that focus on training bias management, allyship, and facilitation skills.

== Speech and debate ==
=== Public Forum Debate ===
In the 2020–2021 season, College Prep's public forum team earned seven bids to the national Tournament of Champions, a JV team came in second place at the Western Novice & JV National Championship, and a team went undefeated in the qualification tournament for the National Speech and Debate Tournament. In addition, at the 2021 national Tournament of Champions, a team placed 8th in the country, making it to the quarterfinal round of Gold Public Forum.

=== Competitive Speech ===
College Prep's speech team earned five bids to the national Tournament of Champions in the 2020–2021 season and sent several competitors to qualification tournaments for the Tournament of Champions, National Individual Events Tournament of Champions, Extemp Tournament of Champions, California State Championship, and National Speech and Debate Tournament. In the 2020–2021 season one competitor in Extemporaneous Speech qualified for all five championship tournaments including a double qualification to the National Speech and Debate Tournament. In past years several speech competitors made it to championship tournaments as well. In the 2021 season students placed in the semifinal round of the California State Championship, and quarterfinal rounds of national championships.

=== Policy Debate ===
College Prep has a competitive Policy Debate team, which has reached elimination rounds at numerous national tournaments, including winning the national Tournament of Champions in 2003 and reaching the final round of the National Speech and Debate Tournament in 2004 and 2012. In 2014, a novice CPS policy debate team won the Western Novice & JV National Championship. Alumni of the College Prep debate program have gone on to win the prestigious Rex Copeland Award for the top-ranked college policy debate team in the country as well as reach late elimination rounds of the National Debate Tournament.

=== Lincoln-Douglas Debate ===
College Prep's former Lincoln-Douglas debate team used to regularly compete at the Tournament of Champions, the National Speech and Debate Tournament, and the California State Championship. In 2008, a College Prep lincoln-douglas debater placed third in the California State Championship.

=== California Round Robin ===
College Prep hosts an annual round-robin policy debate tournament known as the "California Round Robin" every February, where top policy, Lincoln-Douglas, and public forum debate teams in the country are invited to participate. Rounds are held on the school campus and in conference rooms provided by the Oakland office of the Reed Smith law firm. The California Round Robin is unique from traditional tournaments in that the school invites experts on the year's resolution to judge the final rounds. Because the final round is held the night before the popular California Invitational tournament at UC Berkeley, it is usually well attended by the invitational's competitors.

=== Julia Burke Foundation ===
The debate team is supported by an endowment from the Julia Burke Foundation, and the foundation offers a scholarship to both the "Debater of the Year" at College Prep and the Julia Burke Flame for Excellence scholarship at the national policy debate Tournament of Champions.

== Athletics ==
College Prep has a variety of interscholastic teams. Because of the school's small size, and the school policy of exempting students from Physical Education classes during a semester of participation, the percentage of students who join sports teams is exceptionally high: 65% of Prep students play team sports. The school's mascot is the Cougar, and the school colors are blue, maroon, and white.

College Prep is one of ten schools in the Bay Counties League – East. The school has won twenty-one League titles since 2010, namely:

- 7 NCS Championships
- 12 NCS Second Place Finishes
- 64 League Championships
- 5 League Sportsmanship Awards (by vote of the schools in the BCL East)
- Sent 90 student-athletes on to play at the collegiate level

As a separate component of the school's modernization and expansion project, the Board also negotiated the unrestricted use of the Tom Bates Regional Sports Complex, an athletic compound adjacent to the Golden Gate Fields, for use by College Prep athletics.

== Tuition and endowment ==
Tuition for the 2025–2026 school year is $60,050. In 2025–2026, 25 percent of the student body received need-based grants.

College Prep's endowment is currently $19 million, or about $52,000 per student.

== Test scores ==
The mean SAT Reasoning Test scores for the College Prep Class of 2024 were 746 (evidence-based reading and writing) and 747 (math; on scales of 200–800). The mean ACT (test) score for the College Prep Class of 2024 was 34. Of the Class of 2022, Class of 2023, and Class of 2024, 42% received National Merit Recognition, compared to approximately 5% of students nationwide. In 2019–2020, 155 students took 349 Advanced Placement exams, with 82% of the scores being fours or fives.

== Notable alumni ==
- Alice Buckley (2011), member of the Montana House of Representatives
- Ethan Chorin (1987), Middle East and Africa-focused scholar and entrepreneur, known as a leading analyst of Libyan affairs, and for his applied development work in the Middle East and Africa.
- Isaac Chotiner, staff writer at The New Yorker
- Johanna Fateman (1992), artist and member of rock band Le Tigre
- Liz Fong-Jones (2005), site reliability engineer and developer advocate
- Kat Foster (1996), actress
- Miranda July (1992), performance artist, writer, and filmmaker
- David Marchick (1984), former Deputy Assistant Secretary of State and director of intergovernmental affairs in the Office of the United States Trade Representative under the Clinton Administration; currently Managing Director and Global Head of Regulatory Affairs of the Carlyle Group
- Yonatan Neril (1999), global sustainability advocate, founder and director of the Jerusalem-based Interfaith Center for Sustainable Development
- Chelsea Peretti (1996), actor, comedian
- Jonah Peretti (1992), founder of BuzzFeed
- Sarah Rafanelli (1990), American retired soccer forward and former member of the United States women's national soccer team
- Romesh Ratnesar (1992), World Editor and member of senior editorial staff at TIME magazine
- Justin Rosenstein (2001), former Facebook and Google software engineer, co-creator of Asana with Facebook co-founder Dustin Moskovitz
- Jennifer Rothman (1987), an American legal scholar.
- Amelia Schimmel (2004), Public Address Announcer for the Athletics, Bay FC and San Jose Barracuda
- Claire Stapleton (2003), American writer and marketer who co-organized the 2018 Google walkouts
- Chris Tashima (1978), Academy Award–winning filmmaker and actor
- Cher Wang (1977), billionaire founder of smartphone company HTC (High Tech Computer Corporation)
- Anne Washburn (1986), playwright, author of Mr. Burns, a Post-Electric Play
