= Josh Birnbaum =

American businessman

Personal details
- Education: Wharton School of the University of Pennsylvania
- Occupation: Chief Investment Officer of Tilden Park Capital Management

Josh Birnbaum is an American businessman. He is the co-founder and Chief Investment Officer of Tilden Park Capital Management and a former managing director at Goldman Sachs.

== Early life and education ==
Raised for a short time in Paris, France, Birnbaum's family moved to Oakland, California, where he attended Head-Royce School private school, graduating in 1990. After high school, Birnbaum attended the Wharton School of the University of Pennsylvania, where he earned a degree in finance.

== Career ==
Birnbaum interned for Goldman Sachs in the summer of 1992 as a collateral mortgage obligations analyst. After graduating Wharton he remained with the firm, eventually leading Goldman's structured products group.

In 2007, Birnbaum had reportedly generated $3.7 billion for the bank by short-selling the subprime mortgage market, for which he was given a bonus of $10 million. In 2010, Birnbaum testified before the U.S. Senate Permanent Subcommittee on Investigations regarding the firm’s role in the subprime mortgage crisis.

After 14 years of working for Goldman, Birnbaum left in 2008 to form Tilden Park Capital Management, named after Tilden Regional Park near where he had grown up in Oakland, California. Co-founded with former Goldman colleague Jeremy Primer and fellow University of Pennsylvania alum Sam Alcoff, the firm started investing in February 2010 with a $25 million (~$35 million in 2024) managed account.
