= Alison Starling =

American journalist

Alison Starling-Alexander
- Born: October 28, 1973 (age 52)
- Education: University of Florida
- Occupations: News anchor and journalist
- Years active: 1995–2023
- Employer: WJLA-TV (August 2003 – November 22, 2023)
- Spouse: Peter Alexander (2012–present)
- Children: 2
- Parent(s): Bruce and Dolores Starling

Alison Starling-Alexander (born October 28, 1973) is an American former television news anchor and journalist. She was a co-anchor of WJLA-TV's weekday 4 PM and 5PM newscasts, and an anchor semi-regularly on the noon newscast. She stepped down from the station on November 22, 2023, citing a desire to spend more time with her family.

== Early life ==
Starling is from Orlando, Florida. She is from a military family and spent part of her childhood in the Washington D.C. metropolitan area while her father worked for the Office of the United States Trade Representative. She later returned to DC to be a congressional intern. Per a DNA test she and her husband took, she is of mostly British and Irish descent. Starling graduated from University of Florida in 1995. She then earned a Cultural Ambassadorial Scholarship from Rotary International to study in Tours, France for six months in 1995.

== Career ==
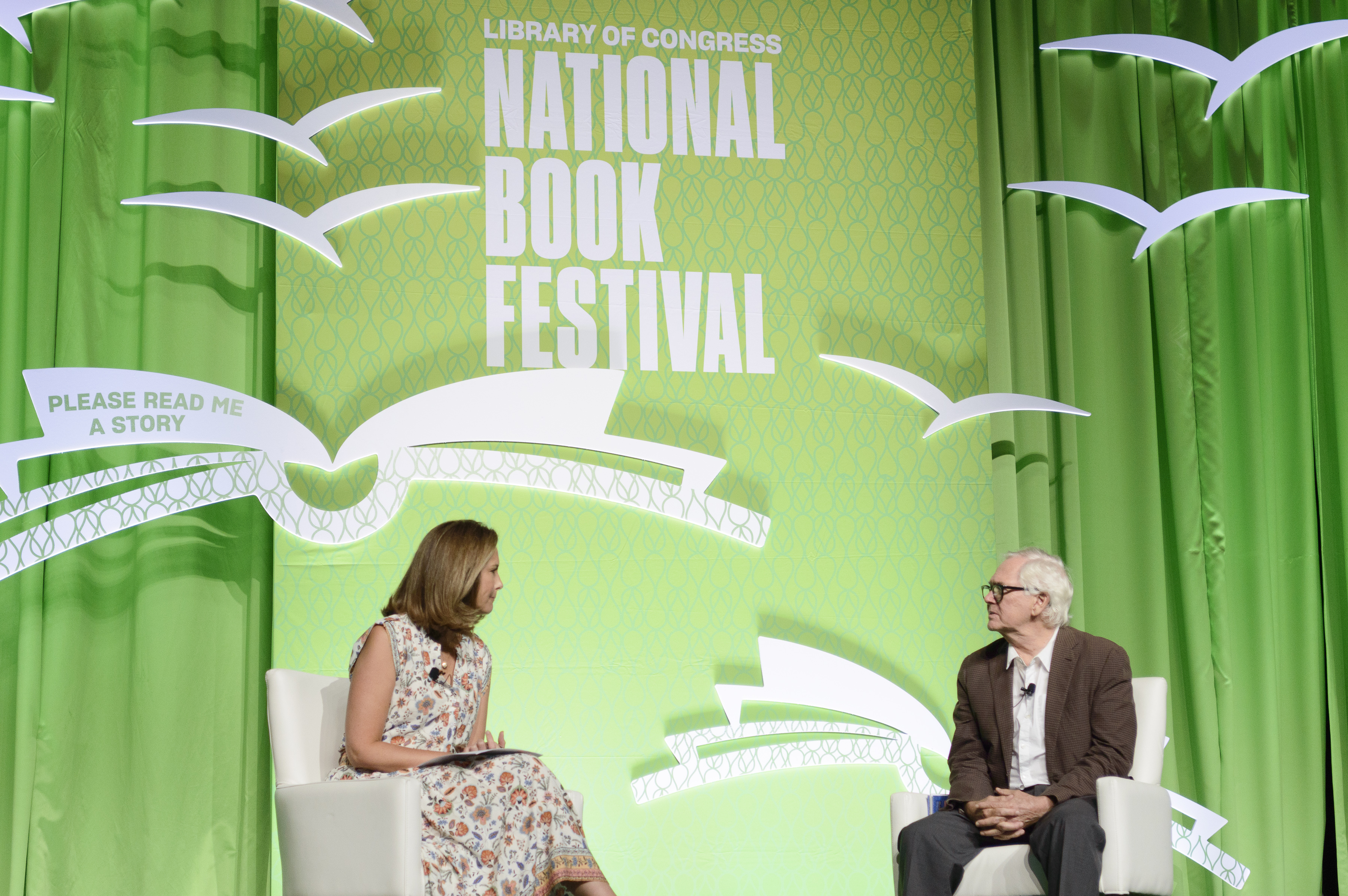
Starling interviews children's author Marc Brown at the National Book Festival in 2022

=== Early career ===
Starling career began at WDEF-TV in Chattanooga, Tennessee, as a reporter and anchor. She then worked for three years at KIRO-TV in Seattle, Washington, where she covered the Seattle earthquake.

=== WJLA-TV ===
Starling joined WJLA-TV in August 2003. One year later, she became co-anchor of Good Morning Washington (5-7AM) and ABC7 News at Noon. In 2005, Washingtonian named her one of the area's rising stars in local television news. On November 3, 2023, Starling announced that she would be stepping down from the station to focus more on spending time with her family. Her final newscast aired on November 22, 2023, the day before Thanksgiving.

== Personal ==
Starling met NBC News correspondent Peter Alexander in 2001. In August 2011 they became engaged in France. They married Saturday April 21, 2012, atop the Newseum in Washington, D.C.

In February 2013, she announced her pregnancy, and shared that she was having a girl.

On December 11, 2014, The Washington Post noted that Starling was expecting the couple's second child. The couple is raising their children Jewish.
