= Peter Alexander (journalist) =

American journalist (born 1976)

- Alexander in 2016
- Born: Peter Marvin Alexander; July 29, 1976 (age 50); Oakland, California, U.S.
- Education: Head-Royce School; Northwestern University
- Occupations: Journalist; television presenter
- Employers: NBC News (2004–2026); MS NOW (2026–present)
- Known for: NBC News White House correspondent (2012–2026); Saturday Today co-anchor (2018–2026)
- Spouse: Alison Starling (m. 2012)
- Children: 2
- Relatives: Rebecca Alexander (sister)

Peter Marvin Alexander (born July 29, 1976) is an American journalist and television presenter who works for MS NOW. He previously worked at NBC News as White House correspondent covering the White House and the President of the United States from December 2012 to March 2026.

In October 2018, he was named co-anchor of Today for Saturday editions. His reports appeared across all platforms of NBC News, including NBC Nightly News, Today, Meet the Press, NBC News Now, Dateline NBC, and NBCNews.com. He shared duties alongside Kristen Welker as the network's co-chief White House correspondent starting in January 2021. After Welker became the moderator of Meet the Press, Alexander became the sole chief White House correspondent for NBC News (and MSNBC until it became part of separate company Versant in November 2025).

== Biography ==
=== Personal life ===
Alexander was born to a Jewish family in Oakland, California, the son of Terry (née Pink) and David Alexander, an attorney. Alexander's parents are divorced. He has a younger sister, psychotherapist Rebecca Alexander, who has Usher syndrome type III. She is a psychotherapist living in New York City.

Alexander graduated from Northwestern University in Evanston, Illinois with a Bachelor's degree in journalism in 1998.

On April 21, 2012, Alexander married Alison Starling, who was an anchor at WJLA-TV (Washington, D.C.'s ABC affiliate). The couple has two children and lives in the suburbs of Washington D.C.

=== Early career ===
From 1997 to 2004, Alexander built his career at various local stations, notably WKYT in Lexington, Kentucky; KHQ-TV in Spokane, Washington (1998–2000), and finally as an anchor and reporter at KCPQ in Seattle.

=== NBC News ===
In 2004, Alexander moved to NBC News, where he has focused on international stories, such as the 2005 Iraq elections, the death of Osama bin Laden in Pakistan, and the tsunami in Indonesia. He has filed reports from Afghanistan, the Galápagos Islands, Gaza Strip, Israel, Laos, and Mexico.

Alexander's work includes environmental reporting from the Northwest Passage in the Arctic, and reports on the story of his sister, Rebecca, who has type III Usher Syndrome, a rare genetic disorder diminishing her vision and hearing.

Alexander covered numerous breaking news events, including anchoring live coverage of the "Miracle on the Hudson" and the Virginia Tech shooting.

In 2006, Alexander was nominated for the "Outstanding Live Coverage of a Breaking News Story – Long Form" News & Documentary Emmy Award for his work on the NBC News Special Report: The Death of Pope John Paul II (2005) news documentary. In 2010, he reported on the international controversy surrounding WikiLeaks and its founder Julian Assange. In addition to his news responsibilities, Alexander has hosted NBC Sports and covered the 2008 Beijing Olympic Games, 2010 Winter Olympics, 2016 Summer Olympics, and 2026 Winter Olympics.

==== White House correspondent ====
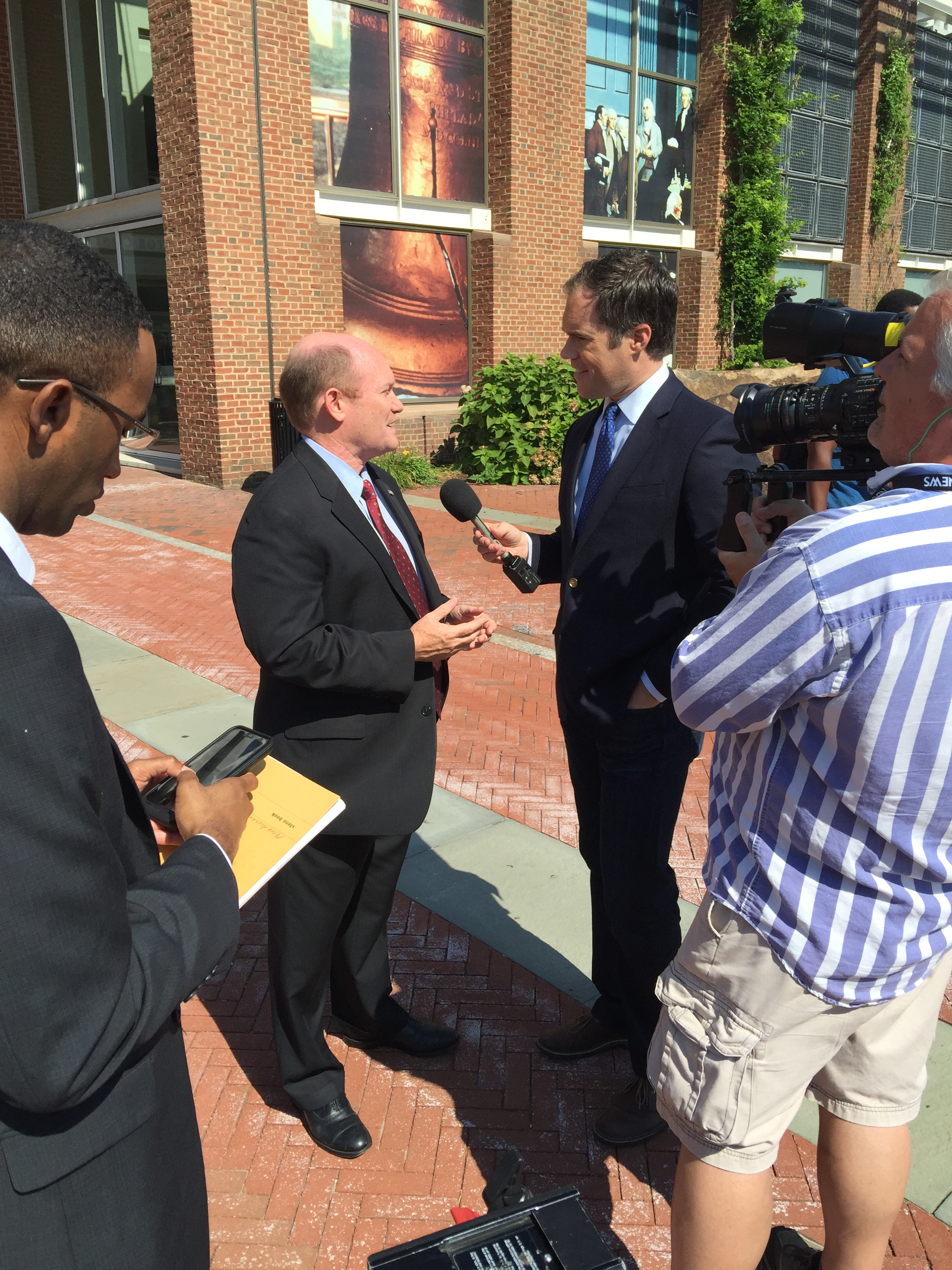
Alexander interviewing Senator Chris Coons (2016).

From 2012 to March 2014, Alexander served as a White House correspondent. He covered the Presidency of Barack Obama, traveling across the world. Alexander was a national correspondent from 2014 to 2016, based in Washington, D.C. frequently reporting from the White House. In January 2017, Alexander was named White House correspondent for NBC News, then co-Chief White House correspondent in January 2021. Alexander became Chief White House correspondent in the summer 2023.

==== Weekend Today ====
Alexander became co-anchor of the Saturday edition of Today in October 2018, replacing Craig Melvin, who left his role as co-host of the Saturday morning version of Today to join the weekday edition as its news anchor. Alexander continued his role as a White House correspondent while anchoring Today on Saturdays. Additionally, he often filled in across the first three hours of Today during the week. On March 28, 2026, he announced that he was departing to spend more time with his family.

=== MS NOW ===
Following his exit from NBC News, it was reported that Alexander was in talks to join MS NOW (formerly MSNBC and a sister network to NBC News prior to its spin-off from NBCUniversal), and to anchor its 11 a.m. hour on weekdays. On March 30, 2026, it was confirmed that Alexander would join the network as breaking news anchor and chief national reporter, in addition to hosting a new 11 a.m. hour. His new show was later announced as State of Play with Peter Alexander, which premiered on August 10, 2026.

== Notable media moments ==
=== 2020 Trump exchange ===
On March 20, 2020, Alexander attended a live White House briefing held on steps the federal and state governments were undertaking to respond to the COVID-19 pandemic in the United States. President Donald Trump stated he had a "good feeling" and was "hopeful" about the potential effectiveness against coronavirus of certain older drug therapies such as chloroquine that have been effective on other conditions. Alexander asked:

"Is it possible that your impulse to put a positive spin on things may be giving Americans a false sense of hope?"

President Trump answered that it was important to communicate hopeful therapies that are being investigated. Alexander further questioned the president:

"What do you say to Americans who are scared, though? I guess, nearly 200 dead, 14,000 who are sick, millions, as you witnessed, who are scared right now. What do you say to Americans who are watching you right now who are scared?"

Trump replied:

"I say that you are a terrible reporter, that's what I say. I think it's a very nasty question. I think it's a very bad signal that you are putting out to the American people. They're looking for answers and they're looking for hope. And you're doing sensationalism."

=== 2025 Trump Exchange ===
Alexander asks a question to Trump during the 2025 Trump–Ramaphosa Oval Office meeting (May 2025).

Alexander questioned President Trump on May 21st, 2025 about accepting a gifted aircraft from the Qatari royal family, while Trump was hosting South African President Cyril Ramaphosa. Trump replied that Alexander was not addressing the genocide of white South African farmers.

== See also ==
- List of American journalists
- List of television reporters
