= Adrian Wojnarowski =

American sportswriter (born 1969)

- Born: March 4, 1969 (age 57); Bristol, Connecticut, U.S.
- Education: St. Bonaventure University
- Occupations: Sports reporter, columnist
- Years active: 1986–2024
- Awards: NSMA National Sportswriter of the Year (2017, 2018, 2019)
- Coaching career

Current position
- Title: General manager
- Team: St. Bonaventure
- Conference: A-10

Administrative career (AD unless noted)
- 2024–present: St. Bonaventure (GM)

Adrian Wojnarowski (/wɜːrdʒˈnaʊski/ wurj-NOW-skee; born March 4, 1969), nicknamed Woj (/woʊdʒ/ WOHJ), is an American basketball executive and former sports columnist and reporter. During his years as an NBA insider for ESPN and Yahoo! Sports, he became one of the NBA's preeminent reporters. Wojnarowski is largely credited with ushering in an era of Twitter-driven, breaking news-focused NBA reporting, in which top reporters are NBA celebrities in their own right. He retired from reporting in 2024 and is currently the general manager of the St. Bonaventure Bonnies men's basketball team.

== Personal life ==
Wojnarowski was born in Bristol, Connecticut, on March 4, 1969. His parents were Polish immigrants. He graduated from Bristol Central High School in 1987 and from St. Bonaventure University in Allegany, New York, in 1991. He was named St. Bonaventure's alumnus of the year in 2019, and received an honorary doctorate from the university in 2022.

Wojnarowski currently lives in Glen Rock, New Jersey with his wife, Amy, and their two children, Ben and Annie. He met Amy, who graduated from St. Bonaventure in 1992, through the college newspaper.

In December 2024, Wojnarowski revealed that he was diagnosed with prostate cancer in March of the same year.

== Journalism career ==
Wojnarowski began his career working for the Hartford Courant starting as a high school senior and continuing during college holidays. During his time in college, he interned at the Olean Times Herald in 1989, where the sports department put him to use writing highly critical pieces of St. Bonaventure's basketball team. After graduating from college, he wrote for some smaller papers before becoming a columnist for the Fresno Bee in 1995.

In 1997, he began to work for The Record in New Jersey. As a result of his work with The Record, he was named "Columnist of the Year" in 1997 and in 2002 by the Associated Press Sports Editors. During that time, he also contributed regularly to ESPN.com. In 2006, he published a New York Times best-seller: The Miracle of St. Anthony: A Season with Coach Bob Hurley and Basketball's Most Improbable Dynasty. On June 20, 2019, Wojnarowski was awarded the inaugural Tony Kubek Award for Media Excellence by the National Polish-American Sports Hall of Fame in Michigan.

=== Yahoo! Sports ===
In 2007, Wojnarowski left The Record and joined Yahoo! Sports full-time. In March 2009, he and Dan Wetzel wrote a story tying the Connecticut Huskies men's basketball program to several recruiting violations. In 2010 the New York Post reported that Wojnarowski was being sued by the Penguin Group for failing to meet a deadline for a book covering the life of coach Jim Valvano. Wojnarowski responded that the problem was "a miscommunication between my agent and me" and said that he would be returning the money to Penguin Books.

Over time, Wojnarowski shifted his emphasis from opinions columns to breaking news. He was widely considered one of the best NBA "scoopers"—that is, he was frequently the first to report NBA signings, trades, and draft picks, which gave him a large advantage in the fast-moving social media space where "algorithms often prioritize being first, ... gain[ing] him tens of thousands of extra clicks." He was so well-connected that on at least one occasion, a team executive said that his staff learned of a new signing from Wojnarowski before he had even announced it to the team. His speed made him an Internet celebrity, and his scoops were referred to as "Woj Bombs"; his Twitter followers would sometimes respond to his breaking news tweets with "nuclear explosion" gifs for comedic effect. Wojnarowski flexed his reporting muscle by repeatedly reporting NBA draft picks before the league announced them on its annual live telecast, which he continued to do (in a more comedic form) after joining NBA broadcasting partner ESPN.

However, Wojnarowski was accused of access journalism, providing favorable coverage to sources like Detroit Pistons general manager Joe Dumars in exchange for scoops. He reportedly attempted to pressure LeBron James to leak news to him by writing negative columns; his reporting on James received some criticism for being biased and poorly sourced. He was listed No. 1 in Sports Media Watch's Worst of Sports Media 2010 as a result of this criticism.

Despite being from Bristol, Connecticut, where ESPN is headquartered, and working for ESPN during his early career, Wojnarowski developed a strong rivalry with ESPN and many of its established NBA reporters, including Marc Stein and John Hollinger. Wojnarowski, who ran a lean operation at Yahoo!, reportedly resented ESPN's large staff and ample resources. Ric Bucher said that Wojnarowski had "a jihad against ESPN." ESPN laid off several NBA reporters, including Stein, shortly before Wojnarowski joined ESPN in 2017. One of the laid-off reporters, Ethan Strauss, started a Substack account that periodically published pieces highly critical of Wojnarowski.

=== ESPN ===
Wojnarowski left Yahoo! Sports for ESPN on July 1, 2017, just before the start of NBA free agency that year, making his ESPN debut on the midnight edition of SportsCenter. ESPN president John Skipper boasted that he hired Wojnarowski because "We wanted to be first [in breaking news], and we wanted to win." During his years at ESPN, Wojnarowski mentored upcoming reporter Malika Andrews.

While at ESPN, Wojnarowski continued to break news at a rapid rate. He won three consecutive National Sportswriter of the Year awards from the National Sports Media Association, in 2017, 2018, and 2019. He was the first to announce that the NBA had suspended the 2020 season due to the COVID-19 pandemic. He was such a celebrity that during the 2024 presidential election campaign, Kamala Harris' staff reportedly asked him to break the news of Tim Walz's selection as Harris' running mate, although another outlet broke the news first. In addition, Wojnarowski and his ESPN colleague Adam Schefter participated in commercials for T-Mobile and Samsung.

Wojnarowski announced his retirement from the news industry in September 2024 after being diagnosed with early-stage prostate cancer that March, although he stressed that as of December 2024, his long-term prognosis remained good. Shams Charania succeeded him at ESPN. Following his retirement, the Basketball Hall of Fame awarded Wojnarowski its Curt Gowdy Media Award.

==== Rivalry with Shams Charania ====
During his time at Yahoo! Sports, Wojnarowski mentored a young Shams Charania, who later became Wojnarowski's chief rival for scoops after Wojnarowski left Yahoo! for ESPN. Reeves Wiedeman wrote that "Charania and Wojnarowski have become celebrities in their own right [] by serving as vessels for the daily stream of news that holds NBA fans' attention even (and perhaps especially) when there aren't any games being played." Frank Isola said that the Woj-Shams rivalry was "the only real rivalry left in the NBA." However, the rivalry's focus on breaking news received criticism from some other reporters, including Isaac Chotiner, who quipped that "If Shams didn’t write [favorable stories to] get in good with his sources, he couldn't do the vital work of breaking news 43 seconds before everyone else." (This was not an exaggeration: in 2021, Wojnarowski beat Charania to a key scoop, James Harden's trade to the Brooklyn Nets, by eight seconds.)

Beyond merely reporting news, Wojnarowski and Charania's knowledge allowed them to help shape events in the NBA. According to Wiedeman, "Wojnarowski has a grip on many of the NBA's front offices, while Charania has more of a foothold among agents and even many players." Certain agents said that Wojnarowski's knowledge of the NBA was so vast that agents and teams privately consulted with him before making decisions. In addition, the Washington Post reported that NBA front offices revised their information-sharing practices to limit leaks to Wojnarowski and Charania. However, it was also said that NBA executives strategically leaked information to Wojnarowski and Charania to skirt the league's anti-tampering rules, which prevent teams from recruiting other teams' players before the start of free agency.

==== Josh Hawley incident ====
On July 10, 2020, Republican Senator Josh Hawley wrote a letter to NBA commissioner Adam Silver questioning the propriety of the NBA allowing social justice statements on players' jerseys, but not support for law enforcement or anything critical of the Chinese Communist Party. The NBA has business connections with China. Wojnarowski, copied on the Hawley communication, replied to Hawley via email saying "fuck you". Wojnarowski apologized the same day to Hawley and ESPN; ESPN called Wojnarowski's response "completely unacceptable behavior" and suspended Wojnarowski without pay for two weeks. Wojnarowski's outburst impressed even his critics, such as LeBron James, who tweeted "#FreeWOJ!!" following the suspension.

== Basketball executive career ==
On September 19, 2024, Wojnarowski announced that he would become the general manager of the men's basketball team at St. Bonaventure University, his alma mater. In doing so, he exchanged the remaining three years and $20 million on his ESPN contract for a $75,000 salary. In an interview with The New York Times, Wojnarowski argued that fielding a competitive basketball team was critical to the long-term success of the university as an academic institution, explaining that "without Bonaventure being competitive in the Atlantic 10 [Conference] ... it puts the entire institution at some level of peril."

The St. Bonaventure Bonnies compiled a 22–12 record during Wojnarowski's first year. However, they dropped to 17–17 in the 2025–2026 season. The Athletic reported that during this time, Wojnarowski's relationship with head coach Mark Schmidt had begun deteriorating over multiple areas, including differences over player recruitment. Wojnarowski also wanted to financially restructure the program, reducing the team's head coaching salary to increase player wages. In March 2025, St. Bonaventure announced that Schmidt would retire at the end of the season. However, according to the Olean Star, Wojnarowski and athletic director Robert Beretta made the decision to dismiss Schmidt from his position; Beretta called this "misinformation", acknowledging that there was a "misalignment" between Wojnarowski and Schmidt. The same month, the university announced their hiring of Mike MacDonald, formerly of the Daemen Wildcats, as their new head coach.

== Publications ==
- Wojnarowski, Adrian (2006). The Miracle of St. Anthony: A Season with Coach Bob Hurley and Basketball's Most Improbable Dynasty. Gotham Books. ISBN 1-59240-186-4.

== See also ==
- Shams–Woj rivalry
