= Rebecca Alexander =

American Deafblind psychotherapist, author and advocate

- Born: Rebecca Ann Alexander; February 4, 1979 (age 47); Berkeley, California, U.S.
- Education: University of Michigan (BA); Columbia University (MSW, MPH)
- Occupations: Psychotherapist, author, group fitness instructor, disability rights advocate
- Known for: Not Fade Away: A Memoir of Senses Lost and Found
- Relatives: Peter Alexander (brother)
- Website: www.rebalexander.com

Rebecca Ann Alexander (born February 4, 1979) is an American psychotherapist and author. Deafblind due to Usher syndrome, Alexander wrote a memoir in 2014 about coming to terms with her deteriorating sight as well as her feats as an extreme athlete, such as climbing to the summit of Mount Kilimanjaro. In 2016, she received a Helen Keller Achievement Award from the American Foundation for the Blind.

== Early life and education ==
Rebecca Ann Alexander was born into a Jewish family on February 4, 1979, in Oakland, California, to mother Terry Pink Alexander and father David Alexander, an attorney. She has two siblings; a twin brother, Kevin, and older brother Peter Alexander, a journalist and White House correspondent for NBC News.

Alexander was diagnosed with vision loss at age twelve, originally diagnosed as retinitis pigmentosa. While in school she played soccer and participated in the Maccabiah Games, as well as attending Temple Sinai in Oakland. At age eighteen, a fall from a second-story window resulted in months of physical rehabilitation and delayed her start to college. When she began college, she began experiencing tinnitus, and received a diagnosis of Usher syndrome type III at age twenty.

Alexander earned an undergraduate degree from the University of Michigan and double master's degrees from Columbia University in social work and public health.

== Life and honors ==
Alexander's memoir, Not Fade Away: A Memoir of Senses Lost and Found, was cowritten with Sascha Alper and published in 2014. Alexander appeared on Today, Morning Joe, and other shows to promote her book. In 2019, Not Fade Away was reported to be in the process of being made into a movie screenwritten by Lindsey Ferrentino, produced by John Krasinski and David O. Russell, and starring Emily Blunt.

A book review in The New York Times described how Alexander "pushes herself to grueling physical feats," participating in marathons and week-long charity bike rides. Her travels have included climbing the Inca Trail to Machu Picchu, swimming the frigid 1.5 miles of ocean water between Alcatraz Island to San Francisco's Aquatic Park, and summiting Mount Kilimanjaro. She also teaches spinning and high-intensity training at a New York City gym.

Alexander was one of the performers in the traveling production "Silent No More," created by Ali Stroker in 2019 to highlight the stories of deaf and hard of hearing people.

She has received several awards, including the Helen Keller Achievement Award in 2016 from the American Foundation for the Blind, the Eagle Award in 2017 from Disability Rights Advocates, the Spirit of Leadership award from NO LIMITS for deaf children in 2017, and Bicentennial Alumni Award in 2017 from the University of Michigan. In 2018 she threw a ceremonial first pitch at a Boston Red Sox game to raise awareness of Usher syndrome.
