= Rachel Nichols (journalist) =

American sports journalist

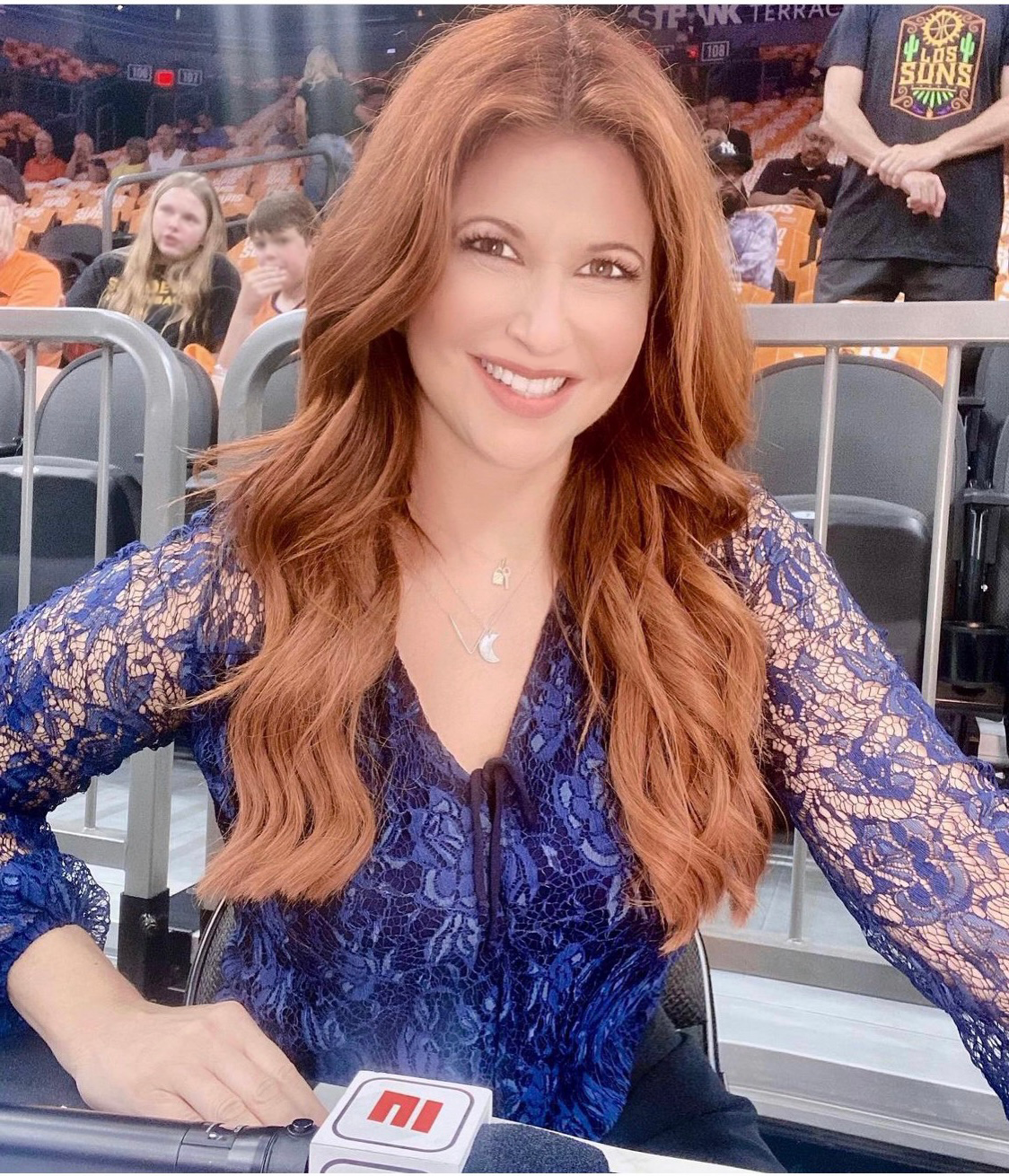
- Nichols in 2021
- Born: Rachel Michele Alexander; October 18, 1973 (age 53); Potomac, Maryland, U.S.
- Education: Northwestern University
- Occupations: Sports journalist, television host
- Years active: 1995–present
- Notable credit(s): NBA on TNT; Unguarded with Rachel Nichols; SportsCenter; Monday Night Football; Monday Night Countdown; Sunday NFL Countdown; E:60; The Jump
- Spouse: Max Nichols (m. 2001)
- Children: 2
- Relatives: Mike Nichols (father-in-law); Annabel Davis-Goff (mother-in-law)

Rachel Michele Nichols (née Alexander; born October 18, 1973) is an American journalist and sportscaster. She is most notable for her work with the National Basketball Association (NBA), and has also covered the National Football League (NFL), National Hockey League (NHL), Major League Baseball (MLB), professional tennis, college sports, and the Olympics. In 2014, Sports Illustrated called Nichols "the country's most impactful and prominent female sports journalist".

== Early life ==
Rachel Michele Alexander was born to Jane and Ronald Jacobs. Growing up in Potomac, Maryland, she became a fan of sports during her youth, saying it felt like watching a live storybook movie with heroes and villains, and an ending not yet written. Nichols wrote for and edited the school newspaper at Winston Churchill High School, graduating in 1991.

While attending the Medill School of Journalism at Northwestern University, she had summer internships at USA Today, Chicago Sun-Times and The Washington Post. Michael Wilbon, a lead sports columnist of The Washington Post at the time, met Nichols when she was an 18-year-old intern and said "she had supreme confidence." One of Nichols' earliest assignments was to attend Chicago Bulls practices as a freelance newspaper reporter amid the team's first three-peat. After a few media sessions where she took notes and did not ask questions, Michael Jordan called her out to speak. The two began to talk on a regular basis after the exchange and Nichols credited the experience in growing her skills as a journalist. At age 21, she received a bachelor's degree from Northwestern University.

== Career ==
=== Newspapers ===
Nichols' first job was as a sportswriter for the Fort Lauderdale Sun-Sentinel covering the University of Miami football team and Miami Dolphins. In 1996, Nichols joined The Washington Post to cover the NHL's Washington Capitals. She later branched out into other sports including professional tennis, the Olympics, the National Basketball Association and Major League Baseball. Nichols covered Pete Sampras, Andre Agassi as well as Venus and Serena Williams early in their careers.

=== Television ===
==== ESPN ====
She transitioned to broadcasting in 2004 when ESPN hired her as a reporter. Nichols made regular appearances on SportsCenter, Sunday NFL Countdown, Monday Night Countdown and was a recurring sideline reporter for Monday Night Football and NBA broadcasts. She was also a correspondent for E:60 and became a recognizable face at the network due to her rapport with prominent sports figures, with Esquire naming Nichols one of the "Women We Love".

==== CNN ====
In January 2013, Nichols left ESPN for CNN/Turner Sports and was announced to anchor the network's first sports-related program in twelve years. She was called a "revered player in the space" and considered a 'big get' for CNN. Unguarded with Rachel Nichols premiered in October of that year and changed from a regular series to an occasional special by October 2014. During this period, Nichols also worked the sidelines for the NBA on TNT program in both regular season and playoff games as well as regular appearances on Inside the NBA. She was a sideline reporter for CBS and TBS during the NCAA men's basketball tournament, paired with Verne Lundquist and Bill Rafferty, and was a dugout reporter for TBS during MLB playoff games. Nichols was widely praised for her tough questioning of NFL Commissioner Roger Goodell in the wake of the Ray Rice scandal and likewise for confronting boxer Floyd Mayweather on his history of domestic violence. The Hollywood Reporter recognized her as one of the "10 Most Powerful Voices in Sports Media".

==== Return to ESPN ====
In 2016, Nichols was recruited back to ESPN by then-president John Skipper. She pitched "a conversation about basketball" as a daily program where former players, reporters and associates of the NBA community discuss the league. Tracy McGrady joined The Jump when it debuted in February 2016. A sit-down interview with Nichols became a benchmark for active players, and Sports Illustrated called The Jump "TV's smartest basketball show". She also became a frequent guest on the podcast Pardon My Take (2016–present), as well as on the TV show Pardon the Interruption. During the following years, Nichols interviewed Meek Mill and Philadelphia 76ers co-owner Michael Rubin on criminal justice reform, Mark Cuban after an NBA investigation into workplace harassment within the Dallas Mavericks organization and Kobe Bryant in one of his final interviews. She was nominated for "Outstanding Sports Personality/Studio Host" in the 2021 Sports Emmy Awards.

Plans to have The Jump serve as the Finals pregame show were scrapped amid the COVID-19 pandemic, when NBA Countdown with host Maria Taylor was made the Finals' pregame and halftime show. During the 2020 NBA Bubble, an employee at ESPN's Connecticut headquarters used a cell phone to record Nichols in her hotel room without her knowledge. The recording included a phone call with LeBron James' advisor Adam Mendelsohn, which was reportedly 30 minutes long, taken from a continuous video feed connected to ESPN's servers. The employee texted the recording to ESPN employees and executives, as well as Deadspin. Deadspin declined to publish the video, citing that it was an attempt to discredit Nichols and the employee may have committed a crime. An ESPN spokesperson acknowledged the issue in a comment to Deadspin, "We are extremely disappointed about the leak of a private conversation. It's indefensible and an intrusion on Rachel's privacy." Nichols was the sideline reporter for the 2020 NBA Finals and hosted its championship trophy presentation.

One year later, four minutes of edited footage from the phone call leaked to The New York Times before the 2021 NBA Finals amid ESPN's contract negotiations with Taylor. The footage included Nichols noting that being NBA Countdown host for the 2020 Finals "is in my contract in writing" and had been announced via press release by ESPN. She also alleged that internal pressure from a New York Times investigation into racism at ESPN and the network's "crappy record on diversity" — and pressure to give Taylor, who is Black, more "things to do" — led to executives asking her to step aside for Taylor. In response to the article, ESPN removed Nichols from sideline reporting for the 2021 Finals and skipped airing The Jump for a day before she returned and issued an on-air apology to Taylor.

Nearly seven weeks after the NBA Finals, ESPN canceled The Jump and removed Nichols from its programming. At the time, she had over a year remaining on her contract. As Connecticut and Florida are two-party consent states for lawful recording of phone calls and conversations, Nichols was reported to have a strong legal case against ESPN. In January 2022, Nichols settled with ESPN and left the network.

==== Showtime ====
In September 2022, Nichols joined Showtime Sports to contribute to their basketball coverage. Headliners with Rachel Nichols, a weekly interview series, premiered on Showtime on April 13, 2023. The show aired on linear television and as part of Showtime's streaming service. Guests included Joel Embiid, Stephen Curry, Dwyane Wade and Jason Kidd, Luka Dončić and Kyrie Irving, Steve Kerr, Dirk Nowitzki and Allen Iverson. Wade's comments on the program about moving his family out of Florida drew national coverage.

==== Fox Sports ====
In August 2023, it was announced that Nichols joined Fox Sports as one of the panelists for the weekday morning debate show Undisputed with Skip Bayless, Keyshawn Johnson, Michael Irvin and Richard Sherman. Undisputed ended in August 2024. Nichols has since continued at Fox Sports as a host and analyst.

Monumental Sports - Hometown

, Nichols works for her home town Hockey and Basketball organizations, the Capitals, Wizards, and Mystics as a reporter on the Monumental Sports Entertainment Network. Her show is called Hometown.

== Personal life ==
Nichols married film and music video director Max Nichols, son of film and stage director Mike Nichols, in a Jewish ceremony in Venice in 2001. Her stepmother-in-law, the stepmother of Max Nichols and the last wife of Mike Nichols before his death, is Diane Sawyer. The couple have twin daughters (born March 2011). She also has one older brother and one younger brother.
