= Edward Kosner =

American journalist

- Born: 1937 (age 88–89)
- Occupation: Journalist
- Spouses: Alice Nadel (m. 1959; div. 1977); Julie Baumgold (m. 1978)
- Children: 2, including John Kosner

Edward Kosner (born 1937) is an American journalist and author who served as the top editor of Newsweek, New York and Esquire magazines and the New York Daily News. He is the author of a memoir, It's News to Me, published in 2006, and is a frequent book reviewer for The Wall Street Journal.

== Early life ==
Kosner grew up in the Washington Heights neighborhood of Manhattan, New York City. He was the editor of his elementary and junior high school newspapers. At 16, he enrolled at City College of New York (CCNY), where he was editor-in-chief of the undergraduate newspaper, the Campus, and the CCNY correspondent for The New York Times.

== Journalism career ==
On graduation from CCNY in 1958, Kosner joined the New York Post, then a liberal tabloid owned by Dorothy Schiff. He spent five years at the paper, working on night rewrite, as a series writer, and as an assistant city editor.

In 1963, he was hired by Newsweek as a writer in the National Affairs section. His first cover story was on Jacqueline Kennedy's new life after the assassination of her husband. Over the next fifteen years, Kosner wrote more than a score of cover stories, started a section on urban problems, and held all the top editorial positions on the magazine under Osborn Elliott. He directed the magazine's extensive coverage of the Watergate scandal.

In 1975, at 37, he was named editor of Newsweek. During his editorship, the magazine set records for advertising and circulation. But he was dismissed by the magazine's owner, Katharine Graham in 1979, one of five editors of Newsweek Graham sacked between 1970 and 1984.

Early in 1980, Rupert Murdoch hired Kosner to edit New York magazine, which he had taken over from founder Clay Felker three years earlier. Kosner ran New York for thirteen years, being responsible for the business side of the publication as well as the editorial side for the second half of his tenure. During his time at New York, the magazine set records for advertising sales and profits and won several National Magazine Awards. While at New York, Kosner served a two-year term as president of the American Society of Magazine Editors. In 1991, Murdoch sold New York and other magazines to a group headed by financier Henry Kravis. Two years later, Kosner left to take the editorship of Esquire, the men's magazine, which he ran until 1997.

The next year, Kosner joined the New York Daily News, the largest tabloid in the U.S., to create and edit a new Sunday edition. In 2000, Mortimer B. Zuckerman, the News's owner, promoted him to editor-in-chief of the daily paper. Over the next four years, Kosner oversaw the tabloid's coverage of a run of major stories, including the "tied" 2000 Presidential election between George W. Bush and Al Gore, on page one for forty consecutive days, the September 11 attacks and their aftermath, and the subsequent wars in Afghanistan and Iraq. Kosner retired from the News in 2004 after a falling out with Zuckerman. In 2006, he published his journalistic memoir, It's News to Me. He began reviewing books for The Wall Street Journal in 2007.

== Personal life ==
Kosner married Alice Nadel in 1959. They have two children. Their son John Kosner is a digital media executive. The couple divorced in 1977. Since 1978, Kosner has been married to Julie Baumgold, a novelist and magazine writer. They have a daughter.
