= Making Waves Academy =

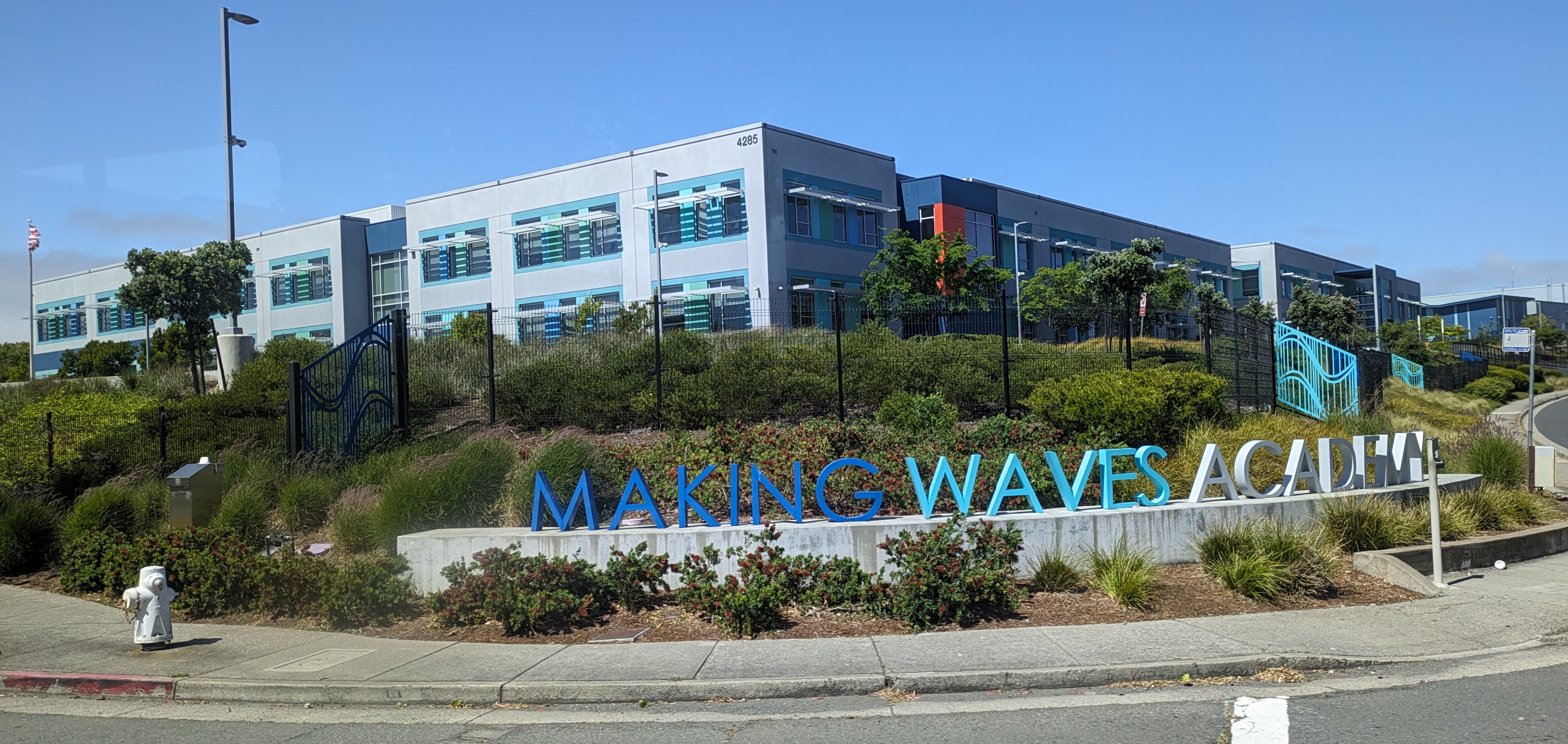

Location
- Richmond, California, United States
- 37.9890°N 122.3328°W

Information
- Type: Charter school
- Motto: Community, Resilience, Respect, Responsibility, Scholarship
- Established: 2007
- School district: Making Waves Academy
- Principal: Middle School: Dr. Ward-Jackson Upper School: Ms. Carr
- Grades: 5–12
- Enrollment: 1,500+
- Colors: Royal blue and grey
- Athletics: Baseball, soccer, volleyball, basketball, softball
- Athletics conference: North Coast Section League
- Mascot: Marlins
- Website: http://www.makingwavesacademy.org

Making Waves Academy is a charter school located in Richmond, California, United States. It started in 2007, and has a middle school and high school.
