= Konner =

Konner is a surname. Notable people with the surname include:

- Jennifer Konner (born 1971), American screenwriter
- Joan Konner (1931–2018), American academic and journalist
- Lawrence Konner, American screenwriter
- Melvin Konner (born 1946), American anthropologist

== See also ==
- Conor
