= Ramona Shelburne =

American sportswriter (born 1979)

- Born: Ramona Leor Shelburne; July 19, 1979 (age 47); Los Angeles, California, U.S.
- Education: Stanford University
- Occupations: NBA Insider and Sportswriter
- Years active: 2002–present
- Spouse: Nevin Barich (m. 2009)
- Children: 2
- Website: ESPN bio

Ramona Leor Shelburne (born July 19, 1979) is an American sportswriter and NBA Insider for ESPN. She is also a former softball player; in high school, she was the 1997 L.A. City Softball Co-Player of the Year, and in college she played outfield for Stanford Cardinal for four years.

== Early life ==
Shelburne is the daughter of James and Jeanette Shelburne, and is Jewish. She grew up in the West Hills neighborhood of Los Angeles.

She graduated from El Camino Real High School in Woodland Hills in 1997. There, she was a four-time All-City Selection in softball, four-time member of Los Angeles Times All-Area team, and the 1997 L.A. City Softball Co-Player of the Year. Academically, she was a National Merit Finalist, valedictorian, student body President, and graduated with a 4.21 GPA.

Shelburne received a softball scholarship and earned her bachelor's degree in American Studies and master's degree in Communication from Stanford University. At Stanford from 1998 to 2001, Shelburne was a three-time Academic All-American athlete in softball, and made appearances in both the NCAA tournament in the 1998 season and the Women's College World Series in the 2001 season. She played outfield for Stanford Cardinal for four years, and as a sophomore in 1999 she was selected to the academic All-Pac-10 second team. Shelburne was softball teammates with ESPN baseball analyst Jessica Mendoza at Stanford.

In 1997, Shelburne submitted her first article on the men's golf tournament to The Stanford Daily in her freshman year at Stanford University.

== Career ==
Prior to joining ESPN, Shelburne spent seven years at the Los Angeles Daily News as a reporter and columnist from 2002-2009. At ESPN, Ramona gained a national following writing about Frank and Jaime McCourt's divorce and the 2010-2011 Los Angeles Dodgers ownership dispute. On February 14, 2016, Shelburne made her radio debut in a national radio show called Beadle & Shelburne which she co-hosts with ESPN SportsNation host Michelle Beadle.

Since the mid 2010s, Shelburne has been a Senior Writer at ESPN. She also regularly contributes to the network’s NBA coverage on NBA Today, ESPN Radio and SportsCenter.

== Honors ==
In 2016 she was inducted into the Southern California Jewish Sports Hall of Fame.

== Personal life ==
Ramona's mother Jeanette Shelburne was a professional screenwriter notably for animated children's television shows, and is a member of the Writers Guild of America. Shelburne has been married to her former Los Angeles Daily News co-worker Nevin Barich since 2009. On October 2, 2018, the couple announced the birth of their first child, son Daniel Charlie Barich. On June 8, 2022, Shelburne gave birth to the couple's second child, son Jacob Bryan Barich.
