= Zach Lowe =

American basketball journalist

- Born: August 24, 1977 (age 49)
- Education: Dartmouth College (BA); College of William & Mary (MA); Columbia University (MS)
- Known for: Basketball journalism

Zachary Curtis Lowe (born August 24, 1977) is an American sportswriter, journalist, and podcaster. After starting his journalistic career covering the criminal justice system in his home state of Connecticut, Lowe transitioned to basketball reporting and is today considered one of the premier columnists covering the National Basketball Association (NBA).

== Education ==
Lowe is an alumnus of Greenwich High School in Greenwich, Connecticut. He graduated from Dartmouth College in 1999 with a Bachelor of Arts degree in history. He spent two years as a teacher at Cresskill High School in New Jersey before earning a Master of Arts degree in American history (with a thesis on the post-Civil War Reconstruction) from the College of William & Mary. He began doctoral studies in American history at Columbia University before switching to journalism, earning a Master of Science from the Columbia University Graduate School of Journalism.

== Career ==
For nearly four years, beginning in August 2004, Lowe worked as a crime, government, and courts reporter for his local Stamford Advocate; then spent two years with The American Lawyer. During that time, he also wrote part-time for the fan-blog CelticsHub.Com. Lowe claims his analytics-based approach to sports-writing is owed to Rob Neyer and John Hollinger, but he attributes his journalism skills to his beat-writer days.

In 2010, he started running the "Point Forward" NBA column-blog on Sports Illustrated. In 2012, Lowe was hired by Bill Simmons to join Grantland as an NBA analyst. In 2015, after the closing of Grantland, his contract was picked up by Grantland's parent company, ESPN. In 2016, Lowe was pursued by Bleacher Report but ultimately re-signed with ESPN on a multi-year contract.

Lowe hosted a weekly podcast called "The Lowe Post", which featured mainly casual chats with other journalists, players, or coaches/GMs about the NBA. He also wrote a weekly NBA article during the season for ESPN headlined as "Ten Things I Like And Don't Like, Including...".

Lowe moderated the 2016 Basketball Analytics panel of the MIT Sloan Sports Analytics Conference.

On September 26, 2024, Lowe was laid off by ESPN, officially leaving the network.

On March 31, 2025, Bill Simmons announced that Zach Lowe would be joining The Ringer podcast network following his dismissal from ESPN six months prior.

In October 2026, Lowe returned to writing by launching a Substack. It generated 24,000 subscribers upon its initial release.

== Writing style ==
Lowe is known for his detailed posts on basketball, use of video clips, and clear writing style. He writes about the entire NBA, unlike many sportswriters who are concerned about a single team. Lowe has cited his early-career work as a court reporter for his evidence-based and balanced approach.

In 2013, Will Leitch called Lowe "one of the best basketball writers working right now" and "certainly the most interesting." Josh Levin, writing in Slate, called Lowe "America's best sports writer."

== Personal ==
Lowe's grandparents immigrated from Syria. He is married to Croatian international media consultant Vesna Jaksic, whom he met when both worked for the Stamford Advocate. They have a daughter and reside in Connecticut.
