= Isaac Chotiner =

American journalist (born 1982/1983)

- Born: 1982–1983
- Education: University of California, Davis (BA)
- Occupations: Journalist, interviewer
- Employer: The New Yorker

Isaac Chotiner (pronounced /ˈtʃɒtnər/ CHOT-nər; born 1981 or 1982) is an American journalist and interviewer, best known for his in-depth interviews with prominent political and cultural figures for The New Yorker. He has been recognized for his probing interviewing style, which often elicits revealing and unexpected responses from his subjects.

== Education ==
Chotiner initially attended the University of California, San Diego, before transferring to the University of California, Davis, in his sophomore year. While in college, he interned for U.S. Representative George Miller.

== Career ==
After graduating from UC Davis, Chotiner worked for John Kerry's 2004 presidential campaign. He briefly worked at a polling firm and interned at the Washington Monthly before joining The New Republic in 2006 as a reporter-researcher, where he wrote on politics and culture and later became senior editor and ran the magazine's book section. Beginning in 2011, Chotiner was a contributor to Slate, becoming a staff writer in 2015. At Slate, he hosted the interview podcast "I Have to Ask" and wrote on a range of topics. Chotiner has also written for The Times, The Atlantic, The Washington Post, and The Wall Street Journal.

In 2018 Chotiner joined The New Yorker as a staff writer, where he became known for his in-depth interviews. His work has earned him a reputation for conducting interviews with a persistence that often causes subjects to cast an unflattering light on themselves. Notable subjects include Karine Jean-Pierre, Cass Sunstein, Alan Dershowitz, Bret Easton Ellis and John Mearsheimer. He has written extensively on the Israel-Palestine conflict, the Trump administration, and democracy in Europe.
