= List of historical NBA over-the-air television broadcasters =

The following is a list of historical over-the-air television broadcasters for the National Basketball Association, in addition to local team coverage.

== Local ==
=== Television ===
Teams	Stations	Years
Atlanta Hawks	KPLR-TV	1959–60 to 1967–68
Atlanta Hawks	WQXI-TV	1968–69 to 1971–72
Atlanta Hawks	WTCG-TV; WTBS	1972–73 to 1983–84; 1988–89 to 1993–94
Atlanta Hawks	WVEU-TV; WUPA	1984–85 to 1985–86; 2001–02 to 2005–06
Atlanta Hawks	WGNX-TV	1986–87 to 1992–93
Atlanta Hawks	WATL	1994–95 to 1998–99
Atlanta Hawks	WHOT-TV	1999–2000 to 2000–01
Atlanta Hawks	WPCH-TV	2023–24 to present
Boston Celtics	see List of Boston Celtics broadcasters	
Brooklyn Nets	see List of Brooklyn Nets broadcasters	
Charlotte Hornets	see List of Charlotte Hornets broadcasters	
Chicago Bulls	see List of Chicago Bulls broadcasters	
Cleveland Cavaliers	see List of Cleveland Cavaliers broadcasters	
Dallas Mavericks	WFAA-TV	1980–81 to 1983–84
Dallas Mavericks	KTXA	1980–81 to 1983–84; 2000–01 to 2010–11; 2012–13 to 2020–21
Dallas Mavericks	KTVT	1984–85 to 1994–95; 2001–02 to 2005–06
Dallas Mavericks	KDFI-TV	1995–96
Dallas Mavericks	KXTX-TV	1996–97 to 1998–99
Dallas Mavericks	KSTR-TV	1999–2000
Denver Nuggets	KWGN-TV	1976–77 to 1987–88; 1990–91 to 1997–98
Denver Nuggets	KTVD	1988–89 to 1989–90; 1999–2000 to 2003–04
Denver Nuggets	KMGH-TV	1988–89 to 1989–90
Denver Nuggets	KPXC-TV	1998–99
Detroit Pistons	see List of Detroit Pistons broadcasters	
Golden State Warriors	—N/a	—N/a
Houston Rockets	—N/a	—N/a
Indiana Pacers	see List of Indiana Pacers broadcasters	
Los Angeles Clippers	see List of Los Angeles Clippers broadcasters	
Los Angeles Lakers	see List of Los Angeles Lakers broadcasters	
Memphis Grizzlies	CHAN-TV	1995–96 to 1996–97
Memphis Grizzlies	CHEK-TV	1997–98 to 1998–99
Memphis Grizzlies	CIVT-TV	1999–2000 to 2000–01
Memphis Grizzlies	WMC-TV	2001–02 to 2005–06; 2024–25 to present
Memphis Grizzlies	WPXX-TV	2001–02 to 2005–06
Miami Heat	see List of Miami Heat broadcasters	
Milwaukee Bucks	—N/a	—N/a
Minnesota Timberwolves	see List of Minnesota Timberwolves broadcasters	
New Orleans Pelicans	WCCB	1988–89 to 1991–92
New Orleans Pelicans	WOLO-TV	1989–90 to 1991–92
New Orleans Pelicans	WJZY	1992–93 to 1997–98; 1999–2000 to 2001–02
New Orleans Pelicans	WFVT	1995–96 to 1997–98
New Orleans Pelicans	WAXN-TV	1998–99
New Orleans Pelicans	WMMP	1998–99 to 2001–02
New York Knicks	see List of New York Knicks broadcasters	
Oklahoma City Thunder	—N/a	—N/a
Orlando Magic	see List of Orlando Magic broadcasters	
Philadelphia 76ers	—N/a	—N/a
Phoenix Suns	—N/a	—N/a
Portland Trail Blazers	—N/a	—N/a
Sacramento Kings	—N/a	—N/a
San Antonio Spurs	—N/a	—N/a
Toronto Raptors	see List of Toronto Raptors broadcasters	
Utah Jazz	—N/a	—N/a
Washington Wizards	—N/a	—N/a

=== Regional sports networks ===
Teams	Network	Years
Atlanta Hawks	SuperStation WTBS	1979–80 to 1983–84; 1988–89 to 1993–94
Atlanta Hawks	SportSouth; Fox Sports South; Fox Sports Net South; FSN South; FS South; Fox Sports South; Bally Sports South; FanDuel Sports Network South	1990–91 to present
Atlanta Hawks	Turner South	1999–2000 to 2005–06
Atlanta Hawks	SportSouth; Fox Sports Southeast; Bally Sports Southeast; FanDuel Sports Network Southeast	2006–07 to present
Atlanta Hawks	Peachtree Sports Network	2023–24 to present
Boston Celtics	see List of Boston Celtics broadcasters	
Brooklyn Nets	see List of Brooklyn Nets broadcasters	
Charlotte Hornets	see List of Charlotte Hornets broadcasters	
Chicago Bulls	see List of Chicago Bulls broadcasters	
Cleveland Cavaliers	see List of Cleveland Cavaliers broadcasters	
Dallas Mavericks	Home Sports Entertainment; Prime Sports Southwest; Fox Sports Southwest; Fox Sports Net Southwest; FSN Southwest; FS Southwest; Fox Sports Southwest; Bally Sports Southwest	1984–85 to 2023–24
Denver Nuggets	Prime Sports Network; Prime Sports Network Rocky Mountain; Prime Sports Rocky Mountain; Fox Sports Rocky Mountain; Fox Sports Net Rocky Mountain	1988–89 to 2003–04
Denver Nuggets	Altitude Sports	2004–05 to present
Detroit Pistons	see List of Detroit Pistons broadcasters	
Golden State Warriors	Pacific Sports Network; SportsChannel Bay Area; SportsChannel Pacific; Fox Sports Bay Area; Fox Sports Net Bay Area; FSN Bay Area; Comcast SportsNet Bay Area; CSN Bay Area; NBC Sports Bay Area	1989–90 to present
Houston Rockets	Home Sports Entertainment; Prime Sports Southwest; Fox Sports Southwest; Fox Sports Net Southwest; FSN Southwest	1983–84 to 2007–08
Houston Rockets	FS Houston; Fox Sports Houston	2008–09 to 2011–12
Houston Rockets	Comcast SportsNet Houston; Root Sports Southwest; AT&T SportsNet Southwest; Space City Home Network	2012–13 to present
Indiana Pacers	see List of Indiana Pacers broadcasters	
Los Angeles Clippers	see List of Los Angeles Clippers broadcasters	
Los Angeles Lakers	see List of Los Angeles Lakers broadcasters	
Memphis Grizzlies	Showcase	1995–96 to 1997–98
Memphis Grizzlies	CTV Sportsnet Pacific	1998–99 to 2000–01
Memphis Grizzlies	Fox Sports Net South; FSN South; FS South; Fox Sports South; Bally Sports South; FanDuel Sports Network South	2001–02 to 2009–10; 2020–21 to present
Memphis Grizzlies	SportSouth; Fox Sports Southeast; Bally Sports Southeast; FanDuel Sports Network Southeast	2006–07 to present
Memphis Grizzlies	FS Tennessee; Fox Sports Tennessee	2010–11 to 2019–20
Miami Heat	see List of Miami Heat broadcasters	
Milwaukee Bucks	WCCO II	1982–83 to 1988–89
Milwaukee Bucks	Midwest Sports Channel; Fox Sports Net North; FSN North	1989–90 to 1995–96; 1997–98 to 2006–07
Milwaukee Bucks	Wisconsin Sports Network	1996–97
Milwaukee Bucks	FSN Wisconsin; FS Wisconsin; Fox Sports Wisconsin; Bally Sports Wisconsin; FanDuel Sports Network Wisconsin	2007–08 to present
Minnesota Timberwolves	Midwest Sports Channel; Fox Sports Net North; FSN North; FS North; Fox Sports North; Bally Sports North; FanDuel Sports Network North	1989–90 to present
New Orleans Pelicans	SportSouth; Fox Sports South; Fox Sports Net South	1990–91 to 2001–02
New Orleans Pelicans	Cox Sports Television	2002–03 to 2011–12
New Orleans Pelicans	Fox Sports New Orleans; Bally Sports New Orleans	2012–13 to 2023–24
New Orleans Pelicans	FanDuel Sports Network Southeast	2024–25 to present
New York Knicks	see List of New York Knicks broadcasters	
Oklahoma City Thunder	Northwest Cable Sports; Prime Sports Northwest; Fox Sports Northwest; Fox Sports Net Northwest; FSN Northwest	1988–89 to 2007–08
Oklahoma City Thunder	FS Oklahoma; Fox Sports Oklahoma; Bally Sports Oklahoma; FanDuel Sports Network Oklahoma	2008–09 to present
Orlando Magic	see List of Orlando Magic broadcasters	
Philadelphia 76ers	PRISM	1976–77 to 1996–97
Philadelphia 76ers	SportsChannel Philadelphia	1989–90 to 1996–97
Philadelphia 76ers	Comcast SportsNet Philadelphia; CSN Philadelphia; NBC Sports Philadelphia	1997–98 to present
Phoenix Suns	Arizona Sports Programming Network; Cox Sports; Cox 9	1981–82 to 2002–03
Phoenix Suns	Fox Sports Arizona; Fox Sports Net Arizona; FSN Arizona; FS Arizona; Fox Sports Arizona; Bally Sports Arizona	1996–97 to 2022–23
Portland Trail Blazers	Northwest Cable Sports; Prime Sports Northwest; Fox Sports Northwest; Fox Sports Net Northwest; FSN Northwest; FS Northwest; Root Sports Northwest	1989–90 to 2006–07; 2021–22 to 2023–24
Portland Trail Blazers	Comcast SportsNet Northwest; CSN Northwest; NBC Sports Northwest	2007–08 to 2020–21
Sacramento Kings	—N/a	—N/a
San Antonio Spurs	—N/a	—N/a
Toronto Raptors	see List of Toronto Raptors broadcasters	
Utah Jazz	Prime Sports Network; Prime Sports Network Rocky Mountain; Prime Sports Rocky Mountain; Fox Sports Rocky Mountain; Fox Sports Net Rocky Mountain; FSN Rocky Mountain; FS Rocky Mountain; Root Sports Rocky Mountain; AT&T SportsNet Rocky Mountain	1989–90 to 2022–23
Utah Jazz	Prime Sports Network Utah; Prime Sports Network Intermountain West; Prime Sports Intermountain West; Fox Sports Utah; Fox Sports Net Utah; FSN Utah; FS Utah; Root Sports Utah	1989–90 to 2016–17
Utah Jazz	Root Sports Northwest	2023–24 to present
Washington Wizards	—N/a	—N/a

== National ==
NBA national radio network broadcasters
Network	Brand	Years
Liberty	NBA on Liberty Radio Network	1950–51 to 1951–52
Mutual	NBA on Mutual Radio Network	1952–53 to 1956–57
AFRTS	NBA on American Forces Radio	1957–58 to 1962–63
CBS	NBA on CBS Radio	1963–64 to 1965–66
AFRTS	NBA on American Forces	1966–67 to 1967–68
Mutual	NBA on Mutual	1968–69 to 1983–84
ABC Radio	NBA on ABC Radio	1984–85 to 1989–90
NBA Radio	NBA Radio Network	1990–91 to 1994–95
ESPN Radio	NBA on ESPN Radio	1995–96 to present
Sirius XM NBA Radio	NBA on Sirius XM	2012–13 to present

English NBA free-to-air television broadcasters
Network	Brand	Years
DuMont	NBA Basketball on DuMont	1953–54
NBC	NBA Basketball on NBC	1954–55 to 1961–62
NBC	NBA on NBC	1990–91 to 2001–02
NBC	NBA on NBC Sports	2025–26 to present
SNI	NBA on Sports Network	1962–63 to 1963–64
ABC	NBA Game of the Week on ABC	1964–65 to 1972–73
ABC	NBA on ABC / NBA on ESPN	2002–03 to present
CBS	NBA on CBS	1973–74 to 1989–90

English NBA cable television broadcasters
Network	Brand	Years
USA Network UA-Columbia MSG Sports Network	NBA on MSG Sports; NBA on UA-Columbia; NBA on USA	1977–78 to 1983–84
ESPN	ESPN NBA Sunday	1982–83 to 1983–84
ESPN	NBA on ESPN	2002–03 to present
TBS	NBA on TBS	1984–85 to 2001–02
TBS	NBA on TNT	2014–15 to 2024–25
TNT	NBA on TNT	1989–90 to 2024–25
TruTV	NBA on TNT	2024–25
NBA TV	NBA TV Primetime	2002–03 to present
ESPN2	NBA on ESPN	2002–03 to present
ESPNEWS	NBA on ESPN	2002–03 to present
ESPNU	NBA on ESPN	2006–07 to present
USA Network	NBA on NBC Sports	2025–26 to present
NBCSN	NBA on NBC Sports	2025–26 to present

Spanish-language NBA free-to-air television broadcasters
Network	Brand	Years
Telemundo	La NBA en Telemundo	2002–03 to 2004–05
Telemundo	NBA en Telemundo Deportes	2025–26 to present

Spanish-language NBA cable television broadcasters
Network	Brand	Years
mun2	La NBA en mun2	2002–03 to 2004–05
ESPN Deportes	NBA en ESPN Deportes	2005–06 to present
Universo	NBA en Telemundo Deportes	2025–26 to present
TeleXitos	NBA en Telemundo Deportes	2025–26 to present

== International ==
Region	Broadcaster	Years
Brazil	Rede Bandeirantes	1986–87 to 2000–01; 2018–19 to present
Brazil	ESPN	1989–90 to present
Brazil	TNT	1991–92 to 2000–01
Brazil	PSN	2000–01 to 2001–02
Brazil	RedeTV!	2003–04
Brazil	Esporte Interativo	2008–09 to 2010–11
Brazil	Space	2008–09 to 2014–15
Brazil	Sports+	2012–13 to 2014–15
Brazil	SporTV	2014–15 to 2022–23
Brazil	Prime Video	2022–23 to present
Philippines	Solar Entertainment	2001–02 to 2018–19
Philippines	ABS-CBN	2012–13 to 2018–19
Philippines	CNN Philippines	2018–19

== See also ==
- List of current National Basketball Association broadcasters
- List of American Basketball Association broadcasters
- Historical Major League Baseball over-the-air television broadcasters
- Historical NHL over-the-air television broadcasters
