= List of Los Angeles Lakers broadcasters =

Broadcasters for the Minneapolis/Los Angeles Lakers National Basketball Association teams.

== Television ==
=== 1950s ===
Year	Channel	Play-by-play	Color commentator(s)	Courtside reporter	Studio host	Studio analysts
1955–56	KEYD-TV	Jack Horner				
1956–57	KMGM-TV	Jack Horner				
1957–58	KMSP-TV	Jack Horner				
1958–59	KMSP-TV	Jack Horner				
1959–60	KSTP-TV	Rod Trongard				

=== 1960s ===
Year	Channel	Play-by-play	Color commentator(s)	Courtside reporter	Studio host	Studio analysts
1960–61	KHJ-TV	Chick Hearn				
1961–62	KHJ-TV	Chick Hearn				
1962–63	KHJ-TV	Chick Hearn				
1963–64	KHJ-TV	Chick Hearn				
1964–65	KTTV	Chick Hearn	Al Michaels			
1965–66	KTTV	Chick Hearn	Rod Hundley			
1966–67	KTTV	Chick Hearn	Rod Hundley			
1967–68	KTLA	Chick Hearn	Rod Hundley			
1968–69	KTLA	Chick Hearn	Rod Hundley			
1969–70	KTLA	Chick Hearn	Lynn Shackelford			

=== 1970s ===
Year	Channel	Play-by-play	Color commentator(s)	Courtside reporter	Studio host	Studio analysts
1970–71	KTLA	Chick Hearn	Lynn Shackelford			
1971–72	KTLA	Chick Hearn	Lynn Shackelford			
1972–73	KTLA	Chick Hearn	Lynn Shackelford			
1973–74	KTLA	Chick Hearn	Lynn Shackelford			
1974–75	KTLA	Chick Hearn	Lynn Shackelford			
1975–76	KTLA	Chick Hearn	Lynn Shackelford			
1976–77	KTLA	Chick Hearn	Lynn Shackelford			
1977–78	KHJ-TV	Chick Hearn	Pat Riley			
1978–79	KHJ-TV	Chick Hearn	Pat Riley		Lynn Shackelford	
1979–80	KHJ-TV	Chick Hearn	Keith Erickson			

=== 1980s ===
Year	Channel	Play-by-play	Color commentator(s)	Courtside reporter	Studio host	Studio analysts
1980–81	KHJ-TV	Chick Hearn	Keith Erickson			
1981–82	KHJ-TV	Chick Hearn	Keith Erickson			
1982–83	KHJ-TV	Chick Hearn	Keith Erickson			
1983–84	KHJ-TV	Chick Hearn	Keith Erickson			
1984–85	KHJ-TV	Chick Hearn	Keith Erickson			
1985–86	KHJ-TV	Chick Hearn	Keith Erickson		Scott St. James	
1985–86	Prime Ticket (Home Games)	Chick Hearn	Keith Erickson		Geoff Witcher	
1986–87	KHJ-TV (Away Games)	Chick Hearn	Keith Erickson		Roy Firestone	
1986–87	Prime Ticket (Home Games)	Chick Hearn	Keith Erickson		Geoff Witcher	
1987–88	KHJ-TV (Away Games)	Chick Hearn	Stu Lantz		Roy Firestone	
1987–88	Prime Ticket (Home Games)	Chick Hearn	Stu Lantz		Geoff Witcher	
1988–89	KHJ-TV (Away Games)	Chick Hearn	Stu Lantz		Roy Firestone	
1988–89	Prime Ticket (Home Games)	Chick Hearn	Stu Lantz			
1989–90	KCAL-TV (Away Games)	Chick Hearn	Stu Lantz		Roy Firestone	
1989–90	Prime Ticket (Home Games)	Chick Hearn	Stu Lantz			

=== 1990s ===
Year	Channel	Play-by-play	Color commentator(s)	Courtside reporter	Studio host	Studio analysts
1990–91	KCAL-TV (Away Games)	Chick Hearn	Stu Lantz		Joe Fowler	
1990–91	Prime Ticket (Home Games)	Chick Hearn	Stu Lantz	Randi Hall		
1991–92	KCAL-TV (Away Games)	Chick Hearn	Stu Lantz		Gary Cruz	
1991–92	Prime Ticket (Home Games)	Chick Hearn	Stu Lantz	Randi Hall		
1992–93	KCAL-TV (Away Games)	Chick Hearn	Stu Lantz		Gary Cruz	
1992–93	Prime Ticket (Home Games)	Chick Hearn	Stu Lantz	Randi Hall		
1993–94	KCAL-TV (Away Games)	Chick Hearn	Stu Lantz			
1993–94	Prime Ticket (Home Games)	Chick Hearn	Stu Lantz	Larry Burnett	Paul Sunderland	
1994–95	KCAL-TV (Away Games)	Chick Hearn	Stu Lantz			
1994–95	Prime Sports West (Home Games)	Chick Hearn	Stu Lantz	Larry Burnett	Paul Sunderland	
1995–96	KCAL-TV (Away Games)	Chick Hearn	Stu Lantz			
1995–96	Prime Sports West (Home Games)	Chick Hearn	Stu Lantz		Paul Sunderland	
1996–97	KCAL-TV (Away Games)	Chick Hearn	Stu Lantz			
1996–97	Fox Sports West (Home Games)	Chick Hearn	Stu Lantz		Paul Sunderland	
1997–98	KCAL-TV (Away Games)	Chick Hearn	Stu Lantz			
1997–98	Fox Sports West (Home Games)	Chick Hearn	Stu Lantz		Paul Sunderland	
1998–99	KCAL-TV (Away Games)	Chick Hearn	Stu Lantz		Alan Massengale	James Worthy
1998–99	Fox Sports West (Home Games)	Chick Hearn	Stu Lantz		Paul Sunderland	
1999–00	KCAL-TV (Away Games)	Chick Hearn	Stu Lantz		Alan Massengale	James Worthy
1999–00	Fox Sports Net West (Home Games)	Chick Hearn	Stu Lantz		Paul Sunderland	

=== 2000s ===
Year	Channel	Play-by-play	Color commentator(s)	Courtside reporter	Studio host	Studio analysts
2000–01	KCAL-TV (Away Games)	Chick Hearn	Stu Lantz		Alan Massengale	James Worthy
2000–01	Fox Sports Net West (Home Games)	Chick Hearn	Stu Lantz		Paul Sunderland	Jack Haley
2001–02	KCAL-TV (Away Games)	Chick Hearn	Stu Lantz		Alan Massengale	James Worthy
2001–02	Fox Sports Net West (Home Games)	Chick Hearn	Stu Lantz		Paul Sunderland	Jack Haley
2002–03	KCAL-TV (Away Games)	Paul Sunderland	Stu Lantz		Alan Massengale	James Worthy
2002–03	Fox Sports Net West (Home Games)	Paul Sunderland	Stu Lantz		Bill Macdonald	Jack Haley or Reggie Theus
2003–04	KCAL-TV (Away Games)	Paul Sunderland	Stu Lantz	John Ireland	Alan Massengale	James Worthy
2003–04	Fox Sports Net West (Home Games)	Paul Sunderland	Stu Lantz		Bill Macdonald	Jack Haley or Reggie Theus
2004–05	KCAL-TV (Away Games)	Paul Sunderland	Stu Lantz	John Ireland	Alan Massengale	James Worthy
2004–05	FSN West (Home Games)	Paul Sunderland	Stu Lantz		Bill Macdonald	Jack Haley
2005–06	KCAL-TV (Away Games)	Joel Meyers	Stu Lantz	John Ireland	Alan Massengale	James Worthy
2005–06	FSN West (Home Games)	Joel Meyers	Stu Lantz		Bill Macdonald	Jack Haley
2006–07	KCAL-TV (Away Games)	Joel Meyers	Stu Lantz	John Ireland	Alan Massengale	James Worthy
2006–07	FSN West (Home Games)	Joel Meyers	Stu Lantz		Bill Macdonald	Jack Haley or Paul Westphal
2007–08	KCAL-TV (Away Games)	Joel Meyers	Stu Lantz	John Ireland	Jim Hill	James Worthy
2007–08	Fox Sports West (Home Games)	Joel Meyers	Stu Lantz	Michael Eaves or Patrick O'Neal	Bill Macdonald	Norm Nixon or Paul Westphal
2008–09	KCAL-TV (Away Games)	Joel Meyers	Stu Lantz	John Ireland	Jim Hill	James Worthy
2008–09	Fox Sports West (Home Games)	Joel Meyers	Stu Lantz	Michael Eaves or Patrick O'Neal	Bill Macdonald	Norm Nixon or Paul Westphal
2009–10	KCAL-TV (Away Games)	Joel Meyers	Stu Lantz	John Ireland	Jim Hill	James Worthy
2009–10	Fox Sports West (Home Games)	Joel Meyers	Stu Lantz	Michael Eaves or Patrick O'Neal	Bill Macdonald	Norm Nixon

=== 2010s ===
Year	Channel	Play-by-play	Color commentator(s)	Courtside reporter	Studio host	Studio analysts
2010–11	KCAL-TV (Away Games)	Joel Meyers	Stu Lantz	John Ireland	Jim Hill	James Worthy
2010–11	Fox Sports West (Home Games)	Joel Meyers	Stu Lantz	Michael Eaves or Patrick O'Neal	Bill Macdonald	Norm Nixon
2011–12	KCAL-TV (Away Games)	Bill MacDonald	Stu Lantz		Jim Hill	James Worthy
2011–12	Fox Sports West (Home Games)	Bill MacDonald	Stu Lantz		Patrick O'Neal	Norm Nixon
2012–13	Time Warner Cable SportsNet	Bill MacDonald	Stu Lantz	Mike Trudell	Chris McGee	James Worthy
2013–14	Time Warner Cable SportsNet	Bill MacDonald	Stu Lantz	Mike Trudell	Chris McGee	James Worthy
2014–15	Time Warner Cable SportsNet	Bill MacDonald	Stu Lantz	Mike Trudell	Chris McGee	James Worthy
2015–16	Time Warner Cable SportsNet	Bill MacDonald	Stu Lantz	Mike Trudell	Chris McGee	James Worthy
2016–17	Spectrum Sportsnet	Bill MacDonald	Stu Lantz	Mike Trudell	Chris McGee	James Worthy
2017–18	Spectrum Sportsnet	Bill MacDonald	Stu Lantz	Mike Trudell	Chris McGee	James Worthy
2018–19	Spectrum Sportsnet	Bill MacDonald	Stu Lantz	Mike Trudell	Chris McGee	James Worthy
2019–20	Spectrum Sportsnet	Bill MacDonald	Stu Lantz	Mike Trudell	Chris McGee	James Worthy, Robert Horry, Derek Fisher, Candace Parker

==== Time Warner Cable ====
On February 14, 2011, Time Warner Cable and the Lakers announced the formation of two new regional sports networks (one in English, one in Spanish) that will exclusively televise the team's games and related programming for 20 years starting with the 2012–13 NBA season.

=== 2020s ===
Year	Channel	Play-by-play	Color commentator(s)	Courtside reporter	Studio host(s)	Studio analysts
2020–21	Spectrum Sportsnet	Bill Macdonald	Stu Lantz	Mike Trudell	Chris McGee	James Worthy, Byron Scott, A.C. Green, Robert Horry, Derek Fisher, Metta Sandiford-Artest, Danny Green, Allie Clifton, Mike Bresnahan,
2021–22	Spectrum Sportsnet	Bill Macdonald	Stu Lantz	Mike Trudell	Chris McGee	James Worthy, Byron Scott, A.C. Green, Robert Horry, Derek Fisher, Metta Sandiford-Artest, Danny Green, Allie Clifton, Mike Bresnahan,
2022–23	Spectrum Sportsnet	Bill Macdonald	Stu Lantz	Mike Trudell	Chris McGee	James Worthy, Byron Scott, A.C. Green, Robert Horry, Derek Fisher, Metta Sandiford-Artest, Danny Green, Allie Clifton, Mike Bresnahan,
2023–24	Spectrum Sportsnet	Bill Macdonald	Stu Lantz	Mike Trudell	Chris McGee	James Worthy, Byron Scott, A.C. Green, Robert Horry, Derek Fisher, Metta Sandiford-Artest, Danny Green, Allie Clifton, Mike Bresnahan,
2024–25	Spectrum Sportsnet	Bill Macdonald	Stu Lantz	Mike Trudell	Chris McGee	James Worthy, Byron Scott, A.C. Green, Robert Horry, Derek Fisher, Metta Sandiford-Artest, Danny Green, Allie Clifton, Mike Bresnahan,
2025–26	Spectrum Sportsnet	Bill Macdonald	Stu Lantz	Mike Trudell	Chris McGee	James Worthy, Byron Scott, A.C. Green, Robert Horry, Derek Fisher, Metta Sandiford-Artest, Danny Green, Allie Clifton, Mike Bresnahan,

== Radio ==
=== 1940s ===
Year	Channel	Play-by-play	Color commentator(s)	Studio host
1947–48	WLOL	Dick Enroth		
1948–49	WLOL	Dick Enroth		
1949–50	WLOL	Dick Enroth		

=== 1950s ===
Year	Channel	Play-by-play	Color commentator(s)	Studio host
1950–51	WLOL	Dick Enroth		
1951–52	WLOL	Dick Enroth		
1952–53	WLOL	Dick Enroth		
1953–54	WLOL	Dick Enroth		
1954–55	WDGY	Dick Enroth		
1955–56	WLOL	Dick Enroth		
1956–57	WLOL	Dick Enroth		
1957–58	WCCO	Dick Enroth		
1958–59	WCCO	Dick Enroth		
1959–60	WLOL	Rod Trongard		

=== 1960s ===
Year	Channel	Play-by-play	Color commentator(s)	Studio host
1960–61	KHJ	Chick Hearn		
1961–62	KHJ	Chick Hearn		
1962–63	KHJ	Chick Hearn		
1963–64	KHJ	Chick Hearn		
1964–65	KFI	Chick Hearn	Al Michaels	
1965–66	KLAC AM & FM	Chick Hearn	Rod Hundley	
1966–67	KNX	Chick Hearn	Rod Hundley	
1967–68	KNX	Chick Hearn	Rod Hundley	
1968–69	KNX	Chick Hearn	Rod Hundley	
1969–70	KABC	Chick Hearn	Lynn Shackelford	

=== 1970s ===
Year	Channel	Play-by-play	Color commentator(s)	Studio host
1970–71	KABC	Chick Hearn	Lynn Shackelford	
1971–72	KABC	Chick Hearn	Lynn Shackelford	
1972–73	KFI	Chick Hearn	Lynn Shackelford	
1973–74	KFI	Chick Hearn	Lynn Shackelford	
1974–75	KABC	Chick Hearn	Lynn Shackelford	
1975–76	KABC	Chick Hearn	Lynn Shackelford	
1976–77	KABC	Chick Hearn	Lynn Shackelford	
1977–78	KLAC	Chick Hearn	Pat Riley	
1978–79	KLAC	Chick Hearn	Pat Riley	
1979–80	KLAC	Chick Hearn	Keith Erickson	

=== 1980s ===
Year	Channel	Play-by-play	Color commentator(s)	Studio host
1980–81	KLAC	Chick Hearn	Keith Erickson	
1981–82	KLAC	Chick Hearn	Keith Erickson	
1982–83	KLAC	Chick Hearn	Keith Erickson	
1983–84	KLAC	Chick Hearn	Keith Erickson	
1984–85	KLAC	Chick Hearn	Keith Erickson	
1985–86	KLAC	Chick Hearn	Keith Erickson	
1986–87	KLAC	Chick Hearn	Keith Erickson	
1987–88	KLAC	Chick Hearn	Stu Lantz	
1988–89	KLAC	Chick Hearn	Stu Lantz	
1989–90	KLAC	Chick Hearn	Stu Lantz	

=== 1990s ===
Year	Channel	Play-by-play	Color commentator(s)	Studio host
1990–91	KLAC	Chick Hearn	Stu Lantz	
1991–92	KLAC	Chick Hearn	Stu Lantz	
1992–93	KLAC	Chick Hearn	Stu Lantz	
1993–94	KLAC	Chick Hearn	Stu Lantz	
1994–95	KLAC	Chick Hearn	Stu Lantz	
1995–96	KLAC	Chick Hearn	Stu Lantz	
1996–97	KLAC	Chick Hearn	Stu Lantz	
1997–98	KLAC	Chick Hearn	Stu Lantz	Larry Burnett
1998–99	KLAC	Chick Hearn	Stu Lantz	Larry Burnett
1999–2000	KLAC	Chick Hearn	Stu Lantz	Larry Burnett

=== 2000s ===
Year	Channel	Play-by-play	Color commentator(s)	Studio host
2000–01	KLAC	Chick Hearn	Stu Lantz	Larry Burnett
2001–02	KLAC	Chick Hearn	Stu Lantz	Larry Burnett
2002–03	KLAC	Paul Sunderland	Stu Lantz	Larry Burnett
2003–04	KLAC	Joel Meyers	Mychal Thompson	Larry Burnett
2004–05	KLAC	Joel Meyers	Mychal Thompson	Larry Burnett
2005–06	KLAC	Spero Dedes	Mychal Thompson	Matt "Money" Smith
2006–07	KLAC	Spero Dedes	Mychal Thompson	Matt "Money" Smith
2007–08	KLAC	Spero Dedes	Mychal Thompson	Matt "Money" Smith
2008–09	KLAC	Spero Dedes	Mychal Thompson	
2009–10	KSPN	Spero Dedes	Mychal Thompson	

=== 2010s ===
Year	Channel	Play-by-play	Color commentator(s)	Studio host
2010–11	KSPN	Spero Dedes	Mychal Thompson	
2011–12	KSPN	John Ireland	Mychal Thompson	
2012–13	KSPN	John Ireland	Mychal Thompson	
2013–14	KSPN	John Ireland	Mychal Thompson	
2014–15	KSPN	John Ireland	Mychal Thompson	
2015–16	KSPN	John Ireland	Mychal Thompson	
2016–17	KSPN	John Ireland	Mychal Thompson	
2017–18	KSPN	John Ireland	Mychal Thompson	
2018–19	KSPN	John Ireland	Mychal Thompson	
2019–20	KSPN	John Ireland	Mychal Thompson	

=== 2020s ===
Year	Channel	Play-by-play	Color commentator(s)	Studio Host
2020-21	KSPN	John Ireland	Mychal Thompson	
2021-22	KSPN	John Ireland	Mychal Thompson	
2022-23	KSPN	John Ireland	Mychal Thompson	
