= List of Los Angeles Clippers broadcasters =

Broadcasters for the Los Angeles Clippers, San Diego Clippers, and Buffalo Braves National Basketball Association teams.

== Television ==
=== Play-by-play ===
- Chuck Healy: 1972–1973 (WBEN-TV)
- Van Miller: 1973–1978 (WBEN-TV)
- Ted Leitner: 1978–1984
- Al Albert: 1984–1985 (KTTV)
- Phil Stone: 1985–1986 (KTLA)
- Dave Diles: 1986–1987 (KTLA)
- Ralph Lawler: 1987–2019 (KTLA, KCOP-TV, KCAL-TV, Z Channel, & Fox Sports Net Prime Ticket)
- Tom Kelly: 1990–1991 (Prime Ticket)
- Joel Meyers: 1991–1993 (SportsChannel Los Angeles)
- Brian Sieman: 2019–present (KTLA, FanDuel Sports Network SoCal)

=== Color analysts ===
- Rudy Martzke: 1972–1974 (WBEN-TV)
- Dick Rifenburg: 1977–1978 (WBEN-TV)
- Stu Lantz: 1978–1983
- John Olive: 1983–1984
- Ted Green: 1984–1985 (KTTV)
- Tommy Hawkins: 1985–1986 (KTLA)
- Norm Nixon: 1986–1987 (KTLA)
- Junior Bridgeman: 1987–1988 (KTLA)
- Keith Erickson: 1988–1990 (Z Channel)
- Kevin Loughery: 1988–1990 (KTLA)
- Mike Fratello: 1990–1992, 2019–Present (KTLA, KCOP-TV, Fox Sports Net Prime Ticket, Bally Sports SoCal, Bally Sports West, FanDuel Sports Network Socal)
- Earl Strom: 1990–1991 (Prime Ticket)
- Jerry Tarkanian: 1991–1992 (SportsChannel Los Angeles)
- Bill Walton: 1992–2002 (SportsChannel Los Angeles, KCOP-TV, KCAL-TV, Fox Sports Net Prime Ticket)
- Mike Smith: 2002–2017 (KTLA, Fox Sports Net Prime Ticket)
- Bruce Bowen: 2017–2018 (Fox Sports Net Prime Ticket)
- Don MacLean: 2018–2019, 2020–2021, 2023–2024, 2024–2025 (Fox Sports Net Prime Ticket, Bally Sports SoCal, FanDuel Sports Network SoCal)
- Chauncey Billups: 2019–2020 (Fox Sports Net Prime Ticket)
- Jim Jackson: 2020–present (Fox Sports Net Prime Ticket, Bally Sports SoCal, Bally Sports West, FanDuel Sports Network SoCal, and KTLA)

When Walton worked for the NBA on NBC, Keith Erickson, Hubie Brown, Rick Barry, Reggie Theus, and Mike Smith served as alternate announcers.

When Fratello worked on NBC, Bob Weiss served as alternate announcer.

=== Pre- and post-game shows, courtside reporting ===
As of 2025–26, Stan Verrett began hosting Clippers Live pre- and post-game shows before and after games on FanDuel Sports Network SoCal. Verrett is joined by analysts Brent Barry and Matt Barnes. Jaime Maggio and Lauren Rosen serve as courtside reporters.

=== Broadcast outlets ===
==== Terrestrial television ====
Buffalo

- WBEN-TV: 1972–1978

San Diego

- KFMB-TV: 1978–1980; 1983–1984
- XETV: 1980–1982
- KCST-TV: 1982–1983

Los Angeles

- KTTV: 1984–1985
- KTLA: 1985–1991; 2002–2009; 2022 - Present
- KCOP-TV: 1991–1996; 2011; 2012, 2017
- KCAL-TV: 1996–2001

==== Cable television ====
- Z Channel: 1988–1989
- SportsChannel Los Angeles: 1989–1990
- Prime Ticket:1990-1991
- SportsChannel Los Angeles: 1991–1992
- Prime Ticket/Fox Sports Net West: 1992–1997
- Fox Sports Net Prime Ticket: 1997–2021
- Bally Sports SoCal and Bally Sports West: 2021–2024
- FanDuel Sports Network SoCal: 2024– Present

=== Television network ===
Station lineup (as of 2022)

Station	Channel	Market
KTLA	5	Los Angeles (flagship)
KSWB	69 (cable 5)	San Diego
KGET	17	Bakersfield
KSEE	24	Fresno

== Radio ==
=== Play-by-Play ===
- Van Miller: 1970–1978
- Ralph Lawler: 1978–1981, 1982–1984, 1985–1987, 1989–1990 (All non-televised games since 1987)
- Jerry Gross: 1981–1982
- Eddie Doucette: 1984–1985
- Pete Arbogast: 1984–1989
- Rich Marotta: 1990–1994
- Rory Markas: 1994–1999
- Mike Smith: 1999–2002
- John Ireland: 1999–2002 (Fill-in)
- Mel Proctor: 2002–2005
- Matt Pinto: 2005–2007
- Brian Sieman: 2007–2018
- Noah Eagle: 2019–2022
- Carlo Jiménez: 2023–Present

=== Color analysts ===
- Rudy Martzke: 1972–1974
- Dick Rifenburg: 1977–1978
- Stu Lantz: 1978–1983
- John Olive: 1983–1984
- Ted Green: 1984–1986
- Norm Nixon: 1986–1987
- Kevin Loughery: 1989–1990
- Keith Erickson: 1988–1990
- Rich Marotta: 1990–1994 (Non-televised games)
- Rory Markas: 1994–1999 (Non-televised games)
- Mike Smith: 1999–2017 (Non-televised games)
- Scott Brooks: 1998–1999
- Norm Nixon: 2004–2005
- Bruce Bowen: 2017–2018

=== Flagship Station ===
Buffalo

- WBEN (1970–1978)

San Diego

- KFMB (1978–1980; 1983–1984)
- KOGO (1980–1982)
- KCNN (1982–1983)

Los Angeles

- KFOX (1984)
- KLAC (1984–1987, March 19, 2016–present)
- KIIS-AM (1987–1988)
- KRLA (1988–1992)
- KMPC (1992–1995)
- KNNS (1995–1997)
- KXTA/KTLK (1997–2006)
- KSPN (2006–2009)
- KTNQ (Spanish; 2004–2009)
- KFWB (2009–March 16, 2016)
- KWKW (Spanish; 2009–present)
- KEIB (2016–present (alternate))

=== Radio Network ===
Station Lineup (as of 2016)

Station	Frequency	City
KLAC	570 AM	Los Angeles (flagship)
KWKW	1330 AM	Los Angeles (Spanish)
KXPS	1010 AM	Palm Springs
KEPD	104.9 FM	Ridgecrest
KMET	1490 AM	Banning
