= List of Charlotte Hornets broadcasters =

== Television ==
=== 2020s ===
Year	Channel	Play-by-play	Color commentator(s)	Courtside reporter	Studio host	Studio analysts
2026–27	DAZN and WSOC-TV / WAXN-TV	Eric Collins	Dell Curry	Shannon Spake		
2025–26	FanDuel Sports Network Southeast and WSOC-TV / WAXN-TV	Eric Collins	Dell Curry	Shannon Spake		
2024–25	FanDuel Sports Network Southeast	Eric Collins	Dell Curry	Shannon Spake		
2023–24	Bally Sports Southeast	Eric Collins	Dell Curry	Ashley ShahAhmadi		
2022–23	Bally Sports Southeast	Eric Collins	Dell Curry	Ashley ShahAhmadi		
2021–22	Bally Sports Southeast	Eric Collins	Dell Curry	Ashley ShahAhmadi		
2020–21	Fox Sports Carolinas and Fox Sports Southeast	Eric Collins	Dell Curry	Ashley ShahAhmadi		

=== 2010s ===
Year	Channel	Play-by-play	Color commentator(s)	Courtside reporter	Studio host	Studio analysts
2019–20	Fox Sports Carolinas and Fox Sports Southeast	Eric Collins	Dell Curry	Ashley ShahAhmadi		
2018–19	Fox Sports Carolinas and Fox Sports Southeast	Eric Collins	Dell Curry; Stephanie Ready			
2017–18	Fox Sports Carolinas and Fox Sports Southeast	Eric Collins	Dell Curry; Stephanie Ready			
2016–17	Fox Sports Carolinas and Fox Sports Southeast	Eric Collins	Dell Curry; Stephanie Ready			
2015–16	Fox Sports Carolinas and Fox Sports Southeast	Eric Collins	Dell Curry; Stephanie Ready			
2014–15	Fox Sports Carolinas and SportSouth	Steve Martin	Dell Curry	Stephanie Ready		
2013–14	Fox Sports Carolinas and SportSouth	Steve Martin	Dell Curry	Stephanie Ready		
2012–13	Fox Sports Carolinas and SportSouth	Steve Martin	Dell Curry	Stephanie Ready		
2011–12	Fox Sports Carolinas and SportSouth	Steve Martin	Dell Curry	Stephanie Ready		
2010–11	Fox Sports Carolinas and SportSouth	Steve Martin	Dell Curry	Stephanie Ready		

=== 2000s ===
Year	Channel	Play-by-play	Color commentator(s)	Courtside reporter	Studio host	Studio analysts
2009–10	Fox Sports Carolinas and SportSouth	Steve Martin	Dell Curry	Stephanie Ready		
2008–09	Fox Sports Carolinas and SportSouth	Steve Martin	Henry Williams	Stephanie Ready		
2007–08	News 14 Carolina, FSN South, and WMYT-TV	Steve Martin	Henry Williams	Stephanie Ready		
2006–07	News 14 Carolina and WMYT-TV	Matt Devlin	Adrian Branch	Stephanie Ready		
2005–06	News 14 Carolina and WJZY	Matt Devlin	Adrian Branch	Stephanie Ready	Gary Williams	
2004–05	Carolinas Sports Entertainment Television and WJZY	Matt Devlin	Adrian Branch	Stephanie Ready	Tom Werme	
2001–02	Fox Sports Net South or WAXN-TV	Steve Martin	Mike Gminski, Gil McGregor or Gerry Vaillancourt			
2000–01	Fox Sports Net South or WAXN-TV	Steve Martin	Mike Gminski, Gil McGregor or Gerry Vaillancourt			

=== 1990s ===
Year	Channel	Play-by-play	Color commentator(s)	Courtside reporter	Studio host
1999–2000	Fox Sports Net South or WAXN-TV	Steve Martin	Mike Gminski, Gil McGregor or Gerry Vaillancourt		
1998–99	Fox Sports South or WAXN-TV	Steve Martin	Gil McGregor		Gerry Vaillancourt
1997–98	Fox Sports South, WJZY, or WFVT-TV	Steve Martin	Gil McGregor		Gerry Vaillancourt
1996-97	Fox Sports South, WJZY, or WFVT-TV	Steve Martin	Gil McGregor		Gerry Vaillancourt
1995–96	SportSouth	Steve Martin	Gerry Vaillancourt		
	WJZY or WFVT-TV	Steve Martin	Gil McGregor		Gerry Vaillancourt
1994–95	SportSouth	Steve Martin	Gerry Vaillancourt		
	WJZY	Steve Martin	Gil McGregor		Gerry Vaillancourt
1993–94	SportSouth or WJZY	Steve Martin	Gil McGregor		Matt Pinto
1992–93	SportSouth or WJZY	Steve Martin	Gil McGregor		Matt Pinto
1991–92	SportSouth or WCCB	Steve Martin	Gerry Vaillancourt		Matt Pinto
1990–91	SportSouth or WCCB	Steve Martin	Gerry Vaillancourt		Matt Pinto

=== 1980s ===
Year	Channel	Play-by-play	Color commentator(s)	Courtside reporter	Studio host
1989–90	WCCB	Ted Robinson	Mike Pratt		
1988–89	WCCB	Gary Sparber	Mike Pratt		

== Radio ==
=== 2020s ===
Year	Channel	Play-by-play	Color commentator(s)	Studio host
2023–24	WFNZ	Sam Farber	Matt Carroll	Rob Longo
2022–23	WFNZ	Sam Farber	Matt Carroll	Rob Longo
2021–22	WFNZ	Sam Farber	Matt Carroll	Rob Longo
2020–21	WFNZ	Sam Farber		Rob Longo

=== 2010s ===
Year	Channel	Play-by-play	Color commentator(s)	Studio host
2019–20	WFNZ	John Focke	Matt Carroll	
2018–19	WFNZ	Chris Kroeger		
2017–18	WFNZ	Steve Martin		
2016–17	WFNZ	Steve Martin		
2015–16	WFNZ	Steve Martin		
2014–15	WFNZ	Scott Lauer		Pete Sousa
2013–14	WFNZ	Scott Lauer		
2012–13	WFNZ	Scott Lauer		
2011–12	WFNZ	Scott Lauer		
2010–11	WFNZ	Scott Lauer		

=== 2000s ===
Year	Channel	Play-by-play	Color commentator(s)	Studio host
2009–10	WFNZ	Scott Lauer	Brevin Knight (Home Games Only)	Pete Sousa
2008–09	WOLS	Scott Lauer		
2007–08	WOLS	Scott Lauer	Muggsy Bogues or Jason Capel (Home Games Only)	
2006–07	WOLS	Steve Martin	Henry Williams	Scott Lauer
2005–06	WOLS	Steve Martin	Henry Williams	Scott Lauer
2004–05	WOLS	Steve Martin	Henry Williams	Scott Lauer
2001–02	WBT	Bob Licht	Mike Gminski, Gil McGregor or Gerry Vaillancourt	
2000–01	WBT	Bob Licht	Mike Gminski, Gil McGregor or Gerry Vaillancourt	

=== 1990s ===
Year	Flagship Station	Play-by-play	Color commentator(s)	Studio Host
1999–2000	WBT	Bob Licht	Mike Gminski, Gil McGregor or Gerry Vaillancourt	
1998–99	WBT	Bob Licht	Mike Gminski	
1997–98	WBT	Bob Licht	Mike Gminski	
1996–97	WBT	Bob Licht	Mike Gminski	
1995–96	WBT	Matt Pinto	Mike Gminski	
1994–95	WBT	Matt Pinto	Mike Gminski	
1993–94	WBT	Matt Pinto	Gerry Vaillancourt	
1992–93	WBT	Matt Pinto	Gerry Vaillancourt	
1991–92	WBT	Matt Pinto	Gil McGregor	
1990–91	WBT	Matt Pinto	Gil McGregor	

=== 1980s ===
Year	Flagship Station	Play-by-play	Color commentator(s)	Studio Host
1989–90	WBT	Steve Martin	Gil McGregor	
1988–89	WBT	Steve Martin	Gil McGregor	

== See also ==
- List of current National Basketball Association broadcasters
