= List of Indiana Pacers broadcasters =

== Television ==
=== 2020s ===
| Year | Channel | Play-by-play | Color commentator(s) | Courtside reporter | Pre-Game / Post-Game show |
| 2026-27 | DAZN | TBA | TBA | TBA | TBA |
| 2020-21 | Fox Sports Indiana | Chris Denari | Quinn Buckner | Jeremiah Johnson | Jeremiah Johnson |

=== 2010s ===
| Year | Channel | Play-by-play | Color commentator(s) | Courtside reporter | Pre-Game / Post-Game show |
| 2019-20 | Fox Sports Indiana | Chris Denari | Quinn Buckner | Jeremiah Johnson | Jeremiah Johnson |
| 2018-19 | Fox Sports Indiana | Chris Denari | Quinn Buckner | Jeremiah Johnson | Jeremiah Johnson |
| 2017-18 | Fox Sports Indiana | Chris Denari | Quinn Buckner | Jeremiah Johnson | Jeremiah Johnson |
| 2016-17 | Fox Sports Indiana | Chris Denari | Quinn Buckner | Jeremiah Johnson | Jeremiah Johnson |
| 2015-16 | Fox Sports Indiana | Chris Denari | Quinn Buckner | Jeremiah Johnson | Jeremiah Johnson |
| 2014-15 | Fox Sports Indiana | Chris Denari | Quinn Buckner | Jeremiah Johnson | Jeremiah Johnson |
| 2013-14 | Fox Sports Indiana | Chris Denari | Quinn Buckner or Austin Croshere | Brooke Olzendam | Brooke Olzendam |
| 2012-13 | Fox Sports Indiana | Chris Denari | Quinn Buckner or Austin Croshere | Brooke Olzendam | Brooke Olzendam |
| 2011–12 | Fox Sports Indiana | Chris Denari | Quinn Buckner or Austin Croshere | Brooke Olzendam | Brooke Olzendam |
| 2010–11 | Fox Sports Indiana | Chris Denari | Clark Kellogg or Quinn Buckner | Stacy Paetz | Stacy Paetz |

=== 2000s ===
| Year | Channel | Play-by-play | Color commentator(s) | Courtside reporter | Studio host |
| 2009–10 | Fox Sports Indiana | Chris Denari | Clark Kellogg or Quinn Buckner | Stacy Paetz | Stacy Paetz |
| 2008–09 | Fox Sports Indiana | Chris Denari | Clark Kellogg or Quinn Buckner | Stacy Paetz | Stacy Paetz |
| 2007–08 | FSN Indiana | Chris Denari | Clark Kellogg or Quinn Buckner | Stacy Paetz | Stacy Paetz |
| 2006–07 | FSN Indiana | Chris Denari | Clark Kellogg or Quinn Buckner | Stacy Paetz | Stacy Paetz |
| 2005–06 | WTTV or FSN Midwest | Al Albert | Clark Kellogg or Quinn Buckner | Stacy Paetz | Stacy Paetz |
| 2004–05 | WTTV or FSN Midwest | Al Albert | Clark Kellogg or Quinn Buckner | Stacy Paetz | Stacy Paetz |
| 2003–04 | WTTV or Fox Sports Net Midwest | Al Albert | Clark Kellogg or Quinn Buckner | Scott Hoke | Scott Hoke |
| 2002–03 | WTTV or Fox Sports Net Midwest | Al Albert | Clark Kellogg or Quinn Buckner | Scott Hoke | Scott Hoke |
| 2001–02 | WTTV or Fox Sports Net Midwest | Al Albert | Clark Kellogg or Quinn Buckner | Scott Hoke | Scott Hoke |
| 2000–01 | WTTV or Fox Sports Net Midwest | Al Albert | Clark Kellogg or Quinn Buckner | Scott Hoke | Scott Hoke |

=== 1990s ===
| Year | Channel | Play-by-play | Color commentator(s) | Courtside reporter | Studio host |
| 1999–2000 | WTTV or Fox Sports Net Midwest | Al Albert | Clark Kellogg or Quinn Buckner | Scott Hoke | Scott Hoke |
| 1998–99 | WTTV or Fox Sports Net Midwest | Al Albert | Clark Kellogg or Quinn Buckner | Scott Hoke | Scott Hoke |
| 1997–98 | WTTV or Fox Sports Midwest | Jerry Baker | Clark Kellogg or Bobby Leonard | Kristi Lee | Kristi Lee |
| 1996–97 | WTTV or Fox Sports Midwest | Jerry Baker | Clark Kellogg or Bobby Leonard | Kristi Lee | Kristi Lee |
| 1995–96 | WTTV or Fox Sports Midwest | Jerry Baker | Clark Kellogg or Bobby Leonard | Kristi Lee | Kristi Lee |
| 1994–95 | WTTV or Prime Sports Midwest | Jerry Baker | Clark Kellogg or Bobby Leonard | Kristi Lee | Kristi Lee |
| 1993–94 | WTTV or Prime Sports Midwest | Jerry Baker | Clark Kellogg or Bobby Leonard | Kristi Lee | Kristi Lee |
| 1992–93 | WTTV or Prime Sports Midwest | Jerry Baker | Clark Kellogg or Bobby Leonard | Kristi Lee | Kristi Lee |
| 1991–92 | WTTV or Prime Sports Midwest | Jerry Baker | Clark Kellogg, Jerry Sichting or Bobby Leonard | Kristi Lee | Kristi Lee |
| 1990–91 | WXIN or Prime Sports Midwest | Jerry Baker | Clark Kellogg | | |

=== 1980s ===
| Year | Channel | Play-by-play | Color commentator(s) | Courtside reporter | Studio host |
| 1989–90 | WXIN | Bill Hazen | Clark Kellogg | | |
| 1988–89 | WXIN | Bill Hazen | Clark Kellogg | | |
| 1987–88 | WTTV | Eddie Doucette | Dick Vitale | | |
| 1986–87 | WTTV | Eddie Doucette | Bobby Leonard | | |
| 1985–86 | WTTV | Eddie Doucette | Bobby Leonard | | |
| 1984–85 | WTTV | Jerry Gross | | | |
| 1983–84 | WTTV | Marty Brennaman | | | |
| 1982–83 | WTTV | Bob Lamey | Scott Edwards | | |
| 1981–82 | WTTV | Bob Lamey | | | |
| 1980–81 | WTTV | Bob Lamey | | | |

=== 1970s ===
| Year | Channel | Play-by-play | Color commentator(s) | Courtside reporter | Studio host |
| 1979–80 | WTTV | Bob Lamey | | | |
| 1978–79 | WTTV | Don Hein | | | |
| 1977–78 | WTTV | Don Hein | | | |
| 1976–77 | WTTV | Jerry Baker | | | |
| 1975–76 | WTTV | Jerry Baker | | | |
| 1974–75 | WTTV | Larry Atkinson | Phyllis Ackerman | | |
| 1973–74 | WTTV | Jerry Baker | Don Hein | | |
| 1972–73 | WTTV | Jerry Baker | Don Hein | | |

1960s

| Year | Channel | Play-by-play | Color Commentator(s) |
|---|---|---|---|
| 1968-69 | WLWI | Brian Madden | |

== Radio ==
=== 2020s ===
| Year | Flagship Station | Play-by-play | Color commentator(s) | Studio Host |
| 2020-21 | WFNI | Mark Boyle | Bobby Leonard or Eddie Gill | Pat Boylan |

=== 2010s ===
| Year | Flagship Station | Play-by-play | Color commentator(s) | Studio Host |
| 2019-20 | WFNI | Mark Boyle | Bobby Leonard or Eddie Gill | Pat Boylan |
| 2018-19 | WFNI | Mark Boyle | Bobby Leonard or Eddie Gill | Pat Boylan |
| 2017-18 | WFNI | Mark Boyle | Bobby Leonard or Austin Croshere | Pat Boylan |
| 2016-17 | WFNI | Mark Boyle | Bobby Leonard or Austin Croshere | Pat Boylan |
| 2015-16 | WFNI | Mark Boyle | Bobby Leonard or Austin Croshere | Pat Boylan |
| 2014-15 | WFNI | Mark Boyle | Bobby Leonard or Scot Pollard | Pat Boylan |
| 2013–14 | WFNI | Mark Boyle | Bobby Leonard | Kevin Lee |
| 2012–13 | WFNI | Mark Boyle | Bobby Leonard | Kevin Lee |
| 2011–12 | WFNI | Mark Boyle | Bobby Leonard | Kevin Lee |
| 2010–11 | WFNI | Mark Boyle | Bobby Leonard | Kevin Lee |

=== 2000s ===
| Year | Flagship Station | Play-by-play | Color commentator(s) | Studio Host |
| 2009–10 | WFNI | Mark Boyle | Bobby Leonard | Kevin Lee |
| 2008–09 | WFNI | Mark Boyle | Bobby Leonard | Kevin Lee |
| 2007–08 | WIBC/WFNI | Mark Boyle | Bobby Leonard | Kevin Lee |
| 2006–07 | WIBC | Mark Boyle | Bobby Leonard | Kevin Lee |
| 2005–06 | WIBC | Mark Boyle | Bobby Leonard | Kevin Lee |
| 2004–05 | WIBC | Mark Boyle | Bobby Leonard | Kevin Lee |
| 2003–04 | WIBC | Mark Boyle | Bobby Leonard | Kevin Lee |
| 2002–03 | WIBC | Mark Boyle | Bobby Leonard | Kevin Lee |
| 2001–02 | WIBC | Mark Boyle | Bobby Leonard | Kevin Lee |
| 2000–01 | WIBC | Mark Boyle | Bobby Leonard | Kevin Lee |

=== 1990s ===
| Year | Flagship Station | Play-by-play | Color commentator(s) | Studio Host |
| 1999–00 | WIBC | Mark Boyle | Bobby Leonard | Kevin Lee |
| 1998–99 | WIBC | Mark Boyle | Bobby Leonard | Kevin Lee |
| 1997–98 | WIBC | Mark Boyle | Bobby Leonard | Kevin Lee |
| 1997–97 | WIBC | Mark Boyle | Bobby Leonard | Kevin Lee |
| 1995–96 | WIBC | Mark Boyle | Bobby Leonard | Kevin Lee |
| 1994–95 | WIBC | Mark Boyle | Bobby Leonard | Kevin Lee |
| 1993–94 | WIBC | Mark Boyle | | |
| 1992–93 | WIBC | Mark Boyle | | |
| 1991–92 | WIBC | Mark Boyle | | |
| 1990–91 | WIBC | Mark Boyle | | |

=== 1980s ===
| Year | Flagship Station | Play-by-play | Color commentator(s) | Studio host |
| 1989–90 | WNDE | Mark Boyle | | |
| 1988–89 | WNDE | Mark Boyle | Clark Kellogg | |
| 1987–88 | WNDE | Mike Inglis | | |
| 1986–87 | WNDE | Greg Lucas | | |
| 1985–86 | WNDE | Greg Papa | | |
| 1984–85 | WNDE | Greg Papa | | |
| 1983–84 | WNDE | Bob Lamey | | |
| 1982–83 | WNDE | Bob Lamey | | |
| 1981–82 | WNDE | Bob Lamey | | |
| 1980–81 | WNDE | Bob Lamey | | |

=== 1970s ===
| Year | Channel | Play-by-play | Color commentator(s) | Studio host |
| 1979–80 | WNDE | Bob Lamey | Ann Meyers | |
| 1978–79 | WIBC | Bob Lamey | | |
| 1977–78 | WIBC | Bob Lamey | | |
| 1976–77 | WIBC | Joe McConnell | | |
| 1975–76 | WIBC | Joe McConnell | | |
| 1974–75 | WIBC | Joe McConnell | | |
| 1973–74 | WIBC | Joe McConnell | | |
| 1972–73 | WIBC | Joe McConnell | | |
| 1971–72 | WIBC | Jerry Baker | | |
| 1970–71 | WIBC | Jerry Baker | | |

=== 1960s ===
| Year | Channel | Play-by-play | Color commentator(s) | Studio host |
| 1969–70 | WIBC | Jerry Baker | | Joe Tait |
| 1968–69 | WIBC | Jerry Baker | | |
| 1967–68 | WIBC | Jerry Baker | | |

== See also ==
- List of current National Basketball Association broadcasters
- List of Indianapolis Colts broadcasters
