= List of New Orleans Pelicans broadcasters =

Broadcasters for the New Orleans Pelicans and New Orleans Hornets National Basketball Association team.

For the 2023-24 season, a deal was reached to broadcast 10 Pelicans games on Fox 8 WVUE-DT and other Gray Television stations. All games, regardless of network, will have Joel Meyers doing play-by-play, Antonio Daniels as color commentator and Jen Hale reporting from the sidelines.

== Television ==
=== 2020s ===
Year	Channel	Play-by-play	Color commentator(s)	Courtside reporter
2024-25	Gulf Coast Sports & Entertainment Network	Joel Meyers	Antonio Daniels	Andrew Lopez
2023-24	Bally Sports New Orleans	Joel Meyers	Antonio Daniels	Jen Hale
2022-23	Bally Sports New Orleans	Joel Meyers	Antonio Daniels	Jen Hale
2021-22	Bally Sports New Orleans	Joel Meyers	Antonio Daniels	Jen Hale
2020-21	Fox Sports New Orleans/Bally Sports New Orleans	Joel Meyers	Antonio Daniels	Jen Hale

=== 2010s ===
Year	Channel	Play-by-play	Color commentator(s)	Courtside reporter
2019-20	Fox Sports New Orleans	Joel Meyers	Antonio Daniels	Jen Hale
2018-19	Fox Sports New Orleans	Joel Meyers	David Wesley	Jen Hale
2017-18	Fox Sports New Orleans	Joel Meyers	David Wesley	Jen Hale
2016-17	Fox Sports New Orleans	Joel Meyers	David Wesley	Jen Hale
2015-16	Fox Sports New Orleans	Joel Meyers	David Wesley	Jen Hale
2014-15	Fox Sports New Orleans	Joel Meyers	David Wesley	Jen Hale
2013-14	Fox Sports New Orleans	Joel Meyers	David Wesley	Jen Hale
2012-13	Fox Sports New Orleans	Joel Meyers	David Wesley	Jen Hale
2011-12	Cox Sports Television	Bob Licht	Gil McGregor	Victor Howell
2010-11	Cox Sports Television	Bob Licht	Gil McGregor	Victor Howell

=== 2000s ===
Year	Channel	Play-by-play	Color commentator(s)	Courtside reporter
2009-10	Cox Sports Television	Bob Licht	Gil McGregor	Jordy Hultberg
2008-09	Cox Sports Television	Bob Licht	Gil McGregor	Jordy Hultberg
2007-08	Cox Sports Television	Bob Licht	Gil McGregor	Jordy Hultberg
2006-07	Cox Sports Television and Cox 4 (New Orleans), The Cox Channel (Oklahoma City)	Bob Licht	Gil McGregor	Jordy Hultberg
2005-06	Cox Sports Television and Cox 4 (New Orleans), The Cox Channel (Oklahoma City)	Bob Licht	Gil McGregor	Jordy Hultberg
2004-05	Cox Sports Television	Steve Albert	Gil McGregor	Jordy Hultberg
2003-04	Cox Sports Television	Steve Martin	Gil McGregor	Jordy Hultberg
2002-03	Cox Sports Television	Steve Martin	Gil McGregor	

== Radio ==
=== 2010s ===
Year	Flagship Station	Play-by-play	Color commentator(s)	Studio Host
2019-20	KLRZ-FM	Todd Graffagnini	John DeShazier	Daniel Sallerson
2018-19	WRNO-FM	Sean Kelley	John DeShazier	Daniel Sallerson
2017-18	WRNO-FM	Sean Kelley	John DeShazier, Victor Howell (alt.)	Daniel Sallerson
2016-17	WRNO-FM	Sean Kelley	John DeShazier, Victor Howell (alt.)	Daniel Sallerson
2015-16	WRNO-FM	Sean Kelley	John DeShazier	Daniel Sallerson
2014-15	WWL-FM	Sean Kelley	John DeShazier	Daniel Sallerson
2013-14	WWL-FM	Sean Kelley	John DeShazier	Daniel Sallerson
2012-13	WWL-FM	Sean Kelley	John DeShazier	Daniel Sallerson
2011-12	WMTI	Sean Kelley	Gerry Vaillancourt	Joe Block
2010-11	KMEZ	Sean Kelley	Gerry Vaillancourt	Joe Block

=== 2000s ===
Year	Flagship Station	Play-by-play	Color commentator(s)	Studio Host
2009-10	KMEZ	Sean Kelley	Gerry Vaillancourt	Joe Block
2008-09	KMEZ	Sean Kelley	Gerry Vaillancourt	Joe Block
2007-08	KMEZ	Sean Kelley	Gerry Vaillancourt	Joe Block
2006-07	WTIX (New Orleans), KTOK (Oklahoma City)	Sean Kelley	Gerry Vaillancourt	Russ Eisenstein
2005-06	WTIX (New Orleans), KTOK (Oklahoma City)	Sean Kelley	Gerry Vaillancourt	Russ Eisenstein
2004-05	WTIX	Bob Licht	Gerry Vaillancourt	Sean Kelley
2003-04	WTIX	Bob Licht	Gerry Vaillancourt	Sean Kelley
2002-03	WTIX	Bob Licht	Gerry Vaillancourt	

== Notes ==
- From 1999 to 2002, the Hornets' three color commentators rotated between television and radio. One would call the game on television and the other two would do the game on radio.

== See also ==
- List of current National Basketball Association broadcasters
