= Ralph Lawler =

American sports commentator

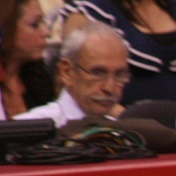
- Lawler calling a Clippers game in 2011
- Born: April 21, 1938 (age 88); Peoria, Illinois, U.S.
- Education: Bradley University
- Occupation: Sports commentator
- Organization: Los Angeles Clippers
- Television: Fox Sports Prime Ticket
- Predecessor: Jerry Gross (1981–1982); Eddie Doucette (1984–1985)
- Spouse: Jo Lawler
- Children: 3

Ralph Anthony Lawler (born April 21, 1938) is an American former television and radio personality. He is best known for his 41-year tenure as the voice of the National Basketball Association's Los Angeles Clippers. Going back to the franchise's six-year stint in San Diego (1978–84), Lawler had broadcast virtually every Clippers game since the franchise moved from Buffalo, New York in 1978 until his retirement, whether it be radio and/or television. There were only two seasons when Lawler did not serve as the team's primary play-by-play broadcaster: 1981–82 (Jerry Gross) and 1984–85 (Eddie Doucette); Lawler returned as the full-time voice in 1985–86. In 2019, Lawler was recognized for his contributions to the game and received the Curt Gowdy Media Award, presented by the Naismith Memorial Basketball Hall of Fame.

Lawler would provide Clippers fans with his enthusiastic commentary, which has made him a fan favorite. He has broadcast more than 3,000 Clippers games, including more than 1,600 consecutive games. He reached the 2,500-game milestone in a game versus the Boston Celtics, on February 26, 2011. Lawler reached the 3,000-game milestone on December 10, 2016, versus the New Orleans Pelicans.

== Life and career ==
Lawler was born and raised in Peoria, Illinois. His broadcasting career began in the 1960s upon graduating from Bradley University in his hometown. Lawler initially worked as a sports announcer at 1440 KPRO in Riverside, California and did some announcing at the Riverside International Raceway nearby. From there, Lawler went on to work in Philadelphia, where he broadcast games for the Flyers of the National Hockey League, the 76ers of the National Basketball Association, the Phillies of Major League Baseball, Big 5 college basketball, and Temple college football. He also worked as a sports reporter for then-CBS station WCAU-TV, before returning to Southern California for good in the late 1970s, calling the San Diego Conquistadors of the American Basketball Association and the San Diego Chargers of the National Football League.

Lawler has worked with Basketball Hall of Famer and current ESPN/ABC commentator Bill Walton. Their broadcasts were wildly popular among Clippers (and many NBA) fans, because of their witty banter. Walton left the Clippers to work exclusively with ABC/ESPN when the two networks acquired the NBA broadcasts in 2002. Lawler's biggest broadcasting influences included Irv Kaze, a former sports executive (who had a stint as a San Diego Clippers general manager and hired Lawler in 1978) and long-time Los Angeles-area sports talk show host, before he died in 2003; and Los Angeles Lakers voice, Chick Hearn, who like Lawler, grew up in Illinois before moving on to Southern California. Lawler and former Clippers guard Shaun Livingston are alumni of Peoria (Central) High School. Lawler had previously worked on Clippers telecasts on Prime Ticket/Fox Sports West alongside former Clipper player and former color analyst, Mike Smith, over 15 seasons from 2002 to 2017. He worked alongside former San Antonio Spurs player Bruce Bowen, during the 2017/18 season.

Unlike other announcers who use headsets while calling the game, Lawler relies exclusively on a handheld microphone during games. His reasoning for it is because he feels he has "much more control over the microphone by holding it." He also added "I've been doing it so long that if I wear a headset, I don't know what to do with my hands."

Lawler and his wife, Jo, have three grown children and seven grandchildren.

On March 3, 2016, Lawler was honored with a star on the Hollywood Walk of Fame. Clippers coach Doc Rivers and several players attended the ceremony.

On September 12, 2018, Lawler announced he would retire at the end of the 2018–19 season. He has missed only three games in his 40-year career.

On February 15, 2019, Lawler was named the 2019 winner of the Curt Gowdy Media Award for electronic media by the Naismith Memorial Basketball Hall of Fame.

== Quotes ==
- Bingo!: when a player makes a three-point basket. The "Bingo" term derives from one-time Clipper and Cleveland Cavalier player Bobby "Bingo" Smith, who hit 22 threes for the San Diego Clippers in the three point shot's inaugural 1979–1980 season.
- Bank Shot Bingo: The rare three-point basket off the backboard elicits this enthusiastic "Lawlerism."
- ...Plus One: A scoring play and a foul resulting in one free-throw.
- Lawler's Law: The first team to 100 points wins the game.
- Fasten your seat belts, gang. We're going down to the wire!: It refers to when a close game is coming down to final minutes (or seconds). The phrase originates from Lawler's desire to emulate Hank Fisher, who was a radio broadcaster for the Bradley Braves men's basketball team during Lawler's childhood. According to Lawler, Fisher used to tell fans to, "get up on their feet and help this ballclub get to the win" whenever the Braves were in a crunch time situation.
- Oh Me, Oh My!: When a player makes an unbelievable and exciting play. Used with positive or negative inflections of the voice, according to whether a player plays for the Clippers or an opponent.
- The Lob! The Jam!: When the team scores off of an alley-oop.
- Out of the Box: When the team with the most turnovers is winning by over fifteen points.
- Settle Down Now, Mike Smith/Bruce Bowen: When Ralph has to tell his announcing pair, Mike Smith (Bruce Bowen in later seasons), to calm down after an exaggerating claim or stat.
- My computer-like mind tells me that's...: introduction to giving a statistical percentage figure (such as shooting percentage, for a player or a team) after having given the raw data. Presumably the "computer-like mind" is actually a calculator Lawler employs.
- Wedgie!: Whenever the ball gets stuck between the rim and the glass of the backboard during a shot attempt or a dunk. This phrase and action is sought after by The Starters, who track and showcase all Wedgies that occur in the NBA on their show.
