= NBA on Mutual =

The NBA on Mutual is the de facto name for National Basketball Association radio broadcasts on the Mutual Broadcasting System. Mutual was the official national radio broadcaster of NBA games (including the All-Star Game and NBA Finals) from the 1968-69 through 1983-84 seasons. Mutual had previously broadcast NBA games as far back as 1954-55. Mutual was ultimately supplanted by the ABC Radio Network.

== Commentators ==
=== Play-by-play ===
- Bill Campbell
- Skip Caray
- Eddie Doucette
- Jack Fleming
- Chick Hearn
- Tony Roberts
- Joe Tait
- Harry Wismer

=== Color commentators ===
- Bob Blackburn
- Hubie Brown
- Art Eckman
- Tom Heinsohn
- Rod Hundley
- Jim Karvellas
- Andy Musser
- Johnny Orr
- Gene Peterson
- Oscar Robertson

Preceded by AFN	National radio broadcaster, NBA; 1968–1984	Succeeded by ABC Radio
