= MACC Fund =

American medical charity

The MACC Fund - Midwest Athletes Against Childhood Cancer, Inc.- was founded on December 10, 1976, during the retirement of Jon McGlocklin from the Milwaukee Bucks. Jon's friend, Longtime Milwaukee Bucks Broadcaster Eddie Doucette, and his wife, Karen, had a son, Brett, who was diagnosed with cancer at the age of 2. Brett's diagnosis coincided with the timing of Jon's retirement. It was decided to use Jon's departure from professional basketball to announce the start of the MACC Fund. During a half-time on the floor of the Milwaukee Arena, the MACC Fund came into being.

== Members ==
Jon McGlocklin was named the organization's President and Eddie was named Vice- President. Living in California since 1978, Eddie is now the MACC Fund's Honorary Vice-President.

Brett Doucette, the MACC Fund's first success story, is married and living in Arizona. His dad Eddie is working as a consultant with the NBA and Jon does color commentary for Bucks televised games with Honorary MACC Fund Athletic Board member, Jim Paschke.

Local athletes, celebrities and community-minded business people comprised the Fund's original Board of Directors. All three groups are still involved. In addition, tens of thousands of people from throughout Wisconsin and the Midwest have embraced the MACC Fund and its mission to offer a special gift of "Hope Through Research to Children with Cancer and Related Blood Disorders."

On August 5, 2019, Becky Pinter was named president and CEO of the MACC Fund.

== Fund-raising and donations ==
Fund-raising is based on the concept of "a good time for a good cause." Special events led the way in the beginning and still comprise about 75% of the Fund's annual income. Brewers home runs and doubles, Packers sacks and interceptions and Bucks 3-point baskets and opening tips raised funds from generous sponsors and cooperative sports teams. Cause-related marketing programs with donations for each purchase followed suit along with a telethon called MACC*ATHON. Women for MACC took up the fight in 1982 with its own impressive fund-raising events.

A yearly telethon/auction of signed and game-used sports memorabilia to benefit the fund on WTMJ-TV has been a staple of the holiday season since the late 1980s, along with the "MACC Star", a yearly Christmas ornament available for sale designed by a child currently undergoing cancer treatment. The MACC Fund's largest annual event is the Trek 100 Ride for Hope, which has raised over $8 million since 1990. Since 2009, the Trek 100 has been held in early June and begins and ends at the home of Trek Bicycle Corporation in Waterloo, Wisconsin. Riders raise at least $2 for each mile they ride, following routes that range from 19 to 100 miles. Packers quarterback Aaron Rodgers also raised $50k for the fund after winning Celebrity Jeopardy.

Traditional donations, memorials, corporate and foundation support and estate planning gifts fill in the other 25% of the Fund's annual income. Total income in 2007 was $3.8 million. The MACC Fund has a full-time staff of 5 that coordinates year-round activities. The 10-year average administrative and indirect fund-raising expense is about 25%.

The MACC Fund has contributed $33 million for pediatric cancer research thanks to the generosity and commitment of people who have taken the time to care for a child with cancer. This research impacts children throughout the country since the successful protocols become the standard for patient care everywhere. Long term commitments take the total to $39 million.

The primary beneficiary of MACC Fund support is the MACC Fund Center for Cancer and Blood Disorders, a collaborative effort of the Medical College of Wisconsin and Children's Hospital of Wisconsin. Research is conducted in the 6-story MACC Fund Research Center of the Medical College of Wisconsin. The MACC Fund also supports research at the University of Wisconsin's Paul P. Carbone Comprehensive Cancer Center where research will be conducted in the MACC Fund Pediatric Cancer Research Wing upon its completion in the fall of 2009. Translational research is supported at the MACC Fund Center for Cancer and Blood Disorders at Children's Hospital of Wisconsin. The MACC Fund committed nearly 1.5 million for the Midwest Children's Cancer Center's annual budget in fiscal 2008. This is about 30% of the Center's annual budget. In addition, support to the UW Cancer Center totaled $600,000 in 2008.

The MACC Fund Scientific Review Board was formed in 1980 to review the work of the Midwest Children's Cancer Center and to review grants submitted from outside this Center. It is made up of leading pediatric oncology practitioners from around the country. The Board does a biennial site review of the Cancer Center. The current Review Board is headed by Dr. Kevin Shannon of the University of California, San Francisco Comprehensive Cancer Center. Past MACC Fund Scientific Review Board Chairs have come from prestigious medical schools such as Yale, Harvard, UCLA and The University of Southern California.

The overall cure rate for all types of childhood cancer has risen from 20% to 80% in the past 50 years. Wilms tumor of the kidney is now 90% curable.
