= Backstage: Lakers =

- Genre: Sports Documentary series
- Developed by: Spectrum SportsNet
- Starring: Los Angeles Lakers (2012–2013)
- Country of origin: United States
- Original languages: English; Spanish
- No. of seasons: 6

Production
- Running time: 30 minutes

Original release
- Network: Spectrum SportsNet; Spectrum Deportes
- Release: October 2012 – present

Backstage: Lakers is a weekly sports documentary television series produced by Spectrum SportsNet which covers the Los Angeles Lakers from an in-depth, behind-the-scenes angle, giving the viewer "unprecedented access" to the team.

The series has documented the season from inside the locker room, the practice facility, the executive offices, the training room, as well as chronicling the players at home with their families and on the road with their team.

A new 30-minute episode debuts every week of the season after the postgame show on Spectrum SportsNet. Re-airs can be viewed multiple times throughout the week on the network and its website.

== History ==
After the landmark rights deal between Time Warner Cable and the Los Angeles Lakers was completed in February 2011, the idea for a weekly series was immediately put into motion based on the original talks of the partnership. Lakers Executive Vice President of Business Operations Jeanie Buss endorsed the proposed show as giving "one of the strongest fan bases in professional sports the access to the Lakers that they crave," while Time Warner Cable Sports executives stated that the Lakers would now allow cameras to go places "where they typically aren't allowed, which is exactly what was envisioned" when the decision was made to launch the networks.

The first episode of the series debuted on the launch night of the networks, October 1, 2012 at 9:00PM PST.

== Seasons ==
=== Los Angeles Lakers (2012-13) ===
Some of the topics covered on Backstage: Lakers in the 2012-13 Lakers season included:

- The arrival of Steve Nash and Dwight Howard in the off-season, as cameras captured both players getting a tour of the Lakers' offices and training facilities on their first day with the team.
- The departure of head coach Mike Brown, the interim head coach Bernie Bickerstaff, and the arrival of present head coach Mike D'Antoni with a behind-the-scenes camera following D'Antoni as he greeted his new players and coached the team at the practice facility for the first time.
- The team's on-going adjustments with injuries to Dwight Howard, Steve Nash, Steve Blake, Pau Gasol, Jordan Hill, Kobe Bryant, and Metta World Peace.
- Lakers head athletic trainer Gary Vitti as he is wired for sound as he tends to an unexpected injury to Dwight Howard during the game.
- Lakers General Manager Mitch Kupchak and his daily responsibilities at the team offices and during the game.
- A special tribute to the life and legacy of Dr. Jerry Buss featuring highlights from his memorial service and a pre-game ceremony in his honor.
- A surprise reunion of an Army officer and his family at a Lakers game on January 25 at STAPLES Center after a brief return from duty in Afghanistan.
- Top-ranked tennis player Novak Djokovic shoots around with the team before a game at STAPLES Center, and meets Kobe Bryant and Dwight Howard in the training room.
- The Lakers coaching staff during a pre-game morning meeting as they review plays and strategy before games against the Miami Heat and the Toronto Raptors.
- Exclusive footage inside the Lakers locker room immediately after the team's comeback win against the Toronto Raptors and a speech by Kobe Bryant to the team, after his 41-point, 12 assist performance, including multiple three-pointers to seal the victory.
- Behind-the-scenes footage of Kobe Bryant in the locker room immediately after his season-ending injury to his Achilles tendon with reaction from Gary Vitti and Head physical therapist Dr. Judy Seto.
- The team's first round playoff series in San Antonio.

== Similar productions ==
=== Backstage: Dodgers ===
Once Spectrum SportsNet LA was launched in 2014, a similar all-access series premiered as well, offering behind-the-scenes access to the Dodgers clubhouse and players off-the-field.

=== Backstage: Galaxy ===
From 2012 to 2017, A similar all-access series chronicled another team partner of Spectrum SportsNet, the LA Galaxy, including exclusive interviews & footage on and off the field. The series premiered during the Galaxy's 2012 playoff run to the 2012 MLS Cup.

=== Backstage: Chargers ===
Starting in 2018, a bi-weekly, behind-the-scenes show debuted for the Los Angeles Chargers, providing unprecedented access to the team during the season.

== Videos ==
- Backstage: Lakers Season Premiere Promo
- "Army Captain has emotional reunion with his family"
- "Behind the Kobe Miracle"
- Kobe on Dr. Seto: "She's Got That Golden Touch"
- Lakers Get a Visit from a Tennis Great
