= Ted Davis (sportscaster) =

American sportscaster

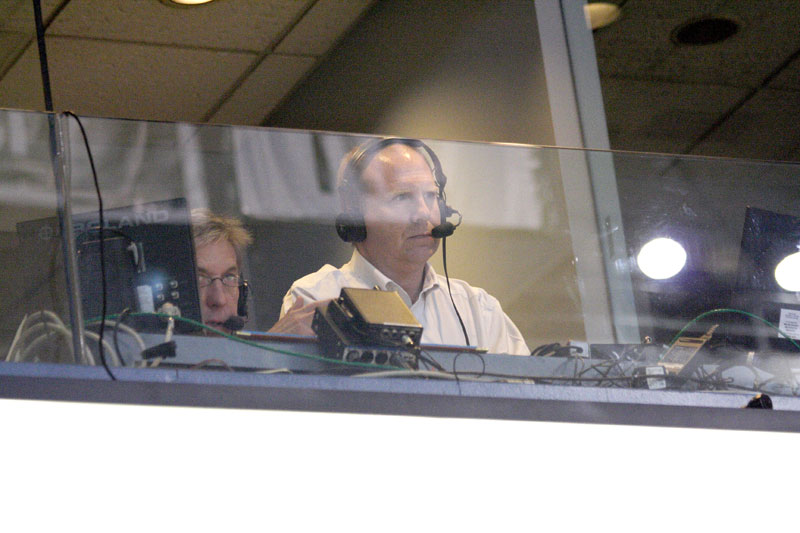
Ted Davis (left) and Dennis Krause call a Bucks game at the Bradley Center in Milwaukee

Ted Davis is the former radio play-by-play voice of the Milwaukee Bucks of the NBA. He was formerly the play-by-play voice of the Dallas Mavericks.

== Broadcasting career ==
Davis began his broadcasting career in Denton, Texas when he was hired by KDNT at the age of 17. After working at KDNT, he resided on the KVIL sports staff for 10 years (1978–88), where he also called Texas Christian University and Texas A&M games from 1982 to 1986 as part of the Southwest Conference radio network. CBS Radio also employed him to cover games for the NCAA Men's Basketball Tournament from 1986 to 1988, and also the NCAA Women's Final Four in 1986 and 1987. Davis also worked as an announcer for North Texas State University, the Mutual Broadcasting System, and KLIF-AM and WBAP-AM in Dallas-Fort Worth.

== Milwaukee Bucks ==
In the summer of 1997, Davis abruptly left his 9-year tenure as the voice of the Dallas Mavericks and joined WTMJ to call games for the Milwaukee Bucks. During home games, Spectrum News 1 Wisconsin sports director Dennis Krause served as color commentator.

Some of Davis' signature calls during Bucks games would be "Bango!" when a Bucks player hit a 3-point shot, which was carried over from Davis' predecessor, Eddie Doucette, and when a game was ending with the Bucks winning, Davis would declare the game over by saying, "it's in the bank and earning interest!" When the Bucks drafted Giannis Antetokounmpo, Davis gave him the nickname of "The Alphabet", since his name seemed to have all the letters of the alphabet, and whenever Antetokounmpo would make a 3-point shot, Davis would call, "A-B-C, easy as 1-2-3 for The Alphabet (though he would later say "...for the MVP" after Antetokounmpo won his first MVP award in 2018)."

During the 2020-21 season, Davis called the Bucks' run to their second NBA title in franchise history, and first in 50 years. At the end of the series-clinching Game 6, Davis told the story of the franchise up to that point when he called:

Tucker with the rebound. The Suns ... are not gonna foul! It's been a 50-year journey! Wisconsin, we've got a room at the top of the world tonight! The Milwaukee Bucks are NBA champions!! Let the celebration begin! Over 18,000 days, Dennis, and they're NBA champions once again!

On August 26, 2021, Davis announced that he was retiring from broadcasting, after a 24-year career.

Since retiring and returning to his home state of Texas, Davis has mentioned on his social media that he'll continue to do voluntary radio broadcasting for local high school football and basketball games.

== Awards ==
Davis was awarded the Milwaukee Achievement in Radio (AIR) award during the 2004–05 season as the best play-by-play broadcaster, an award he also won in 1998–99. During the 1996–97 season, he won a KATIE award for his work at KLIF-AM calling games for the Mavericks.
