= Chris McGee =

American volleyball player and sports broadcaster

- Other name: "Geeter"
- Education: California State University, Northridge
- Occupations: Sports broadcaster Volleyball player
- Known for: Spectrum SportsNet analysis Fox Sports West reporting

Chris McGee (commonly known as "Geeter") is an American sports broadcaster, announcer, and former volleyball player. He currently works as a studio analyst for the Los Angeles Lakers on Spectrum SportsNet. He formerly covered the Lakers and the Los Angeles Clippers when both teams were broadcast on the Fox Sports West networks. He formerly served as the emcee for the Association of Volleyball Professionals, doing player introductions at tournaments.

== Volleyball career ==
McGee played volleyball at Cal State Northridge.

McGee coached Sports Shack Volleyball Club, one of the top girls' clubs in the country.

Geeter is the motivational leader of "Team Fletch", the 4-time Manhattan Beach 6-Man Champion.

== Broadcasting career ==
McGee worked for Fox Sports West from 2003 until 2012, primarily covering the Los Angeles Lakers as a sideline reporter. With Fox Sports West, he also covered the Los Angeles Clippers, Los Angeles Dodgers, Los Angeles Angels, USC Trojans, UCLA Bruins, and local high school sports.

Upon the creation of Spectrum SportsNet (then known as Time Warner Cable SportsNet) in October 2012, McGee was hired as an inaugural member of the Lakers broadcast team alongside James Worthy, Mike Trudell, and Dave Miller. He has remained at the network since and primarily serves as a studio analyst for pregame, halftime, and postgame presentations of Access SportsNet: Lakers.

During the 2020–21 season, McGee made a video pitching the Lakers to free agent Andre Drummond. After signing with the Lakers, Drummond said that he enjoyed the video and watched it several times.
