= Michael Smith (basketball, born 1965) =

American basketball player and commentator

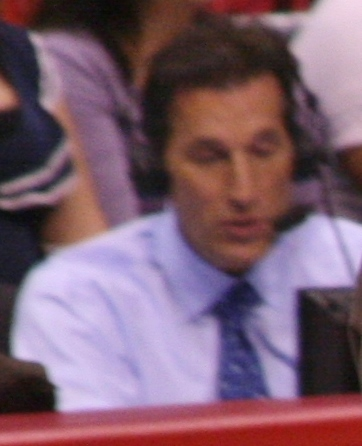
- Smith calling a Clippers game in 2011

Personal information
- Born: May 19, 1965 (age 61) Rochester, New York, U.S.
- Listed height: 6 ft 10 in (2.08 m)
- Listed weight: 225 lb (102 kg)

Career information
- High school: Los Altos (Hacienda Heights, California)
- College: BYU (1983–1984, 1986–1989)
- NBA draft: 1989: 1st round, 13th overall pick
- Drafted by: Boston Celtics
- Playing career: 1989–1996
- Position: Small forward
- Number: 11, 4

Career history
- 1989–1991: Boston Celtics
- 1991–1992: Brescia
- 1992–1993: Capital Region Pontiacs
- 1993: Oklahoma City Cavalry
- 1993–1994: Valencia
- 1994–1995: Estudiantes
- 1995: Los Angeles Clippers
- 1996: Gijón

Career highlights
- Consensus second-team All-American (1988); WAC Player of the Year (1988); 3× First-team All-WAC (1987–1989); Second-team Parade All-American (1983); McDonald's All-American (1983)
- Stats at NBA.com
- Stats at Basketball Reference
Medals
Men's basketball
Representing United States
FIBA U19 World Championship
Gold medal – first place	1983 Palma de Mallorca	National team

Michael John Smith (born May 19, 1965) is an American former basketball player and television commentator. During his college years, he played for Brigham Young University, where he was a consensus second team All-American. As a professional player, he spent two seasons in the NBA with the Boston Celtics and part of one season with the Los Angeles Clippers. He also spent several years playing in Liga ACB and Lega Basket. After retiring from professional basketball, he worked for several years as the television color analyst for the Los Angeles Clippers.

== College career ==
After attending Los Altos High School in Hacienda Heights, California, Smith was a standout basketball player at Brigham Young University. He excelled in both football and volleyball before concentrating on basketball exclusively. Smith served two years (1984–86) as a missionary for the Church of Jesus Christ of Latter-Day Saints in Argentina before returning to BYU to finish his collegiate basketball career. He won the WAC Player of the Year in 1988 leading the team with 679 points and 248 rebounds. He finished his collegiate career as BYU's all-time leader in rebounds (922) and second to Danny Ainge in career points (2319).

== Professional career ==
=== Boston Celtics (1989–1991) ===
Smith was selected 13th overall in the first round of the 1989 NBA draft by the Boston Celtics. He was one of the oldest players in the draft at 24 years old. At the time the Celtics were a playoff contending team. They were championship contenders a few years prior to the 1989 offseason, however the team was declining due to the age growth and injury of star player Larry Bird and the roster had been rapidly changing. The team still made the playoffs in both of the seasons that Smith played for them. In the 1990 playoffs the Celtics faced the New York Knicks. While the Celtics put up a tough fight, they eventually fell in the series-deciding game 5 and lost 3–2.

On February 4, 1990, Smith had a career high 8 assists in a 121–89 win to the Sacramento Kings.

On February 24, 1990, Smith dropped a career high 24 points in a 115–107 win over the Denver Nuggets.

On March 2, 1990, Smith had a career high 10 rebounds in a 122–110 win over the Miami Heat.

In the following season the Celtics returned to the playoffs and played the Indiana Pacers. The Celtics won the series in 5 games and faced the Detroit Pistons in the second round who beat them 4–2. Smith never made the NBA Playoffs in his career ever again.

On October 30, 1991, Smith was waived by the Celtics.

=== Brescia (1991–1992) ===
Smith moved to Italy following his departure from the Celtics. He played the following season with Brescia in Lega Basket.

=== Milwaukee Bucks (1992) ===
Smith returned to the US and returned to the NBA briefly. On October 8, 1992, Smith signed with the Milwaukee Bucks. Smith stayed with the team for 18 days, however before the season began he was waived on October 26.

=== CBA (1992–1993) ===
Smith played in the CBA for the upcoming season, first for the Capital Region Pontiacs and later, the Oklahoma City Cavalry.

=== Valencia (1993–1995) ===
The next season, 1993–94, Smith played for Valencia Basket. He continued in Spain, playing the first part of the following season for Estudiantes.

=== Los Angeles Clippers (1995) ===
Smith left Estudiantes and the following month on February 20, 1995, he found his way back to the NBA and signed with the Los Angeles Clippers, a club he remained under contract with until September. The 30 year old played 29 games for the 1994–1995 season. The Clippers had an atrocious 17–65 season and missed the playoffs.

=== Gijón (1995–1996) ===
Smith joined ACB club Gijón Baloncesto for the following season.

=== Retirement ===
Shortly after his tenure ended with the Spanish team, Smith retired from professional basketball. He would later on pursue a career in basketball analysis/commentating.

Smith was the color analyst for the Clippers on Prime Ticket/Fox Sports West with longtime Clipper play-by-play announcer Ralph Lawler until 2017. On September 28, 2018, the Utah Jazz announced that Smith would be a studio broadcast analyst on select games.
