= Brooke Olzendam =

American sportscaster

Brooke Olzendam is a sportscaster who currently works for the Portland Trail Blazers as a part of their Rip City TV Network broadcast team. She previously worked with Fox Sports Indiana as a host of Pacers Live and sideline reporter for the Indiana Pacers. She also works for the Pac-12 Network.

== Early career ==
Olzendam started her career covering the Washington Huskies as the host of Huskies All-Access, performed sideline reporting for Huskies football and basketball, and served as a host of Runnin' with the Pac.

== Sportscasting career ==
Olzendam is the sideline reporter and pregame/halftime/postgame host for Portland Trail Blazers telecasts since 2014 and does football sideline reporting for the Pac-12 Network. She joined the Pacers in 2011 after spending two seasons with the CBS College Sports Network as their primetime football sideline reporter. She has done sideline reporting for Comcast SportsNet Northwest (now NBC Sports Northwest) covering from professional baseball to horse racing and was the pregame/halftime/postgame host for the Portland Trail Blazers and was the sideline reporter for UCLA Bruins football telecasts on Fox Sports West and Prime Ticket.

== Personal ==
A native of Spokane, Washington, Olzendam graduated from Shadle Park High School and then the Edward R. Murrow School of Communications at Washington State University in 2003. Her father Dave Olzendam is a member of the Washington Interscholastic Basketball Coaches Association Hall of Fame, who won 430 games in 31 seasons coaching at four high schools in Washington, notably Medical Lake outside of Spokane. In 2011, she married Andy Collins, a former college football quarterback at the University of Oregon and Occidental College, and a native of Zillah, Washington, a town of 3,000 located in the Yakima Valley, a two-hour drive from Olzendam's hometown. Collins died ten days after their wedding. Olzendam launched a campaign to raise money for the American Heart Association in honor of her late husband.
