= List of Toronto Raptors broadcasters =

Toronto Raptors broadcasters have provided television and radio play-by-play and colour commentary since 1995. Several broadcasters have worked in both media, and from 2001 to 2004 radio coverage included simulcasts of the television play-by-play and colour commentary.

== List ==
=== Television ===
- John Saunders (Play-by-play, 1995–2001)
- Dan Shulman (Secondary play-by-play, 1995–2001, TSN, 2012-2015)
- Rod Black (Secondary play-by-play, 1995–2001, primary play-by-play 2001–2005, CTV, TSN, Sportsnet, play-by-play, 2014–2021)
- Paul Romanuk (Secondary play-by-play, 1998–2001, TSN)
- Chuck Swirsky (Play-by-play, 2001–2008)
- Jack Armstrong (Colour, 1998–present, TSN)
- Leo Rautins (Colour, 1995–2021, Sportsnet)
- Matt Devlin (Lead play-by-play, 2008–present)
- Sherman Hamilton (Colour, 2008–present, NBA TV Canada)
- Alvin Williams (Colour, 2021–present, Sportsnet)

=== Radio ===
- Mike Inglis (Play-by-play, 1995–1998, CFRB)
- Earl Cureton (Colour, 1997–1998, CFRB)
- Chuck Swirsky (Play-by-play, 1998–2001, CJCL; TV simulcast of play-by-play, 2001–2004)
- Jack Armstrong (Colour, 1998–2001, Fan 590; 2014-present, CHUM)
- Leo Rautins (TV simulcast of colour, 2001–2004, Fan 590)
- Paul Romanuk (Play-by-play, 2004–2005, CJCL)
- Paul Jones (Colour, 1995–1997, CFRB 1010; 2004–2005, 2014–present CJCL; Play-by-play, 2005–2014, CJCL; 2014–present, CHUM)
- Eric Smith (Colour, 2005–2014, CJCL; play-by-play, 2014–present; CJCL)
