= Bill Hazen =

American sportscaster

Bill Hazen is a Chicago-based sportscaster and currently the president of Bill Hazen Productions. He is the host of Stadiums USA on SB Nation Radio.

Hazen was the television play-by-play voice of the Houston Rockets, Chicago Bulls and Indiana Pacers. He also called games for Marquette University basketball and Southern Methodist University football and has done various other sports including Major League Baseball and NFL football. Hazen is currently a broadcaster with the Fort Wayne Mad Ants of the NBA Development League.

Hazen is a graduate of Butler University. He resides in Chicago, Illinois.
