= List of Detroit Pistons broadcasters =

The following is a list of Detroit Pistons broadcasters, past and present.

== Radio ==
The Pistons current flagship radio station is WXYT-FM 97.1. There are several affiliate stations throughout Michigan. The Pistons flagship radio station was WJR-AM from 1969 through 1982.WWJ in late 1980s, WDFN in early 2000s WXYT-FM until the end of the 2013–14 season.

== Television ==
The Pistons current exclusive local television rights holder is Scripps Sports group of local channels, with WMYD as the flagship broadcaster in a syndication network that currently features Grand Rapids Scripps station WXMI, in a contract signed on May 13, 2026. Further stations in the Pistons' region will be announced in the future, primarily as a syndicated offering. Former TV flagship stations include WKBD-TV (1972–2004) and WMYD (2004–2008, sharing rights with WDIV-TV). ON TV, a subscription television service, broadcast games from 1981 to 1983.

== Announcers and hosts ==
=== Television ===
- Tom Hemingway, play-by-play announcer (1967–1968)
- Ray Lane, play-by-play announcer (1971–1972)
- Dave Diles, play-by-play announcer (1973–1975)
- Bob Wolff, play-by-play announcer (1975–1978)
- George Blaha: play-by-play (1978–present)
- Don Shane: play-by-play (1981–1983)
- Dennis Franklin: color commentator (1981–1982)
- John Mengelt: color commentator (1982–1983, 1986–1987)
- Dave Bing: color commentator (1982–1985)
- Fred McLeod: play-by-play (1984–2006)
- Tom Wilson: color commentator (1984–1993)
- Kevin Loughery: color commentator (1985–1986)
- Dick Motta: color commentator (1987–1989)
- John MacLeod: color commentator (1989–1990)
- Greg Kelser: color commentator (1993–present)
- Dick Harter: color commentator (1990–1991)
- Ron Rothstein: color commentator (1991–1992)
- Mike Fratello: color commentator (1992–1993)
- Kelly Tripucka: color commentator (1993–2001)
- Bill Laimbeer: color commentator (2001–2006)
- Mateen Cleaves: studio analyst (2010–2019).

=== Radio ===
- Bill Flemming, play-by-play announcer (1957–1962)
- Don Wattrick, play-by-play announcer (1962–1964)
- Milt Hopwood, play-by-play announcer (1964–1969)
- Paul Carey, play-by-play announcer (1969–1973)
- Don Howe, play-by-play announcer (1973–1976)
- Tom Hemingway, color commentator (1973–1980)
- George Blaha: play-by-play (1976–1980, 1982–present) Primary radio announcer until 2006. Currently does radio play-by-play when Pistons are on national television.
- Paul Keels, play-by-play announcer (1980–1982)
- Greg Kelser: color commentator (1988–1993)
- Mark Champion: radio play-by-play (1991–1996, 2000–present).
- Vinnie Johnson, color commentator (1993–2001)
- Larry Henry, play-by-play announcer (1996–2000)
- Rick Mahorn: color commentator (2001–present)
