= Spectrum SportsNet =

American regional sports cable network serving Los Angeles, California

- Type: Regional sports network
- Country: United States
- Broadcast area: Southern California; Central California; Las Vegas Valley; Hawaii; Nationwide (via satellite)
- Headquarters: El Segundo, California

Programming
- Languages: English; Spanish (via SAP)
- Picture format: 1080i (HDTV); 480i (SDTV)

Ownership
- Owner: Charter Communications (50%); Los Angeles Lakers (50%)
- Sister channels: SportsNet LA

History
- Launched: October 1, 2012; 14 years ago
- Former names: Time Warner Cable SportsNet and Time Warner Cable Deportes (2012–2016); Spectrum Deportes (2016–2018)

Links
- Website: Spectrum SportsNet.com

Availability

Streaming media
- DirecTV Stream: Internet Protocol television

Spectrum SportsNet, formerly Time Warner Cable SportsNet (abbreviated as TWC SportsNet), is an American regional sports cable and satellite television network owned by Charter Communications through its acquisition of Time Warner Cable in May 2016, with the Los Angeles Lakers maintaining editorial control over the content, including team-assigned reporters and anchors, as well as team-related programming. The network is based near the Lakers' team headquarters in the Los Angeles suburb of El Segundo, California.

Spectrum SportsNet launched at 7:00 p.m. Pacific Time on October 1, 2012. Spectrum SportsNet serves the Los Angeles and San Diego metropolitan areas, the Palm Springs Area, the Central Coast of California, Las Vegas and Hawaii.

Lakers game broadcasts serve as the centerpiece for the network. Spectrum SportsNet has been the exclusive home of all Lakers games that are not televised nationally since the 2012–13 NBA season. Other sports events aired on the network include Los Angeles Galaxy soccer and Los Angeles Sparks basketball games.

Spectrum Deportes (formerly Time Warner Cable Deportes, abbreviated as TWC Deportes), which was the first Spanish-language regional sports network in the U.S. at launch, was shut down on August 15, 2018, citing a lack of viewership.

Game broadcasts are carried in high definition in English. A Spanish-language audio track is provided for all Lakers and Galaxy games via the second audio program function available on most television sets and cable receiver boxes. A Korean-language audio track has been provided via the second audio program from 2012 to 2018; as a result, Spectrum SportsNet was the first English-language television network to offer Asian-language play-by-play audio of sporting events.

On April 1, 2020, it was announced that along with its sister station (SportsNet LA), Spectrum SportsNet would be added to AT&T's streaming platforms (AT&T TV and AT&T TV NOW) joining DirecTV and AT&T U-verse which already carried the channel. The channel was officially added to customers with the CHOICE package or higher on the morning of April 8, 2020.

== History ==
=== Los Angeles Lakers ===
On February 14, 2011, the Lakers and Time Warner Cable signed a $3 billion, 20-year cable television agreement which took effect in the fall of 2012. The network televises every Lakers game not designated for an exclusive broadcast by either ABC, NBC, ESPN or for streaming on Amazon Prime Video. The new venture ended long-standing broadcast partnerships with KCAL-TV (channel 9), which (dating back to its days as KHJ-TV) had televised the Lakers' road games since the 1977–78 season; and with Fox Sports West (now Bally Sports West), which in all of its incarnations had broadcast the team's home games since the 1985–86 season. The Lakers joined a growing list of NBA franchises that have abandoned over-the-air local telecasts in favor of their games being available exclusively on cable and satellite. Besides live games, the network also feature a team news magazine program, classic games, profiles of Laker players past and present, and exclusive video-on-demand content that is available both online and on television.

As part of the agreement with Time Warner, the team stated that it would work with the cable provider to ensure that other providers within the Lakers' designated broadcast territory (parts of Southern California, including the San Diego, Palm Springs and Santa Barbara markets, as well as Southern Nevada and Hawaii) would have access to the network. As of 2012, the only television providers that does not carry the channel are satellite provider Dish, cable company Comcast serving Northern Santa Barbara County, and IPTV's CenturyLink Prism TV serving Las Vegas Valley. Frontier FiOS carried the channel until 2019. Time Warner offers the channel for $3.95 a subscriber, comparable to other regional sports networks, but other providers were concerned that this cost could increase substantially should the Los Angeles Dodgers begin carrying their games on Time Warner Cable SportsNet; while Time Warner Cable did later reach a 25-year agreement with the Dodgers, the provider created a separate channel, SportsNet LA, to carry that team's games and other Dodgers-related programming.

=== Los Angeles Galaxy ===
On November 18, 2011, Time Warner Cable Sports announced a broadcast rights agreement with the MLS's Los Angeles Galaxy a ten-year deal starting with the 2013 season in which the team will be paid $55 million during the contractual period. The network will televise all Galaxy matches that are not televised on a national network, and will also broadcast matches involving non-MLS opponents. Similar to the agreement with the Lakers, the Galaxy also has supplementary programming featured on the networks, including a weekly team magazine and possible classic matches.

Prior to the network launch, Anaheim-based independent station KDOC-TV (channel 56) televised 18 Galaxy matches for the 2012 MLS season, with production handled by Time Warner Cable SportsNet. The new network then televised the remainder of the Galaxy's schedule beginning in October 2012. (KDOC also televised select matches featuring the Galaxy's former stadium-mate and crosstown rival, Chivas USA, until that team was folded after the 2014 season.) Much like the Lakers, the Galaxy formerly maintained a long-standing broadcast agreement with Fox Sports West and Prime Ticket.

=== Los Angeles Sparks ===
On March 14, 2012, it was announced that the channel had signed a multi-year deal with the WNBA's Los Angeles Sparks franchise. Although the deal was reported as being non-exclusive, all of the televised games during the 2013 season aired on TWC SportsNet, except for those that were nationally broadcast on ABC, ESPN or ESPN2 (as with the Galaxy, KDOC aired the 2012 schedule in preparation for the launch of the new channels).

Since the 2018 WNBA season, because the Las Vegas Aces hold territorial rights for all of Southern Nevada, Los Angeles Sparks games are blacked out in the Las Vegas Valley on Spectrum SportsNet regardless of the cable or satellite provider, requiring a subscription to the WNBA League Pass out-of-market sports package to view those telecasts. All other sports programming, with the exception of Sparks basketball games carried on Spectrum SportsNet, is available in Southern Nevada.

=== Los Angeles Dodgers ===
On January 23, 2013, Time Warner Cable and the Los Angeles Dodgers reached a deal to create a new channel called SportsNet LA, which would become the exclusive local carrier of the Major League Baseball franchise's games starting with the 2014 season. Time Warner Cable outbid Fox Sports Net for the contract, which runs for 25 years through 2039 and is estimated to be worth $8.35 billion. At the time of the announcement, the team was supposed to be considering offering a package of games to be aired over Fox Television Stations' two Los Angeles outlets, Fox owned-and-operated station KTTV (channel 11) and MyNetworkTV owned-and-operated station KCOP-TV.

Because the San Diego Padres hold territorial rights for all of San Diego County, Los Angeles Dodgers games are blacked out in the county on Spectrum SportsNet LA regardless of the cable or satellite provider, requiring a subscription to the MLB Extra Innings out-of-market sports package to view those telecasts. All other sports programming, with the exception of Dodgers baseball games carried on Spectrum SportsNet LA, is available in San Diego County.

=== Los Angeles Chargers ===
On August 2, 2018, Spectrum SportsNet announced a content and programming partnership agreement with the NFL's Los Angeles Chargers to deliver a new documentary series, Backstage: Chargers. A bi-weekly all-access half-hour series chronicling the LA Chargers games, players and executives from a behind-the-scenes perspective during the team's season. Bi-weekly episodes will also re-air on the Chargers local TV partner, KCBS-TV (CBS 2) and on Facebook Watch.

Since the 2020 NFL season, because the Las Vegas Raiders hold territorial rights for all of Southern Nevada, Los Angeles Chargers’ programming and preseason games are blacked out in the Las Vegas Valley on Spectrum SportsNet regardless of the cable or satellite provider. All other sports programming, with the exception of Chargers football games carried on Spectrum SportsNet, is available in Southern Nevada.

=== Other sports programming rights ===
Spectrum SportsNet also airs live broadcasts of the football and boys' basketball championship games of the California Interscholastic Federation and Los Angeles City Section, the CIF state championship games in boys' and girls' basketball, and the regional and state bowl games in football. It also carries select games of the Lakers-owned NBA G League team, the Coachella Valley Lakers. Spectrum Deportes also aired Pro Footvolley Tour.

For the 2012–13 athletic season, Spectrum SportsNet aired select football and men's basketball games from the Mountain West Conference that were not televised on a national basis; one or both of the teams playing in nearly all of the telecasts that the network aired that season involved the San Diego State (SDSU) Aztecs and the University of Nevada Las Vegas (UNLV) Rebels, both universities are in the network's primary service area. It lost the rights to Mountain West games beginning with the 2013–14 season due to new broadcast agreements signed by the conference; some SDSU games that are not nationally televised are now carried on Fox Sports San Diego, while some UNLV games are seen on AT&T SportsNet Rocky Mountain.

Since the 2012–13 athletic season, Spectrum SportsNet aired select men's basketball games from the West Coast Conference that were not televised on a national basis. Three universities (Loyola Marymount Lions, Pepperdine Waves and San Diego Toreros) are in the network's primary service area.

Spectrum SportsNet has also aired the NBC program Poker After Dark and some action sports events, while airs a weekly lucha libre card taped in Mexico City. For the 2014 MLS season, Spectrum Deportes agreed to carry Chivas USA matches in Spanish that are not televised on a national network in their final season before the team disbands.

on July 30, 2025, Spectrum SportsNet signed a new TV broadcasting contract with the CIF Southern Section to televise Friday night high school football games presented by the Southern California Ford Dealers. The contract is for three seasons, and it will include the Division 1 playoff and championship games along with the Southern California regional and state championship games.

== On-air staff ==
=== Current on-air staff ===
- Mike Bresnahan – Lakers insider/studio analyst
- Allie Clifton – Lakers and Sparks studio host
- Beto Duran – Lakers, and Sparks fill-in host, Coachella Valley Lakers fill-in play-by-play
- Derek Fisher – Lakers studio analyst
- A.C. Green – Lakers studio analyst, Coachella Valley Lakers color commentator
- Rahshaun Haylock – Sparks play-by-play
- Robert Horry – Lakers studio analyst
- Rosalyn Gold-Onwude – Sparks color commentator
- Kristen Lago – Sparks sideline reporter (home games only), Coachella Valley Lakers sideline reporter (home games only)
- Taylor Schaub – host and reporter
- Stu Lantz – Lakers color commentator
- Bill Macdonald – Lakers play-by-play announcer
- Adrian Garcia Marquez – Lakers play-by-play (Spanish)
- Chris McGee – Lakers, and Sparks studio host
- Francisco Pinto – Lakers color commentator (Spanish)
- Eric Rothman — Coachella Valley Lakers play-by-play
- Roqui Theus - Lakers sideline reporter
- Mike Trudell – Lakers sideline reporter
- James Worthy – Lakers studio analyst

== Original programming ==
In addition to live coverage of Lakers, Galaxy, and Sparks games, and their respective pre- and post-game shows, other original programming on Spectrum SportsNet includes:

- Backstage: Lakers – a weekly half-hour series chronicling Lakers games, players and executives from a behind-the-scenes perspective during the team's season
- Backstage: Galaxy – an all-access series chronicling the LA Galaxy, including exclusive interviews, and on- and off-field footage. The series premiered during the Galaxy's 2012 playoff run to the 2012 MLS Cup, and returned in the 2013 to cover the team's season that year from a behind-the-scenes perspective.
- Backstage: Sparks – a weekly half-hour series chronicling Sparks games, players and executives from a behind-the-scenes perspective during the team's season.
- Connected With... – a half-hour signature sitdown interview program featuring interviews with professional athletes, sports insiders and Southern California personalities—conducted by sports and entertainment personality Kevin Frazier. Early episodes included interviews with Steve Nash, Landon Donovan, Mitch Kupchak and Dwight Howard.
- #LakeShow – Lakers daily interactive program where the voice of the fan is heard via social media
- Lakers Compacto – an hour-long recap of each Lakers game the day after the game's telecast
- Galaxy Compacto – an hour-long recap of each Galaxy game the day after the game's telecast
- Laker Girls – a five-episode series documenting the selection process of the Laker Girls for the 2012–13 basketball season
- Through the Lens – a look at the Lakers' storied history through the eyes and camera lens of long-time Lakers team photographer Andy Bernstein

=== Archival programs ===
- Timeless Lakers – telecasts of classic LA Lakers games
- Timeless Galaxy – telecasts of classic LA Galaxy games
- Lakers Top 10 – an hour-long countdown of the greatest moments in Lakers history
- Galaxy Top 10 – a half-hour countdown of the greatest moments in Galaxy history

== Spectrum SportsNet+ ==
On October 27, 2023, Spectrum Sportsnet launched Spectrum SportsNet+. The direct-to-consumer streaming service provides a live stream of Spectrum SportsNet, including live Lakers games, for $19.99 per month or $179.99 per season, throughout Southern California, Hawaii and Southern Nevada.
