= Mike Trudell =

American basketball reporter

- Education: Orono High School, Northwestern University
- Occupations: Sideline reporter Radio host
- Years active: 2001–present
- Employer(s): Spectrum SportsNet; Lakers.com; ESPN

Mike Trudell is an American basketball reporter, writer, radio host, and former college soccer player. He currently covers the Los Angeles Lakers as the sideline reporter for Spectrum SportsNet. He is also a beat writer for the official Lakers website. Trudell formerly hosted the Thompson & Trudell radio show with Mychal Thompson for KSPN.

== Early life ==
Mike Trudell was raised in the Orono, Minnesota area near Lake Minnetonka. Trudell attended Orono High School and played soccer as a midfielder. Trudell attended Northwestern University where he earned a bachelor's degree in broadcast journalism and was a member of the Northwestern Wildcats men's soccer team.

== Career ==
Trudell began his media career with several broadcast and sports media internships, including roles with the Baltimore Ravens, the National Football League, Fox Sports, and CLTV Chicago. He later worked as a reporter for the Minnesota Timberwolves before he was hired to cover the Lakers for Spectrum SportsNet at its inception in October 2012 when it was originally known as Time Warner Cable SportsNet. He joined Chris McGee and James Worthy on the network's inaugural staff. In 2015, Trudell became the co-host of KSPN's Thompson & Trudell weekday morning show alongside former Lakers center Mychal Thompson. The show ran until it was cancelled in October 2017.
