= Bill Macdonald =

American professional sportscaster

Bill Macdonald is an American professional sportscaster who is currently the TV play-by-play announcer for the Los Angeles Lakers of the National Basketball Association (NBA) on Spectrum SportsNet alongside color commentator Stu Lantz. Macdonald has also filled in as the Los Angeles Angels, Anaheim Ducks and Los Angeles Kings play-by-play announcer over the years. He has a bachelor's degree in communications from the University of Southern California.

== Career ==
Macdonald joined the network, then called Prime Ticket, at its inception in 1985. He has also worked for Fox Sports West/Prime Ticket In the past, Macdonald has hosted the following pre-game and in-game shows:

- Lakers Live, from Staples Center with analyst Norm Nixon
- Angels Live, from Angel Stadium with José Mota
- Ducks Live, from Honda Center with Brian Hayward

== Background ==
He is also the former host of the Los Angeles Kings' pregame show Break the Ice and calls play-by-play for Los Angeles Avengers Arena Football, UCLA college football and basketball for FSN Prime Ticket. He has also been the host of FSN's Pacific-10 Conference men's basketball tournament coverage at the Staples Center for the past several years. For the past three years, Macdonald has hosted the UCLA Press Conference Show, with Matt Stevens in 2005 and 2006, and James Washington in 2007. Macdonald called the game (January 22, 2006) in which Kobe Bryant scored 81 points, the second-highest total in NBA history.(Regular commentator Joel Meyers was unavailable, as his National Football League commitments for Westwood One radio took precedence.) When Meyers left the Lakers at the end of the 2010–2011 season due to the team not renewing his contract, the Lakers hired Macdonald to replace him. Macdonald has been the team's play-by-play voice full-time since the 2011–2012 season.

Macdonald has three sons, two of which are identical twins, and resides in Newport Beach, California.
