= List of Cleveland Cavaliers broadcasters =

The Cleveland Cavaliers are currently heard on the radio via the Cavaliers AudioVerse, with flagship stations WTAM (1100 AM and 106.9 FM) and WMMS (100.7 FM). Since 2019, Tim Alcorn has been the team's lead play-by-play voice, while Mike Snyder serves as pre-game/post-game host, the latter duties shared with Cleveland native and former NBA player Brad Sellers. Spanish-language broadcasts of home games are heard on WJMO (1300 AM), with Rafael Hernandez Brito as the lead announcer.

Excluding nationally-televised games, all games are available over streaming service DAZN, with 15 over-the-air television simulcasts per season over WOIO (channel 19), WUAB (channel 43) and Rock Entertainment Sports Network, the latter serving as a producer for DAZN. John Michael handles the play-by-play duties, former Cavalier Brad Daugherty as color commentator, and Serena Winters as sideline reporter.

Years are listed in descending order. Gold shading indicates championship season.

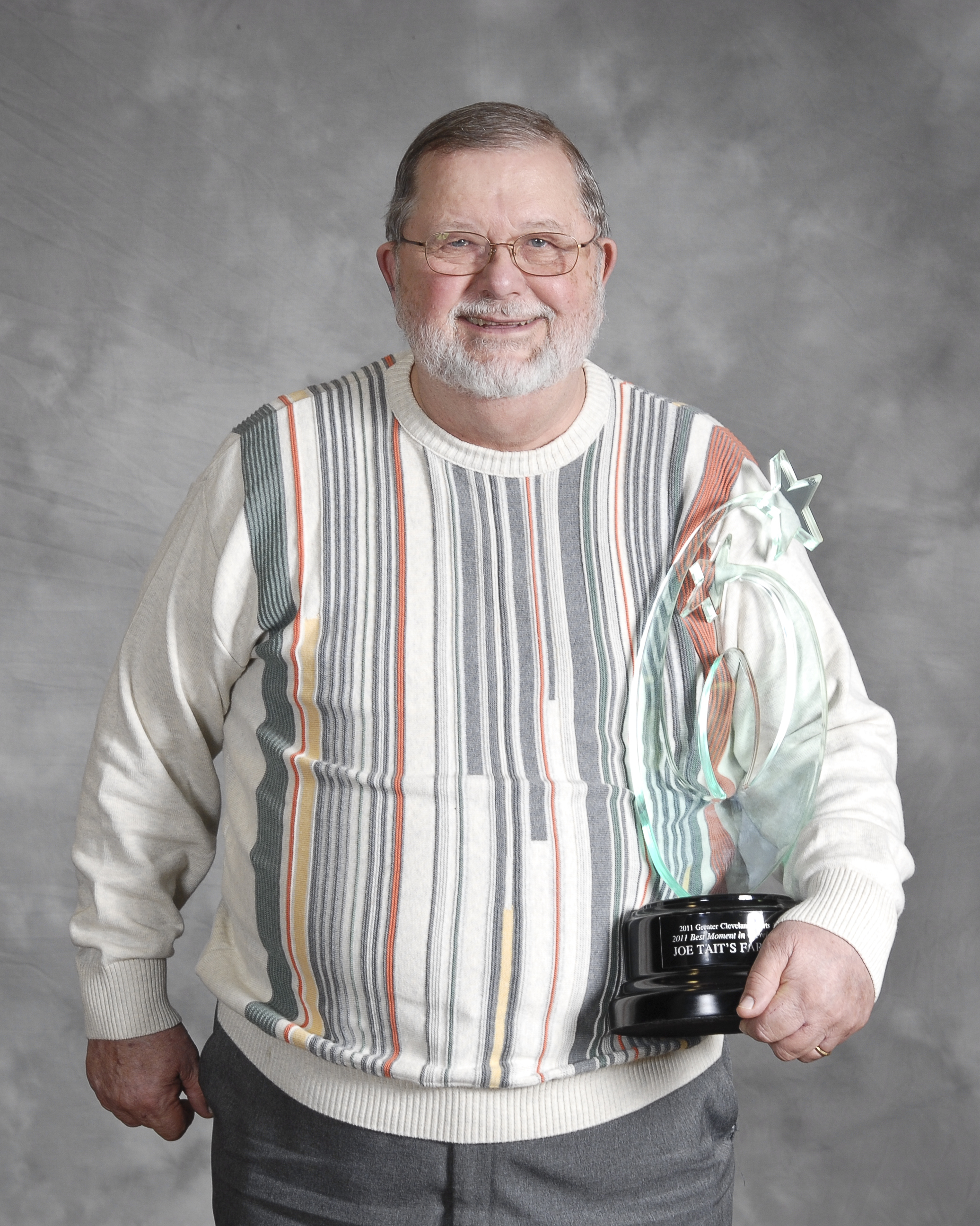
Curt Gowdy Award winner Joe Tait, who spent 39 seasons as the Cavs radio voice.

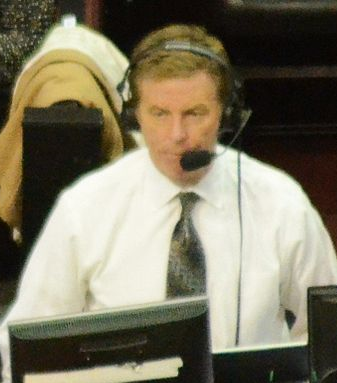
Fred McLeod, lead television play-by-play voice from 2006 until 2019

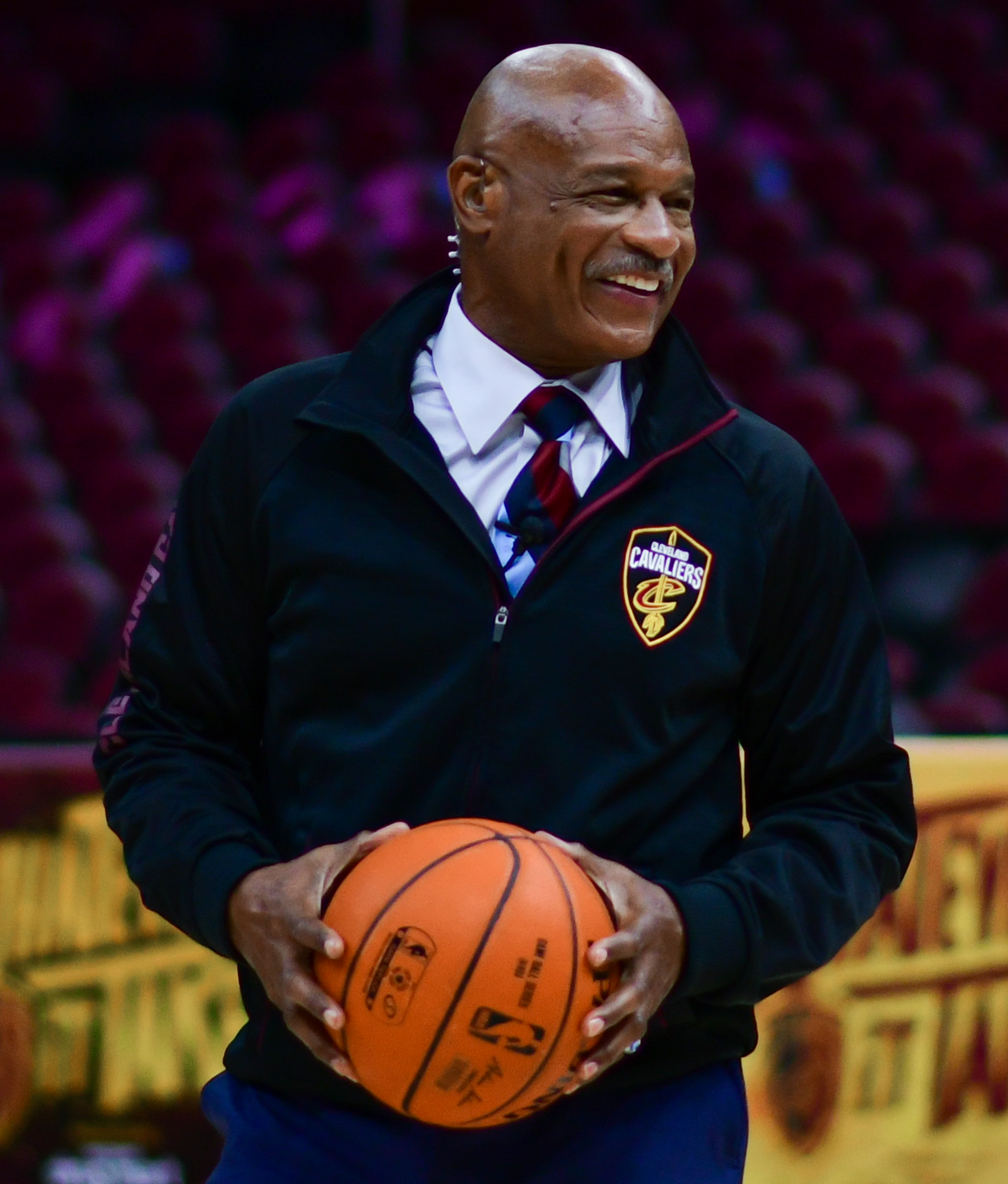
Former Cavs All-Star guard and longtime TV analyst Austin Carr

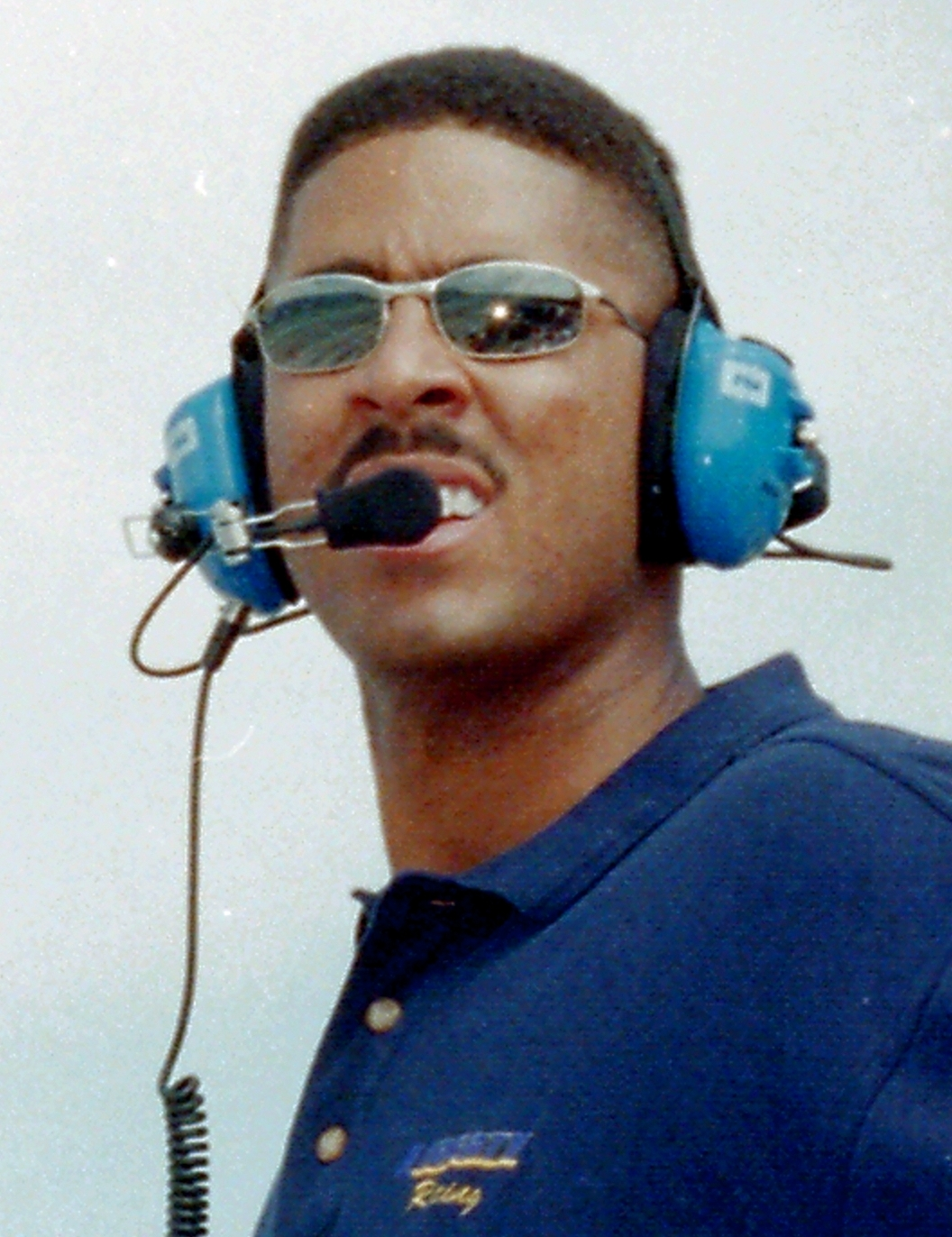
Former Cavs All-Star center and current TV analyst Brad Daugherty

== Television ==
Year	Cable/SVOD	TV	Play-by-play	Commentator(s)	Sidelines	Note(s)
2026–27	DAZN	WOIO; WUAB; RESN	John Michael	Brad Daugherty	Serena Winters	
2025–26	FanDuel Sports Ohio	WUAB; RESN	John Michael	Brad Daugherty	Serena Winters	
2024–25	FanDuel Sports Ohio	WUAB; RESN	John Michael	Austin Carr; Brad Daugherty	Serena Winters	
2023–24	Bally Sports Ohio	WUAB; WTCL-LD (Spanish)	John Michael; Rafael Hernandez Brito (Spanish)	Austin Carr; Brad Daugherty	Serena Winters	
2022–23	Bally Sports Ohio	—N/a	John Michael	Rotation of; Austin Carr; Brad Daugherty; Mike Fratello	Serena Winters	
2021–22	Bally Sports Ohio	—N/a	John Michael	Austin Carr	Angel Gray; Andre Knott; Serena Winters (Note: Gray left early in the season to take a job with ESPN, was replaced by Knott on an interim basis, with Winters taking the post full time in January.)	
2020–21	Fox Sports Ohio/; Bally Sports Ohio (Note: While the season was in progress, Fox Sports Ohio changed its name to Bally Sports Ohio.)	—N/a	John Michael	Austin Carr	Angel Gray	
2019–20	Fox Sports Ohio	—N/a	John Michael	Austin Carr	Angel Gray	
2018–19	Fox Sports Ohio	—N/a	Fred McLeod	Austin Carr	Angel Gray	
2017–18	Fox Sports Ohio	WUAB	Fred McLeod	Austin Carr	Allie Clifton	
2016–17	Fox Sports Ohio	WUAB	Fred McLeod	Austin Carr	Allie Clifton	
2015–16	Fox Sports Ohio	WUAB	Fred McLeod	Austin Carr	Allie Clifton	
2014–15	Fox Sports Ohio	WUAB	Fred McLeod	Austin Carr	Allie Clifton	
2013–14	Fox Sports Ohio	WUAB	Fred McLeod	Austin Carr	Allie Clifton	
2012–13	Fox Sports Ohio	WUAB	Fred McLeod	Austin Carr	Allie Clifton	
2011–12	Fox Sports Ohio	WUAB	Fred McLeod	Austin Carr	Jeff Phelps	
2010–11	Fox Sports Ohio	WUAB	Fred McLeod	Austin Carr	Jeff Phelps	
2009–10	Fox Sports Ohio	WUAB	Fred McLeod	Austin Carr	—N/a	
2008–09	Fox Sports Ohio	WUAB	Fred McLeod	Austin Carr	—N/a	
2007–08	FSN Ohio	WUAB	Fred McLeod	Austin Carr	—N/a	
2006–07	FSN Ohio	WUAB	Fred McLeod	Austin Carr	—N/a	
2005–06	FSN Ohio	WUAB	Michael Reghi	Austin Carr; Scott Williams	—N/a	
2004–05	FSN Ohio	WUAB	Michael Reghi	Austin Carr; Mark Price	—N/a	
2003–04	FSN Ohio	WUAB	Michael Reghi	Austin Carr; Matt Guokas (Note: Austin Carr filled in for Quinn Buckner and Matt Guokas when they had NBA on NBC commitments.)	—N/a	
2002–03	FSN Ohio	WUAB	Michael Reghi	Austin Carr; Matt Guokas	—N/a	
2001–02	FSN Ohio	WUAB	Michael Reghi	Austin Carr; Matt Guokas	—N/a	
2000–01	FSN Ohio	WUAB	Michael Reghi	Austin Carr; Matt Guokas	—N/a	
1999–2000	Fox Sports Ohio	WUAB	Michael Reghi	Austin Carr; Matt Guokas	—N/a	
1998–99	Fox Sports Ohio	WUAB	Michael Reghi	Austin Carr; Matt Guokas	—N/a	
1997–98	SportsChannel Ohio	WUAB	Michael Reghi	Matt Guokas (SC); Brad Daugherty (WUAB)	—N/a	
1996–97	SportsChannel Ohio	WUAB	Michael Reghi	Jim Chones (SC); Quinn Buckner (WUAB)	—N/a	
1995–96	SportsChannel Ohio	WUAB	Michael Reghi	Jim Chones (SC); Quinn Buckner (WUAB)	—N/a	
1994–95	SportsChannel Ohio	WUAB	Michael Reghi	Jim Chones (SC); Quinn Buckner (WUAB)	—N/a	
1993–94	SportsChannel Ohio	WOIO	Denny Schreiner (Note: Jack Corrigan filled in for Denny Schreiner when Schreiner's ESPN commitments made him unavailable.)	Jim Chones	—N/a	
1992–93	SportsChannel Ohio	WOIO	Denny Schreiner (SC); Greg Gumbel (WOIO)	Jim Chones	—N/a	
1991–92	SportsChannel Ohio	WOIO	Denny Schreiner (SC); Joe Tait (WOIO)	Jim Chones	—N/a	
1990–91	SportsChannel Ohio	WOIO	Denny Schreiner (SC); Joe Tait (WOIO)	Jim Chones	—N/a	
1989–90	SportsChannel Ohio	WOIO	Denny Schreiner (SC); Joe Tait (WOIO)	Jim Chones	—N/a	
1988–89	—N/a	WOIO	Joe Tait	Jim Chones	—N/a	
1987–88	—N/a	WUAB	Jack Corrigan	Jim Chones	—N/a	
1986–87	—N/a	WUAB	Jim Brinson; Jack Corrigan	—N/a	—N/a	
1985–86	—N/a	WUAB	Jim Brinson; Jack Corrigan	—N/a	—N/a	
1984–85	—N/a	WUAB	Nev Chandler; Jack Corrigan	—N/a	—N/a	
1983–84	Sports Ex	WUAB	Nev Chandler	Austin Carr	—N/a	
1982–83	Ten TV (Note: Games were carried over Preview, a subscription television service hosted by WCLQ-TV (channel 61).)	WUAB	Nev Chandler	Austin Carr	—N/a	
1981–82	—N/a	WUAB	Bruce Drennan	—N/a	—N/a	
1980–81	—N/a	WUAB	Bruce Drennan	—N/a	—N/a	
1979–80	—N/a	WJKW	Fred McLeod; Jim Mueller	—N/a	—N/a	
1978–79	—N/a	WJKW	Harry Jones; Jim Mueller	—N/a	—N/a	
1977–78	—N/a	WJKW (Note: WJW-TV became WJKW in 1977, back to WJW-TV in 1985 and WJW in 1998.)	Harry Jones; Jim Mueller	—N/a	—N/a	
1976–77	—N/a	WJW-TV	Harry Jones; Jim Mueller	—N/a	—N/a	
1975–76	No games carried on local television					
1974–75	—N/a	WUAB	Joe Tait; Jerry Healey; Jim Lessig	—N/a	—N/a	
1973–74	—N/a	WUAB	Joe Tait	—N/a	—N/a	
1972–73	—N/a	WUAB	Frank Sweeney	—N/a	—N/a	
1971–72	—N/a	WEWS-TV	Gib Shanley; Hal Lebovitz	—N/a	—N/a	
1970–71	—N/a	WEWS-TV	Gib Shanley; Hal Lebovitz; Bob Brown	—N/a	—N/a	

== Radio ==
Year	Radio	Play-by-play	Commentator	Studio	Spanish Radio	Spanish play-by-play	Note(s)
2026–27	WTAM; WMMS	Tim Alcorn	—N/a	Mike Snyder; Brad Sellers	WJMO (home games)	Rafael Hernandez Brito	
2025–26	WTAM; WMMS	Tim Alcorn	Jim Chones	Mike Snyder; Brad Sellers	WJMO (home games)	Rafael Hernandez Brito	
2024–25	WTAM; WMMS	Tim Alcorn	Jim Chones	Mike Snyder; Brad Sellers	Cavs App (online)	Rafael Hernandez Brito	
2023–24	WTAM; WMMS	Tim Alcorn	Jim Chones	Mike Snyder; Brad Sellers	WNZN	Rafael Hernandez Brito	
2023–22	WTAM; WMMS	Tim Alcorn	Jim Chones	Mike Snyder; Brad Sellers	WNZN	Rafael Hernandez Brito	
2021–22	WTAM; WMMS	Tim Alcorn	Jim Chones	Mike Snyder; Brad Sellers	WNZN	Rafael Hernandez Brito	
2020–21	WTAM; WMMS	Tim Alcorn	Jim Chones	Mike Snyder; Brad Sellers	WNZN	Rafael Hernandez Brito	
2019–20	WTAM; WMMS	Tim Alcorn	Jim Chones	Mike Snyder; Brad Sellers	WLFM-LP (Note: WLFM-LP was licensed as a low-power television station on channel 6, whose aural analog signal was receivable on 87.7 FM and operated as a conventional radio station. WLFM-LP converted to digital television broadcasting in 2020 and now operates as Telemundo affiliate WTCL-LD.)	Rafael Hernandez Brito	
2018–19	WTAM; WMMS	John Michael	Jim Chones	Mike Snyder; Brad Sellers	WLFM-LP	Rafael Hernandez Brito	
2017–18	WTAM; WMMS	John Michael	Jim Chones	Mike Snyder; Brad Sellers	WLFM-LP	Rafael Hernandez Brito	
2016–17	WTAM; WMMS	John Michael	Jim Chones	Mike Snyder; Brad Sellers	WLFM-LP	Rafael Hernandez Brito	
2015–16	WTAM; WMMS	John Michael	Jim Chones	Mike Snyder; Brad Sellers	WLFM-LP	Rafael Hernandez Brito	
2014–15	WTAM; WMMS	John Michael	Jim Chones	Mike Snyder; Brad Sellers	WLFM-LP	Rafael Hernandez Brito	
2013–14	WTAM	John Michael	Jim Chones	Mike Snyder; Brad Sellers	—N/a	—N/a	
2012–13	WTAM	John Michael	Jim Chones	Mike Snyder; Brad Sellers	—N/a	—N/a	
2011–12	WTAM	John Michael	Jim Chones	Mike Snyder; Brad Sellers	—N/a	—N/a	
2010–11	WTAM	Joe Tait; Mike Snyder (fill-in)	Jim Chones	Mike Snyder; Brad Sellers	—N/a	—N/a	
2009–10	WTAM	Joe Tait	—N/a	Mike Snyder	—N/a	—N/a	
2008–09	WTAM	Joe Tait	—N/a	Mike Snyder	—N/a	—N/a	
2007–08	WTAM	Joe Tait	—N/a	Mike Snyder	—N/a	—N/a	
2006–07	WTAM	Joe Tait	—N/a	Mike Snyder	—N/a	—N/a	
2005–06	WTAM	Joe Tait	—N/a	Mike Snyder	—N/a	—N/a	
2004–05	WTAM	Joe Tait	—N/a	Mike Snyder	—N/a	—N/a	
2003–04	WTAM	Joe Tait	—N/a	Mike Snyder	—N/a	—N/a	
2002–03	WTAM	Joe Tait	—N/a	Mike Snyder	—N/a	—N/a	
2001–02	WTAM	Joe Tait	—N/a	Mike Snyder	—N/a	—N/a	
2000–01	WTAM	Joe Tait	—N/a	Mike Snyder	—N/a	—N/a	
1999–2000	WTAM	Joe Tait	—N/a	Mike Snyder	—N/a	—N/a	
1998–99	WTAM	Joe Tait	—N/a	Mike Snyder	—N/a	—N/a	
1997–98	WTAM	Joe Tait	—N/a	Mike Snyder	—N/a	—N/a	
1996–97	WTAM (Note: WWWE became WTAM on July 30, 1996.)	Joe Tait	—N/a	Mike Snyder	—N/a	—N/a	
1995–96	WWWE	Joe Tait	—N/a	Mike Snyder	—N/a	—N/a	
1994–95	WWWE	Joe Tait	—N/a	Mike Snyder	—N/a	—N/a	
1993–94	WWWE	Joe Tait	—N/a	Mike Snyder	—N/a	—N/a	
1992–93	WWWE	Joe Tait	—N/a	Mike Snyder	—N/a	—N/a	
1991–92	WWWE	Joe Tait; Jim Johnson (Note: Jim Johnson broadcast Cavaliers games on radio when Joe Tait was broadcasting games on WOIO.)	—N/a	—N/a	—N/a	—N/a	
1990–91	WWWE	Joe Tait; Jim Johnson	—N/a	—N/a	—N/a	—N/a	
1989–90	WRMR (Note: WRMR became WKNR in 2001.)	Joe Tait; Jim Johnson	—N/a	—N/a	—N/a	—N/a	
1988–89	WRMR	Joe Tait; Howard Kellman	—N/a	—N/a	—N/a	—N/a	
1987–88	WWWE	Joe Tait	—N/a	—N/a	—N/a	—N/a	
1986–87	WWWE	Joe Tait	—N/a	—N/a	—N/a	—N/a	
1985–86	WWWE	Joe Tait	—N/a	—N/a	—N/a	—N/a	
1984–85	WWWE	Joe Tait	—N/a	—N/a	—N/a	—N/a	
1983–84	WBBG (Note: WBBG became WMJI in 1987, WRDZ in 1988, WMIH in 1995, WWMK in 1998 and WCCR in 2015.)	Joe Tait	—N/a	—N/a	—N/a	—N/a	
1982–83	WBBG	Paul Porter	—N/a	—N/a	—N/a	—N/a	
1981–82	WBBG	Paul Porter	—N/a	—N/a	—N/a	—N/a	
1980–81	WWWE	Joe Tait	—N/a	—N/a	—N/a	—N/a	
1979–80	WWWE	Joe Tait	—N/a	—N/a	—N/a	—N/a	
1978–79	WWWE	Joe Tait	—N/a	—N/a	—N/a	—N/a	
1977–78	WWWE	Joe Tait	—N/a	—N/a	—N/a	—N/a	
1976–77	WWWE	Joe Tait	—N/a	—N/a	—N/a	—N/a	
1975–76	WWWE	Joe Tait	—N/a	—N/a	—N/a	—N/a	
1974–75	WWWE	Joe Tait	—N/a	—N/a	—N/a	—N/a	
1973–74	WWWE	Joe Tait	—N/a	—N/a	—N/a	—N/a	
1972–73	WKYC/; WWWE (Note: WKYC became WWWE on November 16, 1972.)	Joe Tait	—N/a	—N/a	—N/a	—N/a	
1971–72	WERE (Note: WERE became WJMO in 2007.)	Joe Tait	—N/a	—N/a	—N/a	—N/a	
1970–71	WERE	Joe Tait (Note: Team executive Bob Brown called the first eight games of the 1970–71 season on the radio before the team hired Joe Tait.)	—N/a	—N/a	—N/a	—N/a	

== See also ==
- List of current National Basketball Association broadcasters
