= Matt Pinto =

American sportscaster

Matt Pinto is a veteran NBA play-by-play announcer who has been with the Oklahoma City Thunder since 2007.

From 1990 to 1997, Pinto was the radio play-by-play voice of the NBA's Charlotte Hornets, where he was recognized in 1992 as the Premier Sportscaster in North Carolina by the Charlotte Observer. Pinto was also the television play-by-play voice of University of North Carolina-Charlotte basketball games.

From 1997 to 2005, Pinto was on the Dallas Mavericks’ broadcast team, serving as the radio play-by-play voice from 1997 to 2001 and the television voice from 2001 to 2005. He also served as the play-by-play announcer of the NCAA Division I-AA regional game of the week for The Football Network. In 1997, Pinto was named best play-by-play announcer for the state of Texas by the Associated Press.

Pinto served as the radio voice of the Los Angeles Clippers for two seasons before joining the Seattle SuperSonics broadcasting team. He remained with the franchise when it became the Oklahoma City Thunder.

Before joining the NBA ranks, Pinto worked in the sports broadcasting field in Honolulu, Boston, Los Angeles and Amarillo, Texas.

He has also served as the radio voice of University of Hawaiʻi men's sports, Boston College basketball, Brown University football, Hawaii Islanders and Pawtucket Red Sox AAA baseball. He also served as television sports anchor on CBS-TV affiliate KGMB-TV in Honolulu, Hawaii, for three years.

A graduate of San Dieguito High School in Encinitas, Pinto also served as the play-by-play voice for UCLA women's basketball in 1984.
