= Steve Martin (sportscaster) =

American sportscaster

- Born: August 14, 1952 (age 74); Millinocket, Maine
- Sports commentary career
- Teams: Davidson Wildcats, Charlotte Hornets, New Orleans Hornets, Charlotte Bobcats
- Genre: Play-by-play
- Sport: Basketball

Steve Martin (born August 14, 1952, in Millinocket, Maine) is a sportscaster, calling primarily college football and both pro and college basketball. He studied political science and history at the University of Maine. He has called Atlantic Coast Conference basketball and football. On the professional side, he has served as a broadcaster for the Charlotte Hornets, New Orleans Hornets and Charlotte Bobcats. He was also the voice of the Davidson College Wildcats on WBT-1110 from 1982 to 1987. On February 27, 2018, the Charlotte Hornets announced that Martin would be retiring at the conclusion of the 2017-18 NBA season.
