= Gil McGregor =

American basketball player (born 1949)

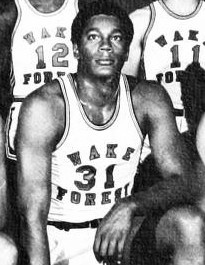
- McGregor, circa 1970

Personal information
- Born: June 14, 1949 (age 77)
- Listed height: 6 ft 8 in (2.03 m)
- Listed weight: 240 lb (109 kg)

Career information
- High school: Hoke County (Raeford, North Carolina)
- College: Wake Forest (1968–1971)
- NBA draft: 1971: 6th round, 89th overall pick
- Drafted by: Cincinnati Royals
- Position: Power forward
- Number: 25

Career history
- 1971–1972: Cincinnati Royals
- 1972–1973: Wilkes-Barre Barons

Career highlights
- CBA champion (1973)
- Stats at NBA.com
- Stats at Basketball Reference

Gilbert Ray McGregor (born June 14, 1949) is an American former professional basketball player. He played in the National Basketball Association for the Cincinnati Royals during the 1971–72 season.

== Broadcasting career ==
McGregor was a sportscaster for the Charlotte Hornets and New Orleans Hornets.

== Career statistics ==
Legend
GP	Games played	GS	Games started	MPG	Minutes per game
FG%	Field goal percentage	3P%	3-point field goal percentage	FT%	Free throw percentage
RPG	Rebounds per game	APG	Assists per game	SPG	Steals per game
BPG	Blocks per game	PPG	Points per game	**Bold**	Career high

=== NBA ===
==== Regular season ====
Year	Team	GP	MPG	FG%	FT%	RPG	APG	PPG
1971–72	Cincinnati	42	12.7	.363	.696	3.5	.4	4.1
