= Eddie Doucette =

American sports announcer (born 1940)

- Born: June 15, 1940 (age 86)
- Education: Michigan State University (BA)
- Occupation: Sportscaster
- Website: http://www.eddiedoucette.com/

Eddie Doucette (born June 15, 1940) is a former television and radio sportscaster and currently the president of Doucette Promotions Inc.

Doucette was the original radio play-by-play voice of the Milwaukee Bucks, where he broadcast games for 16 years. During his career he also called games for The NBA on CBS & various other NBA teams (including the Indiana Pacers, Denver Nuggets, Los Angeles Clippers and Portland Trail Blazers), for Major League Baseball teams (including the San Diego Padres, Cleveland Indians, Houston Astros, Los Angeles Dodgers and Milwaukee Brewers), and for the WFL's Chicago Fire; and he has done various other sports including NFL football, college football, college basketball, PGA Tour golf, boxing, bowling and track and field events.

Along with Jon McGlocklin, Doucette co-founded the MACC Fund in 1976 after his two-year-old son, Brett, was diagnosed with cancer. Today, he serves as the fund's honorary vice-president.

He is a graduate of Evanston Township High School where he has been honored as a Distinguished Alumni and Michigan State University in 1960 with a Bachelor's degree in Business. He resides in Poway, California with his wife Karen. They have two grown sons: Brett and Cory.

Eddie is known for coining the term "skyhook" when Kareem Abdul-Jabbar shot the ball on May 10, 1974, at Boston Garden in Game 6 of the NBA Finals between the Bucks and Celtics. He also gave a signature call of "Bango!" whenever a Bucks player would make a long-distance shot. Doucette's "Bango" call was also used by his successor, Ted Davis, and is also the name of the Bucks' mascot.

Doucette received the Curt Gowdy Media Award in the Electronic Media category from the Naismith Memorial Basketball Hall of Fame in 2013. He was inducted into the Wisconsin Broadcasters Association Hall of Fame in 2011.
