= NBA on television in the 1980s =

As the national broadcaster of the NBA, CBS aired NBA games from the 1973–74 until the 1989–90 season, during which the early 1980s is notoriously known as the tape delay playoff era.

NBA entered the cable territory in 1979 when USA Network signed a three-year $1.5 million deal and extended for two years until the 1983–84 season, ESPN also had a brief affair with NBA from 1982 to 1984. Turner Sports obtained rights to air NBA games beginning with the 1984–85 season (replacing ESPN and USA Network as national cable partners) under a four-year deal, in which TBS shared the NBA television package along with CBS. In the summer of 1987, Turner Broadcasting System signed a new joint broadcast contract between TBS and TNT to split broadcast NBA games starting from the 1988–89 season. TNT held rights to broadcast the NBA draft, most NBA regular season and playoff games, while TBS only aired single games or doubleheaders once a week.

== Year-by-year summary ==
=== 1980 ===
By the 1979–1980 season, the network's NBA ratings had bottomed, with a regular season rating for the broadcasts at 6.4. By this time, the network had eliminated its regional coverage and only used two play-by-play announcers (Brent Musburger and Gary Bender) and three color commentators (Bill Russell and Rod Hundley, who teamed with Musburger and Rick Barry, who teamed with Bender); CBS felt that showing an NBA Finals game was not worth pre-empting their Friday night lineup (the smash hit Dallas in particular) during May sweeps (although the iconic episode in which J.R. Ewing was shot aired on March 21, 1980, and Dallas was already in summer reruns). The consensus was that a basketball game in prime time would have drawn fewer viewers. As a result, CBS used to regularly run NBA games in the 11:30 p.m. time slot (then occupied by The CBS Late Movie). For the 1980 and 1981 NBA Finals, CBS scheduled Games 3 and 4 on back-to-back days (Saturday and Sunday) to avoid an extra tape delay game.

In 1980, the 26 share from 1976 had fallen to 18%. Ratings fell to a level where, as mentioned before, CBS began airing games on tape delay. The 1981 NBA Finals set the standard for futility, with an average rating of 6.7, the lowest in NBA history until the 2003 NBA Finals averaged a 6.5 on ABC.

When it came time for CBS to broadcast Game 6 of the 1980 Finals (on Friday, May 16), the network gave its affiliates the option of either airing the game live or on tape delay (in fact, WAGA-TV in Atlanta did not carry the NBA on CBS for numerous years). If the affiliate chose to air the game later that night, then the prime time schedule would consist of reruns of The Incredible Hulk, The Dukes of Hazzard and Dallas (CBS, NBC and ABC ended the 1979–80 seasons in late March and early April in anticipation of a strike by the Screen Actors Guild, which came to fruition in July 1980). The clinching Game 6 of the 1980 Finals between the Los Angeles Lakers and Philadelphia 76ers was, most notably, aired live in the Philadelphia, Los Angeles, Portland and Seattle markets; CBS stations in the latter three markets were able to air the game live and still show most of the CBS prime time schedule since the game tipped at 6:00 p.m. Pacific Time. Otherwise, most CBS affiliates chose to air Game 6 on tape delay.

The reason for this scheduling dilemma was that the NBA had opted to start the regular season earlier. Starting in the mid-1970s, the NBA had pushed back the start of the regular season, resulting in it ending increasingly later (for example, April 6 in 1975, April 11 in 1976). Prior to that, the regular season had always ended in late March. For the 1979–1980 and 1980–1981 seasons, the NBA reverted to the earlier practice, with the season ending respectively on March 30, 1980, and March 29, 1981 (both falling on a Sunday). That meant that the Finals in those years began in the first week of May rather than the end of May, and as a result, the weeknight games were played during May ratings sweeps. Consequently, weeknight games held on the West Coast started at 8:30 p.m. Pacific Time, which was 11:30 p.m. in the Eastern Time Zone; those games could be shown live. However, non-West Coast weeknight games required tape-delay, to be shown at 11:30 p.m.

- 1980 NBA Finals: The series-deciding Game 6 became the most notorious example of CBS's practice of showing even the most important NBA games on "tape delay" broadcasts. Because May 16, 1980 was a Friday, the network did not want to preempt two of its highest-rated shows, The Dukes of Hazzard and Dallas, even though both shows were already in reruns: the 1979–80 TV season had ended early, back in March, in anticipation of a strike that summer by the Screen Actors Guild. So Game 6 was shown at 11:30pm Eastern (10:30pm Central) in all but four US cities: Los Angeles, Philadelphia, Portland and Seattle, who carried it live. The game was not broadcast at all in Atlanta. (This is often cited as an example of TV's lack of interest in the NBA in the "pre-Magic and Bird" era.)
  - On a side note, here, in Game 4 of the 1980 Finals, Julius Erving executed the "Baseline Move", a behind-the-board reverse layup that seemed to defy gravity. Play-by-play announcer Brent Musburger has noted that Erving made such moves almost routine in his ABA days—but the ABA had no national TV contract in those days. This Game 4 move, played to a national audience in a title game, has likely become Julius Erving's most famous move.

=== 1981 ===
In 1980, USA televised two NBA games on Christmas Day. Jim Karvellas and Richie Powers called the early game involving New Jersey at Washington. Meanwhile, Eddie Doucette and Steve Jones called the late game involving Golden State at Portland.

The 1980–1981 season was arguably the rock bottom point of the tape delay era for CBS. CBS aired four of the six Finals games on tape delay and six of nine during the Conference finals. Just like the previous year, CBS scheduled Games 3 and 4 of the NBA Finals without an off-day to avoid yet another tape delayed game. CBS wanted the Pacific teams to advance in the playoffs so that they could show live games at 11:30 p.m. on the Eastern U.S.; however, the Los Angeles Lakers and Portland Trail Blazers were upset in Round 1, while the Phoenix Suns were upset in Round 2. This left two teams located in the Central Time Zone, the Houston Rockets and Kansas City Kings, to play in the Western Conference finals.

Between 1981 and 1983, ratings for CBS' NBA telecasts rose by 12%. CBS' highest-rated NBA game (and the only NBA game that scored more than 20 ratings points for the network) was Game 7 of the 1988 NBA Finals between the Lakers and the Detroit Pistons. By the end of its coverage, CBS' NBA ratings had been mostly respectable, with the lowest-rated Final after 1982 scoring a 12.3 (three times), a mark higher than any NBA Final since 1998.

- From 1979–1981, CBS aired weekday NBA Finals games on tape delay if they were not played on the West Coast. Games were televised after the late local news (11:30 p.m.) in the CBS Late Movie time slot. In some cases, games were seen live in the cities whose local NBA teams were playing. In 1981 for example, WNAC-TV Boston and KHOU-TV Houston carried Games 1, 2, 5 and 6 live, although most viewers around the country had to wait until after the late local news to see them.
  - 1981: The series between the Boston Celtics and the Houston Rockets was the lowest rated NBA Finals in history (6.7 rating over six games), until the 2003 NBA Finals drew only 6.5 percent of American television households. Four games of the 1981 series (Games 1, 2, 5 and the climatic Game 6) were telecast on tape delay outside of Boston and Houston.
    - As previously mentioned, before 2003, the 1981 NBA Finals received the lowest television rating in NBA history. The 1981 Finals drew a 6.7 rating, according to Nielsen Media Research. Meanwhile, the 2003 Finals between the San Antonio Spurs and New Jersey Nets drew a 6.5 rating. Due to this, the 1981 Finals were the last to be broadcast on tape-delay, with weeknight games airing after the late local news in most cities. Games 3 and 4 were played back-to-back on Saturday and Sunday, May 9 and 10, to give CBS two live Finals games. Following the Finals, Gary Bender was relegated to tertiary play-by-play for the rest of his tenure in CBS, while Rick Barry's contract, following his questionable racial comments about Bill Russell during the Finals, was not renewed. Russell would remain the main color analyst for the next two years alongside newly promoted main play-by-play commentator Dick Stockton. Curiously, Barry and Russell would reunite, this time on the NBA on TBS during the mid-1980s. Russell was replaced as CBS' lead analyst following the 1983 Finals by former Celtics teammate Tom Heinsohn.

=== 1982 ===
During the 1981–82 season, Al Albert and Hubie Brown called the early game on USA while Eddie Doucette and Steve "Snapper" Jones called the late game. Hubie Brown was subsequently replaced by Jon McGlocklin as Al Albert's partner.

Greg Gumbel and John Andariese were some of the voices of the original telecasts of The NBA on ESPN, which lasted only two seasons. Tom Mees was among the studio hosts. During a commercial break of a game at Madison Square Garden, the announcers (Greg Gumbel and Chris Berman) danced to the song "Little Darling" that was played on the public address system of the arena. That blooper reel is still often played when ESPN celebrates a milestone.

Other announcers during this period included:

- Irv Brown (game analyst)
- Ken Charles (game analyst)
- Jim Simpson (play-by-play)
- Roger Twibell (play-by-play)
- Dick Vitale (game analyst)
- Fred White (play-by-play)
- Geoff Witcher (play-by-play)

The '82 Finals marked the first time since 1978 that all of the games aired live in its entirely. As a compromise between CBS and the NBA, the season returned to late October after starting it in early October the previous two seasons, meaning that the championship series started after the conclusion of May sweeps. Also, Brent Musburger served as anchor for Game 1 in Philadelphia, but had to anchor Games 2 and 3 from New York, because he hosted CBS Sports Sunday. So anchoring the coverage in Musburger's absence were Frank Glieber (Games 2–4) and Pat O'Brien (Game 5).

=== 1983 ===
In the 1982–83 season, CBS significantly reduced the number of regular season broadcasts from 18 to four. The rationale was that cable television networks (namely, the USA Network and ESPN) were carrying a large number of regular season games (at least 40 each). In return, CBS executives believed that the public was being oversaturated with NBA coverage.

- 1983 NBA Finals: CBS joined Game 1 in progress with 7:37 left in the first period (meaning, there was no standard pregame coverage). Following the introduction montage (which was notable as it marked premiere of the intercutting, Bill Feigenbaum created CGI rendering of Boston Garden, used by CBS through the start of the 1989 Finals) with narration by anchor Brent Musburger, things were quickly passed off to play-by-play man Dick Stockton.

=== 1984 ===
For the 1983–84 season, CBS would televise just ten (out of 170 nationally) regular season games. Meanwhile, CBS televised about 16 playoff games.

Popular belief holds that the peak era of the NBA on CBS occurred from 1984 to 1987. During this period, CBS' NBA coverage was the beneficiary of a new era in the league that would forever link two of the game's greatest players, Larry Bird and Magic Johnson. Bird and Johnson entered the NBA (coming off playing against each other in the highest-rated NCAA Men's Division I Basketball Championship of all time), respectively playing for the Boston Celtics and Los Angeles Lakers. The Lakers and Celtics, two iconic teams in large television markets, rose to prominence during the period; many credit the theatrics of Bird and Johnson to boosting the overall popularity of the NBA (especially during the tape delay era of NBA telecasts). Within three years of Johnson and Bird entering the league, the NBA had a Game of the Week on CBS, and ratings for Finals games approached levels rivaling those of the World Series.

Prior to the Bird/Magic era, CBS used to televise approximately five to seven games regionally per week in a doubleheader format (1:45 and 4:00 p.m. Eastern Time) on Sundays. Ratings for regional were far outdrawn by NBC's college basketball coverage and ABC's Superstars program. After ratings bottomed out in 1980 and 1981, coinciding with CBS airing tape-delayed coverage, the network decided to scrap the regional telecasts. In its place CBS sold the marquee players and teams (for example, "Julius Erving and the Philadelphia 76ers", "Larry Bird and the Boston Celtics" or "Magic Johnson and the Los Angeles Lakers") for a "Game of the Week" broadcast.

In 1984, CBS Sports' Lesley Visser (the then wife of lead NBA on CBS play-by-play announcer Dick Stockton) became the first woman to cover an NBA Finals.

- 1984: The 1984 championship series was the most watched in NBA history, with soaring TV ratings.

=== 1985 ===
As previously mentioned, TBS obtained rights to air NBA games beginning with the 1984–1985 season (replacing the ESPN and USA Network as the National Basketball Association's national cable partners) in which TBS shared the NBA television package along with CBS.

When it began to televise games from NBA teams other than the Atlanta Hawks, TBS maintained a package of approximately 55 regular season NBA games annually on Tuesday and Friday nights. TBS also carried numerous NBA Playoff games as well as the NBA draft from 1985–1989.

On May 12, 1985, during halftime of the Boston Celtics–Philadelphia 76ers playoff game, CBS televised the first ever NBA draft lottery.

=== 1986 ===
Beginning in 1986, TBS televised the various contests from the NBA All-Star Weekend. In 1987, the slam dunk contest was televised live for the very first time on the network.

1986 was the last time CBS ever aired an NBA playoff game on tape delay, Game 3 of the Western Conference finals between the Los Angeles Lakers and Houston Rockets, which was held on May 16 of that year. The game aired at 11:30 p.m. Eastern Time following a 9:30 p.m. tip. Also in 1986, CBS provided regional coverage of the Eastern Conference and Western Conference finals games on May 18. As previously mentioned, this was the last time that any NBA Conference finals game was not nationally televised.

Game 3 of the 1986 NBA Finals in Houston was played during the midst of an electrical storm that knocked the picture out for approximately the first six minutes of the fourth quarter. Although the video was already on the fritz towards the end of the third, CBS announcer Dick Stockton waited for nearly three minutes before adjusting to a radio play-by-play.

=== 1987 ===
In 1987, CBS provided prime time coverage for Game 6 of the Eastern Conference finals, marking the network's first pre-Finals prime time playoff telecast since 1975. CBS was able to do this because the NBA decided to push the Finals back from late May until early June. With the Finals starting a week later, the awkward long pauses between Games 1 and 2 were no longer required. Because of this, instead of Game 2 of the Finals being shown on the first night after sweeps ended, CBS could show Game 6 of the conference finals.

Also in 1987, the NBA Finals hit a then-record rating of 15.9. James Brown was the sideline reporter for Games 3 and 4 (the latter being the Magic junior skyhook game) of the Finals because Pat O'Brien attended the birth of his son Sean Patrick. O'Brien called Games 1, 2, 5 and 6.

In the summer of 1987, the Turner Broadcasting System signed a new joint broadcast contract between TBS and TNT effective with the 1988–89 NBA season; beginning that season, TBS and TNT split broadcast rights to televise NBA games. TNT held rights to broadcast the NBA Draft and most NBA regular season and playoff games, while TBS only aired single games or double-headers once a week.

- 1987 NBA Finals: James Brown was the sideline reporter for Games 3 and 4 (the latter being the Magic junior skyhook game) because Pat O'Brien attended the birth of son Sean Patrick. O'Brien called Games 1, 2, 5 and 6.
  - In 1987, the NBA Finals hit a then-record rating of 15.9. The 1990 NBA Finals was CBS' last, after nearly two decades televising the NBA. While the network broadcast every Bird-Magic Finals, it never broadcast any Final involving Michael Jordan, who, starting the year after CBS ended involvement with the league, would dominate the NBA in a way that neither Bird nor Magic had. In 1990, the final year of the CBS deal, the regular season rating stood at a 5.2. (Each rating point represents 931,000 households.)

=== 1988 ===
- In 1988 NBA Finals, CBS achieved its only 20+ rating for an individual NBA game when the network got a 21.2 rating for Game 7 of the 1988 NBA Finals between the Lakers and Detroit Pistons. The Pistons would be in the next two NBA Finals, including a sweep the next year, and the lowest ratings CBS had seen in six years the year after that, with a 12.3 in 1990.

=== 1989 ===
By the late 1980s, CBS was telecasting 15 or 16 regular season games per year. In 1989 alone, only 13 of the 24 playoff games (Games 1–3, specifically) in Round 1 aired on TBS or CBS (for example, none of the four games from the Seattle–Houston first round series appeared on national television). Notably, Game 5 of the 1989 playoff series between the Chicago Bulls and Cleveland Cavaliers (featuring Michael Jordan's now famous game winning, last second shot over Craig Ehlo) was not nationally televised. CBS affiliates in Virginia elected to show the first game of a second round series between Seattle and the Lakers.

Meanwhile, many CBS affiliates on the West Coast (such as KCBS-TV in Los Angeles and KPIX-TV in San Francisco) were able to broadcast at least a portion of the Chicago-Cleveland game. In Los Angeles, the hometown Lakers finished their game (started at the same time as the Chicago-Cleveland game) just in time for CBS to switch to the Chicago-Cleveland game, where, as it happened, Jordan made his game winner. The Portland Oregonian criticized CBS for its decision to show the Game 1 of the second round Seattle-Lakers series in Portland on KOIN rather than that game. Furthermore, CBS only broadcast the fifth game of the first-round series between Atlanta and Milwaukee nationally. The nationally televised Atlanta-Milwaukee game aired at 1:00 p.m. Eastern Time, while the regionally televised Chicago-Cleveland and Seattle/L.A. Lakers games aired at 3:30 p.m. Eastern Time.

Perhaps even more confusing, both Game 5 sites (Coliseum at Richfield in Cleveland and Omni Coliseum in Atlanta) were in the Eastern Time Zone, so differing local start times were not a factor. Previously, CBS aired Game 2 of the Chicago-Cleveland series nationally, while relegating Game 2 of the Atlanta-Milwaukee series to TBS. CBS used its primary announcing team, Dick Stockton and Hubie Brown to call the latter game.

- 1989 NBA Finals: Pat O'Brien was the pre-game and halftime host for Game 2 because Brent Musburger was on assignment (Musburger was covering the College World Series for CBS). This was also in the case in 1988. This was Musburger's last NBA Finals assignment for CBS, as he was fired on April 1, 1990, months before NBA's television contract with CBS expired. Musburger moved to ABC and ESPN and later called nine NBA Finals series for ESPN Radio between 1996 and 2004.

== See also ==
- List of NBA Finals broadcasters#1980s
- List of NBA All-Star Game broadcasters#1980s
- List of NBA on ESPN broadcasters
- NBA on television in the 1950s
- NBA on television in the 1960s
- NBA on television in the 1970s
- NBA on television in the 1990s
- NBA on television in the 2000s
- NBA on television in the 2010s
