= NBA on television in the 2000s =

As the national broadcaster of the NBA, CBS aired NBA games from the 1973–74 until the 1989–90 season, during which the early 1980s is notoriously known as the tape delay playoff era.

NBC then succeeded the broadcast rights from 1990 to 2002. During NBC's partnership with the NBA in the 1990s, the league rose to unprecedented popularity, with ratings surpassing the days of Magic Johnson and Larry Bird in the mid-1980s. Upon expiration of the contract in 2002, the league signed an agreement with ABC, which began airing games in the 2002–03 season. NBC had made a four-year $1.3 billion ($330 million/year) bid in the spring of 2002 to renew its NBA rights, but the league instead went to ESPN and ABC with a six-year deal worth $2.4 billion ($400 million/year), a total of $4.6 billion ($766 million/year) when adding the cable deal with Turner Sports. Partially due to the retirement of Michael Jordan, the league suffered ratings decline after ESPN and ABC took over the rights. The NBA extended its national TV package on June 27, 2007, worth eight-year $7.4 billion ($930 million/year) through the 2015–16 season, during which the league had its new resurgence led by a renewed Celtics–Lakers rivalry featuring Kobe Bryant and the dominance of LeBron James.

The 2001–02 season would mark the final year of regular NBA coverage on TBS, Turner Sports signed a new NBA television contract in which TNT would assume rights to the company's NBA package while TBS would discontinue game coverage altogether.

== Year-by-year summary ==
=== 2000 ===
For the 1999–2000 NBA season, TBS shifted its primetime game telecasts from Wednesdays to Mondays. For the 2000–2001 NBA season, the broadcasts were moved to Tuesdays, while TNT assumed rights to Wednesday and Thursday evening games.

Starting in 2000, the NBA spread out telecasts of games from the Eastern Conference and Western Conference playoff series so that only two series would play on their scheduled game days (so as to avoid scheduling conflicts and ratings competition between TNT and TBS). TNT would air doubleheaders on most weekdays, while TBS would air one doubleheader each week.

=== 2001 ===
The pre-game show for NBC's NBA telecasts was NBA Showtime, a title that was used from 1990 until 2000, with the pre-game being unbranded afterward. Showtime was originally hosted by Bob Costas from the inaugural season of the 1990 contract to the 1995–96 season; Hannah Storm took over as host beginning with the 1996–97 season, who in turn was replaced by Ahmad Rashad in 2001 when Storm went on maternity leave. The video game NBA Showtime: NBA on NBC, by Midway Games, was named after the pregame show.

During the NBA Finals, additional coverage would be immediately available on CNBC, in which the panelists provided an additional half-hour of in-depth game discussions, after the NBC broadcast network's coverage concluded.

The 2000–2001 season brought to an end to Bob Costas' direct role with the NBA on NBC (although Costas would work playoff games for the next two seasons and would return to host NBC's coverage for the 2002 NBA Finals). Costas deferred to Marv Albert, allowing Albert to again be the lead broadcaster for the NBA, and stayed on only to deliver interviews and special features. On the studio front, Hannah Storm left her position as studio host to go on maternity leave, with Rashad taking over for Storm; Isiah Thomas left NBC to become coach of the Indiana Pacers. Joining Rashad were former Phoenix Suns player Kevin Johnson and former NBA coach P. J. Carlesimo. Marv Albert joined Doug Collins as the primary broadcast team, and the two broadcast the 2001 NBA Finals, which had the highest ratings for a Finals match since 1998. After the season, Collins was hired away from NBC by the Washington Wizards, which forced the network to move the longtime secondary color duo of Steve Jones and Bill Walton to the lead broadcast team with Albert.

During the 2001 NBA Finals between the Los Angeles Lakers and the Philadelphia 76ers, NBC decided to cross-promote its NBA coverage with its then-popular quiz show The Weakest Link. Two 10-minute editions of The Weakest Link aired during halftime of Games 2 and 3, featuring Bob Costas, Bill Walton and Steve Jones as contestants, along with Charlotte Hornets guard Baron Davis and WNBA team Los Angeles Sparks's center, Lisa Leslie.

In late 2001, the NBA was in the midst of putting together a new broadcast and cable television deal. At the time, conventional wisdom was that NBC would renew its existing broadcasting contract with the league. An October 5, 2001, Sports Business Daily article cited The New York Times sports columnist Richard Sandomir regarding the possibility of ESPN joining with ABC in obtaining a portion of the contract:

[it would be] difficult to imagine the NBA being so overwhelmed by an ESPN offer that it would let [ESPN] team up for a broadcast deal with ABC that would yield fewer games, promotion and exposure.

The negotiations were closely watched by those in the business world, as it was the first time that a major sports league crafted a television deal in the new economic environment since the September 11 terrorist attacks a few months before. Declining ratings for NBC's NBA game telecasts had already led some to believe that the NBA's next television rights fee would be lower than previous years, and the economic recession made that a likely scenario. As predicted, NBC's offer to the league was lower than the previous agreement's amount. Had the NBA agreed to the network's offer, it would have been the first sports league to experience a decline in rights fees. However, the NBA rejected NBC's offer and after the network's exclusive negotiating period with the league expired, ABC and ESPN stepped in. On January 22, 2002, the NBA signed a six-year deal with The Walt Disney Company and Turner Sports, which renewed an existing deal with TNT and allowed ABC and ESPN to acquire the rights to air the league's games. ABC and ESPN reportedly paid an average of about US$400 million a season. Technically, ESPN pays the NBA for its broadcast rights and "buys" time on ABC to air select games (this is noted in copyright tags during the end credits at the conclusion of the telecasts, saying "The preceding program has been paid for by ESPN, Inc.") In all, the contract allowed the NBA to increase its rights fees by 25%.

- 2001 NBA Finals: NBC studio host Hannah Storm did not anchor the NBA Finals due to her being on maternity leave, so Ahmad Rashad replaced her. She returned to cover the NBA Finals in 2002, but as post-game host.

=== 2002 ===
NBC's halftime show was sponsored by Prudential Financial (Prudential Halftime Report), and later NetZero (NetZero at the Half) and Verizon Wireless (Verizon Wireless at the Half). The broadcasts also featured a segment during the live games called Miller Genuine Moments, which provided a brief retrospective on a particular historically significant and/or dramatic moment in NBA history; this segment was discontinued towards the end of NBC's coverage. For a brief period in 2001–02, NBC aired a studio segment called 24, in which each analyst (at that time, Pat Croce, Jayson Williams or Mike Fratello) would have 24 seconds to talk about issues concerning the NBA. NBC (in conjunction with completely revamping the pregame show) discontinued the segment in February 2002, after Williams was arrested on murder charges.

The 2001–2002 season would ultimately mark TBS's final year of NBA coverage. Turner Sports signed a new NBA television contract in which TNT would assume rights to the company's NBA package, while TBS would discontinue game coverage altogether; ESPN assumed TBS's half of the league's cable television rights. During 2002, TBS aired doubleheaders every Tuesday night of the playoffs until the Conference Finals. The final NBA game ever to be regularly televised on TBS aired on May 13, 2002, when the San Antonio Spurs faced the Los Angeles Lakers in game five of the Western Semifinals. In that last game, Robert Horry hit a key three-pointer that won the series four games to one for the Lakers to move on to the Western Conference Finals.

The 2001–2002 season featured several anomalies, as NBC started their coverage on the first Saturday of the season, for the first time since 1991. The reason for this was NBA legend Michael Jordan's return to playing, this time for the Washington Wizards. NBC covered an early December game featuring Jordan's Wizards as well, which marked the first time a broadcast television network aired more than one pre-Christmas NBA game since CBS in the 1980s.

That year also marked the return of Hannah Storm from maternity leave, with her and Ahmad Rashad alternating as studio hosts throughout the 2002 season. That year, NBC's studio team consisted of Rashad and Storm with former Philadelphia 76ers owner Pat Croce, the returning Mike Fratello, and former player Jayson Williams. The tandem stayed together through the 2002 NBA All-Star Game. During the week between the All-Star Game and NBC's next scheduled telecast, Williams was arrested after shooting and killing his limousine driver. He was promptly fired by NBC, which also did not return Croce or Fratello to studio coverage. Instead, the network brought in Tom Tolbert, who had only recently been added to NBC Sports as a third-string analyst paired with Mike Breen. Tolbert stayed on as the lone studio analyst through the end of the season, and won acclaim by several in the media, including USA Today sports columnist Rudy Martzke. Hannah Storm was not able to anchor the 2002 NBA All-Star Game as she was on assignment at the 2002 Winter Olympics in Salt Lake City serving as daytime studio host; Rashad solo anchored from the studio.

Two days before NBC was to begin its playoff coverage, both Marv Albert and Mike Fratello, returning from working a Philadelphia 76ers–Indiana Pacers game on TNT, were seriously injured in a limousine accident. That week, NBC juggled its announcing teams, which resulted in Bob Costas and Paul Sunderland working some early-round playoff games. Fratello would return to TNT after several days, and Albert returned to NBC for game one of the Western Conference Semifinals between the Dallas Mavericks and Sacramento Kings.

The season would also turn out to be NBC's last with the NBA. As previously mentioned, in January 2002, the league announced a six-year agreement with The Walt Disney Company and AOL Time Warner, which resulted in the broadcast television rights being acquired by ABC. That year, NBC's playoff ratings were much higher than in previous years, including tallying record-high ratings for the 2002 Western Conference Finals. Those high ratings did not translate to the Finals, which scored their lowest ratings in over two decades.

In 2002, NBC set a record for the highest-rated Western Conference Final, including a 14.2 rating for game seven of the series between the Los Angeles Lakers and Sacramento Kings.

==== The NBA moves from NBC to ABC ====
Upon the expiration of NBC Sports' contract with the NBA in 2002, the league signed a broadcast television rights agreement with ABC, which began airing games in the 2002–03 season. NBC had made a four-year, US$1.3 billion bid in the spring of 2002 to renew its NBA rights, but the league instead made six-year deals worth $4 billion with ESPN, ABC and TNT.

Simply put, NBC could not compete with the combined broadcast and cable deal that Disney had with ESPN and ABC. To put things into proper perspective, when NBC's relationship with the NBA ended in 2002, their only cable properties were CNBC and MSNBC. The major leagues receive more money from cable than broadcast, due to the duel revenue stream of subscriptions and ad revenue. It took a decade for NBC to have a strong cable portfolio, which now includes USA, E!, SyFy, and NBC Sports Network, amongst other channels. Another thing to keep in mind is the fact that NBC lost $35 million because of the failure of the XFL. As Charles Barkley summed it up during halftime of game one of the 2002 NBA Finals "If y'all hadn't wasted all that money on the XFL, y'all would still have basketball."

Whereas NBC normally televised 33 regular games per year, ABC would generally air fewer than 20 regular season games annually. According to NBA Commissioner David Stern, the reduced number of network telecasts was at the league's own request since the NBA believed that they would get a higher audience for a single game (in contrast to NBC's tripleheaders). From 2002 to 2006, the NBA's ratings on broadcast television (ABC) dropped almost a full ratings point (from nearly a 3.0 average rating to just above a 2.0 rating). NBC averaged a 5.5 average rating during the 2002 NBA Playoffs. ABC averaged a 3.3 average rating for the 2005 NBA Playoffs.

In response to the impending loss of NBA coverage, NBC Entertainment president Jeff Zucker said:

We lost football two years ago, and we stayed a strong No. 1. We lost baseball, and we stayed a strong No. 1. Now we're about to lose basketball, and I believe we'll stay a strong No. 1. The fact is, it's had no impact on our prime time strength. . . NBC can now program all of Sunday nights without going around basketball. I think that's a huge advantage for us. We haven't been able for the last several years to put a program at 8 o'clock (such as American Dreams) because we've had the NBA.

Within two years of the network losing the NBA rights, NBC dropped to fourth place in the prime time television rankings for the first time in its history, which was also partly the result of a weaker prime time schedule, and would more or less remain there until for almost nine years.

NBC Sports chairman Dick Ebersol said:

The definition of winning has become distorted. If winning the rights to a property brings with it hundreds of millions of dollars in losses, what have you won? When faced with the prospect of heavy financial losses, we have consistently walked away and have done so again. ... We wish the NBA all the best. We have really enjoyed working with them for more than a decade to build the NBA brand.

Ebersol added:

We walked away from the N.F.L., because it was the right thing to do, and we stayed No. 1 in prime-time in all the important aspects. We walked away from baseball because it was the right thing to do and we don't have to take off our fall shows to show playoff games. The N.B.A. was asking us to lose hundreds of millions of dollars.

In a down economy, after losing $100 million on the NBA in 2000–2001, NBC was projecting a $200-million loss in 2001–2002. The NBA also saw its NBC ratings for the regular season fall from 4.3 in 1999 to 3.0 in 2000. Meanwhile, and the playoff ratings dipped from 6.5 to 4.9.

NBC network president Randy Falco said:

We have a responsibility to our shareholders.

NBC's last NBA telecast to date was game four of the 2002 NBA Finals, which closed with highlights from the network's 12-year run with the league, through the Chicago Bulls' dynasty led by Michael Jordan and Scottie Pippen, the retirement of Larry Bird and Magic Johnson and the Los Angeles Lakers' new Shaq/Kobe reign. The final image of the end montage was set in an empty gym, showing a basketball bouncing into the background and ending with the message, "Thanks for The Memories." Prior to the sequence, match commentators Marv Albert, Steve Jones and Bill Walton evaluated the end of their NBA contract and of the series. After that, Bob Costas closed the network's last NBA broadcast with the following:

Okay, Marv, thanks very much. And as Marv himself would say, "it should be pointed out" that Marv is celebrating his forty-ninth birthday tonight for a record twelfth consecutive year. Well, another season is in the books. The Lakers' title run continues with perhaps no end in sight. But as Marv said, we have reached the end of our run with the NBA. NBC's twelve years televising the league had been filled with indelible moments. And so, as we say good night, here's an appreciative look back. And for one last time, you've been watching the NBA on NBC.

In 2002, after NBC's final broadcast, the network aired a montage of memorable moments from every year of coverage, using music from "Titans Spirit" (from the film Remember the Titans) to "Winning It All" and most notably, "To The Flemish Cap" from the 2000 film The Perfect Storm. The song composed by James Horner is played at the beginning of the montage as well as the end featuring footage from the Los Angeles Lakers dynasty era. This theme song has made a brief comeback as part of NBC's Olympic basketball coverage in 2008, and again in 2016. In December 2018, Fox Sports acquired the rights to "Roundball Rock" for use during college basketball games.

- During the 2002 NBA Finals, Ahmad Rashad had told The Los Angeles Times before the 2002 NBA Finals began that he would be ending his 20-year run on NBC Sports with game three of the NBA Finals on the pregame show. A feature in which he interviewed Shaquille O'Neal and Kobe Bryant would be his last assignment for the network. He and Hannah Storm were replaced by Bob Costas as host of the pregame show for the Finals, and Rashad declined to join Hannah Storm on the post-game show carried by CNBC.

=== 2003 ===
After obtaining the NBA broadcast rights, ABC courted two main announcers from the NBA on NBC, Bob Costas and Marv Albert. After Costas (who was reportedly offered a generous deal which also included offers to do play-by-play for ESPN's Major League Baseball telecasts and feature reports for ABC News) elected to remain with NBC, and Albert signed a six-year deal with TNT, the network went with veteran broadcaster Brad Nessler to be the lead play-by-play announcer for its NBA broadcasts. Nessler, who prior to that point had not been the main voice for any professional sport on television, received a call from Marv Albert's agent, soon after getting the job. On the call, Nessler said in an interview with the Internet Movie Database:

I need to know everybody and you can't know everybody and Marv knows everyone.... So, I'm just gonna use him as a valuable resource, if it's all right with him.

Nessler was initially joined on the broadcasts by color commentator Bill Walton and lead sideline reporter Michele Tafoya. The team of Nessler and Walton did two broadcasts together before ABC decided that Walton needed a partner (much like he had at NBC with Steve Jones) and assigned pre-game analyst Tom Tolbert to join the team. Nessler, Walton and Tolbert called most regular season games, and every network playoff game. Other games were called by the team of Brent Musburger and Sean Elliott. After suffering the worst ratings in NBA Finals history for the 2003 series, low ratings overall, and harsh criticism, ABC decided to retool the team. More to the point, during this particular period, Brad Nessler was accused by media analysts (among them, New York Times columnist Richard Sandomir) of not knowing game strategy well, lacking rhythm and enthusiasm in his game call, not bringing out the best in his partners, too often ignoring the score and his tendency to stammer.

Nessler and Walton worked NBA Wednesday games most weeks during the 2002–03 season. For NBA Friday, Mike Tirico and Tom Tolbert worked late night West Coast games while John Saunders and Sean Elliott did the early games. For the playoffs, ESPN added Jim Durham to its list of television play-by-play voices and used the ABC main team of Nessler, Walton and Tolbert for its coverage of the 2003 Eastern Conference Finals.

This was also the only year that ABC broadcast both the NBA and the Stanley Cup Final involving teams from one market in the same year, as both the New Jersey Nets and the New Jersey Devils were in their respective league's finals. During ABC's broadcast of game three between the San Antonio Spurs and the Nets in New Jersey on June 8, Nessler, Tolbert and Walton said that ABC was in a unique situation getting ready for both that game and game seven of the Stanley Cup Final between the Devils and the Mighty Ducks of Anaheim the following night. Gary Thorne, Bill Clement and John Davidson mentioned this the following night, and thanked Nessler, Tolbert and Walton for promoting ABC's broadcast of game seven of the Stanley Cup Final.

In its first year of coverage, ABC used the same graphics package as partner network ESPN, with the "score bug" being the only difference between the two networks' packages. This habit had already been put into practice by the network in regards to its NHL and college basketball coverage. However, ABC did utilize its own graphics (though they were similar in resemblance to ESPN's at the time) for college football and other sports broadcasts. For the 2003–04 season, ABC established new graphics for its NBA broadcasts, in an effort to differentiate its telecasts from ESPN's. On February 5, 2006, ABC established another new graphics package, including a horizontal scoreboard (similar to that introduced the previous fall for its final season of Monday Night Football) for the network's NBA telecasts.

With the advent of the new NBA television deal in 2003 (which ended TBS's coverage), TNT has aired playoff games alone, including (in 2003 only) some weekday tripleheaders. The tripleheaders, which were criticized by both fans and some in the media, consisted of one game at 6:00 p.m., another at 8:30 p.m., and a final game at 11:00 p.m. After 2003, the NBA and TNT discontinued the tripleheaders, instead settling for a doubleheader on TNT and a single game on NBA TV simultaneously. However, when Turner Sports acquired NBA TV in 2008, the network abandoned airing the lone non-national Thursday game, instead leaving it up to the local sports networks. However, TBS may still air the start of the second game in case the ongoing first game on TNT extends beyond the tip-off time of the second game.

On isolated occasions (typically during the playoffs) since TNT assumed partial cable rights to the NBA, TBS has served as an overflow feed for certain games. In 2003, TBS aired a doubleheader of first round game six matchups (the Indiana Pacers–Boston Celtics and San Antonio Spurs–Phoenix Suns series).

One common complaint about NBA coverage on ABC is the use of unconventional camera angles, including the Floorcam and Skycam angles, used by the network throughout its coverage. Other complaints are of camera angles that appear too far away, colors that seem faded and dull, and the quieting of crowd noise so that announcers can be heard clearly (by contrast to NBC, which allowed crowd noise to sometimes drown out their announcers).

Some complaints have concerned the promotion, or perceived lack thereof, of NBA telecasts. The 2003 NBA Finals received little fanfare on ABC or corporate partner ESPN; while subsequent Finals were promoted more on both networks, NBA-related advertisements on ABC were still down significantly from promotions on NBC. NBA promos took up 3 minutes and 55 seconds of airtime on ABC during the week of May 23, 2004 according to the Sports Business Daily, comparable to 2 minutes and 45 seconds for the Indianapolis 500. Promotions for the Indianapolis 500 outnumbered promotions for the NBA Finals fourteen-to-nine between the hours of 9:00 and 11:00 p.m. during that week.

- The 2003 NBA All-Star Game on TNT marked the first time that the game was broadcast by a cable television network. TNT airs a number of the NBA's marquee games (the NBA All-Star Game, a full Conference Final (alternating between the Western Conference in even-numbered years and the Eastern conference in odd-numbered years), Opening Night games, and the vast majority of playoff games). In recent years, fans have reckoned it as what NBC was during that network's coverage of the league. TNT would seem to be the NBA's preferred carrier as well; from 2003 to 2005, TNT aired the Conference Final with the most interest from the national media (Pistons–Nets in 2003, Lakers–Wolves in 2004 and Pistons–Heat in 2005). TNT also airs most of the big games during the regular season (TNT aired a Lakers-Heat game for the third straight year in 2007), and TNT studio content is streamed to NBA.com via the TNT Overtime section.
- 2003 NBA Finals: The series between the San Antonio Spurs and the New Jersey Nets was the lowest rated NBA Final (6.5 percent over six games) until 2007. This was also the only year that ABC broadcast both the NBA and the Stanley Cup Final that involved teams from one city in the same year, as both the New Jersey Nets and the New Jersey Devils were in their respective league's finals. During ABC's broadcast of game three between the San Antonio Spurs and the Nets in New Jersey on June 8, Brad Nessler, Tom Tolbert, and Bill Walton said that ABC was in a unique situation getting ready for both that game and game seven of the Stanley Cup Final between the Devils and the Mighty Ducks of Anaheim the following night, also at Continental Airlines Arena. Gary Thorne, Bill Clement, and John Davidson mentioned this the following night and thanked Nessler, Tolbert, and Walton for promoting ABC's broadcast of game seven of the Stanley Cup Final.

=== 2004 ===
After low ratings on ABC and for the Conference Finals, ESPN reshuffled its announcing group. With the addition of Al Michaels to the ABC NBA line-up. ESPN dissolved the Nessler-Tolbert-Walton team, keeping Nessler as the main announcer but pairing him with Sean Elliott and Dan Majerle. Walton was demoted significantly, working games sporadically (including most of the ESPN NBA Sunday games with either Jim Durham or Brent Musburger). Tolbert stayed with Mike Tirico in a new three-man booth that also included newcomer George Karl. Also added to the ESPN line-up was Mike Breen, who became the number three announcer behind Tirico and Nessler. Breen worked most of his games with Bill Walton.

Doc Rivers, a critically acclaimed analyst when he worked with Turner Sports for TNT's NBA broadcasts, became available after a 1–10 start by his Orlando Magic led to his firing as the team's coach. Rivers was hired weeks before ABC's Christmas Day season opener. He and Michaels worked that game together, one of only six they did together during the regular season (all other games Rivers worked were with Brad Nessler). During the playoffs, Michaels and Rivers worked every single telecast, including the 2004 NBA Finals, which saw significant ratings improvement.

During the 2004 NBA Playoffs, Doc Rivers was hired as head coach of the Boston Celtics. Though Rivers continued to work games with Al Michaels throughout the rest of the playoffs, ABC was forced to search for a new lead analyst for the 2004–05 season. In addition, the network dropped Brad Nessler from all NBA coverage, and did not retain Sean Elliott or Dan Majerle.

For the 2004 Eastern Conference Final, ESPN used Nessler along with ABC's lead analyst Doc Rivers for every game of the series. Game six between Detroit and Indiana was the last NBA game Nessler has called to date.

Each season, ABC begins its NBA coverage with a Christmas Day doubleheader (with the exception of 2004 and 2006, when the network broadcast only one game). From 2004 to 2006, ABC insisted on carrying a Christmas game between the Miami Heat and the Los Angeles Lakers. Since 2009, ABC's Christmas Day doubleheader has featured a music video featuring Mariah Carey performing her hit 1994 single "All I Want for Christmas Is You." In 2010, Carey was featured singing "Oh Santa!"

Following the initial Christmas game telecasts, Sunday afternoon coverage of regular season games begins in mid-January or early February. The number of Sunday afternoon regular season games that ABC normally covers is significantly lower than what NBC broadcast during its tenure with the league. In its first season of coverage, ABC aired 14 regular-season games, in comparison to NBC's yearly average of 33 games. That number increased to 18 games in the next two seasons (2003–04 and 2004–05), and 20 games in the 2005–06 season. For 2006–07, ABC decreased the number of game telecasts it aired during the season to 19. In a 2002 interview with Jim Rome, NBA commissioner David Stern commented about the number of league games broadcast on ABC:

Cable and satellite (programming is) increasingly available to everybody who wants it. On ABC, you're going to see us on as many or more Sundays during the regular season as NBC is now, but fewer triple-headers and double-headers, and frankly, we think that the triple-headers and double-headers, which we favored in the past, don't work. It's too hard to get people to sit through six and eight-and-a-half hours of NBA on (TV), and it's good to be on cable during the week because that's where our fans are looking for our games.

By contrast to Stern's assessment, media analysts and some fans found that the cable-heavy television deal made multiple games unavailable and, in addition, devalued the league. Starting with the second round of the playoffs, TNT's NBA coverage becomes exclusive, meaning that no locally produced league broadcasts can compete against the TNT telecasts (though commensurate with the move to sports rights to cable, few over-the-air local stations currently carry NBA coverage). Because of this, fans of teams in the playoffs who do not have a cable television subscription are unable to watch most playoff games. In addition, ABC's coverage is always exclusive, including during the regular season. If an ongoing game airs opposite one televised by ABC, it cannot be televised in the local market, which has the side effect of causing some games to not be aired on television at all. Sports Business Daily quoted Houston Chronicle writer Jonathan Feigen regarding the structuring of the NBA's deal with ABC:

[the NBA] seemed to marginalize the product, treating their sport as small and their playoffs as no more important than one of 162 Atlanta Braves games.

=== 2005 ===
Brad Nessler was dropped from ESPN/ABC's NBA coverage altogether starting with the 2004–05 NBA season. Mike Breen was promoted to lead announcer for ESPN, continuing to work games with Bill Walton (including the Pacers–Pistons brawl). Sean Elliott was dropped, along with Dan Majerle, Doc Rivers (who had become coach of the Boston Celtics) and George Karl (who left during the season to coach the Denver Nuggets). Jim Durham's role increased and ESPN hired former NBC analyst Steve Jones (Durham and Jones would work several regular season games together). ESPN did not use Jones and former cohort Bill Walton in games together during the regular season. Tom Tolbert's role decreased significantly; he was reduced primarily to West Coast games.

In the playoffs, ESPN used the team of Mike Breen and Bill Walton for its coverage of the 2005 Western Conference Final. Al Michaels partnered with newly added Hubie Brown for the NBA Finals on ABC.

Outside of the Conference Finals, ABC generally airs playoff games throughout the first five weeks of the NBA Playoffs, in addition to a number of special prime-time playoff games, usually televised on Thursday or Saturday nights. In 2005, ABC aired the first non-cable Memorial Day game in three years, when the Phoenix Suns and San Antonio Spurs battled in game four of the Western Conference Finals. Prior to the most recent NBA television deal, Memorial Day playoff games had become a yearly tradition on network television.

Unlike previous broadcast partners, ABC has never aired a non-Christmas regular season game after 3:30 p.m. Eastern Time. While NBC had several 5:30 p.m. Eastern start times for games, ABC has only gone beyond that time on Christmas, and for select playoff games, including the Finals. On March 20, 2005, ABC aired a pair of games regionally (between the San Antonio Spurs and Detroit Pistons, and the Phoenix Suns and Memphis Grizzlies) at 3:30 p.m. Eastern Time. After the Spurs–Pistons game ended, the network opted to end coverage for its stations to carry regularly scheduled local programming instead of switching over to the Suns–Grizzlies game (in which the Suns were up 94–91 late in the fourth quarter). NBC rarely committed this practice, as it instead showed the tail end of a game still in progress after the previous game has completed.

Early in the 2004–2005 season, Memphis Grizzlies coach Hubie Brown, a broadcasting legend with CBS, TBS and TNT, was forced into retirement due to health issues and was soon after hired to replace Doc Rivers as Al Michaels' broadcast booth partner. Brown called his first ABC game with Michaels on Christmas Day 2004, working the highly anticipated a Heat-Lakers game pitting those team's respective star players Shaquille O'Neal and Kobe Bryant. After that game, the two did not do a game together again until March 2005. Michaels began covering NBA games sporadically, doing two games in early March and three additional games in April. Meanwhile, Brown worked every week of ABC's coverage, broadcasting some games with veteran broadcaster Mike Breen. Michele Tafoya served as lead sideline reporter for all of the network's game broadcasts.

In addition to Hubie Brown, ABC added other known analysts to its NBA coverage. Jim Durham and Dr. Jack Ramsay both worked several games during the regular season, while Brent Musburger, John Saunders, Len Elmore and Mark Jackson were involved with others. Breen and Ramsay were the first secondary broadcast team to work a playoff game for ABC. Breen called three playoff games for the network in 2005, the most notable being game one of the Western Conference Finals with Hubie Brown.

Al Michaels was criticized by the New York Post for not broadcasting the game and seeming uninterested in the NBA in general. Barry Horn of The Dallas Morning News said that Michaels was simply "not a basketball guy". Meanwhile, Bill Simmons said during the 2005 Finals that Michaels "shows up for these games, does his job, then drives home thinking, ‘Only five weeks to the [NFL] Hall of Fame Game, I'm almost there!’" Another criticism that Michaels received was that he too often found himself making tediously long-winded explanations. In return, he would tend to talk over two or three possessions in a row (which Michaels seemed to be better suited for football and baseball broadcasts, for which he's better known for). The end result was that he would hardly have time to comment on the action viewers were seeing because he was so hung up on a prior subplot or storyline that he felt the audience just had to know about. Michaels was also accused of apparently lacking the kind of enthusiasm and confidence (for instance, Michaels initially reacted to Amar'e Stoudemire's block of Tim Duncan's shot during the 2005 playoffs by calling it a "great, great contested shot") expected of a main play-by-play voice.

Michaels, who by the end of his tenure on the NBA on ABC only called a total of 37 NBA games overall with ABC (a combined thirteen regular season games), did return for the NBA Finals, which scored its second-lowest rating of all time (despite the fact that it was the first Finals in eleven years to go to a seventh game). From March 7, 2004, to April 17, 2005 – including playoff games – each game Michaels called involved either the Los Angeles Lakers (whose home city Michaels resides when not broadcasting sports events) or Sacramento Kings, a total of 21 consecutive games. Game seven of the 2005 NBA Finals would end up being Michaels' last with the NBA on ABC.

=== 2006 ===
ESPN's announcing teams remained stable in the 2005–06 NBA season. Mike Breen and Bill Walton worked games together during the first half of the season; after Breen was promoted to lead broadcaster for ABC (due to Al Michaels defecting to NBC), Mike Tirico became the number two broadcaster and worked several games with Walton (and later, Steve Jones). During the 2006 NBA Playoffs, Breen worked games with ABC partner Hubie Brown, including the 2006 Eastern Conference Final.

On May 22, 2006, due to game seven of the San Antonio Spurs–Dallas Mavericks series going into overtime, TBS aired part of the game seven Western Conference playoff match between the Los Angeles Clippers and Phoenix Suns. On May 14, 2004, the same situation arose, as game five of the New Jersey Nets–Detroit Pistons playoff series lasted three overtimes. However, due to scheduling conflicts with TBS, TNT had to air part of the Sacramento Kings–Minnesota Timberwolves game that was supposed to follow on NBA TV. The first few minutes of game four of the 2007 Western Conference Semifinal between the Phoenix Suns and San Antonio Spurs were shown on TBS, due to the game between the Cleveland Cavaliers and the New Jersey Nets running past the former's 9:30 p.m. Eastern start time.

The above situations are not unlike those that have been encountered during TBS telecasts of Major League Baseball Division Series games since 2007; at times, due to certain games running over their scheduled end time, TNT has had to air the first few minutes of games that TBS is supposed to cover.

In 2006, after ABC Sports became ESPN on ABC the NBA on ABC started to be produced by ESPN with ESPN graphics. All broadcasts have an "on ABC" suffix on their titles after this rebrand.

ESPN, along with partner network ABC, began using graphics packages inherited by ESPN's Monday Night Football broadcast starting in 2006, featuring a score banner with an oblique red and white design. The graphics were later replaced in April 2009 with a more compact grey design, with panel-like lower thirds and a permanent "stats bar" located underneath the score and time. This was replaced in 2010 with an updated appearance based on another redesign adopted by Monday Night Football in late 2009, featuring a more metallic appearance that would later be adopted by other ESPN properties, along with the addition of yellow lights beneath a team's name to indicate remaining timeouts. At the start of the 2011–12 season, an updated version of the design was adopted with a more translucent appearance, and the addition of a "BONUS" indicator under a team's score if they have reached enough fouls to initiate the Bonus situation. Starting with the 2013 Western Conference Finals, a newly designed banner featuring 3-dimensional renditions of the team logos were used. During the 2015 NBA Finals, the graphics were updated with gold coloring, patterned backgrounds, and a modern, unified font. At the start of the 2015–16 season however, ESPN reverted to the banner used since 2013. On May 17, 2016, the aforementioned updated graphics package from the previous year's NBA Finals returned for the 2016 Eastern Conference Finals and again for the 2016 NBA Finals.

- 2006 NBA Finals: Lisa Salters was the main sideline reporter alongside Stuart Scott with Michele Tafoya on maternity leave. She was the main ABC sideline reporter for that season before sliding back to secondary reporter with Tafoya's return.

=== 2007 ===
For the 2006–07 NBA season, Hubie Brown moved to ESPN full-time as the lead color commentator, paired with Mike Breen. Mike Tirico and Bill Walton remained as the number two team, with Steve Jones being replaced by newcomer Jon Barry. Tom Tolbert remained in his reduced role, in a broadcast team with either Mark Jones or ESPN WNBA play-by-play man Dave Pasch. John Saunders, with former NBA Shootaround colleagues Greg Anthony and Tim Legler worked Sunday night games televised by ESPN, as they had in the previous season. Fred Hickman became the primary studio host, working with a rotating team of analysts. Additions included Jamal Mashburn and Allan Houston.

ESPN increased its number of female analysts, adding current WNBA players Becky Hammon and Kara Lawson as sideline reporters. Swin Cash, of the Detroit Shock, was added as a studio analyst, debuting on NBA Shootaround early in the season. Doris Burke continued as a sideline reporter, while Lisa Salters (who had added Saturday Night Football to her duties) cut down on working NBA Friday games. On January 12, 2007, Kara Lawson was the analyst alongside play-by-play man Mark Jones for ESPN's Washington Wizards–New Orleans/Oklahoma City Hornets game. During this season, ABC's coverage of the NBA was fully integrated in ESPN.

In June 2007, and again in October 2014, the NBA renewed its television agreement with ESPN, as well as TNT, with the current contract extending through the 2024–25 season.

On July 9, 2007, it was announced by Dan Patrick that he would be leaving ESPN after 18 years with the network. Stuart Scott hosted ABC's pregame show for the 2007–08 season along with analysts Bill Walton and Michael Wilbon. Jeff Van Gundy also joined Mike Breen and Mark Jackson full-time, starting Christmas Day. After Walton had back problems in February, Jon Barry replaced him for the rest of the season.

For the 2006–07 NBA season, ABC's sports operations were fully integrated into ESPN (rebranding the sports division as ESPN on ABC). As a result, Mark Jackson replaced Hubie Brown as ABC's lead analyst (Brown would still pair with Mike Breen on ESPN's primary broadcast team and Mike Tirico on ABC's secondary team). ABC's pre-game show, which Jackson was a part of, also began to be broadcast from the site of the main game each week (much as was the case during first season of the network's current NBA deal in 2003).

Additionally, Michele Tafoya returned as a sideline reporter, after sitting out the 2005–06 season on maternity leave. Lisa Salters returned to her role as its secondary sideline reporter the following year as Tafoya returned to her old role.

- Although the 2007 NBA Finals aired on ABC (as had been the case since 2003), they were the first to carry the "ESPN on ABC" branding instead of the ABC Sports branding.
  - The Finals between the San Antonio Spurs and the Cleveland Cavaliers was the lowest rated NBA Finals ever (6.2 percent rating over four games).
  - Since 2007, NBA ratings have steadily risen, thanks to the resurgence of nationally recognized NBA teams, their star power, and their annual presence in the NBA Finals. Game seven of the 2010 NBA Finals had the best rating for a basketball game in the contemporary NBA on ABC era, and the 2011 Finals held steady in the ratings department as well. Both series drew over a 10 rating, beating the World Series in consecutive years for the first time ever.

On November 9, 2007, when the Houston Rockets with Yao Ming faced off against the Milwaukee Bucks with Yi Jianlian, over 200 million people in China watched on 19 different networks, making it the most-viewed game in NBA history.

=== 2008 ===
ABC was also criticized for focusing its coverage on a select number of teams, particularly the decision to broadcast a Lakers-Heat game on its Christmas Day schedule for three consecutive years. However, for 2007, ABC decided to break this tradition by instead having the Heat, for the fourth straight time, appear on Christmas Day facing the 2007 Eastern Conference Champions, the Cleveland Cavaliers. In 2008, the Boston Celtics replaced the Heat on the Christmas Day schedule, and faced the Los Angeles Lakers; and in 2009, the Cavaliers played the Lakers on Christmas Day. However, the Heat-Lakers Christmas Day special would make its return in the 2010–11 NBA season, as a result of LeBron James' recent move from the Cleveland franchise to Miami. For the 2011–12 NBA season, the Lakers and Heat played again on Christmas Day, but against separate opponents. The Lakers played the Chicago Bulls, while the Heat played the Dallas Mavericks in a rematch of the 2011 NBA Finals; both the Bulls and Mavericks made their ABC Christmas Day debuts, which also acted as the league's opening day that season due to the 2011 NBA lockout delaying the start of the season. In the case of the latter, ABC aired the pre-game championship ring and banner ceremony for the Mavericks, which marked the first time in NBA history a national broadcast network televised the ceremony.

In the 2007–08 season, Jeff Van Gundy joined ESPN's coverage, pairing with Mike Breen on the lead broadcast team. Mike Tirico and Hubie Brown, who worked ABC games together last season, formed the number two team, with Dan Shulman replacing Tirico when he had Monday Night Football commitments. Bill Walton became ESPN's lead studio analyst, along with Stuart Scott and Stephen A. Smith. Mark Jones also hosted NBA Shootaround, and occasionally paired with Jon Barry as the third team, replacing Shulman. Tom Tolbert, who called the NBA Finals for ABC just 4 years earlier, was dropped, along with reporter Jim Gray. Rick Carlisle and Jalen Rose also were added, giving analysis on Sportscenter and occasionally appearing on NBA Shootaround. On December 31, 2007, analyst Kiki Vandeweghe left ESPN to pursue a role with the New Jersey Nets.

Michele Tafoya left her role as NBA sideline reporter for ABC after the 2007–08 season to spend more time with her family, however she continued to work for ESPN, primarily serving as a sideline reporter for Monday Night Football (before leaving for NBC in 2011 to serve that same position for Sunday Night Football). Doris Burke, who already served as an analyst for ESPN's NBA telecasts, replaced Tafoya as lead sideline reporter on the ABC broadcasts.

=== 2009 ===
In 2008, TNT broadcast on Christmas Day for the first time as Marv Albert, Mike Fratello and Craig Sager broadcast the game between the Washington Wizards and the Cleveland Cavaliers in Quicken Loans Arena and Kevin Harlan, Reggie Miller and Cheryl Miller broadcast the game between the Dallas Mavericks and the Portland Trail Blazers in Rose Garden.

== See also ==
- List of NBA on ABC commentators
- List of NBA on ESPN broadcasters
- List of NBA on NBC broadcasters
- List of NBA on TNT commentators
- NBA on television in the 1950s
  - NBA on television in the 1960s
  - NBA on television in the 1970s
  - NBA on television in the 1980s
  - NBA on television in the 1990s
  - NBA on television in the 2010s
- List of NBA Finals broadcasters § 2000s
- List of NBA All-Star Game broadcasters#2000s
