= NBA on television in the 1960s =

As one of the major sports leagues in North America, the National Basketball Association has a long history of partnership with television networks in the US. The League signed a contract with DuMont in its 8th season (1953–54), marking the first year the NBA had a national television broadcaster. Similar to NFL, the lack of television stations led to NBC taking over the rights beginning the very next season until April 7, 1962 - NBC's first tenure with the NBA. After the deal expired, Sports Network Incorporated (later known as the Hughes Television Network) signed up for two-year coverage in the 1962–63, 1963–64 season. ABC gained the NBA in 1964, the network aired its first NBA game on January 3, 1965, but lost the broadcast rights to CBS after the 1972–73 season with the initial tenure ending on May 10, 1973.

== 1960-1962 ==
As previously mentioned, NBC Sports first broadcast the NBA from the 1954–55 through 1961–62 seasons. The announcers during this period included:

- Jerry Doggett (1960–1961)
- Marty Glickman (1954–1961)
- Jim Gordon (1954–55)
- Curt Gowdy (1955–1960)
- Chick Hearn (1957–1958)
- Joe Lapchick (1955–56)
- Lindsey Nelson (1954–1961)
- Bill O'Donnell (1957–1960)
- Bud Palmer (1958–1962)
- Bob Wolff (1961–1962)

== 1962-1963 ==
For 1962–63, SNI did two games. The first one being the All-Star Game at Los Angeles with Chick Hearn and Bud Blattner on the call. The second game was the sixth and deciding game of the NBA Finals between the Boston Celtics and Los Angeles Lakers with Bob Wolff on the call.

- 1962 NBA Finals – All of the games from Boston were televised in Los Angeles on Channel 9 (then called KHJ-TV) with Chick Hearn on play-by-play. For Game 7, Jack Drees joined the broadcast team. In addition, Chick Hearn indicated that Game 7 was being syndicated around the nation to a variety of cities. The game was broadcast in Boston by WHDH-TV, but the station originated its own broadcast with Don Gillis as the commentator.

== 1963-1964 ==
For 1963–64, SNI broadcast a series of Thursday night games starting January 2. The broadcast teams during the regular season were Marty Glickman and Carl Braun for games in the Eastern Division and Bud Blattner and Ed Macauley for games in the Western Division.

They also broadcast the All-Star Game from Boston with Marty Glickman and Bud Blattner sharing play-by-play duties and with Carl Braun and Ed Macauley doing analysis.

SNI broadcast at least four playoff games starting on March 28 with St. Louis at Los Angeles with Jerry Gross on play-by-play and Ed Macauley on color commentary. The other games (all involving Marty Glickman on play-by-play) included:

- Cincinnati at Boston on April 9
- St. Louis at San Francisco on April 16
- Boston at San Francisco on April 24

Carl Braun, Alex Hannum, and Fred Schaus were the respective analysts for the April 9, April 16, and April 24 playoff broadcasts.

== 1964-1969 ==
ABC first signed a deal with the National Basketball Association to become the league's primary television partner in 1964; the network's first game telecast aired on January 3, 1965 (a game between the Boston Celtics and Cincinnati Royals). For much of the 1960s, ABC only televised Sunday afternoon games, including during the NBA Playoffs. This meant that ABC did not have to televise a potential NBA Finals deciding game if it were played on a weeknight. In 1969, ABC did televise Game 7 of the Los Angeles Lakers–Boston Celtics series in prime time on a weeknight. The following season, ABC aired the 1970 NBA Finals in its entirety, making it the first Finals series to have all games televised nationally.

Commentators for the original NBA on ABC included play-by-play announcers Keith Jackson and Chris Schenkel, and analysts Jack Twyman, Bob Cousy and Bill Russell. On April 8, 1967, a strike by the American Federation of Television and Radio Artists (AFTRA) forced ABC Sports producer Chuck Howard and director Chet Forte to call Game 4 of the Eastern Conference Finals between Boston Celtics and Philadelphia 76ers, as its regular announcing team were members of the union. Curt Gowdy also served on play-by-play for half of the 1967–68 season.

The first nationally televised Christmas Day NBA broadcast occurred in 1967, when ABC broadcast a game between the Los Angeles Lakers and San Diego Rockets from the then-San Diego Sports Arena in San Diego. Jerry Gross and Jack Twyman called that particular broadcast for the network. ABC would continue to televise Christmas games through 1972. The remainder of these broadcasts were based from Arizona Veterans Memorial Coliseum in Phoenix. Chris Schenkel did play-by-play for ABC during this period with the exception of 1970, when Keith Jackson held that responsibility. Jack Twyman remained as color commentator for the broadcasts up until 1971, when the position was assumed by Bill Russell. ABC lost the broadcast rights to the NBA to CBS after the 1972–73 season, with the network's initial tenure with the league ending with its last NBA Finals game on May 10, 1973.

- 1969 NBA Finals – Game 7 was televised by ABC in prime time.
- In Game 4 of the 1965 Finals, the Boston Celtics beat the Los Angeles Lakers 112 to 99. In the closing minutes of the game, ABC cut away to a previously scheduled program. This event was likened to NBC cutting away from the World Series with the home team ahead 10 runs in the ninth inning.
- For the majority of the 1960s, ABC only televised Sunday afternoon games, including the playoffs. ABC did not have to televise the deciding game if it occurred on a weeknight.

== See also ==
- List_of_NBA_Finals_broadcasters#1960s
- List_of_NBA_All-Star_Game_broadcasters#1960s
- List of NBA on ABC commentators
- List of NBA on NBC broadcasters
- NBA on television in the 1950s
  - NBA on television in the 1970s
  - NBA on television in the 1980s
  - NBA on television in the 1990s
  - NBA on television in the 2000s
  - NBA on television in the 2010s
