= NBA on television in the 1950s =

The League signed a contract with DuMont in its 8th season (1953–54), marking the first year the NBA had a national television broadcaster. Similar to NFL, the lack of television stations led to NBC taking over the rights beginning the very next season until April 7, 1962 – NBC's first tenure with the NBA.

== 1953–54 ==
The contract had the DuMont Television Network televising 13 Saturday afternoon games. According to the book Tall Tales, NBA owners wanted the presumably "worst" game of the week to be shown on DuMont, because they were afraid if the "best" games were shown, it would negatively affect the gate for that game. Also, even though DuMont wanted the games on Saturday afternoons, a number of owners resisted because they feared that Saturday matinees would not draw as many people as a night game.

The DuMont Network would televise 20 Saturday afternoon games the following season, paying $39,000 for the rights. DuMont's first game aired on December 12, 1953, with the Boston Celtics defeating the Baltimore Bullets 106–75. This was the only year of NBA coverage on DuMont; the Saturday afternoon package moved to NBC for the 1954–55 season, mainly because NBC could clear the games on far more stations that DuMont could.

Games on DuMont were usually blacked out in the cities they were played in; for example, the three Boston Celtics home games included in the 1953-54 package were blacked-out in Boston, however, WJAR-TV in nearby Providence (whose signal covers most of the metropolitan Boston area) did carry the two regular-season Celtics' home games that were part of the DuMont package.

Date	Teams	Commentators
12/12/53	Baltimore @ Boston	Marty Glickman and Curt Gowdy
12/19/53	Syracuse @ Boston	Marty Glickman and Curt Gowdy
12/26/53	Boston @ Milwaukee	Marty Glickman and John Reddy
1/2/54	Philadelphia @ Syracuse	Marty Glickman and Dick Grossman
1/9/54	Minneapolis @ Milwaukee	Marty Glickman and John Reddy
1/16/54	Philadelphia @ Baltimore	Marty Glickman
1/23/54	Philadelphia @ Rochester	Marty Glickman
1/30/54	Milwaukee @ Minneapolis	Marty Glickman
2/6/54	Fort Wayne @ Syracuse	Marty Glickman and Dick Grossman
2/13/54	Syracuse @ Rochester	Marty Glickman
2/20/54	Fort Wayne @ Baltimore	Marty Glickman
2/27/54	Milwaukee @ Philadelphia	Marty Glickman
3/6/54	Philadelphia @ Syracuse	Marty Glickman and Dick Grossman
3/13/54	New York @ Syracuse	Marty Glickman and Dick Grossman
3/20/54	New York @ Boston	Marty Glickman
3/27/54	Minneapolis @ Rochester	Marty Glickman
4/3/54	Syracuse @ Minneapolis	Marty Glickman
4/10/54	Minneapolis @ Syracuse	Marty Glickman

Marty Glickman and Lindsay Nelson called Games 2 and 5 of the 1954 NBA Finals for DuMont.

== 1954–1959 ==
NBC's first tenure with the National Basketball Association began on October 30, 1954, and lasted until April 7, 1962. On November 9, 1989, the NBA reached an agreement with the network worth US$600 million contract to broadcast the league's games for four years, beginning with the 1990–91 season. On April 28, 1993, NBC extended its exclusive broadcast rights to the NBA with a four-year, $750 million contract.

The announcers during this period included:

- Jerry Doggett (1960–1961)
- Marty Glickman (1954–1961)
- Jim Gordon (1954–55)
- Curt Gowdy (1955–1960)
- Chick Hearn (1957–1958)
- Joe Lapchick (1955–56)
- Lindsey Nelson (1954–1961)
- Bill O'Donnell (1957–1960)
- Bud Palmer (1958–1962)
- Bob Wolff (1961–1962)

The 1959 NBA All-Star Game marked the first time that the All-Star Game was nationally televised. However, NBC only broadcast the second half at 10 p.m. Eastern Time, in lieu of its Friday Night Fights telecast. The 1959 All-Star Game was announced by Don Dunphy per Dick Barhold, who shared this fact with David J. Halberstam.

== See also ==
- List of NBA Finals broadcasters#1950s
- List of NBA All-Star Game broadcasters#1950s
- List of NBA on NBC broadcasters
- NBA on television in the 1960s
  - NBA on television in the 1970s
  - NBA on television in the 1980s
  - NBA on television in the 1990s
  - NBA on television in the 2000s
  - NBA on television in the 2010s
