= NBA on television in the 1990s =

As the national broadcaster of the NBA, CBS aired NBA games from the 1973–74 until the 1989–90 season, during which the early 1980s became known notoriously as the tape-delay playoff era.

NBC then succeeded the broadcast rights from 1990 to 2002. During NBC's partnership with the NBA in the 1990s, the league rose to unprecedented popularity, with ratings surpassing the days of Magic Johnson and Larry Bird in the mid-1980s. Upon expiration of the contract in 2002, the league signed an agreement with ABC, which began airing games in the 2002–03 season. NBC had made a four-year $1.3 billion ($330 million/year) bid in the spring of 2002 to renew its NBA rights, but the league instead went to ESPN and ABC with a six-year deal worth $2.4 billion ($400 million/year), a total of $4.6 billion ($766 million/year) when adding the cable deal with Turner Sports.

== Year-by-year summary ==
=== 1990 ===
On November 9, 1989, the NBA and NBC reached an agreement on a four-year, US$600 million contract (beginning in the 1990–1991 season).

The NBA's popularity was skyrocketing by the late '80s and Commissioner David Stern wanted more exposure. This meant that he wanted more than 15 games a year shown on network television. However, CBS didn't have the room to broadcast double and triple headers every Sunday like NBC could because of their NFL and college basketball coverage. Plus around this time, CBS had signed deals with Major League Baseball and the Winter Olympics, making it even more difficult to accommodate the NBA's request for more over the air telecasts. All in all, CBS was by 1990 pretty much destined to cut ties with the NBA.

From 1986 to its final year in 1990, CBS paid about US$47 million per year for the NBA broadcast contract. The final NBA game that CBS televised to date occurred on June 14, 1990. It was Game 5 of the NBA Finals between the Detroit Pistons and Portland Trail Blazers. The Pistons won the game 92–90 to clinch their second consecutive World Championship. As the soundtrack for their goodbye montage, CBS used "The Last Waltz" by The Band and Marvin Gaye's rendition of "The Star-Spangled Banner" from the 1983 NBA All-Star Game, ending CBS Sports' relationship with the NBA after 17 years. While the network broadcast all five NBA Finals involving Larry Bird, all four NBA Finals involving Julius Erving, nine of the ten NBA Finals involving Kareem Abdul-Jabbar, and eight of the nine NBA Finals involving Magic Johnson (with the exception of 1991, which was Magic Johnson's last and the first to be broadcast by NBC), it never broadcast a Final involving Michael Jordan.

Prior to the closing montage, the network's final NBA game broadcast on June 14, 1990, ended with this sign-off by Dick Stockton:

Well, I guess now the time has come. This is our last game as many of you may know. And it's really the end of a 17-year love affair between CBS and the NBA. For every member of our broadcast team and I mean technicians, and cameramen, production people, the terrifically talented folks in the truck, where it all happens, and of course...the commentators, this has been an extraordinary experience. We've witnessed the careers of Julius Erving and Larry Bird and Magic Johnson. We've seen Michael Jordan take flight. All the players actually...fired the imagination not only for an entire generation of NBA fans but for all of us at CBS. We know we leave the NBA in good hands. But to Isiah and Akeem and Patrick and David Robinson, to all the players, coaches...and you the viewers, we're going to miss all of you. So long!

- Once Larry Bird and Magic Johnson retired, the NBA's ratings sank, at least for one year. The 1990 NBA Finals, (which was played before either Bird or Johnson retired) which registered a 12.3 rating (and was the last Finals CBS aired) was the lone NBA Finals between the domination of Bird and Magic and the domination of then up-and-coming star Michael Jordan. In 1991, NBC's first year with the NBA, the network got its dream matchup. Jordan's Bulls finally broke through, after several years of being dominated by the Pistons, and made it to the Finals. Jordan and the Bulls played Magic Johnson and the Lakers, who were making what was to be their last appearance in the NBA Finals for the next nine years. The hype for the star-studded series was robust, and the ratings were the highest since 1987, when the Celtics and Lakers played for the final time. The next year, Jordan's Bulls once again made the Finals. Their competition that year was the Portland Trail Blazers, a team with fewer stars and from a smaller city. The ratings fell to a 14.2, the second-lowest rating for the Finals since 1986. In 1993, the NBA hit a high point. The six-game series between the Bulls and the bombastic Charles Barkley's Phoenix Suns averaged a 17.9 rating, a mark that eclipsed the previous record of 15.9.

=== 1991 ===
Ernie Johnson Jr. has been TNT's NBA studio host since the 1990–1991 season. Currently, Johnson is joined by Kenny Smith, Charles Barkley, and Shaquille O'Neal. The NBA postgame show which features the four, Inside the NBA, has gained popularity in recent years for the chemistry and banter they have. Occasionally, Johnson, O'Neal, Smith and Barkley are joined by Chris Webber, Kevin McHale, David Aldridge, Reggie Miller or Isiah Thomas.

NBC's coverage of the NBA began on Christmas Day each season, with the exception of the inaugural season in 1990 (which featured a game on November 3 between the Los Angeles Lakers and the San Antonio Spurs), the 1997–98 season (which included a preseason tournament featuring the Chicago Bulls), the 1998–99 season (as no Christmas games were played due to the 1998–99 NBA lockout), and the final season of the network's contract in 2001–02 (which included two early season games featuring the return of Michael Jordan with the Washington Wizards). NBC aired the NBA All-Star Game every year (with the exception of 1999, when the game was canceled due to the lockout), usually at 6:00 pm, Eastern Time.

The theme music for the NBA on NBC broadcasts, "Roundball Rock", was composed by new-age artist John Tesh. The instrumental piece, which NBC used for every telecast during the network's twelve-year tenure. Although Tesh offered the theme to ABC when it took over the rights to the league, the network declined.

The pre-game show for NBC's NBA telecasts was NBA Showtime, a title that was used from 1990 until 2000, with the pre-game being unbranded afterward. Showtime was originally hosted by Bob Costas from the inaugural season of the 1990 contract to the 1995–96 season; Hannah Storm took over as host beginning with the 1996–97 season, who in turn was replaced by Ahmad Rashad in 2001 when Storm went on maternity leave. The video game NBA Showtime: NBA on NBC, by Midway Games, was named after the pregame show.

NBC's first broadcast team of the 1990s–2000s era was made up of Marv Albert and Mike Fratello, with Ahmad Rashad serving as sideline reporter. Other broadcasters at the time included Dick Enberg and Steve "Snapper" Jones. Aside from Rashad, Jim Gray and Hannah Storm also handled sideline reporting duties; before becoming the television voice of the Spurs, Lakers and Pelicans, Joel Meyers also started as a sideline reporter for NBC. Bob Costas presided as host of the network's pre-game show, NBA Showtime.

In 1991, "The Dream is Still Alive" by Wilson Phillips was played during the end of the season montage.

- Game 1 of the 1991 Finals, played on Sunday afternoon (June 2), was the last time an NBA Finals game was played as a matinee. Since then, weekend games of the Finals (as well as midweek games) have been played in the evening to accommodate prime-time television.

=== 1992 ===
- 1992 NBA Finals: Magic Johnson helped call Games 1, 4, and 5 for NBC.

=== 1993 ===
In 1992, basketball legend Earvin "Magic" Johnson became a top game analyst (alongside the likes of Enberg, Albert and Fratello); however, his performance was heavily criticized. Among the complaints were his apparently poor diction skills, his tendency for "stating the obvious", his habitual references to his playing days, and an overall lackluster chemistry with his broadcasting partners. Johnson would ultimately be slowly phased out of the NBA on NBC after helping commentate the 1993 NBA Finals.

- 1993 NBA Finals: Magic Johnson was unavailable for NBC's coverage of Game 6 (the series clincher) because he was attending his brother Larry's wedding.

=== 1994 ===
In 1994, Mike Fratello left the booth (to become the head coach of the Cleveland Cavaliers) and was replaced with Matt Guokas. Albert and Guokas broadcast the 1994 NBA Finals and were joined for the 1995 NBA Finals by Bill Walton. Albert, Guokas and Walton, while not working regular season games together (Walton usually worked games with Steve Jones and play-by-play announcers Dick Enberg, Tom Hammond or Greg Gumbel), broadcast the next two Finals (1996 and 1997) together in a three-man booth.

- 1994 NBA Finals: During Game 5 (June 17, 1994) most NBC affiliates (with the noted exception being WNBC-TV out of New York City) split-screened coverage of the game with NFL Hall of Famer O. J. Simpson's low speed freeway chase with the LAPD.
- The 1993 Finals were Michael Jordan's last before his first retirement. The Houston Rockets would take the next two titles consecutively. The ratings for those next two Finals decreased, but still had above-average views, and the 1995 Finals even came to within .3 ratings points of the 1992 Finals and featured Superstar Shaquille O'Neal making the Finals with the Orlando Magic, which were swept 4–0 by the Rockets. After the two seasons, Jordan returned. Subsequently, and almost instantly, ratings greatly increased. Jordan's first game back, a March 19, 1995, game between the Bulls and the Indiana Pacers, scored a 10.9 rating for NBC, the highest rated regular-season NBA game of all time. Ratings for the Finals (which the Bulls played in the following three years) went up sharply as well. Game 1 of the 1996 NBA Finals between the Bulls and Seattle SuperSonics, the Bulls' 107–90 win at home in the United Center earned a 16.8 rating and a 31 share on NBC. In addition, Game 1 was viewed in a then record 16,111,200 homes. On June 16, 1996, Game 6 of the NBA Finals (where the Bulls clinched their fourth NBA Championship in six years) drew an 18.8 rating and a 35 share. The six games of the 1996 NBA Finals averaged a 16.7 rating which ranks second all-time behind the 1993 NBA Finals. The six games of the 1993 NBA Finals between the Bulls and Suns averaged a 17.9 rating. The next year, ratings for the Bulls–Utah Jazz series were slightly better, before the 1998 Finals blew away the 1993 record, averaging an 18.7 rating—one which will likely not be matched by the NBA Finals for the foreseeable future. The deciding Game 6 (and Michael Jordan's final game with the Bulls) registered an NBA record 22.3 rating with a 38 share. The game was viewed by 72 million people, breaking the record set earlier that postseason by Game 7 of the 1998 Eastern Conference Finals between the Pacers and Bulls (that same game set a record for highest-rated non-Finals NBA game with a 19.1/33). The 1998 Finals managed to best the ratings for that year's World Series, the first of only three NBA Finals ever to do so.

=== 1995 ===
The original voice of the NBA on TNT was Bob Neal, who worked with the network from 1989 to 1995; he was also the original voice of the NBA on TBS. Other announcers who worked for TNT include Hubie Brown, Dick Stockton, Verne Lundquist, Chuck Daly, Danny Ainge, Reggie Theus, Rex Chapman, John Thompson, Jeff Van Gundy, P. J. Carlesimo, Gary Bender, Matt Devlin, Joel Meyers and Kevin Calabro.

NBC's highest-rated regular season game was Michael Jordan's first game back from playing minor league baseball; the March 1995 game between the Chicago Bulls and Indiana Pacers scored a 10.9 rating (higher than all but three NBA telecasts on ABC). As a comparison, the first game in Jordan's second comeback (a game against the New York Knicks that aired on TBS opposite the 2001 World Series) scored a rating between a 3.0 and 4.0. NBC's first game of Jordan's second comeback scored ratings similar to that number.

=== 1997 ===
From 1997 to 2001, several contemporary music pieces were used for the montage (including, in 1997, R. Kelly's song "I Believe I Can Fly", which coincidentally came from a basketball film – Space Jam, which starred Michael Jordan and Pat Benatar's song "All Fired Up" from 1999 to 2001).

- During the 1997 NBA Finals, Hannah Storm became the first woman to serve as pre-game host of the NBA Finals after serving as a sideline reporter for NBC in the past four years, but she wasn't the first female broadcaster to cover the NBA Finals (that honor goes to Lesley Visser).

=== 1998 ===
1997 was the last time Marv Albert would call the NBA Finals for NBC during the decade, as an embarrassing sex scandal forced NBC to fire Albert before the start of the 1997–1998 season. To replace Albert, NBC tapped studio host Bob Costas for play-by-play. Matt Guokas did not return to his post as main color commentator, and was replaced by NBA legend Isiah Thomas; Costas was replaced on the pre-game show by Hannah Storm. Midway through the season, Costas and Thomas were joined by recently fired Detroit Pistons coach Doug Collins. Collins served to take some weight off Thomas, who was considered by some to be uncomfortable in the role of lead analyst. Thomas, in particular, was singled out for his soft voice and often stammered analysis.

The team of Costas, Thomas and Collins worked the major games that season including the 1998 NBA Finals (which set an all-time ratings record for the NBA). Mike Breen, who played second fiddle to Albert on MSG Network's New York Knicks broadcasts, was hired to do select playoff games that year and was later promoted to backup announcer status.

During its twelve-year run, the NBA on NBC experienced ratings highs and lows for the NBA. In the 1990s, the NBA Finals ratings were stellar, with the exception of 1999 Finals. In 1998, the NBA set a Finals ratings record, with an 18.7 household rating for the second Chicago Bulls–Utah Jazz series, the last championship run by the Michael Jordan-led Bulls. The very next year (after a lockout which erased part of the season), the ratings for the 1999 Finals plummeted, marking the beginning of an ongoing period of lower viewership for the league's game telecasts.

- 1998: The Finals between the Chicago Bulls and the Utah Jazz was the highest rated NBA Finals ever (18.7 percent rating over six games). Game 6 registered a 22.3 Nielsen rating with a 38 share and attracted 72 million viewers and became the highest rated game in the history of the NBA. The previous record was a 21.2 rating and 37 share for Game 7 of the 1988 NBA Finals between the Los Angeles Lakers and Detroit Pistons.

=== 1999 ===
For the 1998–99 season, Thomas was moved to the studio, while Costas and Collins made up the lead team. The 1998–1999 season, which was marred by a lengthy lockout (which resulted in the regular season being shortened to 50 games) included the low-rated 1999 NBA Finals between the San Antonio Spurs and the New York Knicks. Albert was brought back for the 1999–2000 season, making a return which included calling that year's lead Christmas Day game between the San Antonio Spurs and the Los Angeles Lakers from Staples Center.

After the 1999 Finals, NBC used "Fly Away" by Lenny Kravitz for their montage.

For the 1999-2000 NBA season, TBS shifted its primetime game telecasts from Wednesdays to Mondays. For the 2000–2001 NBA season, the broadcasts were moved to Tuesdays, while TNT assumed rights to Wednesday and Thursday evening games.

- The retirement of Michael Jordan set in motion the decline in NBA ratings which continued for several years. Ratings for the 1999 NBA Finals (which in fairness, came after a lockout shortened season) were down significantly from the previous year, from an 18.7 to an 11.3. Primetime regular season games, which had become fairly routine (and highly rated) during the Jordan years, set record lows for NBC once Jordan retired. With the rise of the Los Angeles Lakers in the early part of the 2000s (decade), ratings improved, but never to the level of the 1980s or 1990s. The highest NBA Finals ratings on NBC after Jordan left was the 2001 Finals, which featured the dominant and then-defending champion Lakers with Shaquille O'Neal and Kobe Bryant versus the polarizing Allen Iverson and the underdog Philadelphia 76ers. The ratings for that series were a 12.1, still down 35 percent from 1998. NBC's last Finals, in 2002, came after a resurgence in playoff ratings (including a 14.2 rating for Game 7 of the Western Conference Finals). However, the Finals itself registered the lowest ratings the event had seen since 1981, topping out at a 10.2 average.

== See also ==
- List of NBA Finals broadcasters § 1990s
- List of NBA All-Star Game broadcasters#1990s
- List of NBA on NBC broadcasters
- List of NBA on TNT commentators
- NBA on television in the 1950s
  - NBA on television in the 1960s
  - NBA on television in the 1970s
  - NBA on television in the 1980s
  - NBA on television in the 2000s
  - NBA on television in the 2010s
