= NBA on television in the 1970s =

ABC gained the NBA in 1964, the network aired its first NBA game on January 3, 1965, but lost the broadcast rights to CBS after the 1972–73 season with the initial tenure ending on May 10, 1973. As the national broadcaster of the NBA, CBS aired NBA games from the 1973-74 until the 1989–90 season, during which the early 1980s is notoriously known as the tape delay playoff era.

NBA entered the cable territory in 1979 when USA Network signed a three-year $1.5 million deal and extended for two years until the 1983-84 season, ESPN also had a brief affair with NBA from 1982 to 1984.

== 1970-1973 ==
For much of the 1960s, ABC only televised Sunday afternoon games, including during the NBA Playoffs. This meant that ABC did not have to televise a potential NBA Finals deciding game if it were played on a weeknight. In 1969, ABC did televise Game 7 of the Los Angeles Lakers–Boston Celtics series in prime time on a weeknight. The following season, ABC aired the 1970 NBA Finals in its entirety, making it the first Finals series to have all games televised nationally.

Commentators for the original NBA on ABC included play-by-play announcers Keith Jackson and Chris Schenkel, and analysts Jack Twyman, Bob Cousy and Bill Russell.

Jack Twyman remained as color commentator for the broadcasts up until 1971, when the position was assumed by Bill Russell. ABC lost the broadcast rights to the NBA to CBS after the 1972–73 season, with the network's initial tenure with the league ending with its last NBA Finals game on May 10, 1973.

- 1970: The first NBA Finals to be nationally televised in full.
  - ABC's coverage of Game 7 was blacked out on WABC-TV in the New York area. Play-by-play man Chris Schenkel made an announcement during the broadcast that the game would be rebroadcast in New York at 11:30 p.m. ET. The game was shown live on the MSG Network in New York City, which was then only available in about 25,000 cable households in Manhattan.

== 1973-1976 ==
During CBS' first few years of covering the NBA, CBS was accused of mishandling their NBA telecasts. Among the criticisms included CBS playing too much loud music, the lack of stability with the announcers, regionalizing telecasts (thus fragmenting the ratings even further), billing games as being between star players instead of teams, and devoting too much attention to the slam dunk in instant replays. Regular features included a pre-game show that consisted of mini-teams of celebrities, and active and former NBA players competing against each other, and a halftime show called Horse.

The NBA eventually took notice of the criticisms and managed to persuade CBS to eliminate its original halftime show. In its place, came human-interest shows about the players (similar to the ones seen on the network's NFL pre-game The NFL Today). There also was a possibility that CBS would start televising a single national game on Sunday afternoons.

Other adjustments that CBS made in hopes of improving its coverage included hiring reporter Sonny Hill to cover the league on a full-time basis. CBS also put microphones and cameras on team huddles to allow viewers to see and hear coaches at work. Finally, CBS introduced a halftime segment called Red Auerbach on Roundball, featuring the Hall of Fame Boston Celtics coach. The segment intended to not only educate CBS' viewers about the complexities of the pro game, but also to teach young players how to improve their skills. They also subtly introduced audiences to an all-star team based on Auerbach's criteria such as screening and passing. In a Red on Roundball halftime segment which appeared on CBS' NBA telecasts in the 1973–74 season, Auerbach and referee Mendy Rudolph discussed and demonstrated the practice of flopping with obvious disapproval.

From 1975 to 1979, CBS aired all NBA Finals games live (usually during the afternoon); live NBA Finals game coverage on the network resumed in 1982. During this era, CBS aired weeknight playoff games from earlier rounds on tape delay at 11:30 p.m. Eastern Time (airing games live when the game site was in the Pacific Time Zone). CBS continued this practice until at least the mid-1980s.

CBS did not want sportscasters to give the final score on the late-evening newscasts aired by its local affiliates. The network preferred the games to not be over by that time if they were going to be aired on tape later that night. Most CBS games were either 8:30 or 9:00 p.m. local starts.

- 1976 NBA Finals: There were three days of rest between Game 1 Sunday, May 23 and Game 2 Thursday, May 27, so that CBS would not have to count an NBA game in the Nielsen ratings for the May sweeps period. The 1976 May sweeps period ended Wednesday, May 26.
  - Game 3 tipped off at 10:30 a.m. MST to allow CBS to cover The Memorial golf tournament following the game. Church attendance that Sunday was sharply lower across Arizona, drawing an angry response from many clergy throughout the state.
  - CBS play-by-play announcer Brent Musburger, in a Fall 2009 interview with ESPN, said that he and color announcer Rick Barry were rooting for Phoenix to win Games 3, 4, and 6, although Barry's Golden State Warriors were eliminated by the Suns in the Western Conference finals. Musburger said that this was because he and Barry were paid by the game. Since the Series was 2-0 Boston after the first two games, Musburger and Barry wanted the Suns to win the next two games to tie the series (likewise with Game 6). Boston fans, unaware of Musburger's and Barry's motivations, were upset with the announcing crew because of their apparent favoritism.

== 1976-1977 ==
During the 1976–77 season, the NBA's first after the ABA–NBA merger brought the American Basketball Association into the league, CBS held a slam dunk contest that ran during halftime of the Game of the Week telecasts. Don Criqui was the host of this particular competition. The final, which pitted Larry McNeill of the Golden State Warriors against eventual winner Darnell "Dr. Dunk" Hillman of the Indiana Pacers, took place during Game 6 of the 1977 NBA Finals. At the time of the final, Hillman's rights had been traded to the New York Nets, but he had not yet signed a contract. Since he was not officially a member of any NBA team, instead of wearing a jersey, he competed in a plain white tank top. Then for the post-competition interview, Hillman donned a shirt with the words "Bottle Shoppe" – the name of an Indianapolis liquor store, which is still in existence, and was the sponsor of a city parks softball league team for which Hillman played left field (and the only team he was a member of at the time). Other players to compete in the slam dunk tournament included Julius Erving, George Gervin, Kareem Abdul-Jabbar and Moses Malone. CBS, anxious for star power, also gave David Thompson the opportunity to be eliminated three times.

- 1977 NBA Finals: The post-game trophy presentation following Game 6 was never aired because CBS decided to air the Kemper Open following the game. Initially CBS wanted a 10:30 a.m. PT start to accommodate the golf tournament but the NBA refused, instead settling for the 12:00 p.m. PT start time.

== 1977-1978 ==
During the 1977–78 season, CBS held a H-O-R-S-E competition at halftime of the Game of the Week telecasts. Again, Don Criqui hosted with Mendy Rudolph officiating. 32 players, including Rick Barry, Pete Maravich, George Gervin, JoJo White, Doug Collins, Paul Westphal and Bob McAdoo, competed in a round-robin single-elimination tournament each week. Barry was eliminated in the first round by journeyman Earl Tatum of the Los Angeles Lakers. Maravich and Westphal made it all the way to the final, which was scheduled to take place at halftime of Game 2 of the 1978 NBA Finals. However, Maravich was injured and unavailable, so CBS instead had Westphal shoot a free-throw against "Bag-Man" (who was actually Rick Barry, who was on the announcing team, wearing a paper sack over his head). Westphal, with a bag over his head as well, made the free throw while Barry missed, and CBS awarded him the trophy.

By 1978, NBC aired Saturday afternoon college basketball games, while CBS aired NBA doubleheaders on Sunday afternoons, and most independent stations aired local professional and college games. CBS started to fear that their ratings suffered as a result of too many basketball games being aired on television at once. As an experiment of sorts, the network decided to air the first two games of the Conference finals at 11:30 p.m. Eastern Standard Time.

== 1978-1979 ==
In 1979, Games 2 and 5 of the Eastern Conference finals were televised live, while Game 7 was broadcast on tape delay. Games 3 and 6 of the Western Conference finals aired live, while Games 2, 5 and 7 were televised via tape delay. Games 6 and 7 of the 1979 NBA Finals would have been televised live (at 3:30 p.m. on a Sunday and then 9:00 p.m. on the following Tuesday), but were unnecessary.

== See also ==
- List_of_NBA_Finals_broadcasters#1970s
- List_of_NBA_All-Star_Game_broadcasters#1970s
- List of NBA on ABC commentators
- NBA on television in the 1950s
  - NBA on television in the 1960s
  - NBA on television in the 1980s
  - NBA on television in the 1990s
  - NBA on television in the 2000s
  - NBA on television in the 2010s
