= NBA on television in the 2010s =

Upon expiration of the contract in 2002, the league signed an agreement with ABC, which began airing games in the 2002-03 season. NBC had made a four-year $1.3 billion ($330 million/year) bid in the spring of 2002 to renew its NBA rights, but the league instead went to ESPN and ABC with a six-year deal worth $2.4 billion ($400 million/year), a total of $4.6 billion ($766 million/year) when adding the cable deal with Turner Sports.

Partially due to the retirement of Michael Jordan, the league suffered ratings decline after ESPN and ABC took over the rights. The NBA extended its national TV package on June 27, 2007, worth eight-year $7.4 billion ($930 million/year) through the 2015–16 season, during which the league had its new resurgence leading by renewed Celtics–Lakers rivalry and LeBron James. On October 6, 2014, NBA announced a nine-year $24 billion ($2.7 billion/year) extension with ESPN, ABC and Turner Sports beginning with the 2016–17 season and running through the 2024–25 season - the second most expensive media rights in the world after NFL and on a par with Premier League in annual rights fee from 2016–17 to 2018–19 season.

In the summer of 1987, Turner Broadcasting System signed a new joint broadcast contract between TBS and TNT to split broadcast NBA games starting from the 1988-89 season. TNT held rights to broadcast the NBA draft, most NBA regular season and playoff games, while TBS only aired single games or doubleheaders once a week. The 2001-02 season would mark the final year of regular NBA coverage on TBS, Turner Sports signed a new NBA television contract in which TNT would assume rights to the company's NBA package while TBS would discontinue game coverage altogether. In recent years however, TBS has served as an overflow feed during the playoffs while also simulcasting the 2015, 2016, and 2017 NBA All-Star Game. Subsequently ESPN regained the NBA in 2002-03 season and took over TBS's half of cable television rights.

== Year-by-year summary ==
=== 2010 ===
In addition, unlike NBC or its preceding rightsholder CBS, ABC does not televise the NBA All-Star Game (with TNT instead holding the exclusive television rights to the game itself and most other events held during All-Star Weekend). Also unlike the other networks, ABC rarely televises either of the NBA's Conference Finals series. TNT airs one Conference Final exclusively each year (the Western Conference Finals in 2004, 2006, 2008, 2010, 2012, 2014, 2016, 2018, 2020, 2022 and the Eastern Conference Finals in 2003, 2005, 2007, 2009, 2011, 2013, 2015, 2017, 2019, 2021 while ESPN will get the other. With the exception of 2003, 2004, 2011, 2012, 2015, 2016, 2019, 2020 (when the network did not air any games from that round at all), ABC airs Conference Final matches – whichever one to which ESPN holds the rights in a given year – held on weekends. Due to the checkerboard schedule of the NBA Playoffs (in which games are scheduled every other day), this is limited to one game per Conference Final, as series do not often reach a sixth or seventh game (for example, the network aired only Game 3 of the 2009 Western Conference Finals; ABC was scheduled to air the Sunday Game 7 of the series, however, the Los Angeles Lakers won the series in Game 6).

=== 2011 ===
On May 11, 2011, Turner Sports (this includes TBS) broadcast its 1,000th playoff telecast.

In July 2011, it was announced that Shaquille O'Neal would join TNT as an analyst and he signed a multi-year agreement.

Normally the TNT studio crew of Ernie Johnson, Kenny Smith and Charles Barkley would stay in the TNT Atlanta studios for all of the regular season and the first two rounds of the playoffs. However, in the 2010-11 NBA season the studio crew started taking their pre-game, halftime and Inside the NBA shows on the road in the regular season, specifically select games involving the Miami Heat on TNT, due to the heightened media coverage surrounding the Heat's acquisitions of LeBron James and Chris Bosh. The substitute studio hosts will also be on hand for Inside the NBA and the other game's pre-game and halftime presentations; the crew consists of Matt Winer, Chris Webber and Kevin McHale.

ABC was criticized for focusing its coverage on a select number of teams, particularly the decision to broadcast a Lakers-Heat game on its Christmas Day schedule for three consecutive years. However, for 2007, ABC decided to break this tradition by instead having the Heat, for the fourth straight time, appear on Christmas Day facing the 2007 Eastern Conference Champions, the Cleveland Cavaliers. In 2008, the Boston Celtics replaced the Heat on the Christmas Day schedule, and faced the Los Angeles Lakers; and in 2009, the Cavaliers played the Lakers on Christmas Day. However, the Heat-Lakers Christmas Day special would make its return in the 2010–11 NBA season, as a result of LeBron James' recent move from the Cleveland franchise to Miami. For the 2011–12 NBA season, the Lakers and Heat played again on Christmas Day, but against separate opponents. The Lakers played the Chicago Bulls, while the Heat played the Dallas Mavericks in a rematch of the 2011 NBA Finals; both the Bulls and Mavericks made their ABC Christmas Day debuts, which also acted as the league's opening day that season due to the 2011 NBA lockout delaying the start of the season. In the case of the latter, ABC aired the pre-game championship ring and banner ceremony for the Mavericks, which marked the first time in NBA history a national broadcast network televised the ceremony.

For the 2011 NBA postseason, ESPN used an updated composition of the "Fast Break" theme music for the postseason, yet the original composition was still used for the regular season through the 2015-16 NBA season.

=== 2013 ===
During the 2013 Western Conference Finals, a new graphics package debuted for ESPN's NBA telecasts. The graphics featured 3-dimensional renderings of the team logos, along with the use of specific themes and backgrounds to accompany each of them. During the 2015 NBA Finals, the graphics were updated to reflect the new design used in ESPN's NBA Countdown broadcasts. However, during 2015-16 NBA season, the graphics were reverted to the previous package used since 2013. On May 17, 2016, the graphics, which were first seen during the previous year's championship, were used again for the 2016 Eastern Conference Finals and NBA Finals.

=== 2015 ===
During the 2015 NBA Finals, the graphics were updated with gold coloring, patterned backgrounds, and a modern, unified font. At the start of the 2015–16 season however, ESPN reverted to the banner used since 2013.

=== 2016 ===
On July 17, 2015, ESPN announced that ABC would add a series of eight of Saturday night games to its slate of broadcasts in the 2015–16 season. The first of these games will air on January 23, 2016, and will air mostly bi-weekly until the end of the regular season. As a result of this change, ABC will no longer have regular Sunday doubleheaders.

For the 2015–16 season, the NBA and Turner Sports partnered with NextVR to stream the Warriors vs. Pelicans, the first-ever game to be broadcast live in virtual reality.

Beginning with the 2016 NBA preseason on October 4, 2016, ABC's graphics were updated again, this time, they are formatted for the full 16:9 letterbox presentation. The score bar, which is significantly larger than the previous one (used since the 2013 Western Conference Finals), was given a complete overhaul, with a numerical representation of timeouts replacing the "lights" used since the 2010–11 season and a permanent "stats bar" being moved to the right side of the score bar. The new, co-branded NBA on ESPN logo is now seen as an overlay on the upper left hand corner of the 16:9 screen. As was the case the previous two years, the gold coloring and patterned backgrounds were used again for the 2017 NBA Finals. Notably, this is the first time that both ESPN and ABC have used the full 16:9 frame for its graphics in the networks' NBA coverage.

As of April 2015, ABC's broadcast team currently consists of Mike Breen, Mark Jackson and Jeff Van Gundy, while the secondary broadcast team consists of Mike Tirico and Hubie Brown, with either Mark Jones, Ryan Ruocco or Dave Pasch filling in when Tirico has other commitments. The NBA Countdown studio team consists of host Sage Steele, and analysts Jalen Rose and Doug Collins. ABC's second team of Tirico and Brown also comprise the lead team for NBA Finals coverage on ESPN Radio, with Kevin Calabro subbing in for Tirico on some occasions.

Jackson briefly left the broadcast booth to serve as head coach of the Golden State Warriors from 2011 to 2014. Prior to the 2011–12 season, ABC reassigned Stuart Scott to another role while the studio team worked without a main host in a more free-flowing approach. This experiment ended prior to the 2013–14 season, when Sage Steele became the lead host of Countdown. Magic Johnson, Jon Barry, Michael Wilbon, Bill Simmons, and Chris Broussard have previously served as analysts for NBA Countdown.

=== 2017 ===
For the 2016–17 season, Mark Jones replaced Mike Tirico as part of the secondary broadcast team on ABC with Hubie Brown as Tirico left for NBC. Also, Doug Collins left NBA Countdown and joined ESPN's roster of game analysts, returning to a position he previously held while working with NBC and TNT. Steele was replaced as host by Michelle Beadle during the season.

Also, for the 2016-17 NBA season, ESPN used another updated composition of the "Fast Break" theme music. This time, for the regular season, replacing the original composition that was first used by ABC since the 2004–05 season and by ESPN two seasons later. ESPN introduced a revamped on-air presentation and branding for its NBA coverage, developed with the creative agency Big Block, as well as a new logo. The new design was inspired by "premium" consumer brands, and places a heavier focus on team logos and colors as the basis of its design, as opposed to visual environments and settings. When introduced during the pre-season, the new package used a noticeably large scorebar, although it has since been reduced in size.

For the 2016–17 season, TNT announced that it would air a new series of Monday-night doubleheaders during the later half of the season, beginning on January 16, 2017. Monday night games from February 27 to March 27 were branded as Players Only broadcasts, featuring only former NBA players and without a traditional play-by-play announcer. Additionally, TNT announced that it would hold a "Road Show" tour in various cities throughout the season, which will feature fan experiences and festivities, and a live broadcast of Inside the NBA on-location. The tour will begin in Cleveland outside the Quicken Loans Arena, host of TNT's opening night game featuring the Cleveland Cavaliers.

TNT normally aired NBA Christmas Day games only if it falls on a Thursday (except during the 2011–12 season). However, the network announced that they would air a Christmas Day game on December 25, 2017 (a Monday) featuring the Minnesota Timberwolves and the Los Angeles Lakers. It also marked the first time that the Inside the NBA crew of Ernie Johnson, Kenny Smith, Charles Barkley and Shaquille O'Neal called the game. TNT also announced that the Players Only games will now air every Tuesday starting January 23; the franchise also expanded to include Tuesday night games on NBA TV during the first half of the season.

=== 2018 ===
For the 2017–18 season, the stat bar on ABC is only shown at the beginning of the game and after commercial breaks.

=== 2019 ===
For the 2019 Finals (the first to feature the Toronto Raptors), TSN and Sportsnet, the main Canadian rightsholders of both the NBA and the Raptors, were permitted to broadcast distinct Canadian telecasts, in addition to the ABC telecast being simulcast on their co-owned broadcast networks. Telecasts on both TSN and Sportsnet use a common technical crew employed by Raptors team owner Maple Leaf Sports & Entertainment.

== See also ==
- List of NBA Finals broadcasters § 2010s
- List of NBA All-Star Game broadcasters § 2010s
- List of NBA on ABC commentators
- List of NBA on ESPN broadcasters
- List of NBA on TNT commentators
- NBA on television in the 1950s
- NBA on television in the 1960s
- NBA on television in the 1970s
- NBA on television in the 1990s
- NBA on television in the 2000s
