= 2003 NBA Finals =

2003 basketball championship series

Team	Coach	Wins
San Antonio Spurs	Gregg Popovich	4
New Jersey Nets	Byron Scott	2
- Dates: June 4–15
- MVP: Tim Duncan (San Antonio Spurs)
- Hall of Famers: Spurs; Tim Duncan (2020); Manu Ginóbili (2022); Tony Parker (2023); David Robinson (2009); Nets; Jason Kidd (2018); Dikembe Mutombo (2015); Coaches: Gregg Popovich (2023); Officials: Dick Bavetta (2015); Danny Crawford (2025)
- Eastern finals: Nets defeated Pistons, 4–0
- Western finals: Spurs defeated Mavericks, 4–2

The 2003 NBA Finals was the championship series of the National Basketball Association's (NBA) 2002–03 season, and the culmination of the season's playoffs. The Western Conference champion San Antonio Spurs played the Eastern Conference champion New Jersey Nets for the title, with the Spurs holding home court advantage. The series was played under a best-of-seven format.

The Spurs defeated the Nets to win the series 4–2 for their second championship. Spurs forward Tim Duncan was named the Most Valuable Player of the championship series. The series was broadcast on U.S. television on ABC, with Brad Nessler, Bill Walton and Tom Tolbert announcing.

== Background ==
The 2002–03 season had already started as a memorable one for the San Antonio Spurs, as it was the team's first season in their new arena, the SBC Center (now the Frost Bank Center). However, as this season was one of beginnings, it was also one of endings. During the season, Spurs star David Robinson announced that it was his last season. The NBA Finals also marked the end of Steve Kerr's career as well—he was on the Spurs, having already won three titles with the Chicago Bulls.

Over the last few seasons, injuries had slowed down Robinson's productivity to the point where he missed 18 games in his final season while averaging only 8.5 points per game. Nevertheless, Robinson retired holding Spurs franchise records in points, rebounds, steals and blocks. The Spurs had a very successful season, finishing 60–22, tying for the best record in the NBA that year.

The playoffs started off shaky for the Spurs as they lost game 1 of the first-round series against the Phoenix Suns in overtime. However, the Spurs bounced back to take the series in six games. The second round put the Spurs face-to-face with the three-time defending champion Los Angeles Lakers. After splitting the first four games, the Spurs eked out a win in game 5, benefitting from a rare, last-second in-and-out miss from the Lakers' clutch-shooter Robert Horry (who helped the Spurs win a title two years later). The Spurs eventually disposed of the Lakers in game 6, ending the Lakers' championship run. In the conference finals, the Spurs faced their in-state nemesis, the Dallas Mavericks. The Spurs started off slow again, losing game 1 by three points, but took control of the series from there, taking the next three straight. After losing game 5 at home 103–91, the Spurs came from 15 points down in the fourth quarter in game 6, as Steve Kerr buried four three-pointers in a row to take the series in six games with a 90–78 win in Dallas, advancing to their second NBA Finals in franchise history.

In the meantime the New Jersey Nets, who lost to the Lakers in the finals the previous year, were out to prove that they were serious title contenders, despite the lack of competition in the Eastern Conference. The Nets finished the regular season 49–33, good enough to win the Atlantic Division and clinch the number 2 seed in the East. After splitting the first four games with the Milwaukee Bucks in the first round, the Nets took control, winning the series in six games. From then on, the Nets had no trouble making a return to the NBA Finals, sweeping the Boston Celtics and the Detroit Pistons to win their second straight Eastern Conference championship. With their 49–33 record, the 2003 Nets were the last team with under 50 wins to reach the NBA Finals in a fully-played season until the 2022-23 Miami Heat, who went 44–38 in the regular season.

=== Road to the Finals ===
San Antonio Spurs (Western Conference champion)		New Jersey Nets (Eastern Conference champion)
# / Western Conference; # / Team / W / L / PCT / GB; 1 / z-San Antonio Spurs / 60 / 22 / .732 / –; 2 / y-Sacramento Kings / 59 / 23 / .720 / 1; 3 / x-Dallas Mavericks / 60 / 22 / .732 / –; 4 / x-Minnesota Timberwolves / 51 / 31 / .622 / 9; 5 / x-Los Angeles Lakers / 50 / 32 / .610 / 10; 6 / x-Portland Trail Blazers / 50 / 32 / .610 / 10; 7 / x-Utah Jazz / 47 / 35 / .573 / 13; 8 / x-Phoenix Suns / 44 / 38 / .537 / 16; 9 / e-Houston Rockets / 43 / 39 / .524 / 17; 10 / e-Seattle SuperSonics / 40 / 42 / .488 / 20; 11 / e-Golden State Warriors / 38 / 44 / .463 / 22; 12 / e-Memphis Grizzlies / 28 / 54 / .341 / 32; 13 / e-Los Angeles Clippers / 27 / 55 / .329 / 33; 14 / e-Denver Nuggets / 17 / 65 / .207 / 43; 1st seed in the West, best league record	Regular season	# / Eastern Conference; # / Team / W / L / PCT / GB; 1 / c-Detroit Pistons / 50 / 32 / .610 / –; 2 / y-New Jersey Nets / 49 / 33 / .598 / 1; 3 / x-Indiana Pacers / 48 / 34 / .585 / 2; 4 / x-Philadelphia 76ers / 48 / 34 / .585 / 2; 5 / x-New Orleans Hornets / 47 / 35 / .573 / 3; 6 / x-Boston Celtics / 44 / 38 / .537 / 6; 7 / x-Milwaukee Bucks / 42 / 40 / .512 / 8; 8 / x-Orlando Magic / 42 / 40 / .512 / 8; 9 / e-New York Knicks / 37 / 45 / .451 / 13; 10 / e-Washington Wizards / 37 / 45 / .451 / 13; 11 / e-Atlanta Hawks / 35 / 47 / .427 / 15; 12 / e-Chicago Bulls / 30 / 52 / .366 / 20; 13 / e-Miami Heat / 25 / 57 / .305 / 25; 14 / e-Toronto Raptors / 24 / 58 / .293 / 26; 15 / e-Cleveland Cavaliers / 17 / 65 / .207 / 33; 2nd seed in the East, 8th best league record
Defeated the (8) Phoenix Suns, 4–2	First round	Defeated the (7) Milwaukee Bucks, 4–2
Defeated the (5) Los Angeles Lakers, 4–2	Conference semifinals	Defeated the (6) Boston Celtics, 4–0
Defeated the (3) Dallas Mavericks, 4–2	Conference finals	Defeated the (1) Detroit Pistons, 4–0

=== Regular season series ===
Both teams split the two meetings, each won by the home team:

November 13, 2002

San Antonio Spurs 82, New Jersey Nets 91

Continental Airlines Arena, East Rutherford, New Jersey

March 6, 2003

New Jersey Nets 78, San Antonio Spurs 92

SBC Center, San Antonio, Texas

== Rosters ==
=== San Antonio Spurs ===
2002–03 San Antonio Spurs roster
Players

Pos.	No.	Player	Height	Weight	DOB	From
C	34	Mengke Bateer	6 ft 11 in (2.11 m)	290 lb (132 kg)	1975–11–20	China
F	12	Bruce Bowen	6 ft 7 in (2.01 m)	200 lb (91 kg)	1971–06–14	Cal State Fullerton
G	10	Speedy Claxton	5 ft 11 in (1.80 m)	166 lb (75 kg)	1978–05–08	Hofstra
F/C	21	Tim Duncan	6 ft 11 in (2.11 m)	255 lb (116 kg)	1976–04–25	Wake Forest
F	35	Danny Ferry	6 ft 10 in (2.08 m)	235 lb (107 kg)	1966–10–17	Duke
G	20	Manu Ginóbili	6 ft 6 in (1.98 m)	200 lb (91 kg)	1977–07–28	Argentina
F	3	Stephen Jackson	6 ft 8 in (2.03 m)	220 lb (100 kg)	1978–04–05	Butler CC
G	25	Steve Kerr	6 ft 3 in (1.91 m)	175 lb (79 kg)	1965–09–27	Arizona
G	9	Tony Parker	6 ft 2 in (1.88 m)	185 lb (84 kg)	1982–05–17	France
C	50	David Robinson	7 ft 1 in (2.16 m)	235 lb (107 kg)	1965–08–06	Navy
F	31	Malik Rose	6 ft 7 in (2.01 m)	250 lb (113 kg)	1974–11–23	Drexel
G	8	Steve Smith	6 ft 7 in (2.01 m)	200 lb (91 kg)	1969–03–31	Michigan State
F/C	42	Kevin Willis	7 ft 0 in (2.13 m)	245 lb (111 kg)	1962–09–06	Michigan State

Coaches
Head coach
- Gregg Popovich (Air Force)
Assistant(s)
- Mike Brown (San Diego)
- P. J. Carlesimo (Fordham)
- Mike Budenholzer (Pomona)
- Joe Prunty (Cal Poly)

Legend
- (DP) Unsigned draft pick
- (FA) Free agent
- (S) Suspended
- Injured

Roster
Updated: June 5, 2019

=== New Jersey Nets ===
2002–03 New Jersey Nets roster
Players

Pos.	No.	Player	Height	Weight	DOB	From
G	1	Brandon Armstrong	6 ft 5 in (1.96 m)	188 lb (85 kg)	1980–06–16	Pepperdine
C	35	Jason Collins	7 ft 0 in (2.13 m)	255 lb (116 kg)	1978–12–02	Stanford
G	12	Lucious Harris	6 ft 5 in (1.96 m)	190 lb (86 kg)	1970–12–18	Long Beach State
F	24	Richard Jefferson	6 ft 7 in (2.01 m)	222 lb (101 kg)	1980–06–21	Arizona
G	2	Anthony Johnson	6 ft 3 in (1.91 m)	190 lb (86 kg)	1974–10–02	College of Charleston
G	5	Jason Kidd	6 ft 4 in (1.93 m)	204 lb (93 kg)	1973–03–23	California
G	30	Kerry Kittles	6 ft 5 in (1.96 m)	179 lb (81 kg)	1974–06–12	Villanova
F	13	Donny Marshall	6 ft 7 in (2.01 m)	230 lb (104 kg)	1972–07–17	Connecticut
F	6	Kenyon Martin	6 ft 9 in (2.06 m)	234 lb (106 kg)	1977–12–30	Cincinnati
C	55	Dikembe Mutombo	7 ft 2 in (2.18 m)	245 lb (111 kg)	1966–06–25	Georgetown
F	54	Rodney Rogers	6 ft 7 in (2.01 m)	235 lb (107 kg)	1971–06–20	Wake Forest
F	21	Brian Scalabrine	6 ft 9 in (2.06 m)	241 lb (109 kg)	1978–03–18	USC
G	8	Tamar Slay	6 ft 8 in (2.03 m)	215 lb (98 kg)	1980–04–02	Marshall
C	34	Aaron Williams	6 ft 9 in (2.06 m)	220 lb (100 kg)	1971–10–02	Xavier

Coaches
Head coach
- Byron Scott (Arizona State)
Assistant(s)
- Lawrence Frank (Indiana)
- Eddie Jordan (Rutgers)
- Mike O'Koren (North Carolina)

Legend
- (DP) Unsigned draft pick
- (FA) Free agent
- (S) Suspended
- Injured

Roster
Updated: June 5, 2019

== Series summary ==
Game	Date	Home team	Result	Road team
Game 1	June 4	San Antonio Spurs	101–89 (1–0)	New Jersey Nets
Game 2	June 6	San Antonio Spurs	85–87 (1–1)	New Jersey Nets
Game 3	June 8	New Jersey Nets	79–84 (1–2)	San Antonio Spurs
Game 4	June 11	New Jersey Nets	77–76 (2–2)	San Antonio Spurs
Game 5	June 13	New Jersey Nets	83–93 (2–3)	San Antonio Spurs
Game 6	June 15	San Antonio Spurs	88–77 (4–2)	New Jersey Nets

The Finals were played using a 2–3–2 site format, where the first two and last two games are held at the team with home court advantage. The NBA, after experimenting in the early years, restored this original format for the Finals in 1985. So far, the other playoff series are still running on a 2–2–1–1–1 site format.

Game 4 at Continental Airlines Arena was a sellout.

This was the last Finals' series to be played on a Wednesday–Friday–Sunday rotation, which was used starting in 1991 when NBC began carrying the NBA. Starting with the 2004 NBA Finals, all games were played on Thursday–Sunday–Tuesday format until 2016, when it was changed to allow for two days off each time teams traveled.

== Game summaries ==
All times listed below are Eastern Daylight Time. If the venue is located in a different time zone, the local time is also given.

=== Game 1 ===
ABC

June 4
8:30 pm (7:30 pm CDT)

Recap

New Jersey Nets 89, San Antonio Spurs 101
Scoring by quarter: 21–18, 21–24, 17–32, 30–27
Pts: Kenyon Martin 21; Rebs: Kenyon Martin 12; Asts: Jason Kidd 10	Pts: Tim Duncan 32; Rebs: Tim Duncan 20; Asts: Tim Duncan 6
San Antonio leads series, 1–0

SBC Center, San Antonio, Texas
Referees: Dick Bavetta, Joe Crawford, Joe DeRosa

=== Game 2 ===
ABC

June 6
8:30 pm (7:30 pm CDT)

Recap

New Jersey Nets 87, San Antonio Spurs 85
Scoring by quarter: 19–18, 22–17, 25–21, 21–29
Pts: Jason Kidd 30; Rebs: Kidd, Harris 7 each Asts: Kenyon Martin 4	Pts: Tony Parker 21; Rebs: Tim Duncan 12; Asts: Tony Parker 5
Series tied, 1–1

SBC Center, San Antonio, Texas
Referees: Dan Crawford, Bob Delaney, Bennett Salvatore

=== Game 3 ===
ABC

June 8
8:30 pm

Recap

San Antonio Spurs 84, New Jersey Nets 79
Scoring by quarter: 15–21, 18–9, 21–27, 30–22
Pts: Tony Parker 26; Rebs: Tim Duncan 16; Asts: Tim Duncan 7	Pts: Kenyon Martin 23; Rebs: Kenyon Martin 11; Asts: Jason Kidd 11
San Antonio leads series, 2–1

Continental Airlines Arena, East Rutherford, New Jersey
Referees: Ron Garretson, Steve Javie, Jack Nies

=== Game 4 ===
ABC

June 11
8:30 pm

Recap

San Antonio Spurs 76, New Jersey Nets 77
Scoring by quarter: 18–16, 16–29, 23–11, 19–21
Pts: Tim Duncan 23; Rebs: Tim Duncan 17; Asts: Parker, Jackson 3 each	Pts: Kenyon Martin 20; Rebs: Kenyon Martin 13; Asts: Jason Kidd 9
Series tied, 2–2

Continental Airlines Arena, East Rutherford, New Jersey
Referees: Mike Callahan, Bernie Fryer, Eddie Rush

=== Game 5 ===
ABC

June 13
8:30 pm

Recap

San Antonio Spurs 93, New Jersey Nets 83
Scoring by quarter: 19–18, 23–16, 24–23, 27–26
Pts: Tim Duncan 29; Rebs: Tim Duncan 17; Asts: Duncan, Parker 4 each	Pts: Jason Kidd 29; Rebs: Kenyon Martin 9 Asts: Jason Kidd 7
San Antonio leads series, 3–2

Continental Airlines Arena, East Rutherford, New Jersey
Referees: Dick Bavetta, Joe Crawford, Bennett Salvatore

=== Game 6 ===
ABC

June 15
8:30 pm (7:30 pm CDT)

Recap

New Jersey Nets 77, San Antonio Spurs 88
Scoring by quarter: 25–17, 16–21, 22–19, 14–31
Pts: Jason Kidd 21; Rebs: Kenyon Martin 10; Asts: Jason Kidd 7	Pts: Tim Duncan 21; Rebs: Tim Duncan 20; Asts: Tim Duncan 10
San Antonio wins NBA Finals, 4–2

SBC Center, San Antonio, Texas
Referees: Dan Crawford, Bob Delaney, Ron Garretson

External videos
- Full game broadcast by ABC on YouTube

== Overview ==
While the series received the usual hype of any Finals, it was not heavily anticipated due to the absence of the Lakers, who had won the previous three finals. The Spurs did have a star in Tim Duncan, but at the time he was criticized as being boring compared to flashier players such as Kobe Bryant and Shaquille O'Neal.

The series largely centered on the half-court offense and defense of each team, with only one team breaking 100 points in the series. The Nets constantly double-teamed Duncan, often allowing him to find open teammates.

Nets point guard Jason Kidd, second to Duncan in MVP voting during the 2003 season, was in the last year of his contract with the team, leading to speculation that the Spurs, a team that could afford to sign him, would pursue him in the free agency following the 2003 Finals despite already having future All-Star Tony Parker on the roster. The underlying story of whether or not Kidd would be in a Spurs uniform the following season continued into the off-season. Kidd visited San Antonio and spoke with team officials, but ultimately re-signed with the Nets.

Perhaps the lasting memory of the series is David Robinson retiring as a champion. In the clinching game 6, Robinson had 13 points and 17 rebounds to complement Duncan on the inside. In that game, the Spurs trailed at one point 72–63 before going on a 19–0 run to put the game away and take the series. Stephen Jackson's three-pointer during the run held the lead permanently. The Spurs' win denied New Jersey from having both NBA and National Hockey League (NHL) titles in the same year as NHL's New Jersey Devils won the 2003 Stanley Cup Final.

Duncan became the eighth player in NBA history to win the Finals MVP award a second time. He joined the list of Willis Reed, Kareem Abdul-Jabbar, Magic Johnson, Larry Bird, Michael Jordan, Hakeem Olajuwon and Shaquille O'Neal. In the series-clinching game, Duncan came two blocks shy of a quadruple double in an NBA Finals game, an extremely rare feat, finishing with 21 points, 20 rebounds, 10 assists and 8 blocks. Robinson recorded the last quadruple double in NBA history with the Spurs. Duncan and Robinson grabbed 37 rebounds between them, more than the total rebounds of the entire Nets team combined (35).

Steve Kerr joined Dennis Johnson, Bill Walton, Dennis Rodman, Ron Harper and Robert Horry as the only players to win at least two championships with two franchises. Kerr won three with the Chicago Bulls (1996–1998) and another with the Spurs in 1999. Robert Horry won two with the Houston Rockets (1994, 1995) and three with the LA Lakers (2000–2002), and later went on to win two more with the Spurs in 2005 and 2007.

=== Impact of the series ===
- Despite a great performance, particularly a barrage of three-pointers in the clinching game 6 by Spurs swingman Stephen Jackson, the Spurs let Jackson leave as a free agent. Spurs veterans Steve Kerr, Danny Ferry and, most notably, David Robinson retired after the 2003 Finals.
- Duncan and Robinson were named Sportsmen of the Year by Sports Illustrated for 2003.
- This series marked the first time that two former ABA teams pitted off against each other in the NBA Finals. Four years prior, though, the Spurs made it to the NBA Finals in the shortened 1998–99 NBA season and won the championship.

== Player statistics ==
Legend
GP	Games played	GS	Games started	MPG	Minutes per game
FG%	Field-goal percentage	3P%	3-point field-goal percentage	FT%	Free-throw percentage
RPG	Rebounds per game	APG	Assists per game	SPG	Steals per game
BPG	Blocks per game	PPG	Points per game

San Antonio Spurs

San Antonio Spurs statistics
Player	GP	GS	MPG	FG%	3P%	FT%	RPG	APG	SPG	BPG	PPG
Bruce Bowen	6	6	28.5	.233	.286	1.000	3.2	0.8	0.7	0.3	3.3
Speedy Claxton	6	0	12.5	.560	.000	.750	1.0	1.5	0.7	0.7	6.2
Tim Duncan	6	6	43.8	.495	.000	.685	17.0	5.3	1.0	5.3	24.2
Danny Ferry	3	0	1.0	.000	.000	.000	0.0	0.0	0.0	0.0	0.0
Manu Ginóbili	6	0	28.7	.348	.214	.810	4.5	2.0	2.2	0.5	8.7
Stephen Jackson	6	6	35.5	.377	.357	.500	4.2	2.7	1.2	0.3	10.3
Steve Kerr	4	0	5.0	.750	1.000	.500	0.3	0.5	0.3	0.0	2.0
Tony Parker	6	6	35.3	.386	.429	.609	3.2	4.2	0.3	0.2	14.0
David Robinson	6	6	26.8	.611	.000	.700	7.3	0.7	1.2	1.8	10.8
Malik Rose	6	0	21.2	.442	.000	1.000	3.8	0.7	0.5	0.5	7.7
Steve Smith	1	0	1.0	.000	.000	.000	0.0	0.0	0.0	0.0	0.0
Kevin Willis	5	0	4.4	.333	.000	1.000	1.8	0.0	0.0	0.2	1.6

New Jersey Nets

New Jersey Nets statistics
Player	GP	GS	MPG	FG%	3P%	FT%	RPG	APG	SPG	BPG	PPG
Jason Collins	6	6	25.2	.333	.000	.800	4.7	1.0	0.7	0.5	3.7
Lucious Harris	6	0	20.8	.306	.333	.789	2.7	1.2	0.3	0.0	6.5
Richard Jefferson	6	6	38.2	.417	.000	.792	6.5	1.8	1.3	0.3	13.2
Anthony Johnson	5	0	5.6	.556	.500	.000	0.2	0.2	0.2	0.0	2.2
Jason Kidd	6	6	44.2	.364	.270	.833	6.2	7.8	1.2	0.2	19.7
Kerry Kittles	6	6	31.3	.377	.304	.800	4.2	1.3	1.8	0.5	10.8
Kenyon Martin	6	6	37.5	.343	.000	.667	10.0	2.2	1.7	2.3	14.7
Dikembe Mutombo	6	0	13.7	.500	.000	1.000	2.8	0.0	0.5	1.3	2.3
Rodney Rogers	6	0	12.3	.323	.375	.833	1.7	0.5	0.0	0.0	4.7
Brian Scalabrine	1	0	1.0	.000	.000	.000	1.0	0.0	0.0	0.0	0.0
Tamar Slay	1	0	1.0	.000	.000	.000	0.0	0.0	0.0	0.0	0.0
Aaron Williams	5	0	14.2	.423	.000	.750	4.2	0.8	0.2	1.4	5.6

== Television coverage ==
The 2003 NBA Finals was the first to be aired on ABC (including WABC-TV in the New York metropolitan area and KSAT-TV in San Antonio), taking over after a 12-year run on NBC. As part of ESPN's new media deal with the NBA, ABC's telecasts were produced by ESPN. Until 2007, it was the lowest-rated finals in NBA history.

This was also the only year to date that ABC broadcast both the NBA and the Stanley Cup finals that involved teams playing in the same arena during each series. During ABC's broadcast of game 3, Brad Nessler stated that ABC was in a unique situation getting ready for both that game and game 7 of the Stanley Cup Final between the Devils and the Mighty Ducks of Anaheim the following night. Gary Thorne, ESPN/ABC's lead NHL voice, mentioned this the following night and thanked Nessler for promoting ABC's broadcast of game 7 of the Stanley Cup Final.

This was the only NBA Finals worked by Nessler and Tolbert, while this was Walton's last Finals assignment. All three were demoted from ABC's lead role after the Finals. Though Nessler remained the lead voice for ESPN's NBA broadcasts for another season, his position at ABC was relegated to a backup role after ABC convinced Al Michaels of Monday Night Football fame to take over the lead position. Michaels was later joined by recently deposed Orlando Magic coach Doc Rivers on ABC's lead team.

== Aftermath ==
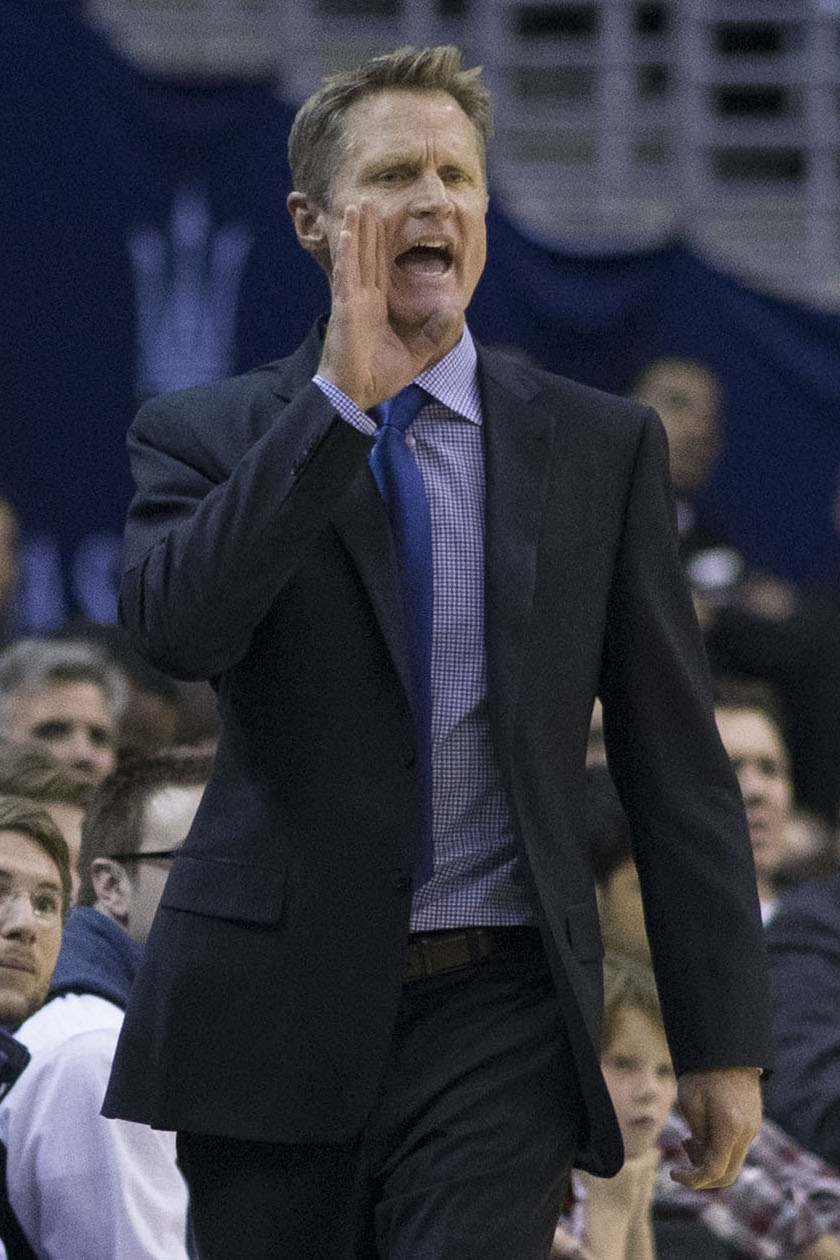
Like his mentors Gregg Popovich and Phil Jackson, Steve Kerr would go on to become one of the most successful coaches in NBA history.

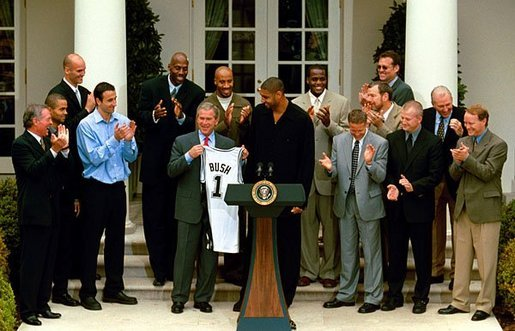
Spurs visiting President George W. Bush in October 2003.

The Nets had an inconsistent start to the 2003–04 NBA season, and with a 22–20 record early in the season they fired head coach Byron Scott. Lawrence Frank took over and led the Nets to another Atlantic Division title by winning 47 games, highlighted by a 13–0 start, the best start for a rookie head coach in sports history. Despite that, however, the Nets lost to the eventual NBA champion Detroit Pistons in seven games of the conference semifinals. As of the 2024–25 season, the 2003 Finals remain the Nets' most recent Finals appearance and is their last in New Jersey. The franchise moved to Brooklyn, New York prior to the 2012–13 season. The Nets have also not made the conference finals since 2003, having lost five times in the semifinals, with the last being in 2021.

Jason Kidd remained with the Nets until he was traded in February 2008 to the team he was originally drafted to, the Dallas Mavericks. Kidd, along with teammate Dirk Nowitzki, led the Mavericks to the NBA title in 2011. Kenyon Martin was sent to the Denver Nuggets after the 2003–04 season, while Richard Jefferson eventually joined the Spurs in the 2009–10 season, after a one-year stint with the Milwaukee Bucks. He later won a championship with the Cleveland Cavaliers in 2016.

Despite the departures of Robinson, Jackson and Kerr, the Spurs still managed to win 57 games, aided by Tim Duncan's strong play. However, they were ousted in six games by the Los Angeles Lakers, highlighted by Derek Fisher's game-winner with 0.4 seconds left in game 5 of the conference semifinals. In the years following Robinson's retirement, Duncan led the Spurs to three more NBA titles in 2005, 2007 and 2014. Steve Kerr would later lead an NBA dynasty as a head coach, winning NBA championships in 2015, 2017, 2018, and 2022 with the Golden State Warriors.
