= List of NBA on NBC broadcasters =

== Current ==
=== Play-by-play ===
- Mike Tirico: lead play-by-play (2025–present)
- Noah Eagle: play-by-play (2025–present)
- Terry Gannon: play-by-play (2025–present)
- Michael Grady: play-by-play (2025–present)
- Jason Benetti: play-by-play (2026–present)
- Mark Followill: alternate play-by-play (2025–present)
- John Fanta: alternate play-by-play and alternate sideline reporter (2026–present)

=== Color commentators ===
- Reggie Miller: co-lead color commentator (2025–present)
- Jamal Crawford: co-lead color commentator and rotating studio analyst (2025–present)
- Grant Hill: color commentator (2025–present)
- Robbie Hummel: "On the Bench" analyst/alternate color commentator (2025–present)
- Austin Rivers: "On the Bench" analyst/alternate color commentator and rotating studio analyst (2025–present)
- Derek Fisher: alternate color commentator/"On the Bench" analyst and rotating studio analyst (2025–present)
- Vince Carter: lead studio analyst and alternate color commentator (2025–present)
- Brian Scalabrine: alternate color commentator/"On the bench" analyst, and rotating studio analyst (2025–present)
- Brad Daugherty: rotating studio analyst and alternate color commentator (2025–present)
- Jordan Cornette: alternate "On the Bench" analyst, #4 sideline reporter and alternate studio host (2025–present)
- Doc Rivers: color commentator (2026–present)

=== Sideline reporters ===
- Zora Stephenson: lead sideline reporter (2025–present)
- Ashley ShahAhmadi: sideline reporter (2025–present)
- Grant Liffmann: sideline reporter and insider (2025–present)
- Jordan Cornette: sideline reporter, alternate "On the Bench" analyst and alternate studio host (2025–present)
- John Fanta: alternate sideline reporter and alternate play-by-play (2026–present)
- Chris Mannix: alternate sideline reporter and insider (2026-present)

=== Studio hosts ===
- Maria Taylor: primary studio host (2025–present)
- Ahmed Fareed: secondary studio host (2025–present)
- Jordan Cornette: sideline reporter and alternate studio host (2025–present)

=== Studio analysts ===
- Carmelo Anthony: lead studio analyst (2025–present)
- Vince Carter: lead studio analyst; alternate color commentator (2025–present)
- Tracy McGrady: lead studio analyst (2025–present)
- Jamal Crawford: co-lead color commentator and rotating studio analyst (2025–present)
- Brad Daugherty: rotating studio analyst and alternate color commentator (2025–present)
- Austin Rivers: alternate color commentator/"On the Bench" analyst and rotating studio analyst (2025–present)
- Derek Fisher: alternate color commentator/"On the Bench" analyst and rotating studio analyst (2025–present)
- Brian Scalabrine: "On the Bench" analyst and rotating studio analyst (2025–present)

=== Insiders ===
- Grant Liffmann: sideline reporter and insider (2025–present)
- Chris Mannix: alternate sideline reporter and insider (2025–present)

=== Special contributors ===
- Michael Jordan (2025–present)
- Bob Costas (2025–present)
- Caitlin Clark (February 1 and March 29, 2026)

=== Guest contributors ===
- Hannah Storm: guest studio host (2026; loaned from ESPN)
- Isiah Thomas: rotating guest studio analyst (1998–2000; 2025)
- PJ Carlesimo: guest studio analyst (2026; loaned from ESPN)
- John Michael: guest play-by-play, Magic–Cavaliers (2026)
- Kevin Ray: guest play-by-play, Hornets–Suns (2026)
- Kate Scott: guest play-by-play, Knicks–Pistons (2026)
- Doug Collins: guest color commentator (2026)
- Snoop Dogg: guest color commentator (2026–present)
- Mike Fratello: guest color commentator (2026)
- Jim Gray: guest sideline reporter (2026)
- Chris Bosh: guest studio analyst (2026)
- Kelenna Azubuike: guest studio analyst (2026)
- Evan Turner: guest studio analyst (2026)
- John Crotty: guest studio analyst (2026)
- Jalen Wilson: guest studio analyst (2026)

=== Broadcast team ===
Season	Broadcasters
2026–27	Opening Night: Terry Gannon/Robbie Hummel (Celtics)/Brian Scalabrine (Pistons); Mike Tirico/Reggie Miller/Jamal Crawford/Zora Stephenson; Noah Eagle/Grant Hill/Ashley ShahAhmadi; Rest of Season: Mike Tirico/Jamal Crawford/Jordan Cornette; Noah Eagle/Reggie Miller/Ashley ShahAhmadi, or Zora Stephenson; Terry Gannon/Jamal Crawford/Grant Liffmann, or Ashley ShahAhmadi; Michael Grady/Doc Rivers/Grant Liffmann; Jason Benetti/Reggie Miller/Ashley ShahAhmadi, or Zora Stephenson; On the Bench: Michael Grady/Robbie Hummel, or Brian Scalabrine-Austin Rivers; Jason Benetti/Robbie Hummel-Austin Rivers

== Former ==
=== 1954–1962 ===
- Jerry Doggett (1960–1961)
- Marty Glickman (1954–1961)
- Jim Gordon (1954–55)
- Curt Gowdy (1955–1960)
- Chick Hearn (1957–1958)
- Joe Lapchick (1955–56)
- Lindsey Nelson (1954–1961)
- Bill O'Donnell (1957–1960)
- Bud Palmer (1958–1962)
- Bob Wolff (1961–1962)

=== 1990–2002 ===
- Marv Albert – lead play-by-play (1990–1997, 2001–2002)
- Mike Breen – play-by-play (1997–2002)
- Quinn Buckner – studio analyst (1990–1993)
- P. J. Carlesimo – studio analyst, game analyst (2000–2002)
- Doug Collins – game analyst (1998–2001)
- Bob Costas – studio host (1990–1997), lead play-by-play (1998–2000)
- Don Criqui – play-by-play (1991–1992)
- Pat Croce – studio analyst (2001–2002)
- Chuck Daly – game analyst (1994–1997)
- Mike Dunleavy - game analyst (2002)
- Dick Enberg – play-by-play (1990–1995, 1999)
- Julius Erving – studio analyst
- Cotton Fitzsimmons – game analyst (1992–1996)
- Mike Fratello – game analyst (1990–1993), studio analyst (2001–2002)
- Jim Gray – sideline reporter (1990–2002)
- Greg Gumbel – play-by-play (1994–1998)
- Matt Guokas – game analyst (1993–2001)
- Tom Hammond – play-by-play (1990–2002)
- Kevin Harlan – play-by-play (1992–1993)
- Dan Hicks – sideline reporter (1992–1997), play-by-play (1997–2000)
- Dan Issel – game analyst (1996–1998)
- Kevin Johnson – studio analyst
- Lewis Johnson – sideline reporter
- Magic Johnson – game analyst (1991–1993)
- Steve "Snapper" Jones – game analyst (1990–2002)
- Andrea Joyce – sideline reporter (1991)
- Jim Lampley – play-by-play (1992–1993)
- Lisa Malosky – sideline reporter
- Joel Meyers – sideline reporter
- Bob Neal – play-by-play (1999)
- Ahmad Rashad – sideline reporter, studio host (1990–2002)
- Pat Riley – studio analyst, game analyst (1990–1991)
- Ron Rothstein – game analyst (1991–1992)
- John Salley – studio analyst
- Phil Simms – sideline reporter (1995–1998)
- Hannah Storm – sideline reporter (1991–1997), studio host (1997–2002)
- Paul Sunderland – play-by-play (1997–1998), sideline reporter
- Isiah Thomas – game analyst (1997–1998), studio analyst (1998–2000)
- Tom Tolbert – game analyst, studio analyst (2002)
- Peter Vecsey – studio analyst
- Bill Walton – studio analyst, game analyst (1994–2002)
- Jayson Williams – studio analyst (2001–2002)

== All-time broadcast team ==
=== Broadcaster pairings (1990–2002) ===
Season	Commentators/Reporters	References
1990–91	Marv Albert or Bob Costas/Mike Fratello or Cotton Fitzsimmons; Dick Enberg or Marv Albert/Steve Jones; Bob Costas/Pat Riley; Don Criqui or Tom Hammond/Al McGuire, Ron Rothstein or Cotton Fitzsimmons	Source:

==== 1991–92 ====
1. Marv Albert or Dick Enberg/Mike Fratello and Magic Johnson (select games)
2. Dick Enberg/Steve Jones/Magic Johnson or Cotton Fitzsimmons
3. Dick Enberg, Tom Hammond, Bob Costas, or Marv Albert/Steve Jones
4. Dick Enberg/Magic Johnson
5. Tom Hammond/Chuck Daly or Cotton Fitzsimmons

==== 1992–93 ====
1. Marv Albert or Kevin Harlan/Mike Fratello and Magic Johnson (select games)
2. Dick Enberg, Tom Hammond, or Jim Lampley/Steve Jones or Mike Fratello (All-Star Game)/Magic Johnson
3. Dick Enberg/Magic Johnson
4. Tom Hammond or Dick Enberg/Steve Jones
5. Dick Enberg/Cotton Fitzsimmons or Quinn Buckner

==== 1993–94 ====
1. Marv Albert/Matt Guokas
2. Dick Enberg or Tom Hammond/Steve Jones and Magic Johnson (All-Star Game)
3. Tom Hammond/Bill Walton

==== 1994–95 ====
1. Marv Albert/Matt Guokas/Steve Jones (All-Star Game) or Bill Walton (select games)
2. Greg Gumbel/Bill Walton/Steve Jones
3. Tom Hammond or Dick Enberg/Bill Walton
4. Greg Gumbel or Tom Hammond/Steve Jones

==== 1995–96 ====
1. Marv Albert or Greg Gumbel/Matt Guokas/Steve Jones (All-Star Game) or Bill Walton (select games)/Ahmad Rashad
2. Greg Gumbel or Tom Hammond/Bill Walton/Steve Jones/Hannah Storm
3. Tom Hammond/Steve Jones
4. Greg Gumbel/Bill Walton

==== 1996–97 ====
1. Marv Albert/Matt Guokas/Bill Walton (All-Star Game, one reg game, and NBA Finals)/Ahmad Rashad
2. Greg Gumbel/Bill Walton/Steve Jones/Jim Gray
3. Tom Hammond/Dan Issel
4. Greg Gumbel or Dick Enberg/Steve Jones
5. Don Criqui or Greg Gumbel/Bill Walton
6. Don Criqui/John Andariese
7. Dick Enberg/Ann Meyers

==== 1997–98 ====
1. Bob Costas or Dick Enberg/Doug Collins or Bill Walton (All-Star Game)/Isiah Thomas/Ahmad Rashad
2. Tom Hammond or Greg Gumbel (Gumbel left NBC after Super Bowl XXXII to return to CBS)/Bill Walton/Steve Jones/Jim Gray
3. Mike Breen or Don Criqui/Matt Guokas and Isiah Thomas (one game)
4. Dan Hicks/Dan Issel
5. Paul Sunderland or Mike Breen/Steve Jones
6. Tom Hammond/Bill Walton
- Shortly before the 1997–98 NBA season began; Marv Albert was fired following being charged with sexual assault.

==== 1998–99 ====
1. Bob Costas/Doug Collins/Ahmad Rashad
2. Tom Hammond/Bill Walton/Steve Jones/Jim Gray
3. Mike Breen/Matt Guokas
4. Dick Enberg, Bob Neal, or Mike Breen/Bill Walton
5. Tom Hammond/Steve Jones
6. Dan Hicks/Doc Rivers

==== 1999–2000 ====
1. Bob Costas or Marv Albert/Doug Collins/Ahmad Rashad
2. Tom Hammond/Bill Walton/Steve Jones/Jim Gray
3. Mike Breen or Marv Albert/Matt Guokas
4. Marv Albert or Tom Hammond/Bill Walton
5. Dan Hicks, Marv Albert or Paul Sunderland/Steve Jones
6. Paul Sunderland or Dan Hicks/Mike Fratello
- This season marked the return of Marv Albert to NBC coverage.

==== 2000–01 ====
1. Marv Albert or Mike Breen/Doug Collins/Jim Gray
2. Tom Hammond or Mike Breen/Bill Walton/Steve Jones/Lewis Johnson
3. Paul Sunderland/Matt Guokas/Andrea Joyce
4. Mike Breen, Marv Albert or Paul Sunderland/Bill Walton
5. Tom Hammond, Mike Breen, or Bob Costas/Steve Jones

==== 2001–02 ====
1. Marv Albert, Tom Hammond, or Mike Breen/Bill Walton/Steve Jones/Jim Gray
2. Mike Breen, Tom Hammond, Marv Albert, Paul Sunderland, or Bob Costas/P. J. Carlesimo/Lewis Johnson
3. Tom Hammond, Mike Breen or Bob Costas/Mike Dunleavy/Andrea Joyce
4. Mike Breen/Tom Tolbert

=== Broadcaster pairings (2025–present) ===
Season	Commentators/Reporters
2025–26	Mike Tirico/Reggie Miller/Jamal Crawford/Zora Stephenson (opening night/Mike Tirico's first broadcast return/Sunday Night Basketball); Noah Eagle/Grant Hill/Ashley ShahAhmadi (opening night/Noah Eagle's first broadcast); Noah Eagle/Austin Rivers (CLE Bench)/Robbie Hummel (DET Bench) (on the bench debut); Terry Gannon/Grant Hill/Grant Liffmann (Terry Gannon's first broadcast return); Michael Grady/Grant Hill/Ashley ShahAhmadi (Michael Grady's first broadcast); Mark Followill/Grant Hill/Ashley ShahAhmadi (Mexico City Game/Mark Followill's first broadcast); Noah Eagle/Jamal Crawford/Zora Stephenson (2025 Emirates NBA Cup: Group Play); Terry Gannon/Reggie Miller/Jordan Cornette (2025 Emirates NBA Cup: Group Play); Noah Eagle/Reggie Miller/Jamal Crawford/Zora Stephenson/Ashley ShahAhmadi (NBA All-Star Weekend)
