= NBA on television in the 2020s =

The following is a general overview of the National Basketball Association (NBA) on television in the 2020s. There have been no new national media contracts during this period. Locally three NBA teams, the Los Angeles Clippers, Utah Jazz and Phoenix Suns, moved all or some of their games from regional sports networks to over-the-air television networks.

== 2019–2020 ==
=== National ===
This was the fourth year of the current nine-year contracts with ABC, ESPN, TNT and NBA TV.

=== Local ===
Under an agreement with the U.S. Department of Justice regarding Disney's acquisition of 21st Century Fox, the Fox Sports Regional Networks were required to be sold off to third parties by June 18, 2019. Fox also invoked a clause to give Yankee Global Enterprises the rights to buy their stake back in the YES Network, which aired the local broadcasts to the NBA's Brooklyn Nets. Including YES, the Fox Sports Regional Networks held the local TV rights to a combined total of 44 NHL, NBA, and MLB teams. On March 8, YES was sold to a consortium including Yankee Global Enterprises, Amazon, and Sinclair Broadcast Group for $3.5 billion. Then on May 3, Sinclair and Entertainment Studios agreed to purchase the rest of the Fox Sports Regional Networks. The networks continued to temporarily use the Fox Sports name under a transitional license agreement while Sinclair explored re-branding options.

== 2020–2021 ==
=== National ===
This is the fifth year of the current nine-year contracts with ABC, ESPN, TNT, and NBA TV.

To reduce on-site staff, ESPN and TNT will leverage the home team's rightsholder as a host broadcaster for some of their games. They will send a neutral "world feed" and other camera feeds to the network, which will then add commentary and surrounding coverage. ESPN and TNT are also deploying additional cameras specific to their broadcasts, and ESPN may provide a supplemental on-site presence if the local broadcaster does not have enough capacity to support the host model. ESPN stated that some (roughly half) of their games, particularly marquee games exclusive to ESPN and ABC, would be produced on-site with an existing hybrid model (where some producers and graphics operators work from ESPN's studios in Bristol, Connecticut). TNT also planned to begin doing some games on-site beginning with Martin Luther King Jr. Day.

=== Local ===
On December 26, 2020, it was announced that Fox Sports Networks had acquired rights to simulcast 36 Toronto Raptors games locally in the Tampa Bay area through at least the first half of the season. All of the games will be carried via the Fox Sports Go app, with selected games to also air on television via Fox Sports Sun (15) and Fox Sports Florida (2).

On March 31, 2021, the Fox Sports Networks rebranded as Bally Sports, as part of an agreement between majority-owner Sinclair Broadcast Group and casino operator Bally's Corporation.

== 2021–2022 ==
=== National ===
This is the sixth year of a nine-year deal with ABC, ESPN, TNT, and NBA TV. Beginning with this season, TNT moved its marquee Thursday doubleheaders to Tuesday nights starting with the season opener. The network will continue to air Thursday night doubleheaders, but only during opening week and beginning in January to avoid competing with Thursday Night Football. TNT aired a doubleheader on Martin Luther King Jr. Day (January 17) and the final day of the regular season (April 10).

ABC began its NBA Saturday Primetime early with a special game airing on December 11.

On February 9, 2022, the Warriors–Jazz matchup televised on ESPN was the first in the network's history to have an all women production team. Beth Mowins was the play-by-play commentator, with Doris Burke as analyst and Lisa Salters on the sideline; in addition, 33 other women handled production roles in Salt Lake City and in the ESPN headquarters in Bristol, Connecticut.

In Game 7 of the Eastern Conference Finals, ESPN's lead play-by-play Mike Breen was out due to COVID-19 protocols, which resulted to Mark Jones replacing Breen on play-by-play. In Game 1 of the 2022 NBA Finals, analyst Jeff Van Gundy was also out for the same reason, leaving Jones, Mark Jackson, and sideline reporter Lisa Salters; they were together the first all-African-American broadcast team for an NBA Finals game. Van Gundy returned in Game 2, while Breen followed suit in Game 3.

=== Local ===
The Portland Trail Blazers signed a broadcasting deal with Root Sports Northwest, replacing NBC Sports Northwest as the team's game broadcasters.

== 2022–2023 ==
=== National ===
This was the seventh year of a nine-year deal with ABC, ESPN, TNT, and NBA TV. ESPN broadcast Wednesday and Friday night games for most of the season, and games during selected Sunday nights from February to April. ABC airs NBA Saturday Primetime during eight games selected Saturday nights between December and March, with a tripleheader on January 28, the first tripleheader on the network outside of Christmas Day along with a Saturday afternoon game on January 14. The network also broadcast NBA Sunday Showcase on three selected Sunday afternoons in February and early March. TNT aired Tuesday games all season, and Thursday games from January to April. NBA TV televised games primarily on Mondays all season, Saturday and Sunday nights for most of the season, Thursdays during the first half of the season, Fridays during the second half of the season, and any other time when neither ESPN/ABC nor TNT were airing games nationally.

Five Christmas Day games were scheduled for this season. ABC was originally scheduled to air just a tripleheader, but it was later decided that all five Christmas games would be simulcast across both ABC and ESPN for the first time, likely in an attempt to counterprogram the NFL's scheduling of a Christmas Day tripleheader for the first time. Previously, the most Christmas games that either network had ever aired in any given season was three.

Four games were held on Martin Luther King Jr. Day, with TNT and NBA TV each airing two of them.

The NBA designed January 24–28 as "NBA Rivals Week", with every nationally televised game featuring "classic and budding rivalries between teams and players".

On March 8, ESPN had another all-female crew for an NBA game for the second straight year. The 7:30pm (ET) telecast between the Dallas Mavericks and the New Orleans Pelicans had Beth Mowins and Doris Burke as commentators, with Cassidy Hubbarth on the sideline, while the 10:00pm (ET) telecast between the Toronto Raptors and the Los Angeles Clippers had Mike Breen and Mark Jackson as commentators, with reporter Ros Gold-Onwude joining the broadcast team as an analyst/color commentator.

On the final day of the regular season, April 9, two games with playoff implications were flexed into ESPN's afternoon doubleheader.

=== Local ===
In September 2022, Monumental Sports & Entertainment bought out NBCUniversal's ownership stake in NBC Sports Washington, which carries broadcasts of the Washington Wizards and the NHL's Washington Capitals, both Monumental-owned teams. Monumental initially took minority ownership of the network in 2016. NBC will provide transitional corporate, technical, and distribution support up to 18 months after the sale, and Monumental plans to rebrand the network after the 2022–23 season.

In October 2022, the Clippers announced an agreement with KTLA to air 15 games. The remaining games will continue to air on Bally Sports West. The Clippers also launched a direct-to-consumer streaming service called ClipperVision. The service includes all non-national games.

On February 24, 2023, the AT&T SportsNet regional sports networks sent letters to the Houston Rockets and the Utah Jazz saying they had until March 31, 2023, to reach an agreement to take their local television rights back. Warner Bros. Discovery, the owners of the networks, intends to leave the regional sports networks business. If a deal is not reached the networks would file for Chapter 7 bankruptcy. The Portland Trail Blazers's deal with Root Sports Northwest is not affected because Warner Bros. Discovery only has minority control of that network.

On March 14, Diamond Sports Group, the operator of the Bally Sports regional sports networks, filed for Chapter 11 bankruptcy. Diamond plans to continue to broadcast games for the 16 NBA teams it has regional rights to while it plans to separate from majority parent Sinclair Broadcast Group as part of the reorganization.

== 2023–2024 ==
=== National ===
This was the eighth year of a nine-year deal with ABC, ESPN, TNT, and NBA TV. ESPN broadcast Wednesday and Friday night games for most of the season, and games during selected Sunday nights from February to April. ABC was scheduled to air nine NBA Saturday Primetime games, including a tripleheader on January 27, over seven selected Saturdays between that January date and March. ABC also broadcast NBA Sunday Showcase on four selected Sunday afternoons in February and March, with three of them as doubleheaders. TNT aired Tuesday games all season, and Thursday games from January to April. NBA TV televised games primarily on Mondays all season, Saturday and Sunday nights for most of the season, Thursdays during the first half of the season, Fridays during the second half of the season, and any other time when neither ESPN/ABC nor TNT were airing games nationally.

Five Christmas Day games were scheduled for this season. With Christmas Day falling on a Monday in 2023, the NFL also scheduled a Monday Night Football on that day. Because ABC/ESPN holds the broadcast rights to both NBA Christmas games and Monday Night Football, it was decided that ESPN would again air all five NBA games, but ABC would only simulcast two of them in favor of exclusively airing the Monday Night Football game. This would mark the first time since 2016 that ABC televised fewer than three NBA Christmas games.

Four Martin Luther King Jr. Day games were televised nationally, with TNT and NBA TV airing two apiece.

On January 23–27, the league held "NBA Rivals Week" for the second consecutive season, with every nationally televised game featuring "classic and budding rivalries between teams and players".

On the final day of the regular season, April 14, two games with playoff implications were flexed into ESPN's afternoon doubleheader.

=== Local ===
The 16 NBA teams who had deals with the Bally Sports regional sports networks may be affected by its operator Diamond Sports Group's March 14, 2023, decision to file for Chapter 11 bankruptcy. Diamond had initially sought to continue broadcasting regional games while it plans to separate from majority parent Sinclair Broadcast Group as part of the reorganization.

On April 20, 2023, the Phoenix Suns signed a five-year agreement with Gray Television to replace Bally Sports Arizona as their broadcaster. Most Suns games were then carried on broadcast television by Gray's KTVK, KPHO-TV, or KPHE-LD in Phoenix (as well as a Gray station in Tucson, and a new Gray station in Yuma that launched before the start of the season). The Suns will also operate an over-the-top subscription service. After the announcement, Diamond accused the team of breaching its contract and bankruptcy law, stating that the team was making an "improper effort" to "change their broadcasting partner without permitting Diamond to exercise our contractual rights." In response, Phoenix Suns CEO Josh Bartelstein stated that "Diamond's position is totally inaccurate. We are moving forward with this deal and could not be more excited about what it means for our fans and our future." On May 10, 2023, the bankruptcy judge voided the Suns contract with Gray, ruling that the Suns violated Bally Sports Arizona's contractual right of first refusal. He ordered the parties into arbitration. On July 14, 2023, the deal became official when Diamond declined to match Gray's contract offer.

In February 2023, Warner Bros. Discovery announced it was winding down its AT&T SportsNet regional sports network business, affecting the Houston Rockets and the Utah Jazz's broadcasters, AT&T SportsNet Southwest and AT&T SportsNet Rocky Mountain, respectively. The Portland Trail Blazers' deal with Root Sports Northwest is not affected because Warner Bros. Discovery only has minority control of that network. On June 20, 2023, the Jazz reached an agreement with Sinclair Broadcast Group owned stations KJZZ-TV and KUTV to become its new television home. Jazz owner Ryan Smith started a new in-house production division, SEG Media, to produce the telecasts. While all games will air on KJZZ, Sinclair retains the right to carry select telecasts on KUTV. KUTV will maintain an "official station" relationship with the team, allowing more coverage of the Jazz and its players. The deal will also include a streaming service, which will not involve KJZZ-TV. The Houston Rockets and the MLB's Houston Astros have continued to negotiate to take over AT&T SportsNet Southwest.

== 2024–2025 ==
=== National ===
This will be the ninth and final season of a nine-year deal with ABC, ESPN, TNT, and NBA TV.

=== Local ===
On June 3, 2024, the Chicago Bulls announced the Chicago Sports Network as its new broadcasting partner beginning in the 2024–25 season replacing NBC Sports Chicago.

== 2025–2026 ==
=== National ===
Upon the expiration of TNT Sports' contract with the NBA in 2025, the league signed a broadcast television rights agreement with NBC Sports and Prime Video, which is set to begin airing games in the 2025–26 season. On July 26, TNT filed its lawsuit against the league in New York state court, seeking to delay the NBA's new 2025 media deals from taking effect and to rule that TNT's offer matched Amazon's contract. On August 23, the NBA filed a motion to dismiss the lawsuit, on account of Warner Bros. Discovery (WBD) attempting to "save billions of dollars by combining Amazon's lower price with the linear television rights granted to NBC. On November 16, 2024, ESPN agreed to pick up Inside the NBA to air in conjunction with its own NBA coverage (with TNT continuing to produce the program with its existing personalities).

After obtaining the NBA broadcast rights, NBC and Prime Video courted previous announcers from the NBA on TNT. Before NBA returns to NBC, both college basketball commentators Noah Eagle and Terry Gannon has joined the coverage for NBA, then it went with veteran broadcaster Mike Tirico to be the lead play-by-play announcer for its NBA broadcasts, making his return to NBA after 9-years. ESPN's Michael Grady will join both ways that includes Amazon Prime Video for NBA coverage. Tirico called his first NBA game on a regular basis since the 2015–16 season, as well as Gannon called for his first NBA game on a regular basis since the 2012–13 season with ESPN.

Tirico was initially joined on the broadcasts by color commentators Reggie Miller and Jamal Crawford and lead sideline reporter Zora Stepheson. With the addition of Mark Followill and Michael Grady as play-by-play announcer to the NBA on NBC line-up. During the summer they added game analyst Grant Hill, Robbie Hummel, Austin Rivers, Brian Scalabrine, Derek Fisher and Brad Daugherty. Aside from Stepheson, Grant Liffmann, Ashley ShahAhmadi, Jordan Cornette and John Fanta also handled sideline reporting duties. Maria Taylor and Ahmed Fareed presided as host of the network's pre-game show, NBA Showtime. On May 10, 2025, NBC Sports announced that Carmelo Anthony and Vince Carter would be a studio analyst, then two-months later Tracy McGrady also joined as well. On April 15, 2026, Jason Benetti announced for alternate play-by-play for NBA on NBC, during the 2026 playoffs.

Amazon Prime Video formally confirmed its commentator teams on July 10, 2025. Longtime NBA on TNT play-by-play man Ian Eagle would be the network's lead play-by-play announcer; also Kevin Harlan is reuniting Eagle and newcomer Eric Collins were officially named as play-by-play commentators. In mid-2025, former TNT personality Stan Van Gundy, Candace Parker, and Steve Nash joined the NBA on Prime Video team for their NBA coverage as well as newcomer Dwyane Wade, Brent Barry, Jim Jackson and Dell Curry. Former ESPN's Cassidy Hubbarth has joined NBA on Prime Video along with newcomer Allie Clifton, Kristina Pink and JayDee Dyer are named as sideline reporters.

== See also ==
- List of NBA Finals broadcasters § 2020s
- List of NBA All-Star Game broadcasters § 2020s
- List of NBA on ABC commentators
- List of NBA on ESPN broadcasters
- List of NBA on TNT commentators
- NBA on television in the 1950s
- NBA on television in the 1960s
- NBA on television in the 1970s
- NBA on television in the 1990s
- NBA on television in the 2000s
- NBA on television in the 2010s
