= List of current NBA broadcasters =

The following is a list of current National Basketball Association (NBA) broadcasters for each individual team entering the 2026–27 NBA season.

== Regional broadcasters ==
- Note: All teams carried by the NBC Sports Regional Networks also stream restricted to their market areas through Peacock and the NBC Sports app with provider authentication. All teams air their radio broadcasts through the NBA app and SiriusXM on satellite and streaming.

=== Eastern Conference ===
==== Atlantic Division ====
===== Television =====
Team	Play-by-play	Color commentator(s)	Sideline reporter(s)	Flagship station(s)	Over-the-air affiliates	Direct-to-consumer streaming
Boston	Drew Carter	Brian Scalabrine (primary); Eddie House (select games)	Abby Chin	NBC Sports Boston	None	NBC Sports App; Peacock via add-on
Brooklyn	Ian Eagle (primary); Ryan Ruocco (select games during Eagle's CBS Sports/Amazon commitments); Noah Eagle (select games when Eagle and Ruocco are on assignment); Ed Cohen (select games when Eagle and Ruocco are on assignment); Emmanuel Berbari (select games when Eagle and Ruocco are on assignment); Chris Carrino (select games when Eagle and Ruocco are on assignment)	Sarah Kustok (primary); Richard Jefferson (select games); Tim Capstraw (select games)	Meghan Triplett; Justin Shackil (select games)	YES Network	WLNY-TV (During April conflicts with the Yankees)	DAZN
New York	Mike Breen (primary); Kenny Albert (select games during Breen's ESPN & ABC assignments); Tyler Murray (select games when Breen and Albert are on assignment)	Walt Frazier; Wally Szczerbiak; Steve Novak; Monica McNutt	Alan Hahn; Bill Pidto (select games)	MSG Network	None	DAZN
Philadelphia	Kate Scott; Pat McCarthy (select games when Scott is on assignment for NBC or USA)	Alaa Abdelnaby	Tom Haberstroh; Amy Fadool (select games)	NBC Sports Philadelphia	None	NBC Sports App; Peacock via add-on
Toronto	Matt Devlin	Jack Armstrong (Games on TSN); Alvin Williams (Games on Sportsnet)	Raegan Subban (Games on TSN); Danielle Michaud (Games on Sportsnet)	TSN (41 games); Sportsnet/Sportsnet One (41 games)	None	TSN; Sportsnet+

===== Radio =====
Team	Play-by-play	Color commentator(s)	Flagship Station
Boston	Sean Grande (primary); Jon Wallach (select games)	Cedric Maxwell (primary); Brian Robb (select games)	WBZ-FM; WROR-FM (will carry games that are in conflict with Boston Bruins hockey games or New England Patriots football games; WBZ-FM also being the Bruins' flagship)
Brooklyn	Chris Carrino (primary); Bob Heussler (when Chris Carrino is on YES Network)	Tim Capstraw	WFAN AM/FM
New York	Tyler Murray (primary); Kenny Albert (select games during Murray's absences); Pat O'Keefe (select games during both Murray's and Albert's absences)	Monica McNutt (primary); Alan Hahn (select games); Wally Szczerbiak (select games)	WHSQ
Philadelphia	Tom McGinnis (primary); Matt Murphy (select games)		WPEN; WMGK (selected games)
Toronto	Eric Smith	Paul Jones	CJCL/CHUM

===== Spanish =====
Team	Play-by-play	Color commentator(s)	Flagship Station
Boston	Jesús Quiñones	Giddel Padilla	NBC Sports Boston SAP; Telemundo Station Group (Note: Affiliates Include: WNEU (Merrimack–Manchester, NH/Boston); WRDM-CD/WDMR-LD (Springfield/Hartford–New Haven, CT); WRIW-CD/WYCN-LD (Providence, RI))
Brooklyn	Max Pérez-Jiménez	Ino Gómez	WADO; YES Network SAP
New York	Clemson Smith-Muñiz	Ramón Rivas	WADO; MSG Deportes

===== French =====
Team	Play-by-play	Color commentator(s)	Flagship Station
Toronto	Alexandre Tourigny; Mathieu Jolivet	Peter Yannopoulos; Will Archambault	RDS; RDS2

==== Central Division ====
===== Television =====
Team	Play-by-play	Color commentator(s)	Sideline reporter	Flagship station(s)	Over-the-air affiliates	Direct-to-consumer streaming
Chicago	Adam Amin (primary); Mark Schanowski (select games when Amin is on assignment for Fox); Wayne Randazzo (select games when Amin is on assignment for Fox); Connor Onion (select games when Amin is on assignment for Fox)	Kendall Gill; Robbie Hummel; Will Perdue; Bill Wennington; Scott Williams	K. C. Johnson; Ruthie Polinsky (select games)	Chicago Sports Network	(Note: Affiliates include: KDMI-DT3 (Des Moines/Ames); KMEG-DT5 (Sioux City); KWKB-DT5 (Cedar Rapids/Waterloo/Iowa City/Dubuque); WMMT-DT4 (Grand Rapids/Kalamazoo/Battle Creek)) (All games)	Chicago Sports Network
Cleveland	John Michael	Brad Daugherty; Austin Carr	Serena Winters	None	(Note: Affiliates Include: Rock Entertainment Sports Network (select games); WOHZ-CD (Canton); WUAB-TV/WOIO/WTCL-LD (Cleveland); W28FG-D (Akron); WZCD-LD (Dayton); WXIX-DT3 (Cincinnati)) (15 games)	DAZN
Detroit	George Blaha (primary); Johnny Kane (fill-in)	Greg Kelser	Johnny Kane; Natalie Kerwin	Scripps Sports/WMYD/WXYZ-TV	(Note: Affiliates Include: WXMI-DT2 (Grand Rapids); WSYM-DT2 (Lansing); WNEM-DT2 (Flint/Saginaw/Bay City); WWTV-DT3 (Traverse City/Cadillac); WBKB-DT4 (Alpena); WJMN-DT3 (Marquette)) (All games)	DAZN
Indiana	Chris Denari	Quinn Buckner; Eddie Gill (home games)	Jeremiah Johnson	None	(Note: Affiliates Include: WTTV/WXIN (Indianapolis); WTVW (Evansville); WCIX (Champaign)) (15 games)	DAZN
Milwaukee	Lisa Byington (primary); Dave Koehn (select games when Byington is on assignment)	Marques Johnson (primary); Wesley Matthews (select games)	Melanie Ricks (Primary); Stephen Watson	WVTV/WVTV-DT2	(Note: Affiliates Include: WBAY-DT3 (Green Bay); WISC-DT2 (Madison); WKBT-DT2 (La Crosse-Eau Claire); WJFW-DT2 (Wausau)) (All games)	Bucks+

===== Radio =====
Team	Play-by-play	Color commentator(s)	Sideline reporter	Flagship Station
Chicago	Chuck Swirsky	Bill Wennington		WSCR
Cleveland	Tim Alcorn			WTAM/WMMS
Detroit	Mark Champion (primary); George Blaha (select games)	Rick Mahorn		WXYT; WWJ; WDZH (both conflict with the Detroit Red Wings)
Indiana	Mark Boyle	Eddie Gill	Pat Boylan	WIBC-HD2/W228CX/W298BB
Milwaukee	Dave Koehn (primary); Josh Mauer (select games when Koehn is on TV)	Ben Brust (home games); Justin Garcia (select games)		WTMJ/W277CV

===== Spanish =====
Team	Play-by-play	Color commentator(s)	Flagship Station
Chicago	Miguel Esparza	Elio Benitez	WRTO
Cleveland	Rafael Hernández Brito		WLFM-LP

==== Southeast Division ====
===== Television =====
Team	Play-by-play	Color Commentator(s)	Sideline Reporter	Flagship station(s)	Over-the-air affiliates	Direct-to-consumer streaming
Atlanta	Bob Rathbun	Dominique Wilkins; Brian Oliver (select games)	Madison Hock (primary); Baillie Burmaster	WANF/Peachtree Sports Network	(Note: Affiliates include: WANF/WPCH-TV (Atlanta); WALB-DT4 (Albany); WAGT-CD2 (Augusta/Aiken); WVTM-DT3 (Columbus); WPGA-LD (Macon); WTOC-DT7 (Savannah); WTVY-DT5 (Dothan); WAAY-DT6 (Huntsville/Decatur/Florence); WBRC-DT2 (Birmingham/Anniston/Tuscaloosa); WCOV-DT2 (Montgomery/Selma); WSMV-DT2 (Nashville); WVLT-DT2 (Knoxville)) (All games)	Prime Video
Charlotte	Eric Collins (primary); Sam Farber (select games when Collins is on assignment for Amazon Prime or Fox)	Dell Curry (primary); Terrence Oglesby (select games when Curry is on assignment for Amazon Prime)	Shannon Spake	WAXN-TV/WSOC-TV	(Note: Affiliates include: Palmetto Sports & Entertainment Network; WIS-DT4 (Columbia); WMYV (Greensboro/High Point/Winston-Salem); WMBF-DT3 (Myrtle Beach/Florence); WHNS-DT2 (Greenville/Spartanburg/Asheville/Anderson); WECT-DT3/WSFX-TV (Wilmington); WRDC (Raleigh/Durham/Fayetteville); WCSC-DT3 (Charleston); WITN-DT2 (Greenville/New Bern/Washington); WZBJ/WDBJ-TV (Roanoke)) (All games)	DAZN
Miami	Eric Reid	John Crotty	Kristen Hewitt; Will Manso	WPLG	(Note: Affiliates include: WTCN-CD (West Palm Beach/Fort Pierce); WINK-DT3 (Fort Myers/Naples)) (All games)	Local 10+ Platinum
Orlando	Dante Marchitelli	Jeff Turner	Kendra Douglas	WRDQ/WFTV	(Note: Affiliates include: WJAX-DT2/WFOX-TV (Jacksonville); WMOR-TV (Tampa); WTGB-DT3 (Gainesville); WCTV-DT3 (Tallahassee); WJHG-DT6 (Panama City)) (All games)	DAZN
Washington	Chris Miller	Drew Gooden (primary); Brendan Haywood (select games)	Chase Hughes	Monumental Sports Network	None	Monumental Sports Network+

===== Radio =====
Team	Play-by-play	Color commentator(s)	Flagship Station
Atlanta	Steve Holman	Mike Conti	WZGC; WVEE
Charlotte	Sam Farber (primary); Rob Longo (select games when Farber is on TV)	Matt Carroll	WPZS
Miami	Jason Jackson	Amy Audibert	WQAM
Orlando	Jake Chapman	Terrence Ross; Michael Carter-Williams	WYGM; WTKS-HD2
Washington	Dave Johnson	Glenn Consor	WTEM; WDCH-FM (select games); WFED (select games)

===== Spanish =====
Team	Play-by-play	Analyst(s)	Flagship Station
Miami	José Pañeda	Joe Pujala	WQBA

=== Western Conference ===
==== Northwest Division ====
===== Television =====
Team	Play-by-play	Color commentator(s)	Sideline reporter	Flagship station(s)	Over-the-air affiliates	Direct-to-consumer streaming
Denver	Noah Reed	Katy Winge; Jason Richardson (select games)	Lauren Gardner; Vic Lombardi	Altitude Sports	KTVD/KUSA (20 games)	Altitude+
Minnesota	Michael Grady (primary); Jon Sciambi (select games when Grady is on assignment for NBC or Amazon Prime); Kevin Calabro (select games when Grady or Sciambi is on assignment); Alan Horton (select games when Grady or Sciambi is on assignment)	Jim Petersen	Meghan McPeak	None	(Note: Affiliates Include: North Star Sports & Entertainment Network (select games); KARE (Minneapolis - St. Paul); KEYC-DT3 (Mankato); KBJR-DT3 (Duluth); KXLT-DT2 (Rochester); WECX-LD (La Crosse - Eau Claire)) (15 games)	DAZN
Oklahoma City	Chris Fisher	Michael Cage	Nick Gallo; Paris Lawson	Thunder Gameday Network/KSBI-TV/KOTV-DT (cable exclusive feeds)	(Note: Affiliates include: KSBI-TV/KWTV-DT (Oklahoma City); KQCW/KOTV-DT (Tulsa); KSWO-DT3 (Wichita Falls/Lawton); KSCW-DT/KWCH-DT (Wichita); KFJX (Joplin)) (10 games)	Thunder+
Portland	Travis Demers	Lamar Hurd; Evan Turner (select games); Steve Smith (select games); Michael Holton (road games); Devon Pouncey (road games)	Brooke Olzendam	Rip City TV Network/KUNP/KATU-DT2/KATU	(Note: Affiliates include: KVAL-DT2 (Eugene); KCBY-DT2 (Coos Bay); KPIC-DT2 (Roseburg); KTVL-DT3 (Medford); KUNS-TV/KSTW (Seattle); KFFX (Yakima); KCYU-LD (Pasco); KXLY-DT2/KXLY-DT3 (Spokane); KOHD-DT2 (Bend)) (All games)	BlazerVision
Utah	Craig Bolerjack	Thurl Bailey	Lauren Green; Holly Rowe (select games)	SEG Media/KJZZ		Jazz+

===== Radio =====
Team	Play-by-play	Color commentator(s)	Sideline Reporter	Flagship Station
Denver	Jason Kosmicki	Scott Hastings (national/non-televised games)	Katy Winge (national/non-televised games)	Altitude Sports 92.5 FM; Altitude Sports AM 950
Minnesota	Alan Horton			KFXN (selected games)
Oklahoma City	Matt Pinto			WWLS
Portland	Travis Demers (primary); Rich Burk (fill-in)	Antonio Harvey (primary); Chad Doeing (fill-in for select home games)		KPOJ
Utah	David Locke	Ron Boone		KSL

===== Spanish =====
Team	Play-by-play	Color commentator(s)	Flagship Station
Oklahoma City	Eleno Ornelas		WKY
Utah	Nelson Moran	Isidro Lopez and Francisco Vazquez	KTUB

==== Pacific Division ====
===== Television =====
Team	Play-by-play	Color commentator(s)	Sideline Reporter	Flagship station(s)	Over-the-air affiliates	Direct-to-consumer streaming
Golden State	Bob Fitzgerald	Kelenna Azubuike	Kerith Burke	NBC Sports Bay Area	None	NBC Sports App; Peacock via add-on
LA Clippers	Brian Sieman; Carlo Jiménez (Select TV/Radio Simulcast Games)	Jim Jackson (primary); Mike Fratello (select games); Brent Barry (select games)	Ohm Youngmisuk	ClipperVision	(Note: Affiliates include: KTLA (Los Angeles); KSWB-TV (San Diego); KGET-TV (Bakersfield); KSEE-TV/KGPE-TV (Fresno)) (10 games)	ClipperVision
LA Lakers	Bill Macdonald	Stu Lantz	Mike Trudell	Spectrum SportsNet	None	Spectrum SportsNet+
Phoenix	Kevin Ray; Tom Leander (Select Games)	Eddie Johnson; Ann Meyers Drysdale	Amanda Pflugrad	Arizona's Family Sports/KTVK	(Note: Affiliates include: KAZF (Flagstaff); KOLD-DT3 (Tucson/Sierra Vista); KAZS (Yuma/El Centro)) (all games)	Suns Live
Sacramento	Mark Jones	Kayte Christensen		NBC Sports California	None	NBC Sports App; Peacock via add-on

===== Radio =====
Team	Play-by-play	Color commentator(s)	Flagship Station
Golden State	Tim Roye	Tom Tolbert (home games); Jim Barnett (road games)	KGMZ
LA Clippers	Carlo Jiménez	Adam Ausland; Mike Fratello (select games)	KLAC; KEIB (if conflict with Los Angeles Dodgers)
LA Lakers	John Ireland	Mychal Thompson	KSPN; KLAA (select games); KABC (select games)
Phoenix	Jon Bloom	Tim Kempton	KTAR; KMVP
Sacramento	Gary Gerould		KHTK

===== Spanish =====
Team	Play-by-play	Color commentator(s)	Flagship Station
LA Clippers	Armando Garcia		KWKW
LA Lakers	Fernando González	Jose Mantilla and Francisco Pinto	KWKW
Phoenix	Arturo Ochoa	Samuel Sandoval	KSUN
Sacramento	Armando Botello		KRCX

==== Southwest Division ====
===== Television =====
Team	Play-by-play	Color commentator(s)	Sideline reporter(s)	Flagship station(s)	Over-the-air affiliates	Direct-to-consumer streaming
Dallas	Mark Followill (primary); Ted Emrich (select games when Followill is on BTN or NBC assignment)	Derek Harper; Devin Harris; Jeff Wade	Jeff Wade; Lesley McCaslin	MavsTV/KFAA-TV/WFAA (select simulcasts)	(Note: Affiliates include: KWKT-DT2 (Waco/Temple); KYLE-TV (Bryan); KYTX-DT3 (Tyler/Longview/Lufkin/Nacogdoches); KWWT (Odessa/Midland); KXVA-DT2 (Abilene/Sweetwater); KIDY-DT2 (San Angelo); KFDA-DT2 (Amarillo); KTSM-DT2 (El Paso/Las Cruces); KGBT-DT2 (Harlingen/Weslaco/Brownsville/McAllen); KMYL-LD (Lubbock); KXII-DT2 (Sherman); KSHV-TV (Texarkana/Shreveport); KJBO-DT2 (Wichita Falls/Lawton)) (All games)	MavsTV (streaming service)
Houston	Craig Ackerman	Ryan Hollins	Ashley Stroehlein	Space City Home Network	None	SCHN+
Memphis	Pete Pranica	Brevin Knight	Rob Fischer	None	(Note: Affiliates Include: WATN-TV (Memphis); WUXP-TV (Nashville); WBIR-DT2 (Knoxville)) (15 games)	DAZN
New Orleans	Joel Meyers	Antonio Daniels	Andrew Lopez	Gulf Coast Sports & Entertainment Network/WVUE-DT3	(Note: Affiliates include: KALB-DT4/KLGC-LD2 (Alexandria); WAFB-DT3 (Baton Rouge); WLOX-DT6/WTBL-DT3 (Biloxi/Gulfport); WBRC-DT3 (Birmingham/Anniston/Tuscaloosa); WDAM-DT5/WLHA-LD2 (Hattiesburg/Laurel); WLBT-DT3 (Jackson); KATC-DT2/KNGC-LD (Lafayette); KGCH-LD (Lake Charles); WTOK-DT5/WOOK-LD5 (Meridian); WALA-DT5 (Mobile/Pensacola); KNOE-DT3/KCWL-LD (Monroe/El Dorado); WSFA-DT3 (Montgomery/Selma); KSLA-DT2 (Shreveport)) (All games)	Pelicans+
San Antonio	Jacob Tobey	Sean Elliott; Matt Bonner; Fabricio Oberto (select games)	Nate Ryan	None	(Note: Affiliates include: WOAI-DT2 (San Antonio); KBVO-TV (Austin); KSCC-DT3 (Corpus Christi)) (22 games)	DAZN

===== Radio =====
Team	Play-by-play	Color commentator(s)	Flagship Station
Dallas	Chuck Cooperstein	Brian Dameris	KRLD-FM
Houston	Matt Thomas	Adam Clanton; Adam Wexler	KBME (primary); KTRH (if conflict with Houston Astros)
Memphis	Eric Hasseltine	Elliot Perry; Michael Wallace	WMFS-FM
New Orleans	Todd Graffagnini	John DeShazier	WWL-AM & WWL-FM
San Antonio	Dan Weiss		WOAI

===== Spanish =====
Team	Play-by-play	Flagship Station
Dallas	Victor Villalba	KFLC
Houston	Adrian Chavarria	KHPT
San Antonio	Paul Castro	KXTN
New Orleans	Emilio Peralta	WODT

== National broadcasters ==
=== English announcers ===
National television rights in English language in the United States are held by ESPN/ABC, NBC Sports and Prime Video, with ESPN Deportes and Telemundo broadcasting games in the Spanish language. During the regular season, ESPN and NBC airs most nationally televised games, with additional games streamed online exclusively on ESPN DTC, Peacock and Prime Video. ABC will also air a select number of games nationally.

Game	Play-by-play	Color analyst(s)	Sideline reporter(s)	Rules analyst(s)	Network
NBA on ESPN/ABC	Mike Breen (lead); Ryan Ruocco (secondary); Dave Pasch (secondary); Mike Monaco (secondary); Drew Carter (secondary)	Richard Jefferson (co-lead); Tim Legler (co-lead); Doris Burke (secondary); Jason Kidd (secondary); Jeremy Lin (secondary); P. J. Carlesimo (select games)	Lisa Salters (lead); Malika Andrews (secondary); Katie George (secondary); Jorge Sedano (secondary); Angel Gray (secondary); Alyssa Lang (secondary); Vanessa Richardson (secondary); Taylor McGregor (secondary)	Steve Javie	ESPN; ESPN2; ESPN+ ABC; ESPN DTC; Disney+
NBA on NBC	Mike Tirico (co-lead); Noah Eagle (co-lead); Terry Gannon (secondary); Michael Grady (secondary); Mark Followill (secondary); Jason Benetti (secondary)	Reggie Miller (co-lead); Jamal Crawford (co-lead); Grant Hill (select games); Robbie Hummel (secondary); Austin Rivers (secondary); Doc Rivers (secondary); Vince Carter (secondary); Brad Daugherty (secondary); Derek Fisher (secondary Mike Fratello (secondary); Brian Scalabrine (secondary)	Zora Stephenson (lead); Ashley ShahAhmadi (secondary); Grant Liffmann (secondary); Jordan Cornette (secondary); John Fanta (secondary); Chris Mannix (secondary)	—N/a	NBC; NBCSN; Peacock; NBC Sports App
NBA on Prime	Ian Eagle (co-lead); Kevin Harlan (co-lead); Michael Grady (secondary); Eric Collins (secondary)	Stan Van Gundy (lead); Dwyane Wade (select games); Candace Parker (select games); Brent Barry (select games); Jim Jackson (secondary); Steve Nash (secondary); Dell Curry (secondary); John Wall (secondary)	Cassidy Hubbarth (lead); Allie Clifton (secondary); Kristina Pink (secondary); Chris Haynes (secondary); JayDee Dyer (secondary)	—N/a	Amazon Prime Video
NBA on ESPN Radio	Marc Kestecher; Sean Kelley; Mike Couzens; Ed Cohen	P. J. Carlesimo; Kelenna Azubuike; Cory Alexander; Sarah Kustok	Jorge Sedano (select games); Vanessa Richardson (select games)	—N/a	ESPN Radio

=== Spanish announcers ===
Play-by-play	Color analyst(s)	Sideline reporter(s)	Network
Ernesto Jerez; Leonardo Montero; Alejandro Pérez; Fernando Tirado; Julia Headley	Andrés Nocioni; Fabricio Oberto; Julio Lamas; Miguel Angel Briseno; Toño Rodriguez	Katia Castorena (playoffs); Sebastian Martínez Christensen (playoffs)	ESPN Deportes; ABC (on SAP)
Álvaro Martín; Alfre Alvarez; José Francisco Rivera; Edgar Lopez	Greivis Vásquez; Diego Balado; Vero Rodríguez	Diego Arrioja (Sunday Night Basketball)	Telemundo; Peacock; NBC (on SAP)
Álvaro Martín; Enrique Garay; Alex Blanco; Charlie Cancino; Carlos Altamirano; Fernanda Aguilera	Omar Quintero; Carlos Morales; Germán Beder; Jorge Mota; Mary Carmen Lara; Paulina García Robles	—N/a	Prime Video (on SAP)

== International broadcasters ==
=== Americas ===
==== Central America and Mexico ====
- Costa Rica, El Salvador, Guatemala, Honduras, Nicaragua and Panama: ESPN, Prime Video, HBO Max
- Mexico: ESPN/Disney+, Prime Video and NBA TV International

==== South America ====
- Argentina: ESPN, Prime Video, TNT Sports/HBO Max
- Bolivia: ESPN, Prime Video, TNT/HBO Max
- Brazil: ESPN/Disney+ and Prime Video
- Chile: ESPN, Prime Video, TNT Sports/HBO Max
- Colombia: ESPN, Prime Video, TNT/HBO Max
- Ecuador: ESPN, Prime Video, TNT/HBO Max
- Paraguay: ESPN, Prime Video, TNT/HBO Max
- Peru: ESPN, Prime Video, TNT/HBO Max
- Suriname: ESPN, SCCN TV, Prime Video
- Uruguay: ESPN, Prime Video, TNT/HBO Max
- Venezuela: ESPN, Prime Video, TNT/HBO Max

==== North America and Caribbean ====
- Canada: TSN/RDS, Sportsnet, Prime Video and NBA TV
- (Caribbean Community) Caribbean: ESPN, Rush Sports, Prime Video and NBA TV International
- Dominican Republic: ESPN, Prime Video and NBA TV International
- Puerto Rico: ABC/ESPN, WAPA 2 Deportes, NBC/Peacock, Prime Video, NBA TV

=== Europe ===
- Albania: Tring Sport and Prime Video
- Andorra: DAZN and Prime Video
- Armenia: Fast Sports and Prime Video
- Austria: Sky Sport and Prime Video
- Azerbaijan: Setanta Sports and Prime Video
- Bosnia and Herzegovina: Disney+, Arena Sport and Prime Video
- Belgium: DAZN and Prime Video
- Bulgaria: Diema Sport and Prime Video
- Croatia: Disney+, Sport Klub and Prime Video
- Cyprus: CYTA
- Czech Republic: Nova Sport, Disney+ and Prime Video
- Denmark: 6'eren/HBO Max
- Estonia: Disney+, Go3 Sport and Prime Video
- Finland: TV5/HBO Max
- France: beIN Sports and Prime Video
- (Georgia (country)) Georgia: Setanta Sports and Silknet
- Germany: Sky Sport and Prime Video.
- Greece: Disney+, Cosmote Sport and Prime Video
- Hungary: Disney+, Sport1 and Prime Video
- Iceland: Stöð 2 Sport and Prime Video
- (Republic of Ireland) Ireland: Sky Sports and Prime Video
- Italy: Sky Sport and Prime Video
- Kosovo: Sport and Prime Video
- Latvia: Disney+, Go3 Sport and Prime Video
- Liechtenstein: Sky Sport and Prime Video.
- Lithuania: Disney+, Go3 Sport and Prime Video
- Luxembourg: DAZN and Prime Video
- Moldova: Setanta Sports and Prime Video
- Montenegro: Arena Sport and Prime Video
- Netherlands: ESPN
- North Macedonia: Arena Sport and Prime Video
- Norway: Rex/HBO Max
- Poland: Eurosport/HBO Max and TVP Sport
- Portugal: Disney+, Sport TV and Prime Video
- Romania: Disney+, Antena Play and Prime Video
- Russia: N/A (MEGOGO was the most recent rights holder in Russia prior to the Russia invasion to Ukraine in 2022. NBA programming of all kinds in Russia has since been discontinued)
- San Marino: Sky Sport and Prime Video
- Serbia: Arena Sport and Prime Video
- Slovakia: Disney+, Nova Sport and Prime Video
- Slovenia: Sport Klub and Prime Video and
- Spain: DAZN and Prime Video
- Sweden: Kanal 9/HBO Max
- Turkey: S Sport and Prime Video
- Switzerland: Sky Sport and Prime Video.
- Ukraine: Maincast and Prime Video
- United Kingdom: Sky Sports and Prime Video.

=== Sub-Saharan Africa ===
- Sub-Saharan Africa: ESPN, Canal+ Sport, SuperSport, Prime Video and NBA TV International
- South Africa: ESPN, SuperSport, Prime Video and Sporty TV
- Ghana, Kenya and Nigeria: Sporty TV

=== Middle East and North Africa ===
- Israel: Sport 5
- (Middle East and North Africa) MENA: beIN Sports and Prime Video

=== Asia-Pacific ===
- Central Asia: Setanta Sports
- China: Tencent, Migu, CCTV and Shanghai Media Group
- Hong Kong: Now Sports, ViuTV, and NBA TV International
- Macau: M Plus
- India: Prime Video
- Indonesia: Disney+, Telkom Indonesia, Prime Video and NBA TV International
- Japan: Lemino, Prime Video and Wowow
- Malaysia: Disney+ and Prime Video
- South Korea: Coupang Play, Disney+ and Prime Video
- Mongolia: Premier Sports Network and Prime Video
- Philippines: One Sports/NBA TV Philippines, Disney+, and Prime Video
- Singapore: Disney+ and Prime Video
- Taiwan: Videoland, ELTA and Hami Video
- Thailand: Disney+, AIS Play and Prime Video
- Tajikistan: Varzish TV
- Vietnam: FPT Play

=== Oceania ===
- Australia, New Zealand, Papua New Guinea and Pacific Islands: ESPN and Prime Video

== See also ==
- NBA TV
- NBA League Pass
- NBA on television
- NBA TV Canada
- NBA TV Philippines
- List of current Major League Baseball broadcasters
- List of current NFL broadcasters
- List of current Major League Soccer broadcasters
- List of current National Hockey League broadcasters
- List of historical NBA over-the-air television broadcasters
- List of current WNBA broadcasters
