= List of NBA on ESPN commentators =

The NBA on ESPN is a presentation of National Basketball Association (NBA) games produced by ESPN and airing on the ESPN networks and ABC in the United States. Games on ESPN air on Wednesdays throughout the regular season and Fridays on selected weeks beginning in January. NBA Countdown and Inside the NBA (produced by TNT Sports) both serve as the studio shows for pregame and halftime, with the latter also airing postgame.

For the 2025–26 season, the lead commentary team consists of Mike Breen (play-by-play), Tim Legler, Richard Jefferson (game analysts), and Lisa Salters (sideline reporter). Breen was previously joined by Jeff Van Gundy and Mark Jackson from 2007 until 2011, when Jackson was hired as head coach of the Golden State Warriors, before returning in 2014. After Van Gundy and Jackson were laid off in 2023, Doris Burke and Doc Rivers were hired as replacements for the 2023–24 season. Burke became the first television analyst for the NBA Finals when she called the series in 2024 and 2025. JJ Redick replaced Rivers in January 2024 after the latter was hired as the head coach of the Milwaukee Bucks. For the 2024–25 season, Jefferson was promoted to the lead broadcast team after Redick became head coach of the Los Angeles Lakers.

== Current ==
=== Play-by-play ===
- Mike Breen – lead play-by-play (2006–present) play-by-play (2003–2006)
- Ryan Ruocco – play-by-play (2013–present)
- Dave Pasch – play-by-play (2006–present)
- Marc Kestecher – alternate play-by-play (2024–present) (also analyst for ESPN Radio)
- Mike Monaco – alternate play-by-play (2026–present)
- Drew Carter – alternate play-by-play (2026–present)
- Jorge Sedano – alternate play-by-play (2026–present) (also reporter for ESPN)

=== Color commentator ===
- Tim Legler – co-lead color commentator (2025–present); color commentator (2006, 2024–2025)
- Richard Jefferson – co-lead color commentator (2024–present)
- Jay Bilas – color commentator (2024–present)
- Doris Burke – color commentator (2017–present)
- P. J. Carlesimo – color commentator (2025–present) (also analyst for ESPN Radio)
- Jason Kidd – color commentator (2026–present)
- Jeremy Lin – color commentator (2026–present)
- Cory Alexander – alternate color commentator (2024–present)
- Danny Green – alternate color commentator (2026–present)
- Stephanie White – alternate color commentator (2024–present)

=== Sideline reporters ===
- Lisa Salters – lead sideline reporter (2004–present)
- Malika Andrews – sideline reporter (2020–2023; 2025–present)
- Katie George – sideline reporter (2022–present)
- Jorge Sedano – sideline reporter (2017–present) (also play-by-play for ESPN)
- Alyssa Lang – sideline reporter (2025–present)
- Angel Gray – sideline reporter (2022–present)
- Vanessa Richardson – sideline reporter (2026–present)
- Taylor McGregor – sideline reporter (2026–present)
- Monica McNutt – alternate sideline reporter (2021–present) (also analyst for ESPN and ESPN Radio)
- Rosalyn Gold-Onwude – alternate sideline reporter (2021–present) (also sideline reporter for ESPN Radio)
- Tim MacMahon – fill-in sideline reporter (2026–present)

=== Rules analyst ===
- Steve Javie (2012–present)

=== Studio host ===
- Malika Andrews – Countdown studio host (2023–present) (also sideline reporter, 2020–present; also worked as ESPN and ABC's sideline reporter for the 2021 NBA Finals)
- Ernie Johnson Jr. – Inside the NBA studio host (2025–present)

=== Studio analysts ===
- Kendrick Perkins – Countdown lead studio analyst (2019–present)
- Brian Windhorst – Countdown co-lead studio analyst (2025–present)
- Jason Kidd – Countdown studio analyst (2026–present)
- Shaquille O'Neal – Inside the NBA studio analyst (2025–present)
- Kenny Smith – Inside the NBA studio analyst and Countdown fill-in (2025–present)
- Charles Barkley – Inside the NBA studio analyst (2025–present)

=== Insider ===
- Shams Charania – insider (2024–present)

=== Contributor ===
- Brian Windhorst – contributor (2021–present)

=== ESPN Radio ===
- Marc Kestecher (lead, also alternate TV play-by-play)
- Sean Kelley (play-by-play)
- Mike Couzens (play-by-play)
- Ed Cohen (play-by-play)
- Jon Barry (game analyst)
- Sarah Kustok (game analyst)
- P. J. Carlesimo (game analyst, alternate TV analyst)
- Cory Alexander (game analyst)

==== Broadcast team ====
Season	Broadcasters
2026–27	Preseason: 1. Mike Breen/Richard Jefferson/Tim Legler, or Danny Green/Jorge Sedano, or Katie George; 2. Ryan Ruocco/Doris Burke/Angel Gray; 3. Mike Monaco/Doris Burke/Angel Gray; 4. Drew Carter/Doris Burke/Taylor McGregor; Opening Week: 1. Mike Breen/Richard Jefferson/Tim Legler/Lisa Salters; 2. Dave Pasch/Doris Burke/Malika Andrews; 3. Ryan Ruocco/Jeremy Lin/Katie George; Rest of season: 1. Mike Breen/Richard Jefferson/Tim Legler/Katie George; 2. Dave Pasch/Doris Burke, or Jeremy Lin/Jorge Sedano; 3. Mike Monaco/Richard Jefferson/Tim Legler/Katie George; 4. Jorge Sedano/Doris Burke/Vanessa Richardson

== Former ==
=== Play-by-play ===
- Adam Amin (2016–2020)
- Brian Custer (2021–2022)
- Jim Durham (2005–2006)
- Terry Gannon (2010–2013)
- Michael Grady (2024–2025)
- Mark Jones (2005–2026)
- Al Michaels (2003–2006)
- Beth Mowins (2021–2024)
- Brent Musburger (2002–2006)
- Brad Nessler (2002–2004)
- John Saunders (2005–2006)
- Mike Tirico (2006–2016)
- Bob Wischusen (2021)

=== Color commentators ===
- Greg Anthony (2002–2008)
- Hubie Brown (2004–2025)
- Rick Carlisle (2007–2008)
- Vince Carter (2020–2023)
- Sean Elliott (2002–2004)
- Len Elmore (alternate, 2004–2006)
- Mark Jackson (2007–2011, 2014–2023)
- Steve Jones (2005–2006)
- Tim Legler (2006)
- Dan Majerle (2003–2004)
- Michael Malone (2026)
- Bob Myers (2023–2025)
- Jack Ramsay (2005)
- JJ Redick (2021–2024)
- Doc Rivers (2003–2004, 2023–2024)
- Tom Tolbert (2002–2003)
- Bill Walton (2002–2003, 2005–2006)
- Jeff Van Gundy (2007–2023)
- Stan Van Gundy (2018–2019)

=== Sideline reporters ===
- David Aldridge (2002–2003)
- Kris Budden (2016–2020)
- Doris Burke (2008–2019)
- Heather Cox (2008–2016)
- Rosalyn Gold-Onwude (2021–2025)
- Israel Gutierrez (2017–2022)
- Ariel Helwani (2019–2021)
- Cassidy Hubbarth (2016–2025)
- Mark Jones (2005–2007)
- Sal Masekela (2002–2003)
- Rachel Nichols (2020–2021)
- Tom Rinaldi (2017–2020)
- Michele Tafoya (2002–2008)
- Allison Williams (2013–2021)

=== Studio hosts ===
- Michelle Beadle (2016–2019)
- Mike Greenberg (2021–2023)
- Rachel Nichols (2018–2021)
- Dan Patrick (2006–2007)
- John Saunders (substitute studio host from 2003 to 2005)
- Stuart Scott (2007–2011)
- Sage Steele (2013–2016)
- Hannah Storm (2011)
- Maria Taylor (2019–2021)
- Mike Tirico (studio host, 2002–2006)

=== Studio analyst ===
- Doug Collins (2013–2016)
- Richard Jefferson (2019–2021)
- Avery Johnson (2008–2010)
- Magic Johnson (2008–2013; 2016–2017; 2021–2022)
- Steve Jones (2004–2005)
- George Karl (2003–2004)
- Michael Malone (2025–2026)
- Bob Myers (2023–2025)
- Chiney Ogwumike (2024–2025)
- Paul Pierce (2017–2021)
- Scottie Pippen (2005–2006)
- Jalen Rose (2012–2023)
- Byron Scott (2004)
- Bill Simmons (2012–2014)
- Stephen A. Smith (2012–2025)
- Tom Tolbert (2002–2004)
- Bill Walton (2002–2003, 2004–2005, 2007–2008)
- Michael Wilbon (2005–2013; 2016–2017; 2021–2024)
- Jay Williams (2019–2021)
- Adrian Wojnarowski (2019–2024)

== All-time broadcast teams ==
Season	Commentators/Reporters
2021–22	Mike Breen/Jeff Van Gundy/Mark Jackson/Lisa Salters; Mark Jones/Jeff Van Gundy/Mark Jackson/Lisa Salters (Game 7, ECF; Game 2, NBA Finals); Mark Jones/Mark Jackson/Lisa Salters (Game 1, NBA Finals)
2022–23	Mike Breen/Jeff Van Gundy/Mark Jackson/Lisa Salters; Mark Jones/Doris Burke/Cassidy Hubbarth; Dave Pasch/Hubie Brown/Monica McNutt; Ryan Ruocco/JJ Redick/Cassidy Hubbarth
2023–24	Mike Breen/Doris Burke/Doc Rivers/Lisa Salters (until January 2024); Mike Breen/Doris Burke/Lisa Salters (January-February 2024); Mike Breen/Doris Burke/JJ Redick/Lisa Salters (February-June 2024); Ryan Ruocco/Richard Jefferson/JJ Redick (until January 2024)
2024–25	Mark Jones/Doris Burke; Mark Jones/Richard Jefferson/Lisa Salters; Mike Breen/Hubie Brown/Lisa Salters (Hubie Brown's final broadcast)
2025–26	Mike Breen/Richard Jefferson/Tim Legler/Lisa Salters; Dave Pasch/Doris Burke/Jorge Sedano; Ryan Ruocco/Doris Burke/Jorge Sedano (Christmas Day); Mark Jones/Jay Bilas/Katie George (Christmas Day); Dave Pasch/PJ Carlesimo/Malika Andrews (Christmas Day); Marc Kestecher/Stephanie White/Alyssa Lang (Christmas Day); Mark Jones/Doris Burke/Angel Gray (Mark Jones's final broadcast); Dave Pasch/Tim Legler/Taylor McGregor (regular season finale)
