= List of NBA on TNT commentators =

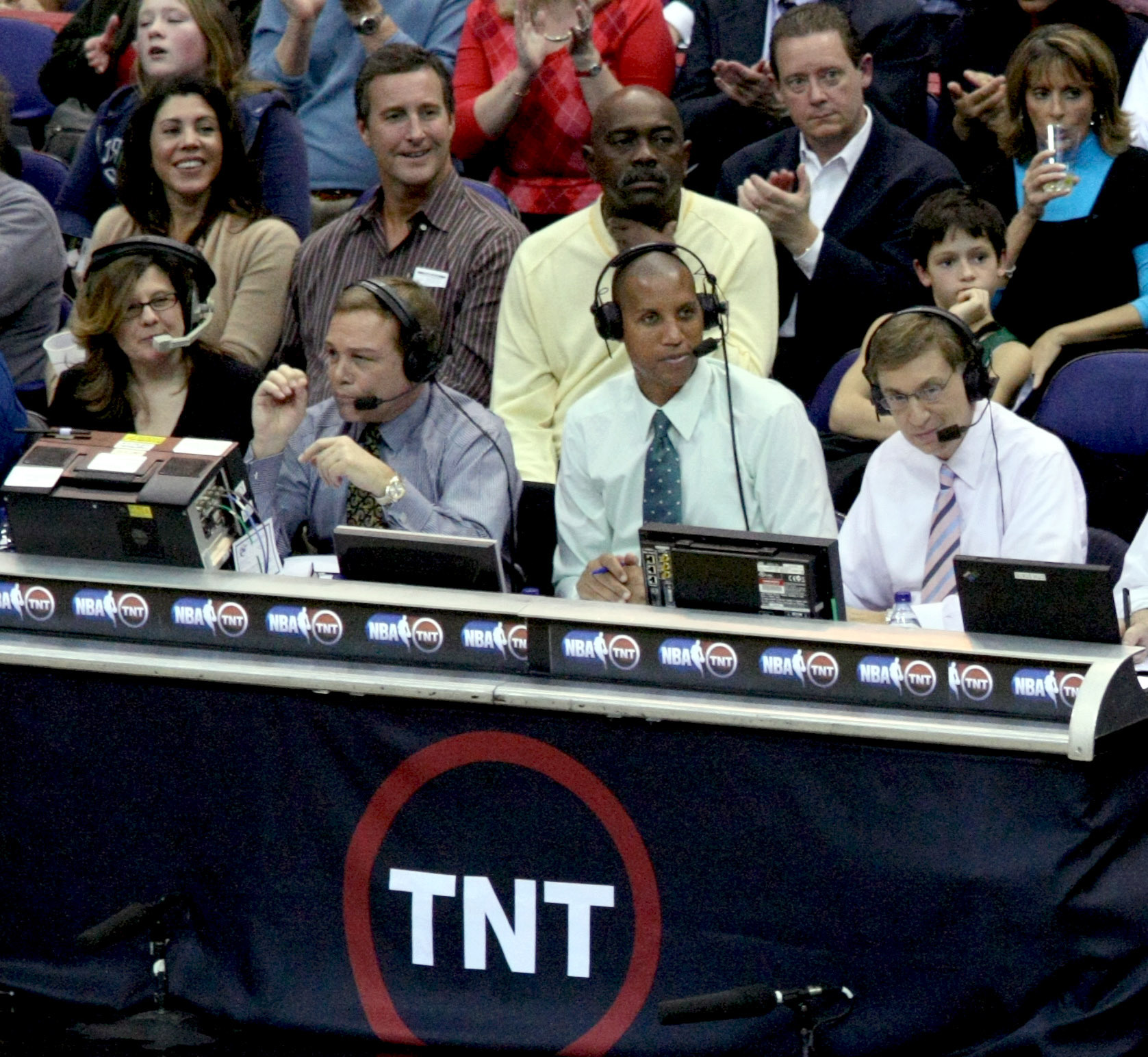
Marv Albert, Reggie Miller, and Mike Fratello commentate an NBA game for TNT.

The NBA on TNT is a presentation of National Basketball Association (NBA) games produced by TNT Sports. In the United States, games were broadcast by the cable network TNT, with simulcasts and alternate broadcasts airing on TruTV and TBS. Games also streamed on Warner Bros. Discovery's (WBD) streaming service Max. The coverage also included the studio show Inside the NBA, which aired before and after the game and during halftime. TNT aired Tuesday and Thursday night games, as well as playoff games for the majority of the first and second rounds, as well as one conference finals every year.

In July 2024, TNT filed a lawsuit against the NBA, who rejected TNT's annual billion-dollar offer to match the deal made by future broadcaster Amazon. That November, both parties reached a settlement, with WBD signing a sub-licensing agreement with the Walt Disney Company to broadcast Inside the NBA on ESPN and ABC.

TNT Sports's final roster of commentators included play-by-play commentators Kevin Harlan, Brian Anderson, Ian Eagle, and Spero Dedes; game and studio analysts Reggie Miller, Stan Van Gundy, Grant Hill, Greg Anthony, and Vince Carter; and sideline reporters Allie LaForce, Lauren Jbara, Stephanie Ready, and Jared Greenberg. Inside the NBA consisted of Ernie Johnson Jr., Shaquille O'Neal, Kenny Smith, and Charles Barkley.

== List ==
=== Full-time ===
- Danny Ainge: game analyst; now CEO of Utah Jazz
- Marv Albert: lead play-by-play (1999–2021)
- David Aldridge: lead sideline Reporter (2004–2025)
- Brian Anderson: play-by-play (2019–2025); now play-by-play announcer for CBB on TNT and lead play-by-play announcer for MLB on TBS
- Greg Anthony: game analyst; now game analyst for CBB on TNT
- Charles Barkley: studio analyst (2000–2025); now at ESPN/ABC for Inside the NBA, which is still produced by TNT Sports
- Rick Barry: game analyst
- Gary Bender: alternate play-by-play (1992–1995, 2004, 2009)
- Mike Breen: play-by-play (2002–2004); now lead play-by-play announcer for ESPN/ABC and MSG Network
- Tim Brando: play-by-play and studio analyst (1994–1996); now at Fox Sports
- Hubie Brown: game analyst (1990–2002)
- Bryan Burwell: sideline reporter (deceased)
- Kevin Calabro: play-by-play; now lead play-by-play announcer for Portland Trail Blazers
- Chip Caray: play-by-play, now at FanDuel Sports Network Midwest
- Skip Caray: play-by-play (1989–1990) (deceased)
- P. J. Carlesimo: alternate game analyst; now at ESPN/ABC and Pac-12 Network
- Vince Carter: studio analyst (2024–2025), now studio analyst for NBC
- Vince Cellini: studio analyst
- Rex Chapman: game analyst (2004–2005 NBA Playoffs)
- Doug Collins: game analyst (1989–1994, 2003–2010); now senior advisor of basketball operations of Chicago Bulls
- Jamal Crawford: studio analyst (2022–2023); now lead game analyst for NBC
- Chuck Daly: game analyst (1994–1997) (deceased)
- Charles Davis: sideline reporter - NBA Playoffs
- Spero Dedes: play-by-play; now play-by-play announcer for CBB on TNT and NFL on CBS
- Jim Durham: play-by-play (deceased)
- Ian Eagle: play-by-play (2011–2025); now lead play-by-play announcer for Prime Video, NFL on Westwood One Sports and play-by-play announcer for NFL on CBS.
- Marc Fein: sideline reporter (NBA playoffs only) and substitute studio host
- Kevin Garnett: studio analyst (2016–2018)
- Ros Gold-Onwude: sideline reporter (2017–2019); now at ESPN.
- Jared Greenberg: sideline reporter and play-by-play (2020–2025); now sideline reporter for CBB on TNT
- Kevin Harlan: play-by-play (1996–2021); lead play-by-play (2021–2025), now play-by-play announcer for Prime Video, NFL on Westwood One Sports and NFL on CBS.
- Rebecca Haarlow: sideline reporter (NBA playoffs only)
- Fred Hickman: lead studio analyst (1989–1995) (deceased)
- Todd Harris: sideline reporter (NBA playoffs only)
- Chris Haynes: sideline reporter; now inside analyst for Prime Video
- Grant Hill: studio analyst and game analyst (2015–2025); now game analyst for CBB on TNT and NBA on NBC
- Jim Jackson: alternative game analyst
- Lauren Jbara: sideline reporter (2024–2025); now reporter for MLB on TBS
- Ernie Johnson: lead studio analyst (1989–2025); now at ESPN/ABC for Inside the NBA, which is still produced by TNT Sports
- Lewis Johnson: alternate sideline reporter (NBA Playoffs only) (2011–2017)
- Steve Kerr: lead analyst (2003–2007, 2010–2014); now head coach of Golden State Warriors
- Allie LaForce: lead sideline reporter (2018–2025); now sideline reporter at Big 12 Conference and CBB on TNT
- Kristen Ledlow: sideline reporter (2019–2021)
- Adam Lefkoe: lead studio analyst (2023–2025); now studio host at Big 12 Conference and CBB on TNT
- Lisa Leslie: studio analyst
- Verne Lundquist: play-by-play
- Dei Lynam: sideline reporter (NBA Playoffs only) (2010–2015)
- Kevin McHale: game analyst and studio analyst
- Joel Meyers: game analyst (1st round of 2014, 2020 and 2021 NBA Playoffs)
- Cheryl Miller: sideline reporter, studio analyst (1997–2013) now women's basketball head coach at CSULA
- Reggie Miller: co-lead game analyst (2005–2025); now lead game analyst for NBC
- Steve Nash: studio analyst (2019–2020); now game and studio analyst for Prime Video
- Bob Neal: play-by-play (1989–1999)
- Rachel Nichols: sideline reporter (2013–2016)
- Shaquille O'Neal: studio analyst (2011–2025); now at ESPN/ABC for Inside the NBA, which is still produced by TNT Sports
- Pam Oliver: sideline reporter NBA playoffs (2004–2009); now at Fox Sports
- Candace Parker: studio analyst (2023–2025); now game and studio analyst for Prime Video
- Gary Payton: alternative studio analyst
- Mel Proctor: play-by-play
- Stephanie Ready: sideline reporter (2018–2025)
- Doc Rivers: game analyst (1996–1999); now head coach of Milwaukee Bucks
- Taylor Rooks: sideline reporter (2023–2025); now studio host for Prime Video
- Jalen Rose: sideline reporter (2006 NBA playoffs only) and studio guest analyst (2023–2025); now studio analyst for CBB on TNT
- Craig Sager: sideline reporter (1996–2016) (deceased)
- Dennis Scott: game analyst and Sideline reporter- select Regular season and NBA Playoffs
- Kenny Smith: studio analyst (1997–2025); now at ESPN/ABC for Inside the NBA, which is still produced by TNT Sports
- Steve Smith: alternative game analyst
- Casey Stern: studio analyst and sideline reporter - NBA Playoffs only
- Marty Snider: sideline reporter (NBA playoffs only), now at NBC Sports.
- Dick Stockton: play-by-play (1995–2015)
- Molly Sullivan: alternative sideline reporter (1st round of 2014 NBA playoffs)
- Reggie Theus: studio analyst
- Ron Thulin: play-by-play; now play-by-play announcer for Dallas Wings
- John Thompson: game analyst (deceased)
- Jeff Van Gundy: game analyst (2002–2003) - NBA playoffs only
- Stan Van Gundy: co-lead game analyst (2021–2025); now game analyst for Prime Video
- Pete Van Wieren: play-by-play (deceased)
- Peter Vecsey: studio analyst
- Dick Versace: game analyst (1992–1997) (deceased)
- Dwyane Wade: Tuesday studio analyst (2019–2022), now game and studio analyst for Prime Video
- Chris Webber: co-lead analyst and fill-in studio analyst (2008–2021)
- Matt Winer: alternative studio analyst and sideline reporter (NBA playoffs only)
- Tracy Wolfson: sideline reporter - alternate NBA regular season and NBA playoffs (2011–2016); now at CBS Sports

=== Part-time ===
- Chris Bosh: studio analyst (2019)
- Matt Devlin: alternative play-by-play (2025 - 1st round of NBA Playoffs only); now at TSN and Sportsnet
- Mike Dunleavy Sr.: alternative game analyst- Select NBA Playoff games (2008)
- Bob Fitzgerald: alternative play-by-play (2020 - 1st round of NBA Playoffs only)
- Kevin Frazier: alternative studio analyst
- Jack Givens: game analyst
- Draymond Green: guest studio analyst (2024–2025)
- Jen Hale: sideline reporter (1st round of NBA Playoffs) (2017)
- Gus Johnson: Playoffs play-by-play (2022/2023 - 1st round of NBA Playoffs only); now at Fox Sports
- Magic Johnson: guest studio analyst (2002–2008)
- Bob Lorenz: alternative studio analyst
- Flip Saunders: game analyst for NBA playoffs (2014) (deceased)
- Isiah Thomas: alternative studio analyst
- Bill Walton: game analyst (deceased)
