= NBA on Prime Video =

NBA and WNBA basketball telecasts aired by Amazon Prime Video

- Also known as: WNBA on Prime Video
- Genre: NBA game telecasts
- Theme music composer: Common, Karriem Riggins, James Poyser
- Opening theme: "Victory"
- Country of origin: United States
- Original language: English

Production
- Production locations: Various NBA & WNBA arenas Culver Studios, Culver City, California (studio)
- Running time: 150 minutes or until game ends
- Production company: Sports on Amazon Prime Video

Original release
- Network: Amazon Prime Video (WNBA on Prime Video)
- Release: May 29, 2021 – present
- Network: Amazon Prime Video (NBA on Prime Video)
- Release: October 24, 2025 – present

The NBA on Prime Video (or simply known as the NBA on Prime) is an American television sports presentation show used for National Basketball Association (NBA) games on the subscription video on-demand over-the-top streaming and rental service Amazon Prime Video.

Since 2021, Prime Video has also aired the WNBA on Prime Video.

== Overview ==
=== WNBA coverage ===
In May 2021, the Women's National Basketball Association (WNBA) announced a three-year rights agreement with Amazon Prime Video. As part of the agreement, Prime Video acquired the exclusive global rights (excluding China, Japan, the United Kingdom, Italy, Spain, Finland, and Germany) to 16 WNBA games per season along with the WNBA Commissioner's Cup final. The agreement marked the first time Prime Video acquired the exclusive global rights to a women's professional sports league. In April 2024, the WNBA and Prime Video announced a two-year extension of the agreement. The extension increases Prime Video's exclusive regular season games from 16 to 20. Prime Video will continue to air the Commissioner's Cup final.

=== NBA rights deal, WNBA renewal ===
On October 20, 2022, Prime Video acquired the rights to broadcast the National Basketball Association (NBA) during the 2022–23 season in Brazil.

On July 24, 2024, Prime Video announced an 11-year rights agreement with the NBA and an 11-year extension with the WNBA beginning with the 2025–26 NBA season and 2026 WNBA season respectively. For the NBA, Prime Video will hold the rights to 66 regular season games per season in the US (86 in various international markets), the knockout rounds (including the semifinals and the finals) of the NBA Cup, all NBA Play-In Tournament games, select first and second-round NBA playoffs games, and 6 NBA Conference Finals, airing one series on odd years plus the final season of the contract in the US (with one NBA Conference finals and 6 of the 11 NBA finals for various international markets). For the WNBA, Prime Video has the rights to 30 regular season games per season, one series of the first round of WNBA playoffs each season, 7 WNBA Semifinals and 3 WNBA Finals, while continuing to air the WNBA Commissioner's Cup final.

The agreement was announced despite the fact, two days prior, TNT Sports announced that it had exercised a clause in its contract with the NBA to match the NBA's contract with Amazon. Because the NBA did not reach an agreement with TNT prior to the match, TNT would have lost the rights to the NBA if they had not exercised the clause. When the NBA announced that Amazon had officially acquired the rights, the NBA revealed they had rejected TNT's attempt because TNT was unable to fully match the terms of Amazon's contract. TNT released a response arguing the NBA had "grossly misinterpreted our contractual rights" forcing TNT to take "appropriate action". On July 26, 2024, Warner Bros. Discovery (WBD), the parent company of TNT Sports, filed its lawsuit against the league in a Manhattan New York state court, seeking to delay the NBA's new 2025 media deals from taking effect and to rule that TNT's offer matched Amazon's deal.

In September 2024, WBD accused the NBA of including "purposely onerous or immaterial" conditions in the Amazon contract that would have made it logistically impossible for TNT to match the contract, including a provision that the NBA coverage must be aired on a platform that also carries National Football League (NFL) games (alluding to Amazon's rights to Thursday Night Football). On November 16, WBD and the NBA agreed to a legal settlement, effectively clearing the way for Amazon to become an NBA media partner without any litigation.

== Commentators ==
Unlike ESPN or NBC, the NBA on Prime does not designate a top play-by-play voice or have fixed teams, rather it will attempt to rotate its broadcast teams amongst its various personnel. NBA on Prime games are called by play-by-play announcers Ian Eagle, Kevin Harlan, Michael Grady, and Eric Collins. Eagle and Harlan are considered Prime Video's top two play-by-play voices, having joined Prime Video after longtime stints at TNT. Color commentators for Prime Video's broadcasts include Stan Van Gundy, Brent Barry, Jim Jackson, and Dell Curry. Steve Nash, Candace Parker and Dwyane Wade can also commentate on games under agreements which allow the three to serve as color commentators and studio analysts. Prime Video's team of sideline reporters include Cassidy Hubbarth, Allie Clifton, Kristina Pink and JayDee Dyer.

The NBA on Prime studio show will be hosted by Taylor Rooks. Blake Griffin, Dirk Nowitzki, Dwyane Wade, Steve Nash, Candace Parker, Udonis Haslem, John Wall, Rudy Gay, Kyle Lowry and Zach Lowe are all rotated as studio analysts.

On September 23 2025, NBA on Prime also added Swin Cash as special contributor.

For the 2026 NBA Finals, Prime Video produced bespoke coverage for select international markets, with WNBA on Prime studio analyst and NBA on Prime sideline reporter Allie Clifton hosting the broadcasts, joined by analysts Vlade Divac, Chris Bosh, Danilo Gallinari and Nicolas Batum. In addition, Todd Harris, Mo Mooncey, Liam Canny, Azania Stewart, Nick Halling, Drew Lasker, Darren Kilfara and Rob Paternostro would provide play-by-play and color commentary on each of the games for international audiences, with NBA on Prime's #3 sideline reporter Kristina Pink reporting from courtside. Viewers would also have access to ABC's broadcasts as an alternate audio feed.

=== NBA Announcers ===
==== Play-by-play ====
- Ian Eagle – lead play-by-play (2025–present)
- Kevin Harlan – secondary play-by-play (2025–present)
- Michael Grady – #3 play-by-play (2025–present)
- Eric Collins – #4 play-by-play (2025–present)

==== Color commentators ====
- Stan Van Gundy – lead color commentator (2025–present)
- Brent Barry – #2 color commentator (2025–present)
- Jim Jackson – #3 color commentator (2025–present)
- Dell Curry – #4 color commentator (2025–present)
- Dwyane Wade – rotating color commentator (2025–present)
- Steve Nash – rotating color commentator (2025–present)
- Candace Parker – rotating color commentator (2025–present)

==== Sideline reporter ====
- Cassidy Hubbarth – lead sideline reporter (2025–present)
- Allie Clifton – #2 sideline reporter (2025–present)
- Kristina Pink – #3 sideline reporter (2025–present)
- JayDee Dyer – alternate sideline reporter (2025–present)

==== Studio analyst ====
- Taylor Rooks – studio host (2025–present)
- Blake Griffin – studio analyst (2025–present)
- Dirk Nowitzki – studio analyst (2025–present)
- Udonis Haslem – studio analyst (2025–present)
- Steve Nash – rotating studio analyst (2025–present)
- Dwyane Wade – rotating studio analyst (2025–present)
- Candace Parker – rotating studio analyst (2025–present)
- John Wall – studio analyst (2025–present)
- Rudy Gay – studio analyst (2025–present)
- Kyle Lowry – studio analyst (2025–present)
- Zach Lowe – studio analyst (2025–present)

==== Contributor ====
- Swin Cash – contributor (2025–present)

==== Broadcast team ====
| Season | Broadcasters |
|---|---|
| 2026–27 | Opening Week: 1. Ian Eagle/Stan Van Gundy/Dwyane Wade/Cassidy Hubbarth; 2. Kevin Harlan/Candace Parker/Allie Clifton; Rest of season: 1. Ian Eagle/Stan Van Gundy/Steve Nash/Cassidy Hubbarth; 2. Michael Grady/Brent Barry/Allie Clifton; 3. Kevin Harlan/Jim Jackson/Allie Clifton |

=== WNBA Announcers ===
==== Play-by-play ====
- Michael Grady – lead play-by-play (2026–present)
- Lisa Byington – #2 play-by-play (2026–present)
- Mike Watts – #3 play-by-play (2026–present)

==== Color commentators ====
- Candace Parker – lead and rotating color commentator (2026–present)
- LaChina Robinson – #2 color commentator (2026–present)
- Kara Lawson – #3 color commentator (2026–present)
- Cynthia Cooper – rotating color commentator (2026–present)
- Stan Van Gundy - alternate color commentator (2026–present)

==== Sideline reporter ====
- JayDee Dyer – lead sideline reporter (2026–present)
- Kayla Grey – #2 sideline reporter (2026–present)
- Morgan Ragan – #3 sideline reporter (2026–present)
- Britney Eurton – alternate sideline reporter (2026–present)

==== Studio analyst ====
- Allie Clifton – studio host (2026–present)
- Swin Cash – studio host and analyst (2026–present)
- Lindsey Harding – studio analyst (2026–present)
- Teresa Weatherspoon – studio analyst (2026–present)
- Ty Young – studio analyst (2026–present)
- Candace Parker – rotating studio analyst (2026–present)
- Cynthia Cooper – rotating studio analyst (2026–present)

==== Contributor ====
- Kelsey Plum – contributor (2026–present)

== Regional coverage ==
In April 2022, the Seattle Storm of the WNBA announced an agreement to stream their regional games on Prime Video for subscribers within the team's market. The game broadcasts are also carried by Sinclair Broadcast Group's KUNS-TV and KOMO-TV.

In October 2026, the Atlanta Hawks announced an agreement with Amazon to stream their regional games on Prime Video for subscribers within the team's market. The game broadcasts are produced by Raycom Sports and are also aired by Gray Media's WANF and Peachtree Sports Network.

== See also ==
- NFL on Prime Video
- NHL on Prime Video
- List of current NBA broadcasters
- List of current WNBA broadcasters

| Preceded by None | WNBA pay television carrier 2021–present with ESPN (2021–present) with CBSSN (2021–2025) with USA/Peacock (2026–present) | Succeeded by Incumbent |
| Preceded by TNT | NBA pay television carrier 2025–present with ESPN and NBCSN/Peacock | Succeeded by Incumbent |
