= Taylor Rooks =

American sports journalist (born 1992)

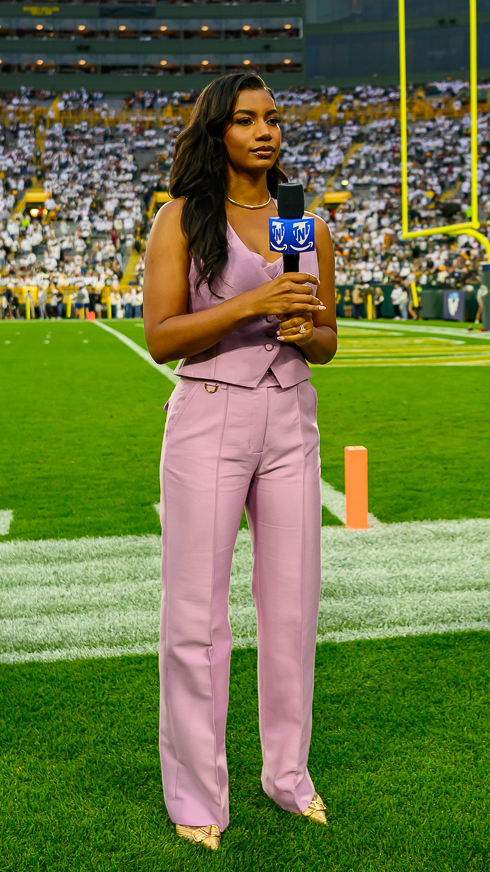
- Rooks in 2025
- Born: May 22, 1992 (age 34); St. Louis, Missouri, U.S.
- Education: University of Illinois at Urbana-Champaign
- Occupation: Sportscaster
- Years active: 2012–present
- Spouse: Shane Fowler (m. 2025)

Taylor Rooks (born May 22, 1992) is an American sports journalist and broadcaster. She appears on Thursday Night Football (on Prime Video), Bleacher Report and TNT Sports. Before joining the Turner networks, she was a host, reporter, and correspondent at SportsNet New York (SNY). Prior to the New York market, she worked for the Big Ten Network. She appeared on BTN Live, BTN Football Pregame, and Women's Sports Report. She was a sideline reporter for CBS Sports Network for the 2016–2017 football season. Prior to SNY, CBS, and BTN, Rooks was a football and basketball recruiting reporter for scout.com. She has an on-air presence for major events, such as the Big Ten Football Championship.

== Early life ==
Rooks attended Peachtree Ridge High School in Suwanee, Georgia, from which she graduated in 2010.

Rooks decided to follow in her parents' footsteps by attending the University of Illinois at Urbana-Champaign, where she majored in broadcast journalism. During her time at the University of Illinois, Rooks covered and broke national football/basketball recruiting stories while working with Scout.com. She appeared on CBS Sports Network reporting on the WBB Pre-NIT Championship at 19 years old. Throughout college, she interned with the PGA Tour, Comcast SportsNet Chicago, and Fox Sports/Scout.com. She received numerous scholarships in her time in Champaign, and helped expand women's interest in broadcasting. Rooks modeled briefly, but turned her focus to sports journalism.

Rooks comes from a family of athletes. She is the daughter of Thomas Rooks, who is second on the all-time rushing list for the Illinois Fighting Illini; the grandniece of St. Louis Cardinals Hall of Famer Lou Brock; and the niece of former Pittsburgh Steelers and New Orleans Saints NFL player Marv Woodson.

== Career ==
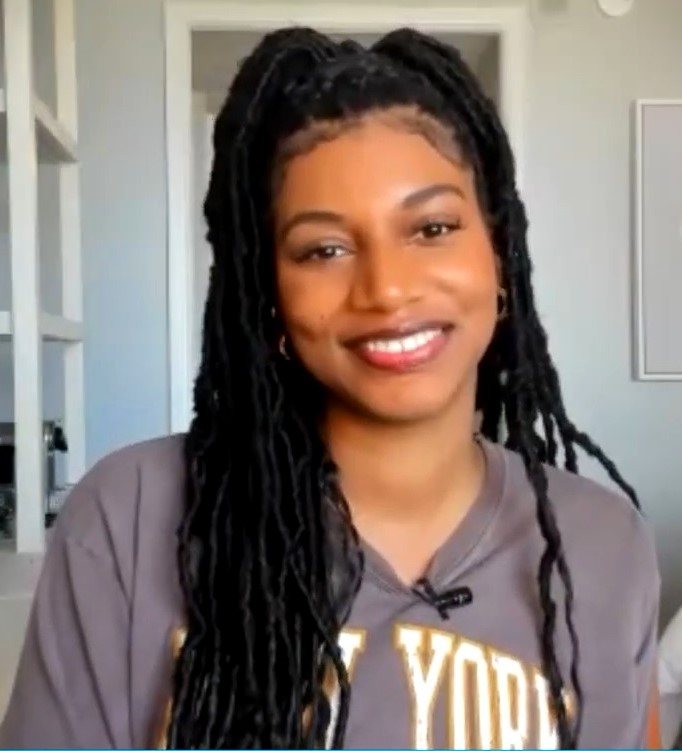
Rooks in 2022

From August 2012 to May 2014, Rooks worked with Scout.com covering Illinois football and basketball. She made national news with her stories and perspective on the game - specifically in recruiting. Rooks broke multiple stories regarding Cliff Alexander, Jalen Brunson, Quentin Snider, Charles Matthews, and Jayson Tatum.

In August 2014—two months out of college—Rooks became an on-air host, reporter, and correspondent for the Big Ten Network. She appeared nightly on the popular sports television show, BTN Live, alongside Dave Revsine, Mike Hall, and Rick Pizzo, and analysts such as Jim Jackson, Chuck Long, and Glen Mason. One of her roles was to interact with fans and bring their social media topics onto the screen. Rooks regularly reported on Big Ten Games, and travelled frequently for television shows. She hosted the Women's Sports Report, alongside Lisa Byington, covering all women's sports in the Big Ten.

In August 2016, Rooks became a host, reporter, and anchor for SportsNet New York. Rooks was also a sideline reporter for CBS Sports Network for the 2016–2017 college football season.

In June 2018, Rooks joined Bleacher Report. She made appearances at the Super Bowl, NBA All-Star Game and on numerous Turner Sports programming. Rooks also hosted the NBA on TNT live stream experience.

Rooks was hired by Amazon Prime Video to contribute to their pregame, halftime and postgame shows for Thursday Night Football prior to the 2022 season. Rooks also added sideline reporting duties for TNT Sports in 2023, first reporting for select college basketball games, then adding NBA games during the 2024–25 season.

Rooks serves as a broadcaster for the Puppy Bowl.

Starting with the 2025–26 season, Rooks leads NBA on Prime Video's studio coverage. She has been joined by Dirk Nowitzki and Blake Griffin, as well as Steve Nash and Udonis Haslem. Rooks will continue to appear on Thursday Night Football.

== Personal life ==
Rooks has been rumored to be linked to a few celebrities, but she has refuted these reports, stating, "The internet has never once been right about anyone I'm dating. And that's by design. Because whoever I'm with I'm not gonna be seen in public with. I just think that it's something that is very sacred and personal."

On July 19, 2025, Rooks married her fiancé Shane Fowler in a private wedding ceremony in New York City.
