= Eric Collins =

American sportscaster (born 1969)

- Born: June 16, 1969 (age 57); Cleveland, Ohio, U.S.
- Education: St. Lawrence University; Syracuse University
- Years active: 1997–present
- Sports commentary career
- Team: Charlotte Hornets
- Genre: Play-by-play
- Sport: Basketball
- Employer: FanDuel Sports Network Southeast; NBA on Prime Video (Amazon Prime)

Eric Collins (born June 16, 1969) is an American play-by-play sports announcer. He is currently the voice of the NBA's Charlotte Hornets on FanDuel Sports Network Southeast and a play-by-play announcer for NBA on Prime on Amazon Prime Video alongside Ian Eagle, Kevin Harlan, and Michael Grady. He also occasionally announces games for NFL on Fox alongside Mark Schlereth and Jen Hale.

== Education ==
Born in Cleveland, Ohio, Collins is a graduate of St. Lawrence University. He earned a master's degree from Syracuse University's S. I. Newhouse School of Public Communications in 1992.

== Career ==
Collins first worked as a sideline reporter for the Chicago Bulls from 1997 to 2002. In 2002, Collins substituted for Mike Tirico on College Football on ABC, along with analyst Irving Fryar.

Collins' broadcasting experience includes college basketball and softball Super Regional tournaments. In 2004 and 2008, Collins was a part-time announcer for the Chicago White Sox. He also worked in Minor League Baseball, announcing for the Schaumburg Flyers and Rochester Red Wings. In 2005 and 2006, he worked the Women's College World Series games. Collins has been a member of the broadcasting team of the World Cup of Softball on ESPN since 2005, along with his broadcast partner, Michele Smith. In 2008, Collins announced the play-by-play for NBC Sports' coverage of the USA Baseball team during the Beijing 2008 Summer Olympics.

From 2009 through 2013, Collins served as the part-time television voice of the Los Angeles Dodgers, taking over the duties of Dodger radio voice Charley Steiner, who was the team's play-by-play announcer on road telecasts calling games east of Phoenix.

In August 2010, the Big Ten Network announced that Collins would handle play-by-play duties in college football and basketball. He also does play-by-play announcing for Fox College Hoops. He was the announcer for the Stephen F. Austin Lumberjacks win over Duke in Cameron Indoor Stadium on November 26, 2019.

On August 27, 2015, Collins was named the new television play-by-play announcer for the Charlotte Hornets, replacing Steve Martin, who returned to his original role as the team's radio play-by-play voice. Collins was joined by former Hornet, Dell Curry and Stephanie Ready, the NBA's first full-time female analyst.

In 2021, Collins announced for The Basketball Tournament 2021 alongside long-time TBT analyst Fran Fraschilla.

In 2022, Collins returned to college football as the announcer for FS1's coverage of Duke vs. Northwestern on September 10, 2022.

Prior to the 2025-26 season, Collins was added to the broadcast team for the NBA on Prime Video, joining Ian Eagle, Kevin Harlan, and Michael Grady as play-by-play announcers.

On October 5, 2025, Collins worked as a play-by-play announcer on NFL on Fox's coverage of a game between the Miami Dolphins and the Carolina Panthers, which was his first time calling a National Football League (NFL) game.

When Collins announced an NFL on Fox game between the Cincinnati Bengals and Miami Dolphins on October 11, 2026, his voice briefly cracked when Bengals wide receiver Ja'Marr Chase scored a 45-yard one-handed touchdown catch while airborne. When Collins saw Chase's airborne one-handed touchdown catch, he enthusiastically screamed "AAAAaaaaoooooHhhhhhh! Ja'Marr Chase you're kiddinggggggg!!!! GOOD GOLLY!" live on-air. Several NFL fans were pleased to see him back in the broadcast booth.

== Media ==
In 2024, Collins was profiled in a short film directed by Joey Garfield, titled It's On Like a Pot of Neckbones: Inside the Mind of Eric Collins. The film includes snippets of footage of Collins announcing games, as well as details of the tactics he uses for preparation and some examples of his score cards and notes from previous games.
