= KFFX =

KFFX may refer to:

- KFFX (FM), a radio station (104.9 FM) licensed to Emporia, Kansas, United States
- KFFX-TV, a television station (channel 11) licensed to Pendleton, Oregon, United States
