= Richard Jefferson =

American basketball player (born 1980)

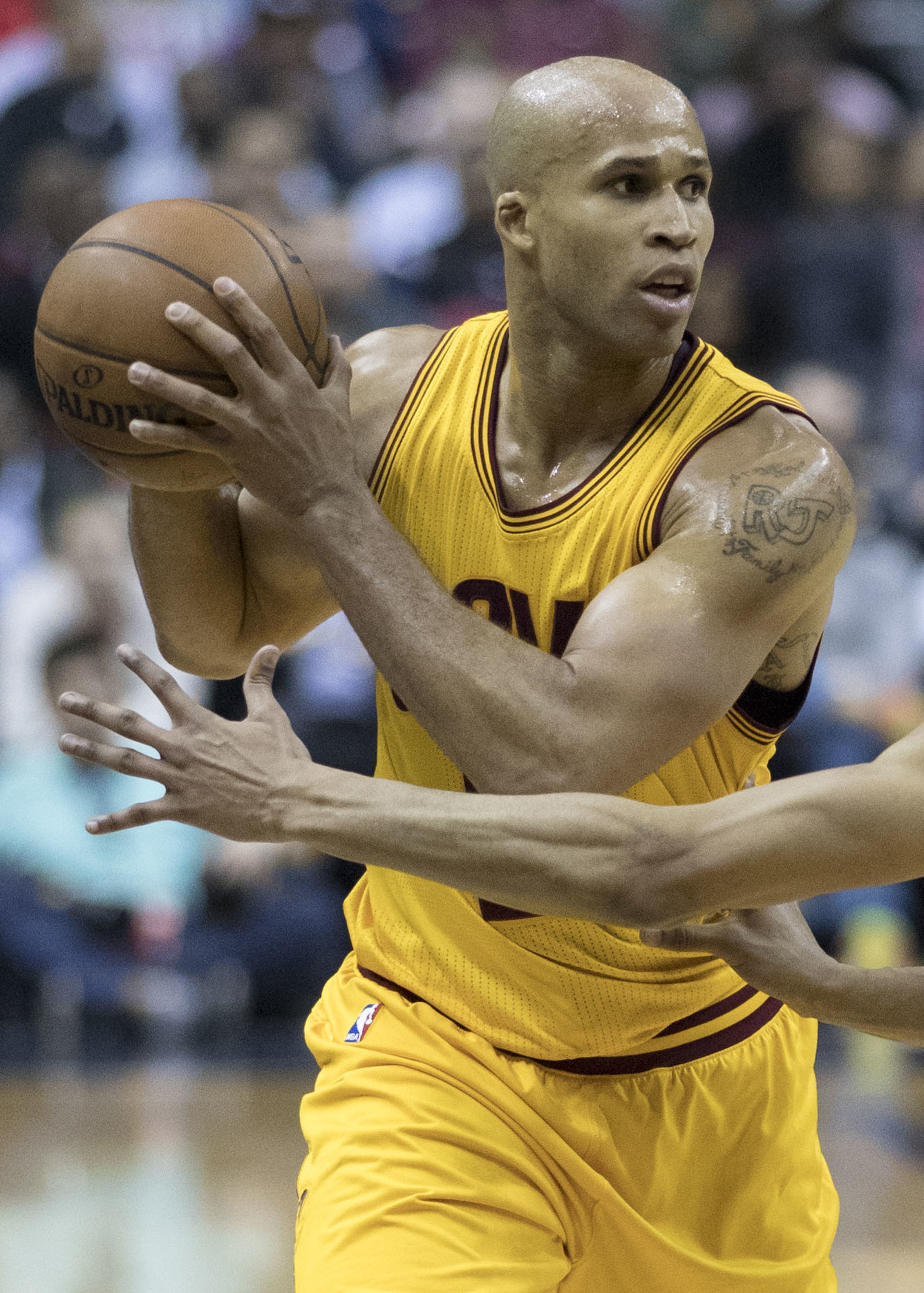
- Jefferson with the Cleveland Cavaliers in 2017

Personal information
- Born: June 21, 1980 (age 46) Los Angeles, California, U.S.
- Listed height: 6 ft 7 in (2.01 m)
- Listed weight: 233 lb (106 kg)

Career information
- High school: Moon Valley (Phoenix, Arizona)
- College: Arizona (1998–2001)
- NBA draft: 2001: 1st round, 13th overall pick
- Drafted by: Houston Rockets
- Playing career: 2001–2018
- Position: Small forward
- Number: 24, 44, 22

Career history
- 2001–2008: New Jersey Nets
- 2008–2009: Milwaukee Bucks
- 2009–2012: San Antonio Spurs
- 2012–2013: Golden State Warriors
- 2013–2014: Utah Jazz
- 2014–2015: Dallas Mavericks
- 2015–2017: Cleveland Cavaliers
- 2017–2018: Denver Nuggets

Career highlights
- NBA champion (2016); NBA All-Rookie Second Team (2002); McDonald's All-American (1998); Fourth-team Parade All-American (1998)

Career NBA statistics
- Points: 14,904 (12.6 ppg)
- Rebounds: 4,720 (4.0 rpg)
- Assists: 2,412 (2.0 apg)
- Stats at NBA.com
- Stats at Basketball Reference
Medals
Men's basketball
Representing the United States
Olympic Games
Bronze medal – third place	2004 Athens	Team
FIBA Americas Championship
Gold medal – first place	2003 San Juan

Richard Allen Jefferson Jr. (born June 21, 1980) is an American former professional basketball player who played small forward. He played for eight teams during his 17-season career in the National Basketball Association (NBA).

Jefferson played college basketball for the Arizona Wildcats, and was selected with the 13th overall pick in the first round by the New Jersey Nets in the 2001 NBA draft. He was named to the NBA All-Rookie Second Team following his first season. Jefferson played seven seasons for the Nets, reaching the NBA Finals in each of his first two seasons. He later played for the Milwaukee Bucks, San Antonio Spurs, Golden State Warriors, Utah Jazz, Dallas Mavericks, Cleveland Cavaliers, and Denver Nuggets. He won an NBA championship with the Cavaliers in 2016 and a bronze medal as a member of the United States national team in the 2004 Summer Olympics. Jefferson retired from the NBA in 2018, becoming a basketball analyst for ESPN in 2019.

== Early life ==
Jefferson was born in Los Angeles and was raised in Phoenix. His mother and stepfather were both Christian missionaries, and he moved around frequently growing up. Jefferson attended Moon Valley High School in West Phoenix, where he was an integral part of the varsity basketball team that won the 4A State Championship in 1998.

== College career ==
Jefferson played college basketball at the University of Arizona, under Hall of Fame coach Lute Olson from 1998 to 2001. During his 84-game career (77 starts), Jefferson averaged 11.2 points, 5.0 rebounds and 2.8 assists per game. He capped his career by being part of the Arizona team that advanced to the 2001 national championship game where the Wildcats fell to Duke. Along the way, Jefferson was an all-Midwest Regional and all-Final Four selection. He was inducted into the Pac-12 Basketball Hall of Honor during the 2012 Pac-12 Conference men's basketball tournament on March 10, 2012.

== Professional career ==
=== New Jersey Nets (2001–2008) ===
Jefferson played seven seasons with the New Jersey Nets and was a key element of their back-to-back Eastern Conference Championship teams of 2002 and 2003. He played in the NBA Finals with the Nets in each of his first two seasons. In addition, Jefferson was a member of the USA Men's Olympic basketball team in the 2004 Summer Olympics. Jefferson competed in the NBA Slam Dunk Contest in 2003.

Jefferson began his career as a substitute small forward for Keith Van Horn and showed great defensive skills and all-around ability. Because of his potential, and Van Horn's conflict with power forward Kenyon Martin, the Nets traded Van Horn to the Philadelphia 76ers and trusted Jefferson as a starter. Jefferson blossomed in the role, becoming a good mid- and long-range shooter in addition to his slashing ability. On August 13, 2004, Jefferson signed a six-year, $78,000,000 contract extension with the Nets.

Jefferson missed the majority of the 2004–05 regular season after rupturing a ligament in his left wrist, an injury he claimed occurred when Detroit Pistons guard Chauncey Billups purposely undercut him on a layup attempt during a game on December 27, 2004. Jefferson ended up missing 49 games, but returned to action for the first round of the playoffs against the Miami Heat. Prior to suffering the injury, he had missed only five games in his three NBA seasons. Jefferson had been enjoying his best professional season, averaging 22.2 points, 7.3 rebounds, and 4.0 assists per game. Through the 2005–06 season, Jefferson continued to perform at a high level and established himself as one of the NBA's most versatile players. On January 21, 2007, Jefferson decided to have ankle surgery. After missing around six weeks, he was back in the lineup. His absence proved to be a major setback for the struggling Nets, who surged back into playoff contention once Jefferson returned.

In August 2007, Jefferson pledged $3.5 million toward the University of Arizona's then-planned basketball and volleyball practice facility, which was eventually named in his honor.

Jefferson started the 2007–08 season in the best form of his NBA career. In the first 7 games, he averaged 26.9 points, 5.6 rebounds and 2.4 assists, while also notching up 1.3 steals, 97.1% in free-throws and 49.1% in field-goals. On October 31, in a game against the Chicago Bulls, Jefferson injured his right wrist slightly, thumping his chest following a clutch three-pointer. The Nets went on to win the game in overtime. On December 4 he passed Kerry Kittles to become the Nets' second all-time leading scorer.

=== Milwaukee Bucks (2008–2009) ===
On June 26, 2008, Jefferson was traded to the Milwaukee Bucks for Yi Jianlian and future teammate Bobby Simmons. He was unhappy with the trade at first because he planned on being a Net until retirement. However, Jefferson later expressed enthusiasm about playing alongside Michael Redd.

=== San Antonio Spurs (2009–2011) ===
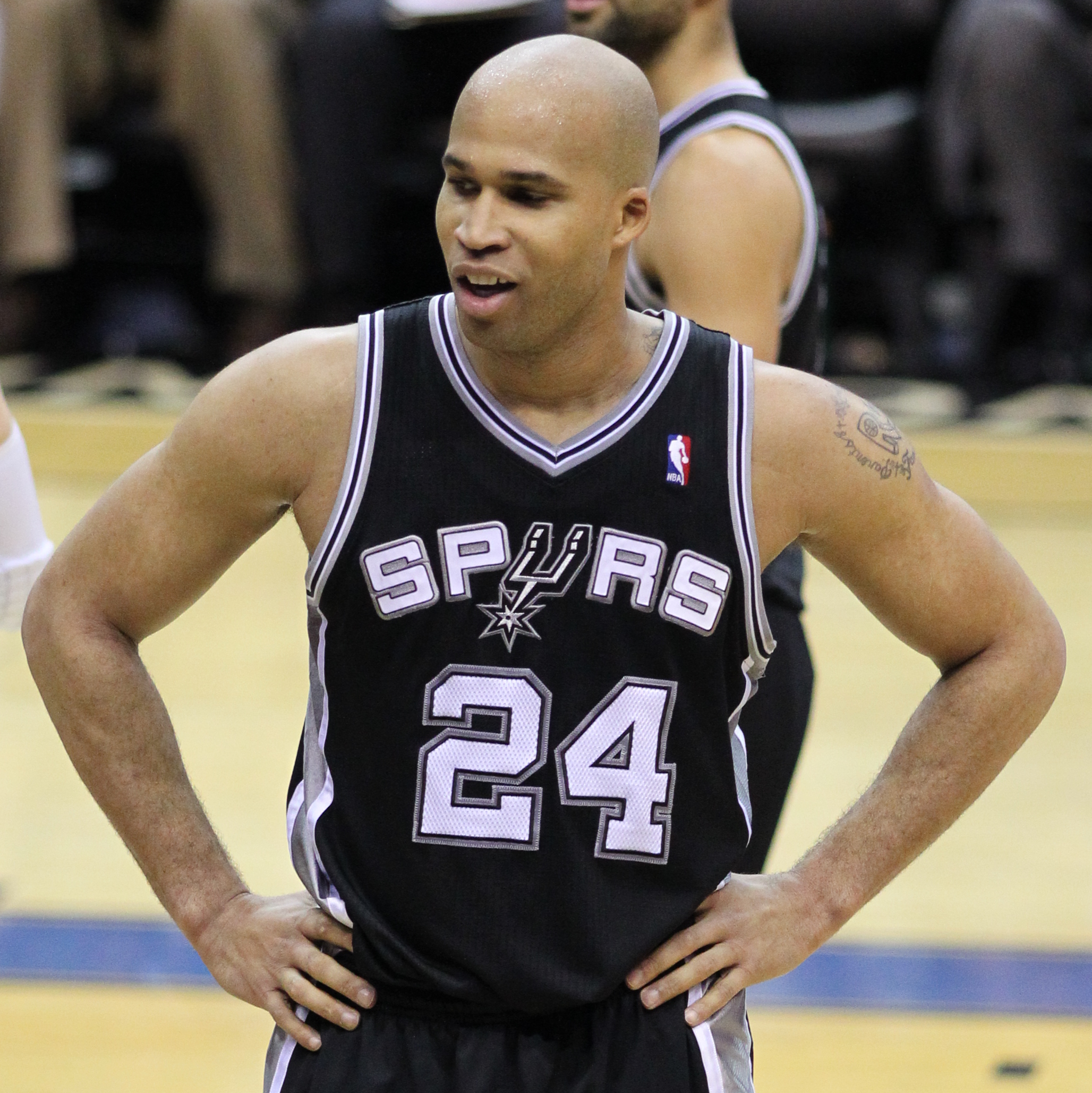
Jefferson in 2011

On June 23, 2009, Richard Jefferson was traded to the San Antonio Spurs for Bruce Bowen, Kurt Thomas, and Fabricio Oberto.

On June 30, 2010, Jefferson opted out of his contract with San Antonio and became an unrestricted free agent. On July 23, Jefferson re-signed with the Spurs.

=== Golden State Warriors (2012–2013) ===
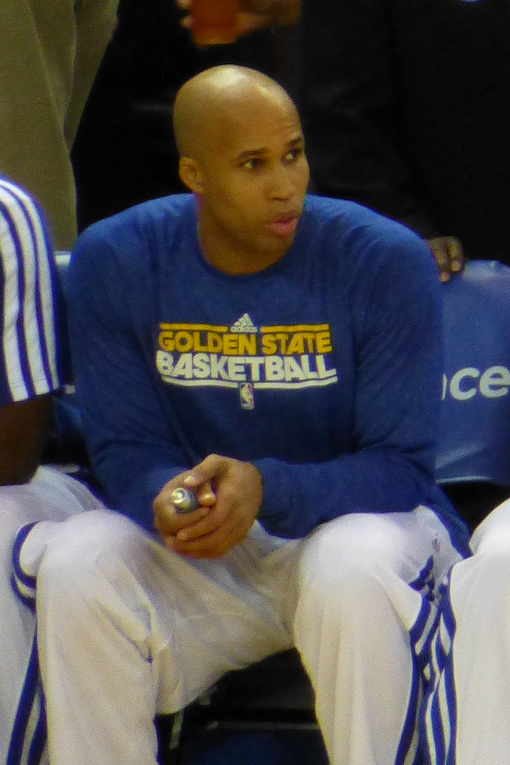
Jefferson in 2013

On March 15, 2012, the Golden State Warriors traded the newly acquired Stephen Jackson for Jefferson, along with a conditional first-round pick.

=== Utah Jazz (2013–2014) ===
On July 5, 2013, the Warriors reportedly agreed to trade Jefferson, along with teammates Brandon Rush and Andris Biedriņš, as well as two first-round picks and two second round picks, to the Utah Jazz in a three team deal, in which they received Andre Iguodala from the Denver Nuggets. The trade became official five days later.

=== Dallas Mavericks (2014–2015) ===
On July 21, 2014, Jefferson signed with the Dallas Mavericks. He was the last Maverick to wear #24 before it was retired in honor of Mark Aguirre.

=== Cleveland Cavaliers (2015–2017) ===
On August 5, 2015, Jefferson signed with the Cleveland Cavaliers. On October 27, he made his Cavaliers debut, recording 10 points, an assist, and a steal in a narrow 97–95 loss to the Chicago Bulls. The Cavaliers finished the regular season with a 57–25 record and reached the 2016 NBA Finals with a 12–2 playoff record. During the third NBA Finals of his career, Jefferson played in every game of the series, including two starts in place of the injured Kevin Love. During Game 3, Jefferson gave the Cavaliers a boost in 33 minutes, posting nine points and eight rebounds as the Cavaliers cut the Golden State Warriors' advantage in the series to 2–1 with a 120–90 victory. Despite falling into a 3–1 deficit, the Cavaliers completed the historic comeback to take the series in seven games, winning Jefferson his first and only championship.

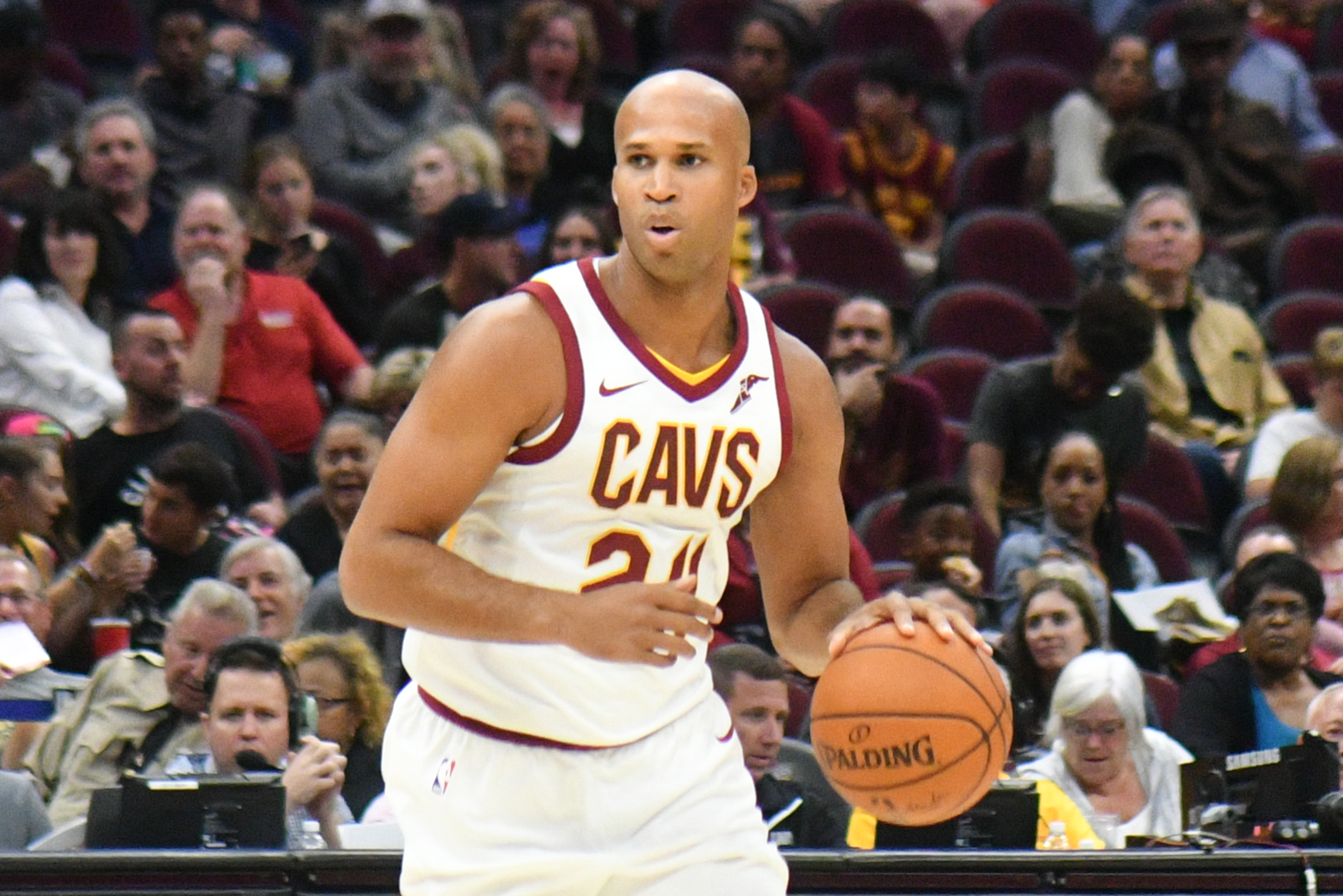
Jefferson in 2017

After initially considering retirement following the championship win, Jefferson re-signed with the Cavaliers on July 28, 2016, reportedly on a two-year, $5 million contract. The Cavaliers returned to the NBA Finals in 2017, but fell short in their quest for back-to-back titles, losing in five games to the Warriors. In his final game with the Cavaliers, Jefferson logged four points and two rebounds in a 129–120 road loss to the Warriors.

On October 14, 2017, Jefferson was traded, along with Kay Felder, two future second-round draft picks and cash considerations, to the Atlanta Hawks in exchange for the rights to Sergiy Gladyr and Dimitrios Agravanis. He was immediately waived by the Hawks.

=== Denver Nuggets (2017–2018) ===
On October 19, 2017, Jefferson signed a one-year, $2.3 million contract with the Denver Nuggets.

=== Retirement ===
On October 13, 2018, Jefferson announced his retirement from professional basketball.

== Broadcasting career ==
Richard Jefferson
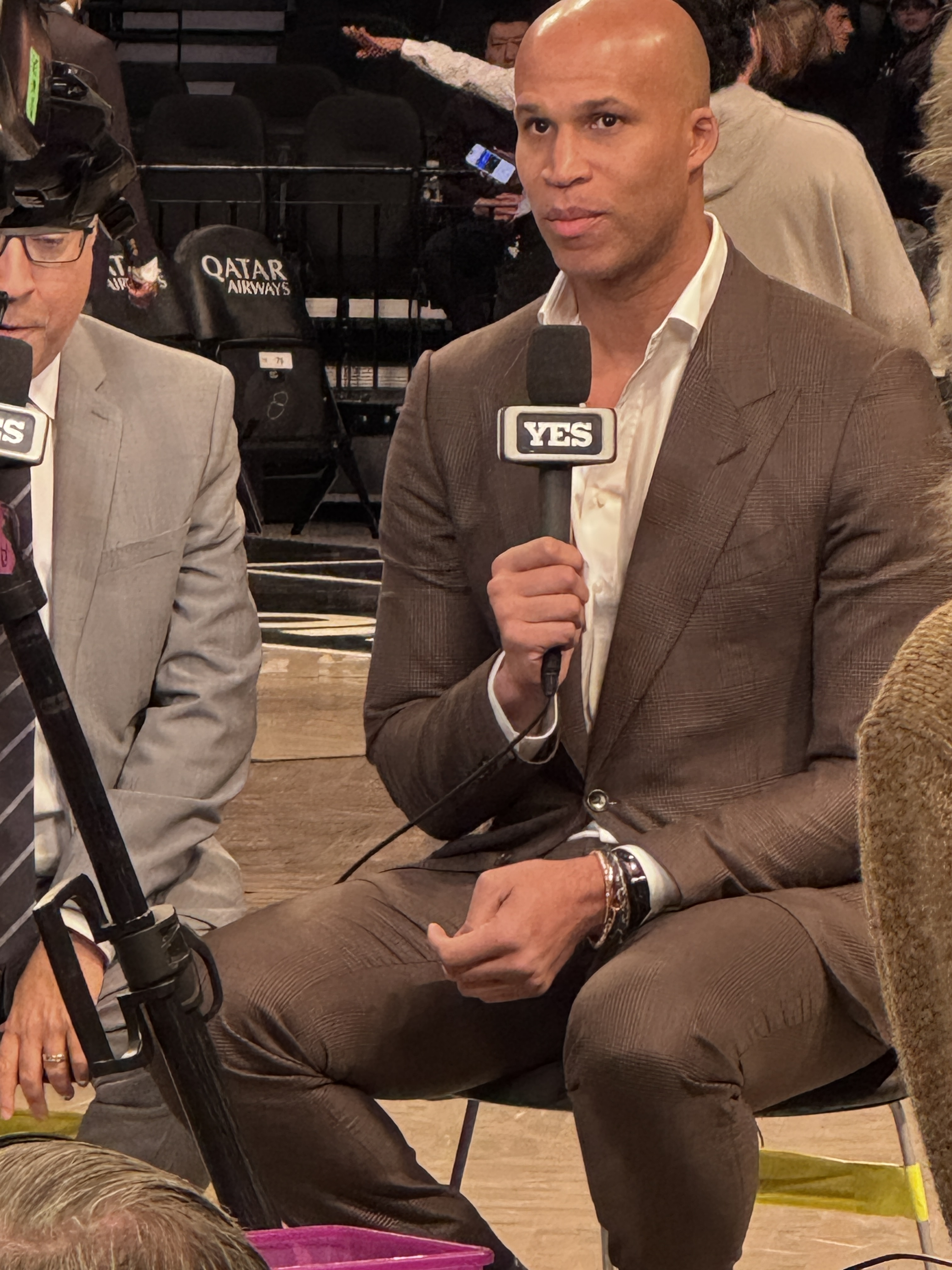
- Jefferson broadcasting from the Barclays Center in 2025
- Years active: 2018–present
- Sports commentary career
- Genre: Color commentary
- Sport: NBA
- Employer: YES Network; ESPN

On October 16, 2018, Jefferson joined the YES Network as the Nets' game and studio analyst. He has also appeared as a basketball analyst on FS1 and the Pac-12 Network. In 2019, Jefferson joined ESPN as an NBA analyst.

During the 2017 season, Jefferson began co-hosting the podcast Road Trippin' alongside former Cavaliers sideline reporter and Lakers host Allie Clifton and teammate and close friend Channing Frye. Many of the podcast's first shows featured Jefferson's Cavs teammates and were recorded while on road trips.

In 2025, ESPN named Jefferson to its lead NBA on ESPN broadcast team along with fellow analyst Tim Legler, play-by-play announcer Mike Breen, and on-court reporter Lisa Salters.

== Personal life ==
Jefferson dated dancer and cheerleader Kesha Ni'cole Nichols for five years. They were engaged to be married on two occasions, but Jefferson broke off the engagement both times. The couple was scheduled to be married on July 11, 2009, at the Mandarin Oriental; however, Jefferson called off the wedding the night before it was scheduled to occur.

On July 11, 2022, the NBA announced that Jefferson would be a referee for the second quarter of the Knicks–Blazers game at the 2022 NBA Summer League.

== NBA career statistics ==
Legend
GP	Games played	GS	Games started	MPG	Minutes per game
FG%	Field goal percentage	3P%	3-point field goal percentage	FT%	Free throw percentage
RPG	Rebounds per game	APG	Assists per game	SPG	Steals per game
BPG	Blocks per game	PPG	Points per game	**Bold**	Career high
†	Won an NBA championship	*	Led the league

=== Regular season ===
Year	Team	GP	GS	MPG	FG%	3P%	FT%	RPG	APG	SPG	BPG	PPG
2001–02	New Jersey	79	9	24.3	.457	.232	.713	3.7	1.8	.8	**.6**	9.4
2002–03	New Jersey	80	80	36.0	**.501**	.250	.743	6.4	2.5	1.0	**.6**	15.5
2003–04	New Jersey	**82**	**82**	38.2	.498	.364	.763	5.7	3.8	**1.1**	.3	18.5
2004–05	New Jersey	33	33	**41.1**	.422	.337	**.844**	**7.3**	**4.0**	1.0	.5	22.2
2005–06	New Jersey	78	78	39.2	.493	.319	.812	6.8	3.8	.8	.2	19.5
2006–07	New Jersey	55	53	35.6	.456	.359	.733	4.4	2.7	.6	.1	16.3
2007–08	New Jersey	**82***	**82***	39.0	.466	.362	.798	4.2	3.1	.9	.3	**22.6**
2008–09	Milwaukee	**82***	**82***	35.8	.439	.397	.805	4.6	2.4	.8	.2	19.6
2009–10	San Antonio	81	70	31.1	.467	.316	.735	4.4	2.0	.6	.5	12.3
2010–11	San Antonio	81	81	30.4	.474	**.440**	.750	3.8	1.3	.5	.4	11.0
2011–12	San Antonio	41	41	28.5	.414	.421	.700	3.5	1.3	.6	.3	9.2
2011–12	Golden State	22	3	26.4	.420	.418	.686	3.5	1.5	.5	.3	9.0
2012–13	Golden State	56	1	10.1	.456	.311	.717	1.5	.6	.3	.1	3.1
2013–14	Utah	**82**	78	27.0	.450	.409	.741	2.7	1.6	.7	.2	10.1
2014–15	Dallas	74	18	16.8	.444	.426	.684	2.5	.8	.4	.1	5.8
2015–16†	Cleveland	74	5	17.9	.458	.382	.667	1.7	.8	.4	.2	5.5
2016–17	Cleveland	79	13	20.4	.446	.333	.741	2.6	1.0	.3	.1	5.7
2017–18	Denver	20	0	8.2	.444	.286	.571	.9	.8	.1	.1	1.5
Career		1181	809	29.0	.464	.376	.768	4.0	2.0	.7	.3	12.6

=== Playoffs ===
Year	Team	GP	GS	MPG	FG%	3P%	FT%	RPG	APG	SPG	BPG	PPG
2002	New Jersey	20	0	22.1	.465	.000	.550	4.6	1.3	.6	.5	7.0
2003	New Jersey	20	**20**	35.6	.476	.000	.718	**6.4**	2.4	.8	.2	14.1
2004	New Jersey	11	11	**41.8**	.418	.273	.713	6.3	3.8	**1.3**	**.7**	19.8
2005	New Jersey	4	1	35.0	.400	.200	.677	5.5	2.3	.8	.0	15.8
2006	New Jersey	11	11	39.7	**.545**	.414	.825	4.1	**4.1**	.9	.4	**22.2**
2007	New Jersey	12	12	40.8	.482	.325	.924	5.6	2.3	.8	.4	19.7
2010	San Antonio	10	10	33.4	.486	.200	.758	5.3	1.8	.6	.6	9.4
2011	San Antonio	6	6	29.3	.387	.353	.818	4.2	.8	.5	.5	6.5
2013	Golden State	7	0	5.6	.444	**.667**	.333	1.0	.1	.1	.1	1.9
2015	Dallas	4	2	12.8	.357	.375	**1.000**	.5	.3	.5	.0	3.8
2016†	Cleveland	**21**	2	18.1	.524	.393	.750	3.5	.7	.5	.0	5.4
2017	Cleveland	14	0	12.8	.421	.263	.643	1.8	.5	.1	.2	3.9
Career		140	75	27.4	.473	.325	.731	4.3	1.7	.6	.3	10.8
