= Sports on Amazon Prime Video =

Branding for sports broadcast on Amazon Prime Video

Amazon first acquired sports rights in April 2017, when they signed a $50 million deal for the non-exclusive rights to stream portions of the NFL's Thursday Night Football games during the 2017 NFL season to Prime and Prime Video subscribers, replacing a previous deal with Twitter. Since then Amazon has acquired exclusive sports rights in 10 countries, including Australia, Canada, Brazil, France, Germany, Italy and the United Kingdom. Premier rights include the Copa do Brasil in Brazil, Ligue 1 and the French Open in France, the UEFA Champions League in the United Kingdom, Germany and Italy, the Premier League in the United Kingdom, the NHL's Wednesday Night Hockey in Canada, and Thursday Night Football in the United States.

In December 2022, Amazon launched Sports Talk in the United States; a free ad-supported streaming television sports talk channel produced in partnership with Embassy Row. The channel was shut down in October 2023.

== Channels ==
Prime Video also offers several "channels" for live sports. These channels are separate, non Amazon subscription services, which add a cost on top of Amazon Prime, but, when purchased, can be accessed through Amazon Prime.

In the United States the channels include, MLB Network (the channel add on not MLB.TV), NBA League Pass (which includes NBA TV), Paramount+ (which includes select sporting events from CBS Sports), Motortrend, MOTV, FuelTV, Max (which includes all sporting events from TNT Sports), Apple TV+, Fox One (which includes all sporting events from Fox Sports), Peacock (which includes most sporting events from NBC Sports), The Surf Network, Willow TV (which includes content from Willow Sports), Tennis Channel, DAZN, Vix (which includes content from Univision Sports) and BeIN Sports .

In the United Kingdom the channels include, Premier Sports, Discovery+ Sport, and La Liga TV.

In France the channels include, Golf Channel and Le Pass Ligue 1.

In Brazil the channels include NBA, Canais Globo (which includes SporTV), Premiere (Brasileirão), Combate, Paramount+ (Copa Libertadores and Copa Sudamericana events) and CazéTV.

== Current rights ==
=== Global ===
- Women's National Basketball Association (2021–present)
  - 30 exclusive national regular season games (20 from 2021-2025)
  - WNBA Commissioner's Cup final
  - First round of WNBA playoffs (begins 2026)
  - 7 WNBA Semifinals (begins 2026)
  - 3 WNBA Finals (2028, 2032, and 2036)
- National Basketball Association (2025–present, [2026–present for Canada])
  - 66 regular season games (86 in Canada, Mexico, Brazil, France, Italy, Spain, Germany, the United Kingdom and Ireland)
  - NBA Cup knockout rounds (including semifinals and finals)
  - All NBA Play-In Tournament games
  - Select first and second-round NBA playoffs games.
  - 6 NBA Conference Finals (11 in Canada, Mexico, Brazil, France, Italy, Spain, Germany, the United Kingdom and Ireland)
  - NBA Finals for international countries (6 in Mexico, Brazil, France, Italy, Spain, Germany, the United Kingdom and Ireland)
  - Exclusive coverage of Half of all Las Vegas NBA Summer League games (including the Semifinals of Las Vegas Summer league) and Simulcasts of all other Summer league games.
- NBA G League (2025–present)
  - select regular season and postseason games
- Professional Pickleball Association
  - 4 live events per year
  - PPA World Championship Series
- UTR Pro Tennis Tour
- Men's college basketball (2026–present)
  - Three neutral site basketball games per season featuring Duke

=== Australia ===
- Men's and women's International Cricket Council tournaments (2024–2027)
- Major League Cricket (2024–present)

=== Austria ===
- Exclusive rights to Wimbledon Championships tennis tournament (2024–2027)

=== Brazil ===
- Copa do Brasil (2022–2026)
  - Sub-licensed from Grupo Globo
  - Circa 50 matches per season
  - Exclusive matches from 1st round until quarter-finals
  - Semi-finals and final shown, but also shared with SporTV and TV Globo
- CazéTV content Simulcasts
- Campeonato Brasileiro Série A (2025–2028)
  - Liga Forte Futebol do Brasil Teams´s home matches only
  - 1 Exclusive match by fixture.

=== Canada ===
- All Elite Wrestling (2025–present)
  - Pay-per-view events available to purchase via the Prime Video platform.
- ONE Championship
  - ONE on Prime Video mixed martial arts and muay Thai events (2022–present)
- National Hockey League (2024–2039)
  - 26 regular season games
  - Two first round playoff series, one second round series
  - Sub-licensed from Rogers
  - NHL Coast To Coast, weekly whiparound studio show on Thursday nights
- Professional Women's Hockey League (2024–present)
  - All games on Tuesday nights
  - One semifinal

=== France ===
- French Open (2021–27)
  - 11 "night sessions" matches
  - All Court Simonne-Mathieu matches

=== Germany ===
- UEFA Champions League (2021–2027)
  - Tuesday evening matches up to the semifinals
- Exclusive rights to Wimbledon Championships tennis tournament (2024–2027)

=== India ===
- New Zealand Cricket

=== Italy ===
- UEFA Champions League (2021-2027)
  - 18 Wednesday evening matches up to the semifinals

=== Japan ===
- Prime Video Presents Live Boxing
- Major League Baseball Regular Season
  - Includes MLB Tokyo Series games
  - Rights sub-licensed from SPOTV Japan
- Samurai Japan Baseball
  - Rights Shared with Japan Consortium

=== Mexico ===
- National Basketball Association
  - 50 games per year
- Liga MX (2024–2027)
  - Chivas de Guadalajara home matches

=== The Netherlands ===
- English Premier League (2025–2028)
  - One match per matchday, up to 38 per season
  - Games will begin at 13:30 (Dutch time)

=== Sweden and Denmark ===
- Premier League (2024–2028)
  - 38 matches per season

=== United Kingdom ===
- All Elite Wrestling (2025–present)
  - Pay-per-view events available to purchase via the Prime Video platform.
- UEFA Champions League (2024–2027)
  - One match a week, 20 matches a season
- Ligue 1 (2025–present)
  - Up to three matches per week
  - Each match only available pay-per-view
  - Prime subscription not needed
- UEFA Nations League (2025–2026)
  - Select matches
  - Each match only available pay-per-view
  - Prime subscription not needed
- European Qualifiers to the FIFA World Cup 2026 (2025–2026)
  - Select matches
  - Each match only available pay-per-view
  - Prime subscription not needed
- UEFA International Friendly matches (2025–2026)
  - Select matches
  - Each match only available pay-per-view
  - Prime subscription not needed
- Bundesliga (2025–present)
  - Two Sunday afternoon matches every match week
  - 15 extra Sunday matches
  - One mid-week match
  - One match during final day
  - Four matches from Bundesliga and Bundesliga 2 Relegation Play Offs
  - Each match only available pay-per-view
  - Prime subscription not needed

=== United States ===
- All Elite Wrestling (2025–present)
  - Pay-per-view events available to purchase via the Prime Video platform.
- National Football League (exclusive since 2022)
  - Thursday Night Football (2017–present)
  - Black Friday Football (2023–present)
  - 1 NFL Wild Card round game (2021–2022, 2025–present)
  - 1 preseason game (2022–present)
- Major League Baseball
  - Select New York Yankees games in home market only (2021–present)
- National Women's Soccer League (2024–present)
  - 27 Friday night matches
  - 1 quarterfinal per season
- National Hockey League
  - All non-nationally televised Seattle Kraken (2024–present), along with Anaheim Ducks and Dallas Stars (2026–present) games, in home market only.
  - Direct-to-consumer rights for all non-nationally televised Carolina Hurricanes, Columbus Blue Jackets, Minnesota Wild, and St. Louis Blues games within home markets via add-on (2026–present)
- ONE Championship
  - ONE on Prime Video mixed martial arts and Muay Thai events (2022–present)
- Overtime Elite
  - 20 games
- NASCAR Cup Series (2025–present)
  - 5 races
  - Practice and qualifying sessions for the first half of the season
- Premier Boxing Champions (2024–present)
  - Distribute pay-per-view events (Amazon Prime subscription not required)
  - Exclusively air PBC Championship Boxing events
- Women's National Basketball Association (2022–present)
  - Seattle Storm regular season games (regional broadcasts in Washington state only)
- Masters Tournament (2026–present)
  - Two hours of early-afternoon coverage during the first and second rounds, preceding ESPN television coverage.

== Former rights ==
- Australian Swimming Championships (Global rights) (2021–2022)
- National Football League (Global rights)
  - One exclusive Saturday game (2020)
  - Thursday Night Football (2017–2021)
  - One NFL Wild Card round game (2021–2022)
- Association of Volleyball Professionals (Global rights) (2018–2020)
- 2023 World Baseball Classic (Japan)
- Copa America (2024) (Japan)
  - 14 Matches live, rest of matches VOD
- Premier League (United Kingdom)
  - 20 matches (2019–2025)
- US Open (United Kingdom) (2018–2022)
- Ligue 1 (2021–24, France)
  - 8 matches per week
  - 10 top pick matches and 66 second and third pick matches per season
  - Sunday highlight show
- Next Generation ATP Finals (United Kingdom) (2018–2023)
- ATP World Tour (United Kingdom)
  - Third party pay TV provider for Queens Club and Eastbourne tournament (2018–2023)
  - All Masters 1000 events (2019–2023)
  - Twelve 500 and 250 series tournaments (2019–2023)
  - Third party pay TV provider for the ATP finals (2019–2023)
- WTA Tour (United Kingdom)
  - 49 tournaments (2020–2023)
- Seattle Sounders FC (United States) (2020–2022)

== Sports Talk ==
Sports Talk
- Country: United States
- Network: Sports on Amazon Prime Video

Programming
- Language: English
- Picture format: 720p (HD, variable due to user bandwidth)

Ownership
- Owner: Amazon
- Parent: Amazon Prime Video; Embassy Row

History
- Launched: December 1, 2022
- Closed: September 30, 2023

Sports Talk was a free ad-supported streaming television sports talk channel produced in partnership with Embassy Row offered on Amazon Prime and Amazon Freevee. Launched in December 2022, live programming was aired from 8 a.m. to 8 p.m. eastern time each weekday. Shows on the channel included Bonjour Sports Talk, The Cari Champion Show, Game Breakers, From the Desk Of Master T, The Power Hour, The Greatest Hour of All Time, and The Backup Plan. Notable on-air talent included Ben Lyons, Cari Champion and Rennae Stubbs. The channel shutdown in October 2023.
