= Cassidy Hubbarth =

American sports anchor (born 1984)

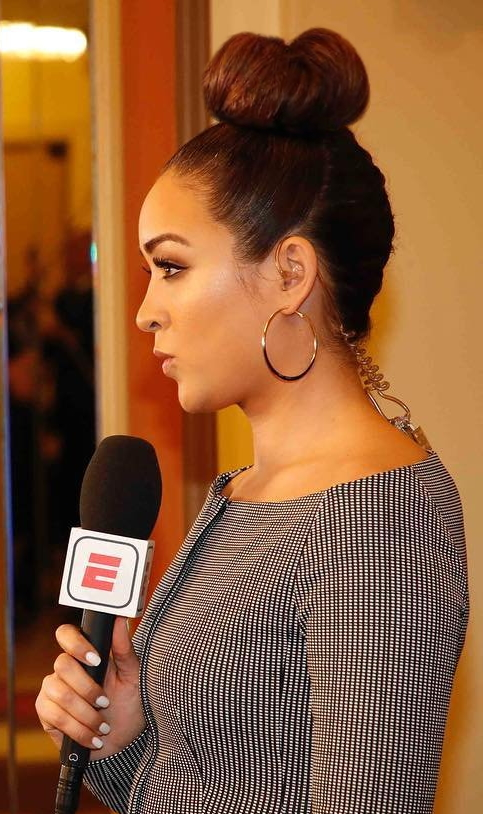
- Hubbarth in May 2018
- Born: September 19, 1984 (age 42); Evanston, Illinois, U.S.
- Education: Northwestern University
- Occupations: ESPN anchor and host
- Years active: 2007–present
- Website: espnpressroom.com/us/bios/hubbarth_cassidy/

Cassidy Hubbarth (born September 19, 1984) is an American television anchor. Hubbarth formerly hosted ESPN2's NBA Tonight and also anchored ESPN's SportsCenter and College Football Live.

== Early life ==
Hubbarth was born in the Chicago area to Emmeline and Gerry Hubbarth. Hubbarth is of Filipino descent from her mother Emmeline's side and of German and Irish descent from her father Gerry's side. Hubbarth is a native of Evanston, Illinois. She graduated from Evanston Township High School in 2003, where she was a three-sport athlete for four years. Hubbarth was a part of the 2002 ETHS State Championship high school soccer team. She attended the University of Illinois Urbana-Champaign for one year before receiving her Bachelor of Science degree from the Medill School of Journalism at Northwestern University.

== Career ==
Hubbarth was a host and reporter for the Big Ten Network and Fox Sports South, prior to working for ESPN. She won a Southeast Emmy for Interactivity for her work on SEC Gridiron Live. She worked for Navteq, after graduation, as a traffic reporter and producer for WMAQ NBC5 Network in Chicago. She also worked at Intersport as a production assistant, associate producer and host.

Hubbarth joined ESPN in August 2010 as a studio anchor and host for college football, college basketball and the NBA on ESPN3. She also hosted other exclusive ESPN3 broadcasts such as the Georgia Pro Day, the Baylor Pro Day and the Madden Bowl. Hubbarth became a full-time anchor for ESPN in March 2013. She has hosted various shows for the ESPN Networks, including: SportsCenter, NBA Tonight, the NBA Today podcast, Highlight Express, Numbers Never Lie, SportsNation, First Take, and others. In April 2025, Hubbarth left ESPN to join NBA on Prime Video.

== Personal life ==
Cassidy is the youngest of three children. She is also a die-hard Chicago Bulls fan. She gave birth to a girl in December 2018.
