= Allie Clifton =

American sports journalist (born 1988)

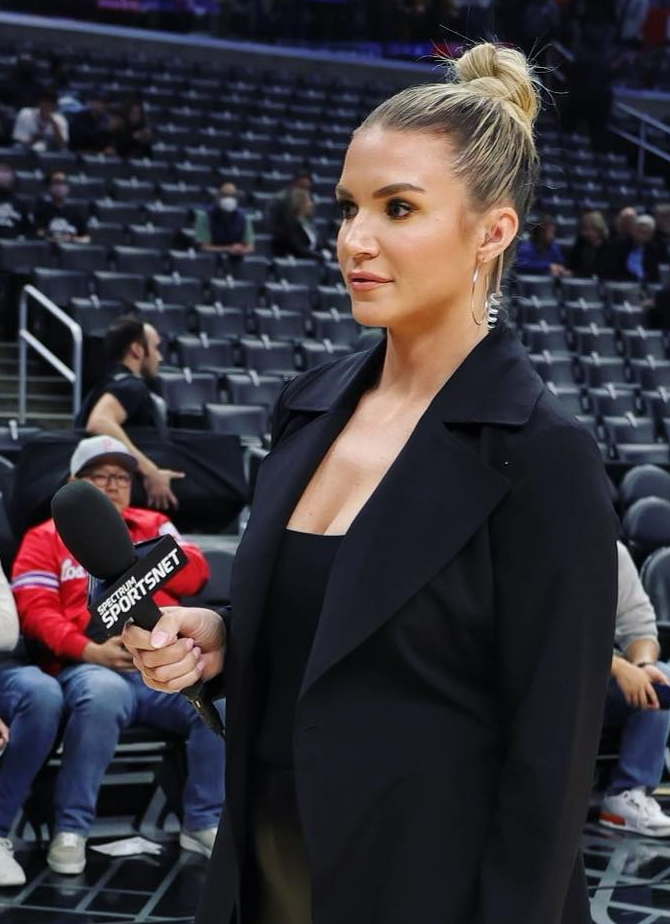
Clifton in 2022

Allyson Bethany Clifton (born January 30, 1988) is an American sports journalist and former college basketball player. She is the television pregame host for Los Angeles Lakers telecasts on Spectrum SportsNet and previously served as Cleveland Cavaliers sideline reporter for Fox Sports Ohio. Additionally, she is a co-host on Road Trippin' podcast.

== Biography ==
Clifton was born January 30, 1988. A native of Van Wert, Ohio, Clifton played college basketball for the Toledo Rockets women's basketball team from 2006 to 2010. After college, Clifton began her broadcasting career in Toledo as a sports reporter for ABC affiliate WTVG channel 13 before joining the Cavaliers broadcast team in 2012.

In 2017, Clifton began co-hosting the podcast Road Trippin' alongside Cavs players Richard Jefferson and Channing Frye. Many of the podcast's first shows featured Cavs players and were recorded while the team was on road trips.

In summer 2018, Clifton announced she was leaving Fox Sports Ohio and the Cavaliers to take a job hosting the pregame show on Spectrum SportsNet for Los Angeles Lakers telecasts, coinciding with LeBron James leaving the Cavaliers to sign with the Lakers.

On February 14, 2024, Clifton became the first woman to call a Lakers game, which she did on Spectrum SportsNet with play-by-play announcer Bill Macdonald.

== Awards and honors ==
In 2018, Clifton won a pair of Lower Great Lakes Emmy Awards as a member of the Cavaliers broadcast team.

== College statistics ==
Legend
GP	Games played	GS	Games started	MPG	Minutes per game
FG%	Field goal percentage	3P%	3-point field goal percentage	FT%	Free throw percentage
RPG	Rebounds per game	APG	Assists per game	SPG	Steals per game
BPG	Blocks per game	PPG	Points per game	**Bold**	Career high

Year	Team	GP	GS	MPG	FG%	3P%	FT%	RPG	APG	SPG	BPG	PPG
2006–07	Toledo	24	–	18.8	.376	.269	.636	3.7	1.2	.8	.0	4.6
2007–08	Toledo	22	–	**27.2**	**.542**	**.405**	**.697**	**6.1**	1.8	1.0	.0	**13.7**
2008–09	Toledo	26	–	25.1	.467	.342	.689	5.7	**2.3**	1.0	**.1**	9.5
2009–10	Toledo	**29**	**27**	19.5	.469	.273	.633	4.1	1.2	**1.1**	.0	5.7
**Career**		101	27	22.5	.477	.327	.676	4.9	1.6	1.0	.0	8.2
Statistics gathered from Sports-Reference.
