= Michael Grady (sports announcer) =

American sports broadcaster (born 1983)

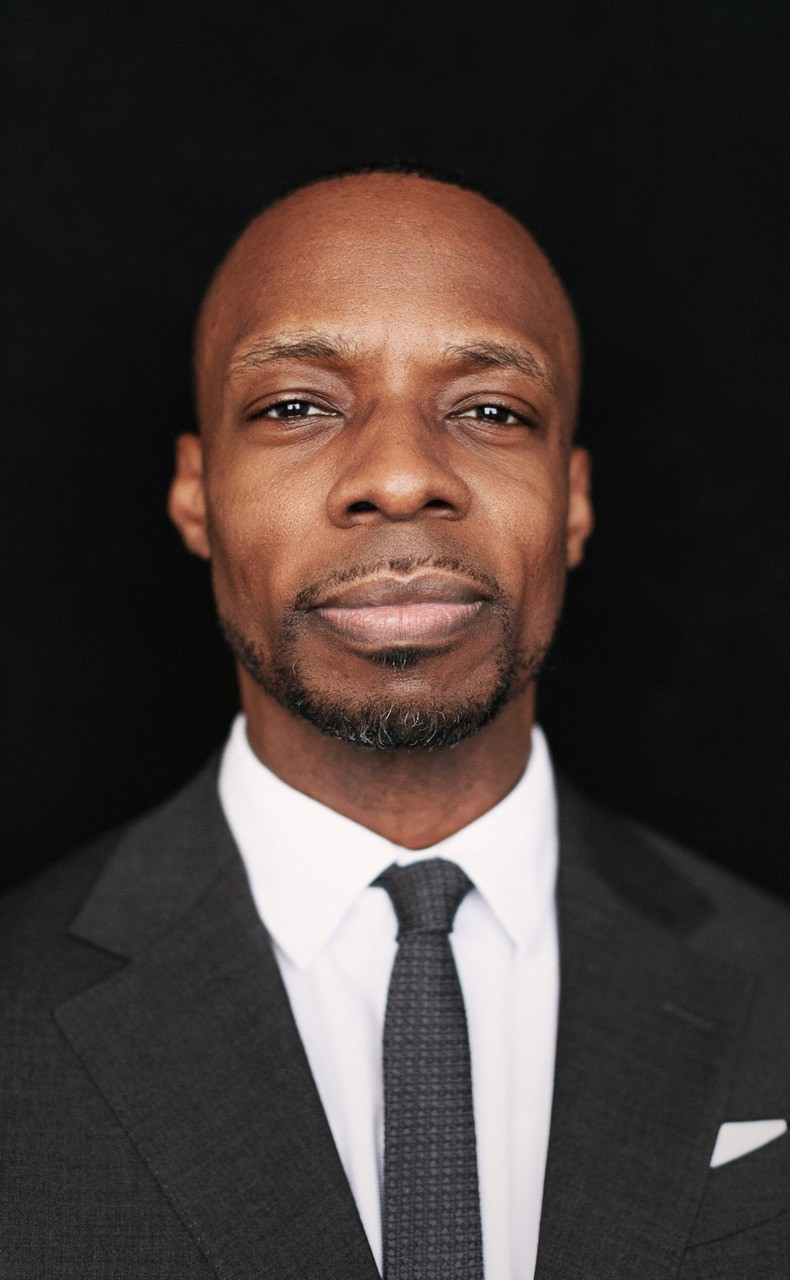
- Born: April 23, 1983 (age 43); Fort Riley, Kansas, U.S.
- Occupations: Sports announcer; commentator
- Years active: 2003–present
- Employer: NBC Sports

Michael Grady (born April 23, 1983) is an American television sportscaster. He serves as a play-by-play sports announcer for the National Basketball Association (NBA) and the Women's National Basketball Association (WNBA) coverage on NBC Sports and Amazon Prime Video. He is also known for his work as the television play-by-play announcer for the Minnesota Timberwolves.

== Early life and education ==
Michael Grady was born in Fort Riley, Kansas, and was raised in Indianapolis, Indiana, by his mother, Mavis, alongside his sister, Nichol. He developed an early interest in sports and broadcasting, influenced in part by sportscasters Ahmad Rashad and Bob Costas. As a junior at Warren Central High School, Grady began calling football and basketball games for the school's radio station, WEDM.

He later attended Vincennes University, where he studied broadcasting. During his time there, he anchored news and sportscasts for WVUT and earned a marketing certification from the Radio Advertising Bureau.

== Career ==
=== Early career ===
Michael Grady began his broadcasting career in 2003, as a board operator at 1070 WIBC (now WFNI) in Indianapolis. He later became a producer for Indiana Sports Talk, a radio program hosted by Bob Lovell.

In 2007, Grady was promoted to executive producer at WFNI 1070 The Fan, an ESPN Radio affiliate in Indianapolis.

=== Indiana Pacers (2010–2017) and WRTV ===
While working for WFNI, Grady became the public-address announcer for the Indiana Pacers, a team he had supported growing up. He served as an in-arena emcee from 2008 to 2010 and as the team's public address announcer from 2010 to 2017.

In 2011, he was promoted to midday co-host of the Grady and Big Joe Show alongside Joe Staysniak. The radio show was aired on WFNI 107.5 ESPN's 1070 The Fan, a position he held until 2018.

In 2014, Grady was hired by WRTV, Indianapolis’ ABC affiliate, initially on a temporary basis to cover the Pacers’ playoff run. Following the team's appearance in the Eastern Conference Finals, he was hired as a full-time sports anchor. That same year, he was named to the Indianapolis Business Journal's Forty Under 40 list.

Grady balanced his roles in radio and television before being named Indiana Sportscaster of the Year in 2016. That year, he also received a Regional Emmy Award as part of WRTV’s coverage of the 2016 Indianapolis 500.

=== Brooklyn Nets (2017–2022) ===
In 2017, Michael Grady relocated to Brooklyn to join the YES Network. During his tenure, he served as a sideline reporter for the Brooklyn Nets, a play-by-play announcer for the WNBA's New York Liberty, and select Nets games, studio host for New York Yankees coverage, and host of his own digital show Appreciate You.

=== Minnesota Timberwolves (2022–present) ===
In 2022, Grady joined the Minnesota Timberwolves as the team's television play-by-play announcer on Bally Sports North (later FanDuel Sports Network). During his tenure, he gained recognition for his on-air catchphrase "Cash!" being used when the team made clutch shots.

Grady received Regional Emmy Awards for Sports Play-by-Play in 2023 and 2024. In 2025, he was named Minnesota Sportscaster of the Year by the National Sports Media Association.

=== Prime Video and NBC Sports ===
Grady was hired as a national play-by-play announcer for NBA and WNBA coverage on Amazon Prime Video and NBC Sports for the 2025–2026 season.

=== Other announcing ===
In addition to his primary roles, Grady has called NBA games for ESPN, TNT, and NBATV. He has also worked as a sideline reporter for National Football League (NFL) coverage and as a play-by-play announcer for college football and basketball broadcasts on CBS Sports.

== Personal life ==
Grady lives in Brooklyn, New York.

== Awards ==
- Forty under 40, Indianapolis Business Journal 2014.
- Indiana Sportscaster of the Year, Indiana Sportswriters and Sportscasters Association 2016.
- Lower Great Lakes Chapter Emmy Award, Indy 500 Coverage, Reporter 2016.
- New York Emmy Award, Brooklyn Nets Basketball, Reporter 2017–2018.
- New York Emmy Award, Short Form Sports Story, Talent 2019–2020.
- New York Emmy Award, Brooklyn Nets Magazine, Host 2019–2020.
- New York Emmy Award, Yankees Batting Practice Today, Talent 2019–2020.
- Upper Midwest Regional Emmy Award, Sports Play by Play 2023.
- Upper Midwest Regional Emmy Award, Sports Play by Play 2024.
- Minnesota Sportscaster of the Year, National Sports Media Association 2025.
