= Mike Longabardi =

American basketball player and coach (born 1973)

Philadelphia 76ers
- Position: Assistant coach
- League: NBA

Personal information
- Born: February 23, 1973 (age 53) New York City, New York, U.S.

Career information
- High school: Xaverian (Brooklyn)
- College: Newberry (1991–1993); Frostburg State (1994–1996)
- Coaching career: 1996–present

Career history

Coaching
- 1996–1997: Pfeiffer (assistant)
- 1997–1999: Adelphi (assistant)
- 1999: Adelphi (interim)
- 1999–2002: Lafayette (assistant)
- 2002–2003: Towson (assistant)
- 2003–2007: Houston Rockets (assistant)
- 2007–2013: Boston Celtics (assistant)
- 2013–2015: Phoenix Suns (assistant)
- 2016–2019: Cleveland Cavaliers (assistant/assoc. HC)
- 2019–2021: Washington Wizards (assistant)
- 2021–2022: Sacramento Kings (assistant)
- 2022–2023: Atlanta Hawks (assistant)
- 2023–present: Philadelphia 76ers (assistant)
- 2023–2025: →Delaware Blue Coats

Career highlights
- As assistant coach: 2× NBA champion (2008, 2016)

Michael Longabardi (born February 23, 1973) is an American basketball assistant coach for the Philadelphia 76ers of the National Basketball Association (NBA). He was previously an assistant coach for the Houston Rockets, Boston Celtics, Cleveland Cavaliers, Washington Wizards, Sacramento Kings and Atlanta Hawks, winning an NBA Finals championship with both the Celtics and Cavaliers.

== Early life and college career ==
Longabardi was born and raised in Brooklyn, New York, and attended Xaverian High School, a private Catholic school. He went on to play basketball at Newberry College where he earned the nickname "Mr. Defense." After two years at Newberry College, Longabardi transferred to Frostburg State University. He graduated from Frostburg State with a bachelor's degree in Health and Physical Education.

== College coaching career ==
Longabardi began his career as an assistant head coach for Pfeiffer University. After one season at Pfeiffer, Longabardi took a position as assistant coach at Adelphi University. Adelphi made two consecutive NCAA Division II Men's Basketball Championship appearances in 1998 and 1999.

In 2000, he took a job as an assistant coach at Lafayette College, where he helped guide the team to a Patriot League Title and an NCAA Tournament appearance. In 2002, he became an assistant coach at Towson University.

== NBA coaching career ==
=== Houston Rockets ===
During the summer of 2001, Longabardi helped coach the NACEL Open Door College All-Star Team with Bill Van Gundy, the father of both Stan Van Gundy and Jeff Van Gundy. When Jeff Van Gundy was hired as the new head coach of the Houston Rockets in 2003, he hired Longabardi to join the staff.

In his first year in Houston, he was as the assistant video coordinator and one year later he was promoted to lead video coordinator.

=== Boston Celtics ===
In 2007, Longabardi was hired by the Boston Celtics as an assistant coach. He worked under Doc Rivers and Tom Thibodeau. In his first season with the Celtics, the team went on to win the NBA Championship, defeating the Los Angeles Lakers 4–2.

In 2009, Longabardi became the Celtics full-time defensive coordinator.

=== Phoenix Suns ===
On June 25, 2013, Longabardi became an assistant coach for the Phoenix Suns under head coach Jeff Hornacek. In Longabardi's first year, the Suns had a record of 48–34, which was a drastic improvement from the previous year (25–57).

=== Cleveland Cavaliers ===
In 2016, Longabardi was hired by the Cleveland Cavaliers to be their defensive coordinator under head coach Tyronn Lue. In his first year with the team, the Cavaliers won the NBA Championship.

=== Washington Wizards ===
On August 1, 2019, Longabardi was hired as an assistant coach by the Washington Wizards under head coach Scott Brooks.

=== Sacramento Kings ===
On August 16, 2021, Longabardi was hired by the Sacramento Kings as an assistant coach.

=== Atlanta Hawks ===
On July 8, 2022, Longabardi was hired by the Atlanta Hawks as an assistant coach.

=== Philadelphia 76ers / Delaware Blue Coats ===
On September 5, 2023, Longabardi became an assistant coach for the Philadelphia 76ers and the head coach of the Delaware Blue Coats.
