= Brockport High School =

Location
- 40 Allen Street, #700; Brockport, New York; USA; 43.2047°N 77.9545°W

Information
- Type: Public
- School district: Brockport Central School District
- Principal: Michael Pincelli
- Grades: 9-12
- Enrollment: 920 (2025-26)
- Color: Blue White
- Mascot: Blue Devil
- Rival: Spencerport High School, Hilton High School
- Yearbook: Arista
- Website: Brockport High School

Brockport High School is a High School located in Sweden, New York on the west side of Monroe County, USA. The current principal is Michael Pincelli. The previous local high school was the Brockport Central Rural High School in Brockport, New York, currently the A.D. Oliver Middle School, listed on the National Register of Historic Places in 2011. The Brockport Blue Devils won the 2003 NYSPHSAA Hockey Championship.

== Notable alumni ==
- Jim Cosman, American professional baseball player
- Christopher John Farley, editor for The Wall Street Journal
- Martin Ferrero, Actor
- Carolyn Mackler, Author
- Carl Muesebeck, American entomologist who specialized in the Hymenoptera.
- Andy Parrino, American professional baseball player
- Thomas Sydeski, college football coach
- Jeff Van Gundy, NBA Coach and broadcaster

== See also ==
- Brockport, New York
- Brockport Central School District
