= Brockport Central School District =

School district in New York, United States

Address
- 40 Allen Street Brockport, New York, 14420; United States

District information
- Type: Public
- Grades: PK–12
- Schools: 5
- NCES District ID: 3605580

Students and staff
- Students: 3,341 (2025–2026)
- Teachers: 283.60 (on an FTE basis) (2025–2026)
- Staff: 305.30 (on an FTE basis) (2025–2026)
- Student–teacher ratio: 11.78 (2025–2026)

Other information
- Website: www.bcs1.org

The Brockport Central School District is a public school district in New York State that, as of the 2025–26 school year, serves 3,227 students in grades pre-kindergarten through twelve in the village of Brockport and portions of the towns of Clarkson, Hamlin, Ogden, Parma and Sweden in Monroe County, a small portion of the town of Clarendon in Orleans County, and a small portion of the town of Bergen in Genesee County, with over 800 employees and an operating budget of $62 million (~$14,351 per student).

Class sizes average between 19 and 26 students and the student-teacher ratio is 15:1 (elementary), 13:1 (middle-high school).

The district is one of the oldest centralized districts in New York State.

== Administrators ==
- Sean Bruno - Superintendent of Schools
- Jerilee Gulino - Assistant Superintendent for Human Resources
- Nicole Morasco - Assistant Superintendent for Business
- Lynn Carragher - Assistant Superintendent for Inclusive Education and Instruction
- Anthony Smith - Assistant Superintendent for Instruction
- Jill Reichhart - Director of Finance/Treasurer

== Board of education ==
The Board of Education has seven members, who serve rotating five-year terms, and a student member. Each May, school district voters go to the polls to vote for board members and the school district budget.

Current board members

- Robert Lewis - President (Term ends: 2028)
- David Howlett - Vice President (Term ends: 2030)
- Jeffrey Harradine (Term ends: 2027)
- Matthew Hennard (Term ends: 2031)
- Kevin Parmele (Term ends: 2029)
- David Stroup (Term ends: 2029)
- Michael Turbeville (Term ends: 2028)
- Jessica Maher - Student member (Term ends: June 25, 2027)

== Schools ==
The district operates five schools, each of which is dedicated to a specific grade range.

=== Elementary schools ===
- Ginther Elementary School (Pre-K - 1), Principal – Randall Yu, Assistant Principal - Kelly Keenan
- Barclay Elementary School (2-3), Principal – Scott Morrison, Assistant Principal - Alana Roberts
- Fred W. Hill Elementary School (4-5), Principal – Tina Colby, Assistant Principal - Jeannine Limbeck

=== Middle school ===
- Oliver Middle School (6-8), Principal – Laura Mayer, Ed. D, Assistant Principals - Carey Belair and Michelle Guerrieri

=== High school ===
- Brockport High School (9-12), Principal – Michael Pincelli, Assistant Principals - Bobbie Dardano and David Iacchetta
