= Jessamine Chapman Williams =

American home economist

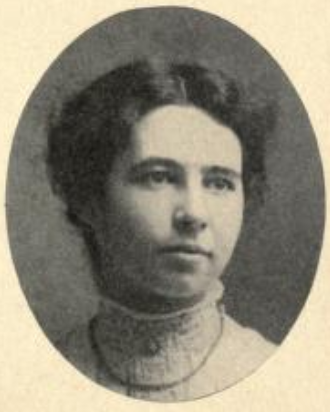
- Jessamine Chapman (later Williams), from the 1906 yearbook of Teachers College, Columbia University
- Born: Jessamine May Chapman; June 11, 1881; Brockport, New York
- Died: April 3, 1963 (aged 81)
- Occupation(s): Home economist, college professor, nutritionist

Jessamine May Chapman Williams (June 11, 1881 – April 3, 1963) was an American home economist, nutritionist, and college professor. She was head of the home economics department at Sweet Briar College, head of the Food and Nutrition Department at the University of Arizona from 1914 to 1923, and head of the Foods and Nutrition department at Oregon State University from 1924 until she retired in 1944.

== Early life and education ==
Chapman was born in Brockport, New York, the daughter of Byron H. Chapman and Josephine King Chapman. She trained as a teacher at the Brockport State Normal School, and graduated from Teachers College, Columbia University in 1906. She completed a master's degree there in 1921.

== Career ==
Chapman was head of the home economics department at Sweet Briar College from 1906 to 1911, head of the Food and Nutrition department at the University of Arizona from 1914 to 1923, and head of the Foods and Nutrition department at Oregon Agricultural College (now Oregon State University) from 1924 until she retired in 1944. She also taught for briefer stints, often at summer programs, at the University of Washington, Oklahoma State University, and Simmons College. In the mid-1920s she gave radio lectures for the Oregon State extension program on KOAC. She conducted nutritional experiments on rats for her research. She was active in the American Association of University Women, and the Corvallis chapter of AAUW named a fellowship in her memory.

== Publications ==
- "Remodeling the Conventional Christmas Dinner" (1913)
- "Reducing Time Spent in the Kitchen" (1914)
- "The Value of Diet Fads" (1914)
- "The Importance of Being a Cook" (1921)
- "The Use of Animal Experiments in College Nutrition Classes" (1924)
- "The Value and Use of Prunes" (1924)
- "The Use of Vegetables in the Home" (1925)
- "The School Child's Lunch Box" (1926)
- "Newer Emphases in Nutrition" (1934)
- "Possible Sources of Calcium and Phosphorus in the Chinese Diet" (1934, with Pik-Wan Hoh and Charles S. Pease)
- "Calcium with Meat Cooked in Acid" (1936)

== Personal life ==
Chapman married Canadian-born professor Richard H. Williams in 1913. She died in 1963, at the age of 81.
