= Soldiers' Memorial Tower =

- U.S. National Register of Historic Places
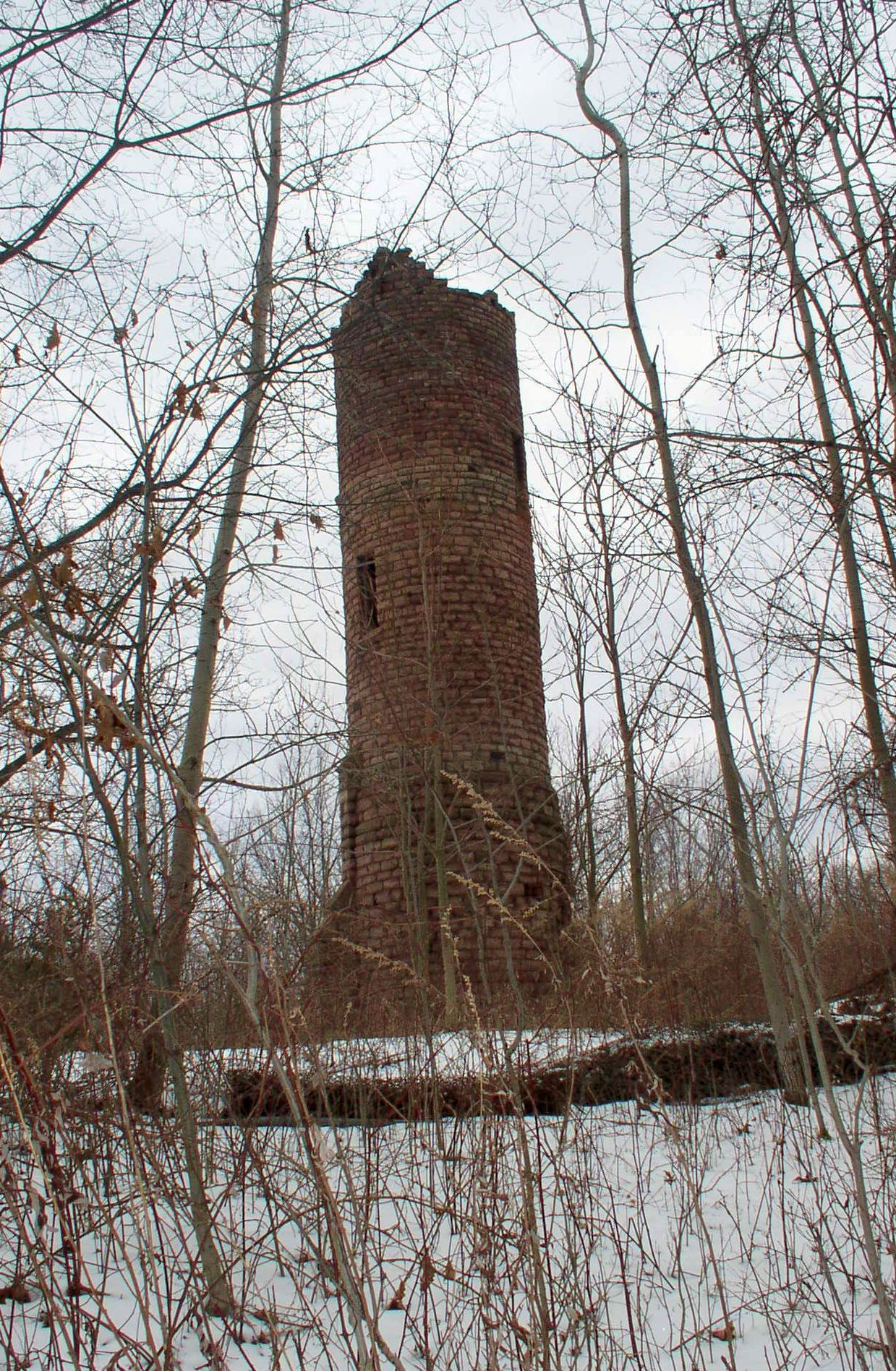
- Soldiers' Memorial Tower, February 2010

- Location within New York Location within the United States
- Location: Owens Rd. N of Conrail RR tracks, Brockport, New York
- Coordinates: 43°12′28″N 77°55′7″W
- Area: less than one acre
- Built: 1894
- Architect: Birdsell, Clarence
- Architectural style: Late Gothic Revival
- NRHP reference No.: 94000332
- Added to NRHP: April 08, 1994

Soldiers' Memorial Tower is a historic war memorial located at Brockport in Monroe County, New York. It was built in 1894 and is a commemorative monument to memorialize the town of Sweden's Civil War dead and marked the location of a small plot of land set aside for the free interment of local veterans. At one point, the grounds held the remains of more than twenty individuals, though precise records were not kept; all but a few have since been moved to other locations.

The round tower originally stood 52 feet (16 m) tall—though about a quarter of that height has been lost to erosion and damage over time—and is a Medina sandstone structure in the Late Gothic Revival style.

It was listed on the National Register of Historic Places in 1994, by which time it was already in significant disrepair. (listing #94000332 - 8 Apr 1994) The listing has been the only lasting result of the effort—begun around 1960—to restore the monument, though the event did not serve as the catalyst that supporters had hoped.

Soon after in 1995, the Army Reserve Officers Training Corps (ROTC) department at nearby SUNY Brockport began an educational/community service program to raise awareness of the Tower among ROTC students. Led by (then) Captain John McClellan, students received one additional credit hour when enrolled in the basic military science curriculum by participating in several hours of community service related to the Tower. The objective of the program was to research the names on the Tower, highlight their service records in the 140th New York Infantry Regiment in the American Civil War, and to hopefully connect with living descendants of these individuals as an eventual fundraising strategy. As these students already studied the Battle of Gettysburg as part of their leadership and military history curriculum, the text "Sons of Old Monroe - A Regimental History of Patrick O'Rorke's140th New York Volunteer Infantry" by Brian Bennett, was used in this program. The program was discontinued sometime after 1997.

Fundraising to help restore, or at least stabilize, the structure continued to be extremely weak. In December 2012, the trustees of the Brockport Rural Cemetery Association reached an agreement to transfer the monument and its 17 surrounding acres to the Town of Sweden, which intends to build a firehouse on the site. The Town intends to invest funds to stabilize the structure and make it safer, but it does not have the funds for a full restoration.
