= First Baptist Church (Brockport, New York) =

Historic church in New York, United States

- U.S. National Register of Historic Places
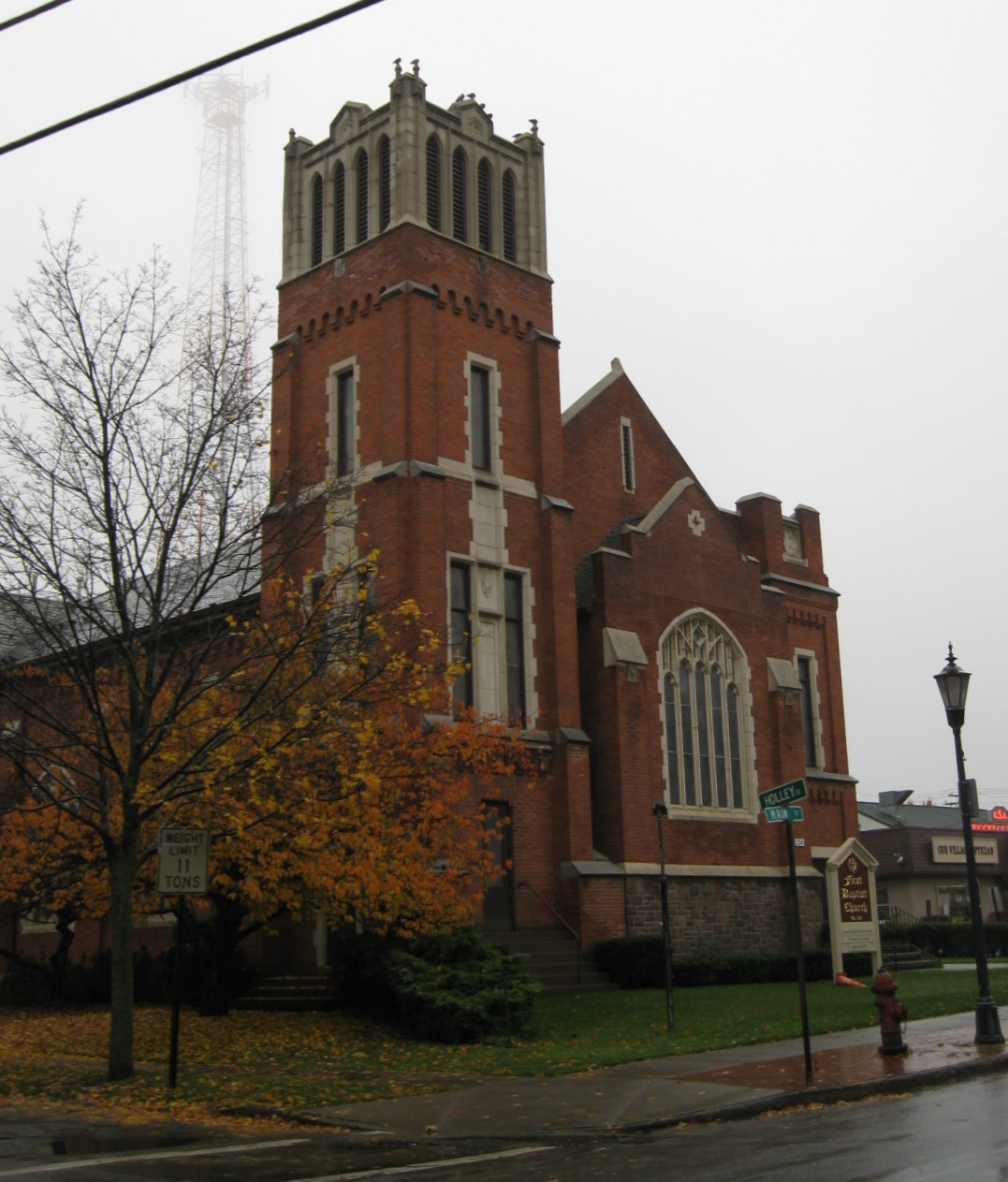
- First Baptist Church, October 2009

- Location within New York Location within the United States
- Location: 124 Main St., Brockport, New York
- Coordinates: 43°12′50″N 77°56′22″W
- Area: .15 acres (0.061 ha)
- Built: 1924-1929
- Built by: Cole, N.L.
- Architect: Foote, Orlando K., and Carpenter, Charles A.
- Architectural style: Collegiate Gothic, Tudor Revival
- NRHP reference No.: 11000752
- Added to NRHP: October 20, 2011

First Baptist Church is a historic Baptist church complex located at Brockport in Monroe County, New York. It was built between 1924 and 1929, and consists of a Collegiate Gothic–style church building with an attached Tudor Revival Social and Recreational wing. It measures 100 feet (30 m) wide and 140 feet (43 m) deep. The church is constructed of red brick with Norristone and Medina sandstone trim. It has a slate-covered gable roof and features engaged square towers flanking the main entrance. The Social and Recreational wing has a red brick first floor and half-timbered and stucco second story. It has Norristone trim and a hipped slate roof.

It was listed on the National Register of Historic Places in 2011.
