= Park Avenue and State Street Historic District =

Historic district in New York, United States

- U.S. National Register of Historic Places
- U.S. Historic district
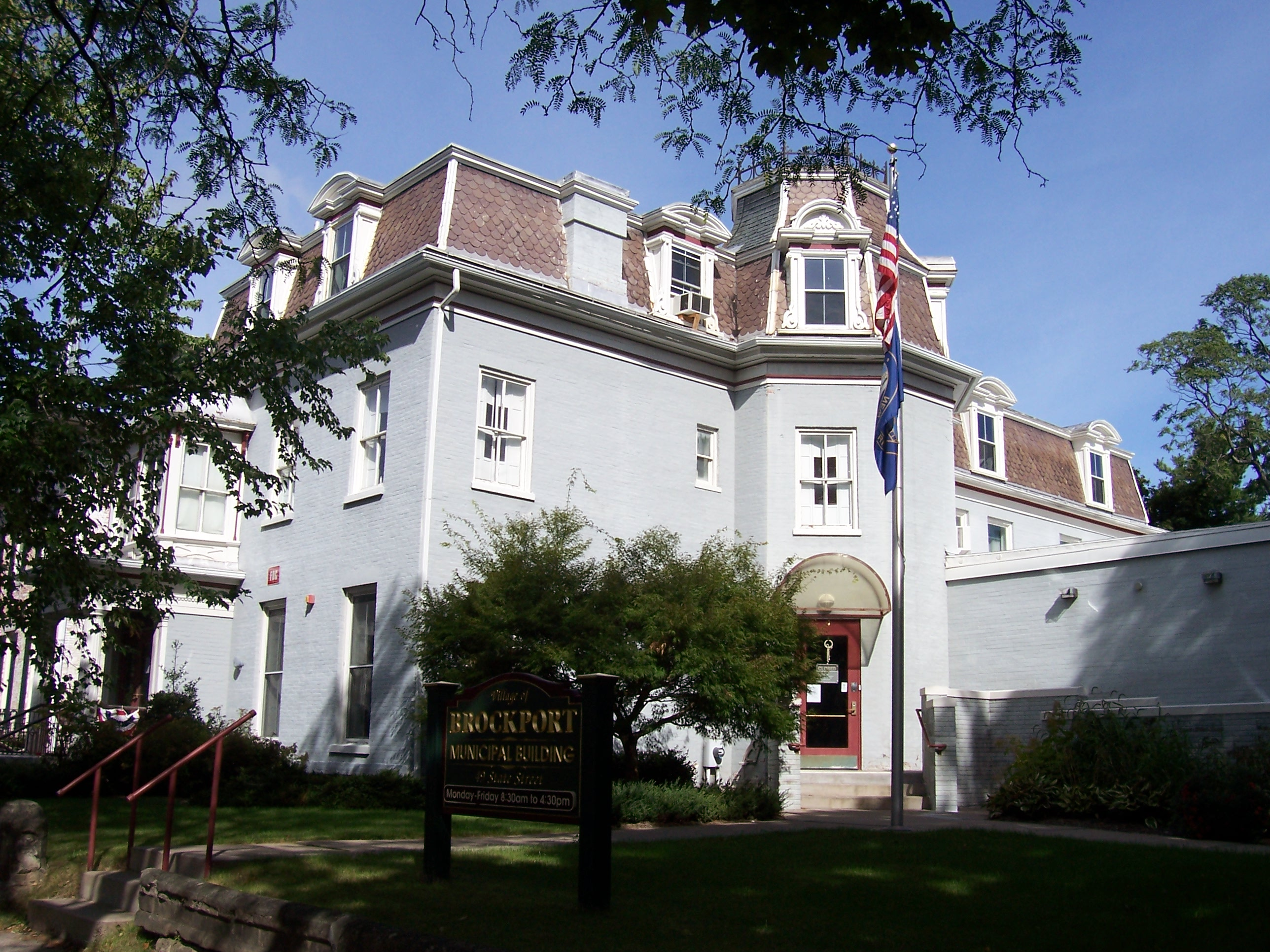
- 49 State Street

- Location within New York Location within the United States
- Location: 15-121 Park Ave., 15-118 State, 36-54 South, 6 & 12 High & 14 & 20 Spring Sts., Brockport, New York
- Coordinates: 43°12′47″N 77°56′16″W
- Area: 22.64 acres (9.16 ha)
- Built: c. 1830-1930
- Architect: Pelatiah Rogers, Hiram Hatch, Henry Scarles
- Architectural style: Greek Revival, Gothic Revival, Italianate, Queen Anne, Colonial Revival
- NRHP reference No.: 15000538
- Added to NRHP: August 24, 2015

Park Avenue and State Street Historic District is a national historic district located at Brockport in Monroe County, New York. The district encompasses 90 contributing buildings and 1 contributing site in a predominantly residential section of Brockport. The district developed between about 1830 and 1930, and includes buildings in a variety of architectural styles including Greek Revival, Gothic Revival, Italianate, Queen Anne, and Colonial Revival. Located in the district is the separately listed First Presbyterian Church. Other notable buildings include houses dated to the 1830s and 1840s.

It was listed on the National Register of Historic Places in 2015.
