= Main Street Historic District (Brockport, New York) =

Historic district in New York, United States

- U.S. National Register of Historic Places
- U.S. Historic district
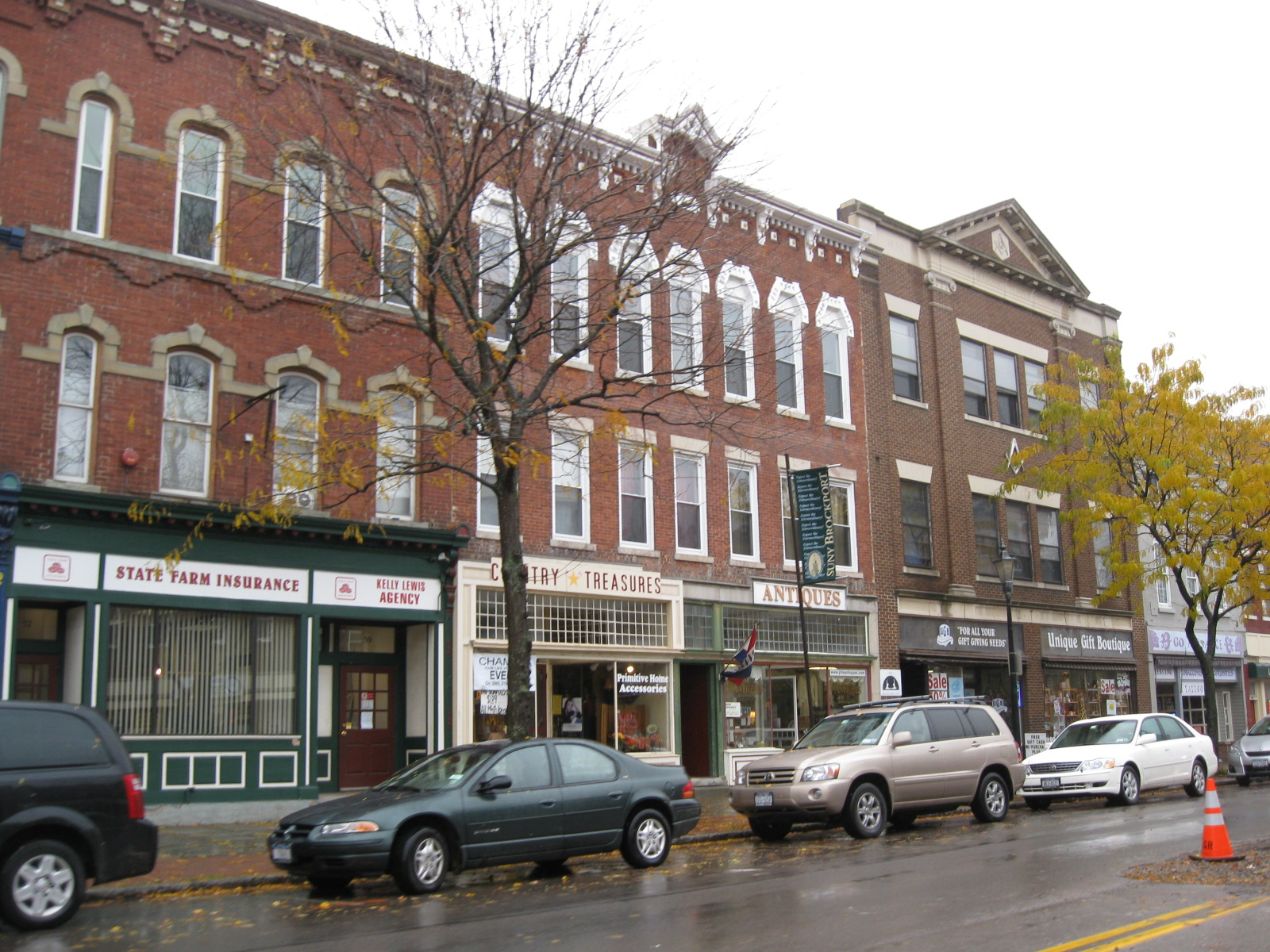
- Main Street Historic District, October 2009

- Location within New York Location within the United States
- Location: Main, Market and King Sts., Brockport, New York
- Coordinates: 43°13′0″N 77°56′18″W
- Area: 8.5 acres (3.4 ha)
- Architectural style: Greek Revival, Late Victorian
- NRHP reference No.: 04000227
- Added to NRHP: April 02, 2004

Main Street Historic District is a national historic district located at Brockport in Monroe County, New York. The district encompasses 51 contributing structures and one contributing structure, a canal lift bridge. All buildings in the district are commercial, except the U.S. Post Office and a church.

It was listed on the National Register of Historic Places in 2004.

== Gallery ==
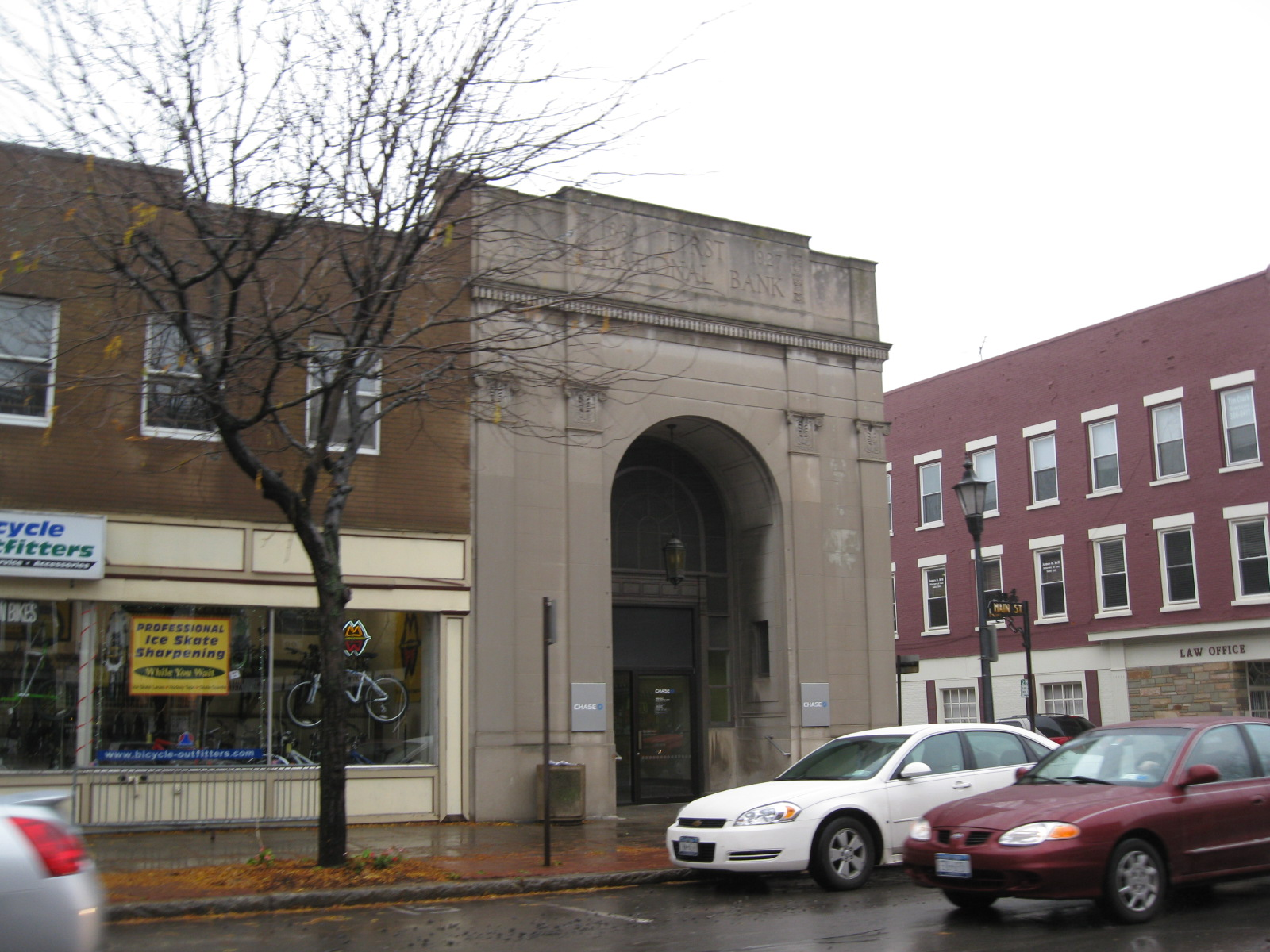
First National Bank, October 2009

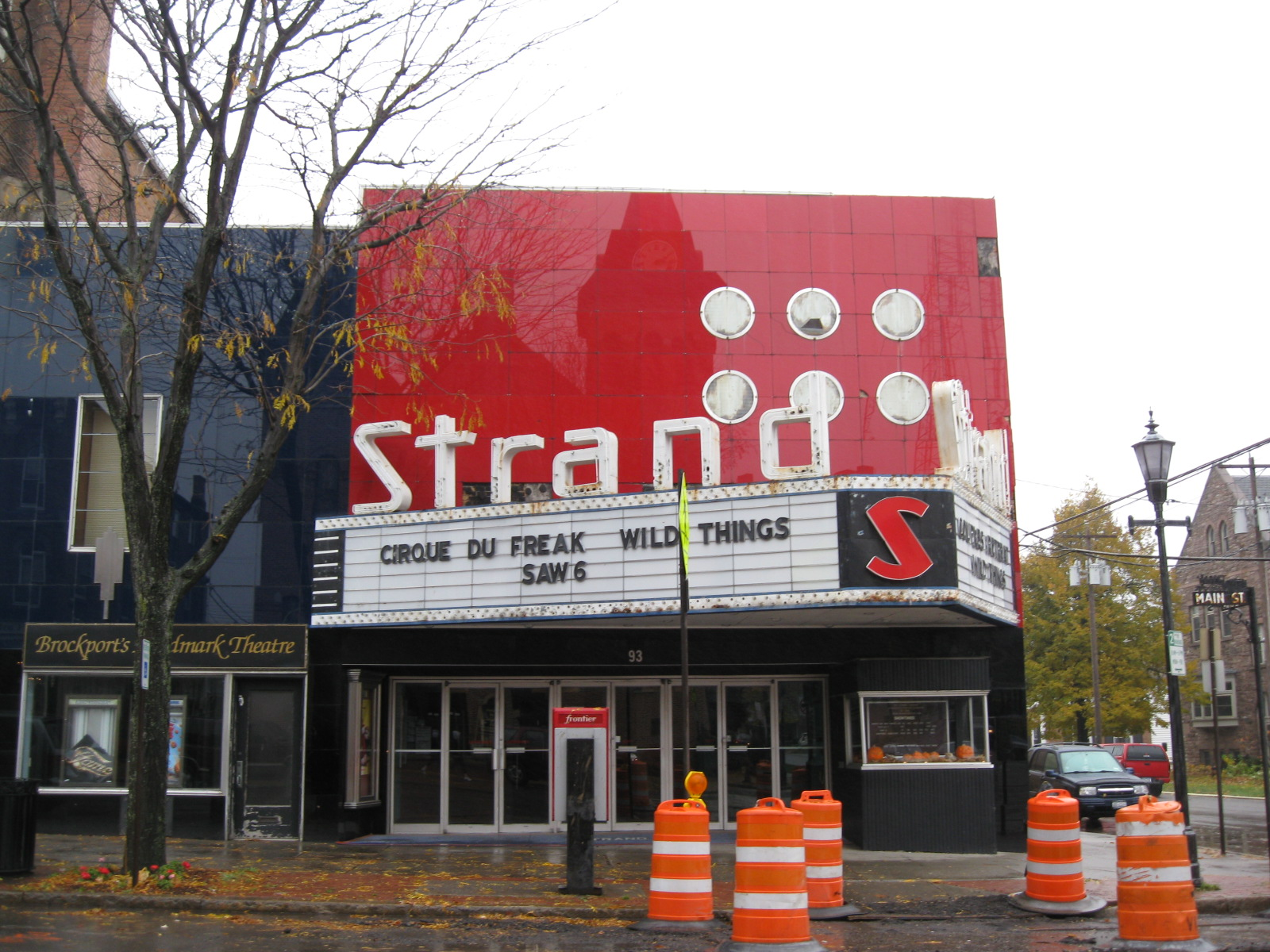
Strand Theater, October 2009

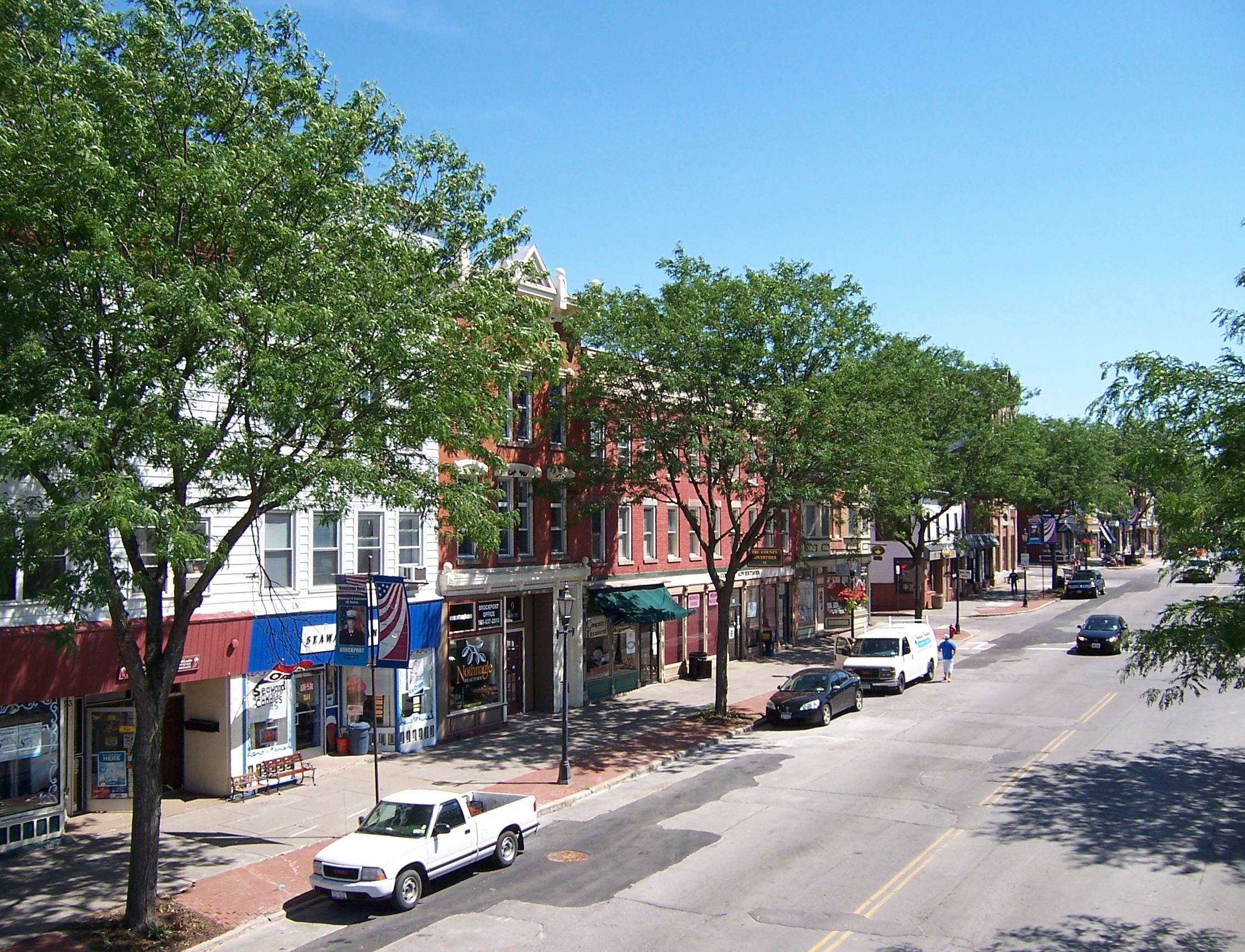
View from the Main Street bridge, July 2011
