= Edward Harrison House =

Historic house in New York, United States

- U.S. National Register of Historic Places
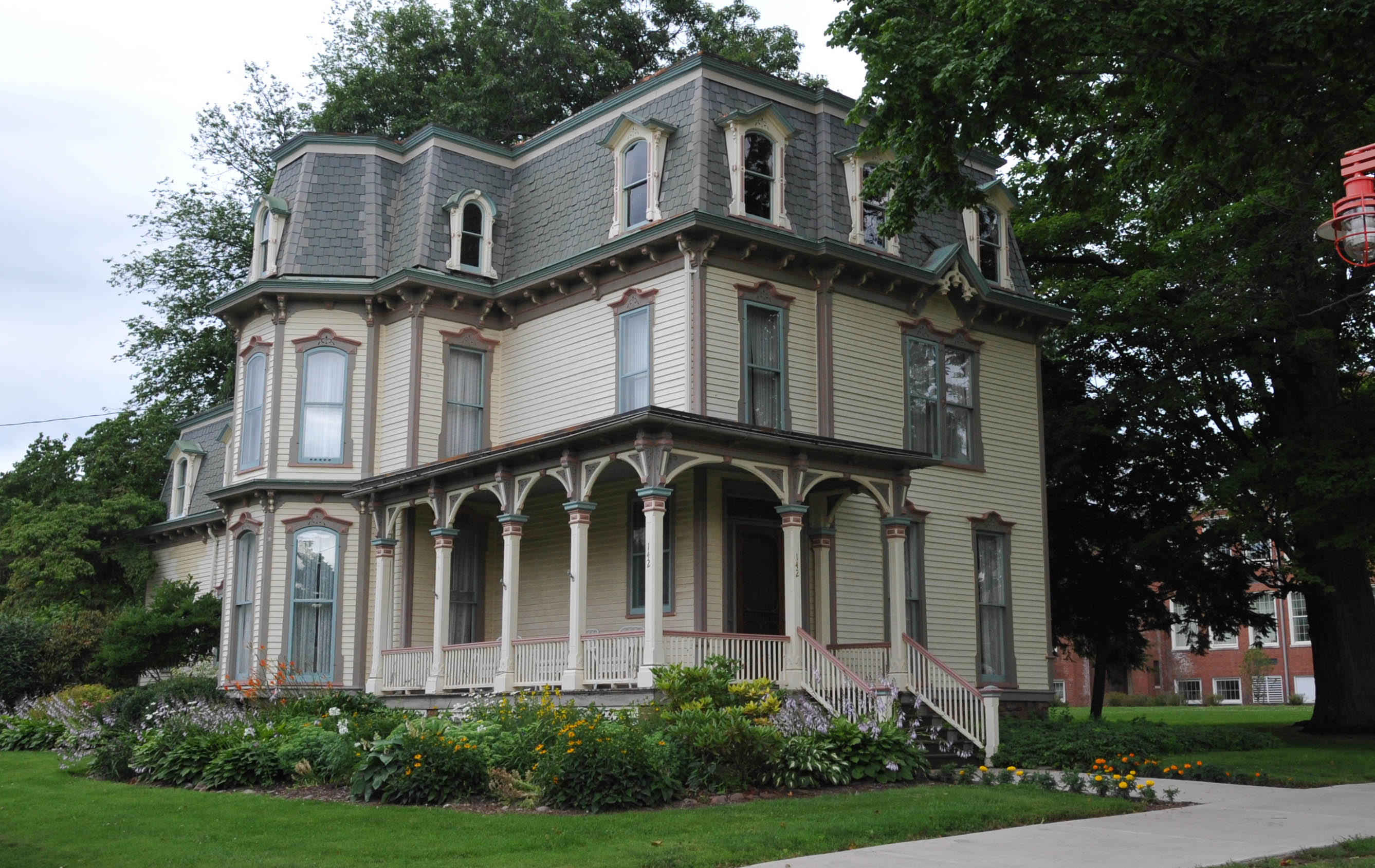
- Edward Harrison House, January 2008

- Location within New York Location within the United States
- Location: 75 College St., Brockport, New York
- Coordinates: 43°12′42″N 77°56′42″W
- Area: 0.31 acres (0.13 ha)
- Built: 1877
- Architectural style: Second Empire, Colonial Revival
- NRHP reference No.: 10000854
- Added to NRHP: October 22, 2010

Edward Harrison House, also known as Brockport Alumni House, is a historic home located at Brockport, Monroe County, New York. It was built in 1877, and is a three-story, Second Empire style frame dwelling with a two-story rear wing. It features a steeply pitched mansard roof with segmental arch dormers and a front porch with decorative brackets. The house was renovated about 1900, and some Colonial Revival style design elements were added to the interior. The house was sold to the State of New York in 1898, and has been used for various purposes by the State University of New York at Brockport and its predecessors.

It was listed on the National Register of Historic Places in 2010.
