= First Presbyterian Church (Brockport, New York) =

Historic church in New York, United States

- U.S. National Register of Historic Places
- U.S. Historic district – Contributing property
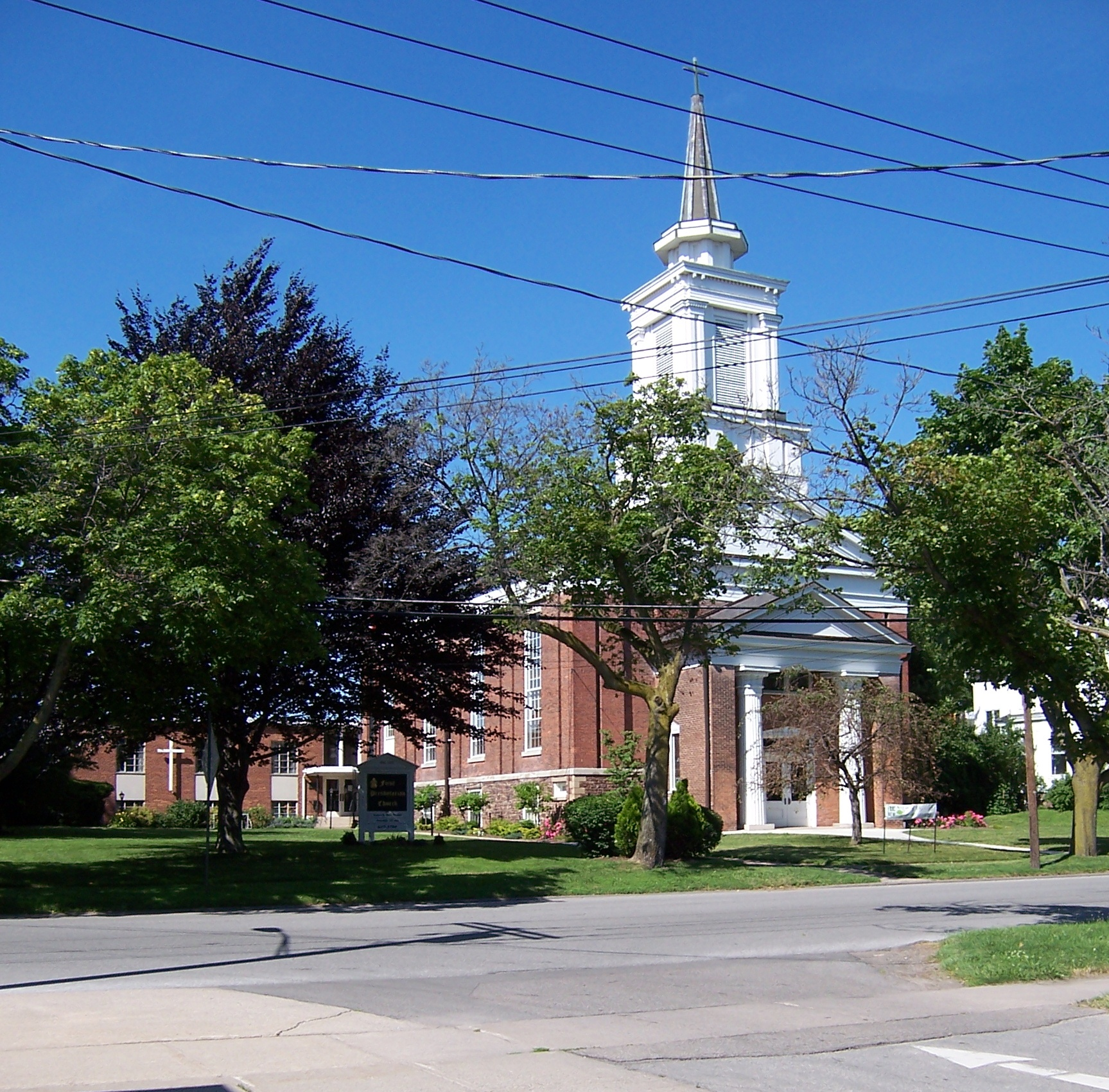
- First Presbyterian Church, July 2011

- Location within New York Location within the United States
- Location: 35 State St., Brockport, New York
- Coordinates: 43°12′52″N 77°56′14″W
- Area: 0.7 acres (0.28 ha)
- Built: 1852
- Architectural style: Greek Revival
- NRHP reference No.: 99000752
- Added to NRHP: June 25, 1999

First Presbyterian Church, incorporated as the Congregational Society of Brockport, is a historic Presbyterian church located at Brockport in Monroe County, New York. It is a Greek Revival–style edifice built in 1852. The main block of the building is four bays long and three bays wide (76 feet by 52 feet), constructed of red brick on a sandstone foundation. It features a three-stage tower with an octagonal drum from which the spire rises. The main worship space has a meeting house plan with a three sided upper gallery supported by fluted Doric columns.

It was listed on the National Register of Historic Places in 1999. It is located in the Park Avenue and State Street Historic District.
