= Bill Van Gundy =

American basketball coach

- Coaching career: 1967–1999

Career history

Coaching
- 1967–1968: Alhambra HS
- 1968–1970: Saint Mary's (assistant)
- 1970–1977: Cal State East Bay (assistant)
- 1976–1977: Cabrillo HS
- 1977–1983: SUNY Brockport
- 1984–1999: Genesee CC

Career highlights
- As head coach: 5× Penn York Athletic Conference championships

William "Bill" Van Gundy is an American former college basketball coach, most notable for being the father of Jeff Van Gundy and Stan Van Gundy, both of whom have served as head coaches in the National Basketball Association. He recommended Stan for the job as assistant with the Miami Heat after Pat Riley left the New York Knicks for Miami.

== College coaching ==
Van Gundy held the position of head coach at Brockport State University until he was dismissed and moved on to Genesee Community College. Bill earned more that 600 games as a college coach. He was inducted into the New York State Basketball Hall of Fame.
