= A.D. Oliver Middle School =

Middle school in Brockport, New York

- U.S. National Register of Historic Places
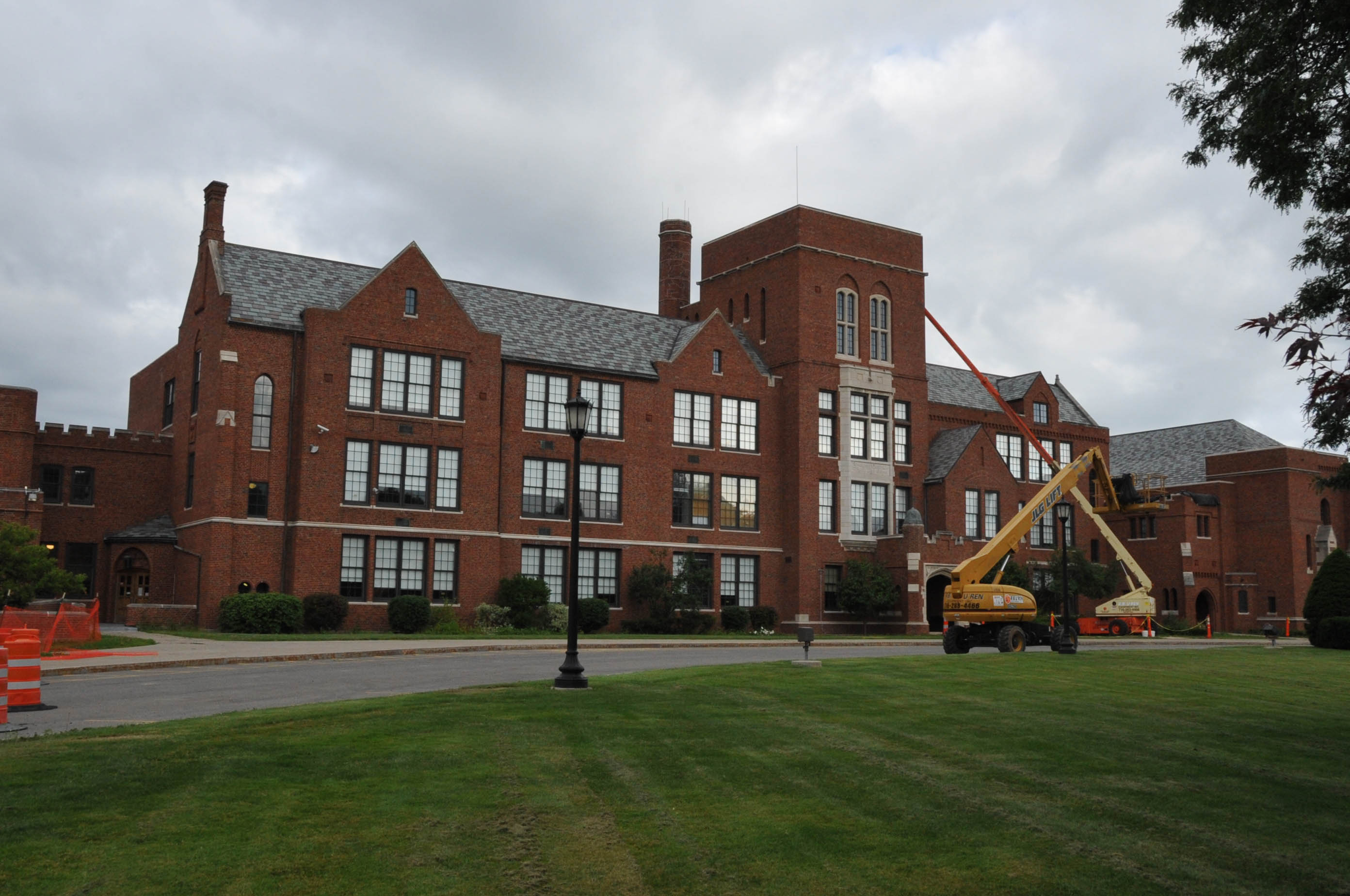
- A.D. Oliver Middle School, January 2008

- Location within New York Location within the United States
- Location: 40 Allen St., #600, Brockport, New York
- Coordinates: 43°12′26″N 77°56′51″W
- Area: 23.41 acres (9.47 ha)
- Built: 1934, 1956, 1996
- Architect: Harwood B. Dryer
- Architectural style: English Tudor Revival
- NRHP reference No.: 11000805
- Added to NRHP: November 10, 2011

A.D. Oliver Middle School is located in Brockport, Monroe County, New York. It was built in 1934, and is a three-story, English Tudor Revival style reinforced concrete and brick building with three sections. It has molded bricks and terra cotta decorative elements and Indiana limestone trim. Attached to the original building is a 1956 gymnasium addition and an addition built in 1996. The building housed the Brockport Central Rural High School until 1967, when Brockport High School was constructed, and since then has been used as a middle school. It serves grades six, seven and eight. Dr. Laura Mayer, Ed. D is the principal; Mrs. Carey Belair and Mrs. Michelle Guerrieri are the assistant principals.

The school was listed on the National Register of Historic Places in 2011.
