= Jeff Van Gundy =

American basketball coach and commentator (born 1962)

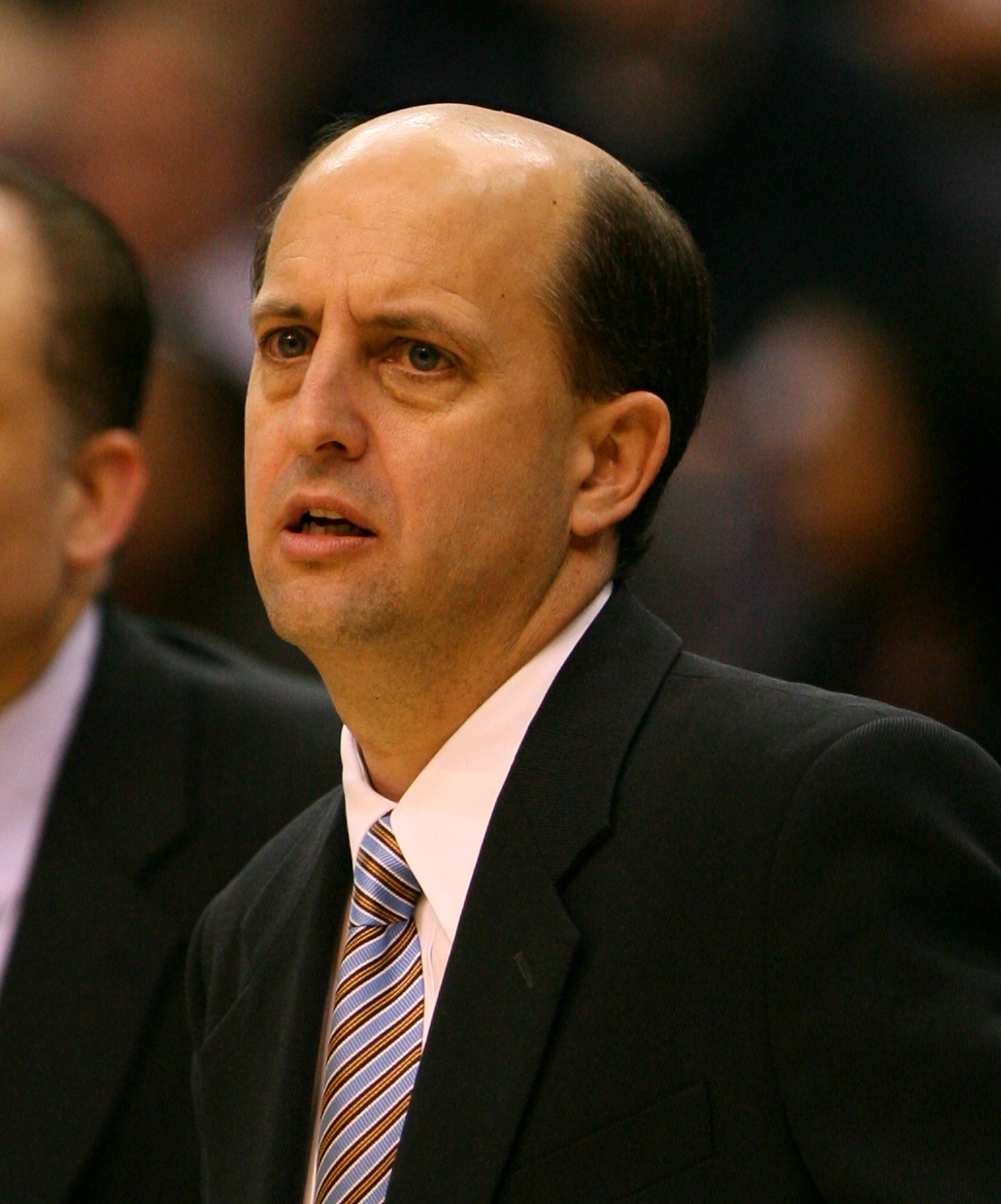
- Van Gundy with the Houston Rockets in 2006

Los Angeles Clippers
- Title: Lead assistant coach
- League: NBA

Personal information
- Born: January 19, 1962 (age 64) Hemet, California, U.S.

Career information
- High school: Brockport (Brockport, New York)
- College: Menlo (1981–1982); Brockport (1982–1983); Nazareth (NY) (1983–1985)
- Position: Point guard
- Coaching career: 1985–2007, 2024–present

Career highlights
- As coach: NBA All-Star Game head coach (2000); As senior consultant: NBA champion (2024)
Medals
Men's basketball
Head Coach for United States
FIBA AmeriCup
Gold medal – first place	2017 Argentina

Jeffrey William Van Gundy (born January 19, 1962) is an American basketball coach and former commentator who is the lead assistant coach for the Los Angeles Clippers of the National Basketball Association (NBA). Van Gundy previously served as head coach in the NBA for the New York Knicks and the Houston Rockets. During his tenure with the Knicks, he led the team to the 1999 NBA Finals, where they ultimately fell to the San Antonio Spurs in five games. Van Gundy won an NBA championship in 2024 with the Boston Celtics, where he served as a senior consultant in the front office.

== Early life ==
Van Gundy was born in Hemet, California, and lived in Martinez, California until 1977. His family moved to Brockport, New York, while Van Gundy was still in high school, and he attended and played basketball at Brockport High School.

He is the son of basketball coach Bill Van Gundy, the former head coach at SUNY Brockport and at Genesee Community College, and the younger brother of former NBA coach Stan Van Gundy.

As a high school point guard, Van Gundy was a two-time All Greater Rochester selection in 1979 and 1980, leading Brockport to the Class AA finals. Van Gundy attended Yale University before transferring to Menlo College, and ultimately graduating from New York's Nazareth University in 1985.

At Nazareth, Van Gundy led the Golden Flyers to an NCAA Division III tournament berth in 1984. He remains the Nazareth career leader in free throw percentage, at 86.8%.

== Coaching career ==
=== Early career ===
Van Gundy began his basketball coaching career during the 1985–86 season, at McQuaid Jesuit High School, in Rochester, New York. The following year, he became a graduate assistant under head coach Rick Pitino, at Providence College, helping the Providence Friars advance to the Final Four. In his second season with the Friars, he was promoted to assistant coach under Gordon Chiesa. The next season, Van Gundy became an assistant coach under Bob Wenzel, at Rutgers.

=== New York Knicks ===
On July 28, 1989, Van Gundy became an assistant coach for the New York Knicks. He spent the next six-and-a-half seasons providing support to Knicks head coaches Stu Jackson (1989–1990), John MacLeod (1990–1991), Pat Riley (1991–1995), and Don Nelson (1995–1996). During his tenure as an assistant coach, the Knicks won three Atlantic Division titles, never finished lower than third in the division, and qualified for the playoffs every year. The Knicks advanced to the Eastern Conference finals in 1993, and the NBA Finals versus the Houston Rockets in 1994.

On March 8, 1996, the Knicks named Van Gundy their next head coach, taking over the reins from Don Nelson. In his second game as head coach, he notably led the Knicks to a 32-point blowout win over the Michael Jordan-led Chicago Bulls, who had eliminated the Knicks from the playoffs four times since 1989. However, Van Gundy was unable to change that trend in the postseason, as the Knicks fell to Chicago in the conference semifinals.

In his first full season as head coach, the Knicks tied for the third-best record in franchise history, at 57–25. In the regular season finale, the Knicks defeated the 69–12 Chicago Bulls in Chicago, preventing them from posting two consecutive 70-win seasons in a row, and tying the best home record in NBA history. Van Gundy was involved in a memorable scene in the 1998 NBA Playoffs series between the Knicks and the Miami Heat. When the Heat's center Alonzo Mourning and the Knicks' power forward Larry Johnson engaged in a bench-clearing brawl, Van Gundy unsuccessfully tried to break the fight up. In the process, he fell to the floor and clung to Mourning's leg.

In the lockout-shortened 1998–99 season, the Knicks struggled with injuries (namely to all-star Patrick Ewing) and finished 27–23 to finish as the eighth seed for the playoffs. In the first round of the playoffs, the Knicks upset the Heat in five games, avenging the previous season's playoff loss and becoming just the second 8th seed to defeat the number one seed in the playoffs. The win propelled an improbable run for the Knicks, as they swept the Hawks in the semifinals, and defeated the Pacers in six games, to advance to the NBA Finals, becoming the first eighth-seeded team in NBA history to do so. Without Ewing, they were overmatched in the Finals against the Spurs, and lost the series in five games.

The Knicks followed up their Finals run with a 50–32 season, and advanced to the Conference finals, where they were defeated by the Indiana Pacers. Until the 2013 playoffs, this was the last time the Knicks won a playoff series, and until 2025, this was New York's last conference finals appearance.

In a 2001 game between the Spurs and Knicks, Danny Ferry elbowed Marcus Camby. While talking to the referee, Camby lost control and tried to punch Ferry. Camby missed and hit Van Gundy instead, who said he learned his lesson about trying to break up fights between players. The Knicks finished 48–34, but lost in the first round to the Raptors.

Just 19 games into the 2001–02 season, Van Gundy resigned from the Knicks' head coach position. The move was unexpected, as the Knicks were on a winning streak, and coming off a 14-point victory against the Milwaukee Bucks.

=== Houston Rockets ===
On June 10, 2003, Van Gundy was named head coach of the Houston Rockets, replacing Rudy Tomjanovich. In his first season as the team's head coach, the Rockets finished with a 45–37 record, and qualified for the playoffs for the first time in five years, but they were eliminated in the first round of the playoffs by the Los Angeles Lakers.

In his second season with the Rockets, Van Gundy guided the team, led by Yao Ming and Tracy McGrady, to a 51–31 record, which was their first season with more than 50 wins since 1996–97. The Rockets once again lost in the first round of the playoffs, this time to the Dallas Mavericks.

McGrady and Yao missed a combined 70 games due to injury in the 2005–06 season, and Van Gundy did not make the playoffs for the first time in his NBA head coaching career. In May 2005, Van Gundy was fined $100,000 by the NBA, for accusing referees of targeting Houston Rockets center Yao Ming. Van Gundy blamed Dallas Mavericks owner Mark Cuban for causing the referees' alleged bias. This is the largest fine handed down to a coach in NBA history.

The injuries and disappointments continued for the Rockets into the following season, with injuries limiting Yao to just 48 games played, and McGrady also not fully recovered from his injuries. The Rockets went on a late season run, on the back of a resurgence from McGrady, but another first round playoff loss, this time to the Utah Jazz, sealed Van Gundy's fate as the team's head coach. At the conclusion of their decisive Game 7 loss in the first round of the playoffs, Van Gundy was fired, and then replaced by Rick Adelman.

=== National team career ===
In July 2017, it was announced that Van Gundy would be the head coach of the senior United States national team at the 2017 FIBA AmeriCup tournament, and in the qualifiers for the 2019 FIBA World Cup in China. USA head coach Gregg Popovich would then resume coaching the team at the World Cup, and at the 2020 Summer Olympics, should they qualify for either. Team USA became Van Gundy's first coaching job since leaving the Rockets in 2007.

Van Gundy went on to guide the US to the gold medal at the 2017 FIBA AmeriCup, and also to qualify for the 2019 FIBA World Cup.

=== Front-office career ===
On October 14, 2023, the Boston Celtics announced that Van Gundy had joined the team as a senior consultant to the basketball operations division. The Celtics defeated the Dallas Mavericks in the 2024 NBA Finals, giving Van Gundy his first NBA Championship.

=== Los Angeles Clippers ===
On June 18, 2024, the Los Angeles Clippers hired Van Gundy to serve as lead assistant under head coach Tyronn Lue, his first NBA coaching job in any capacity since 2007.

== Broadcasting career ==
Following his resignation from the New York Knicks in 2001, Van Gundy joined TNT for a one game experiment to work alongside play-by-play announcer Marv Albert and Mike Fratello for a Philadelphia 76ers–Orlando Magic game in January 2002. He collaborated with Albert and Fratello on several broadcasts during the 2001–02 season before signing a two-year deal with the network becoming a permanent analyst alongside the duo for the 2002–03 campaign, including the 2003 NBA All-Star Game.

During the 2003 NBA playoffs, he served as the color commentator paired with Dick Stockton for the first two rounds. He then reunited with Albert and Fratello to cover the Western Conference Finals between the San Antonio Spurs and Dallas Mavericks. That summer, he departed TNT after being hired by the Houston Rockets. However, he returned to the network as a guest analyst during the 2006 NBA playoffs; following the Rockets' failure to qualify for the postseason, TNT paired him with Matt Devlin to provide commentary during the opening round.

Following his firing from the Houston Rockets in 2007, Van Gundy was a guest analyst for ESPN's broadcast of Game 6 of the Phoenix Suns–San Antonio Spurs series in the 2007 NBA playoffs alongside Mike Breen and Jon Barry. He would then continue to work for the network during the 2007 Western Conference Finals and the 2007 NBA Finals. Soon after, he signed a deal to become a regular broadcast member for ESPN.

He called games as a color commentator with play-by-play announcer Mike Breen and Mark Jackson, including the NBA Finals 15 times. He missed Game 1 of the 2022 NBA Finals due to COVID-19 protocols, leaving behind Mark Jones, Mark Jackson, and Lisa Salters.

In June 2023, Van Gundy was let go by ESPN amid a wave of layoffs at the network.

== Personal life ==
Van Gundy's older brother is Stan Van Gundy, who is a former head coach of the NBA's Miami Heat, Orlando Magic, New Orleans Pelicans, and Detroit Pistons.

On May 8, 2011, Van Gundy received an honorary degree of Doctor of Humane Letters, from his alma mater, Nazareth University, during the college's 84th Annual Commencement Ceremony.

In 2015, Van Gundy and his wife Kim hosted USWNT soccer players Meghan Klingenberg and Morgan Gautrat in their Houston home while they were playing for the Houston Dash in the National Women's Soccer League to help spare the players from having to rent apartments for short periods of time.

== NBA head coaching record ==
Legend
Regular season	G	Games coached	W	Games won	L	Games lost	W–L %	Win–loss %
Playoffs	PG	Playoff games	PW	Playoff wins	PL	Playoff losses	PW–L %	Playoff win–loss %

Team	Year	G	W	L	W–L%	Finish	PG	PW	PL	PW–L%	Result
New York	1995–96	23	13	10	.565	2nd in Atlantic	8	4	4	.500	Lost in Conference semifinals
New York	1996–97	82	57	25	.695	2nd in Atlantic	10	6	4	.600	Lost in Conference semifinals
New York	1997–98	82	43	39	.524	2nd in Atlantic	10	4	6	.400	Lost in Conference semifinals
New York	1998–99	50	27	23	.540	4th in Atlantic	20	12	8	.600	Lost in NBA Finals
New York	1999–00	82	50	32	.610	2nd in Atlantic	16	9	7	.563	Lost in Conference finals
New York	2000–01	82	48	34	.585	3rd in Atlantic	5	2	3	.400	Lost in first round
New York	2001–02	19	10	9	.526	(resigned)	—	—	—	—	—
Houston	2003–04	82	45	37	.549	5th in Midwest	5	1	4	.200	Lost in first round
Houston	2004–05	82	51	31	.622	3rd in Southwest	7	3	4	.429	Lost in first round
Houston	2005–06	82	34	48	.415	5th in Southwest	—	—	—	—	Missed playoffs
Houston	2006–07	82	52	30	.634	3rd in Southwest	7	3	4	.429	Lost in first round
Career		748	430	318	.575		88	44	44	.500	
