= Jim Cosman =

American baseball player (1943–2013)

- Pitcher
- Born: February 19, 1943; Brockport, New York, U.S.
- Died: January 7, 2013 (aged 69); Roswell, Georgia, U.S.
- Batted: Right Threw: Right

MLB debut
- October 2, 1966, for the St. Louis Cardinals

Last MLB appearance
- April 30, 1970, for the Chicago Cubs

MLB statistics
- Win–loss record: 2–0
- Earned run average: 3.05
- Strikeouts: 16
- Stats at Baseball Reference

Teams
- St. Louis Cardinals (1966–1967); Chicago Cubs (1970)

James Henry Cosman (February 19, 1943 – January 7, 2013) was an American professional baseball pitcher who appeared in Major League Baseball over parts of three seasons for the 1966–1967 St. Louis Cardinals and the 1970 Chicago Cubs. A right-hander, he was listed as 6 feet 4 inches (1.93 m) tall and 211 pounds (96 kg).

Cosman was a native of Brockport in Western New York; he graduated from Father Ryan High School in Nashville and attended Middle Tennessee State University, signing with the Cardinals in 1963. In 1966, after completing his fourth year in the Redbird farm system, he was a late-season call-up and, in his MLB debut on the season's last day, threw a complete game, two-hit shutout against the Cubs at Busch Memorial Stadium; the only safeties he surrendered were singles to Ron Santo in the second inning and Glenn Beckert in the ninth.

Cosman divided the 1967 campaign between the National League pennant-winning Cardinals and Triple-A, working in ten games pitched (with five starts) for St. Louis. On June 26, against the San Francisco Giants at St. Louis in the second starting assignment of his MLB career, he earned his second victory, holding the Giants to four hits and one run in 81/3 innings pitched, although he yielded seven bases on balls. Nelson Briles preserved Cosman's 3–1 triumph.

But Cosman returned to the minor leagues for all of 1968 and 1969; he spent the latter year in the New York Mets' and Cincinnati Reds' organizations, and then was selected in the 1969 Rule 5 draft by the Cubs, for whom he made one appearance in 1970 as a relief pitcher. In his 12 big-league games pitched (with six starting assignments), he won each of his two decisions and posted a 3.05 earned run average. In 411/3 innings pitched, he allowed 26 hits and 27 bases on balls, with 16 strikeouts. He retired from pro baseball in 1971 after nine seasons.

After baseball, Cosman worked in the waste management industry, as an executive for Browning Ferris Industries and as CEO of Republic Services until his retirement in 2000.

A longtime resident of the Pittsburgh, Pennsylvania area, he died at his home in Roswell, Georgia at age 69.
