= Stan Van Gundy =

American basketball coach and analyst

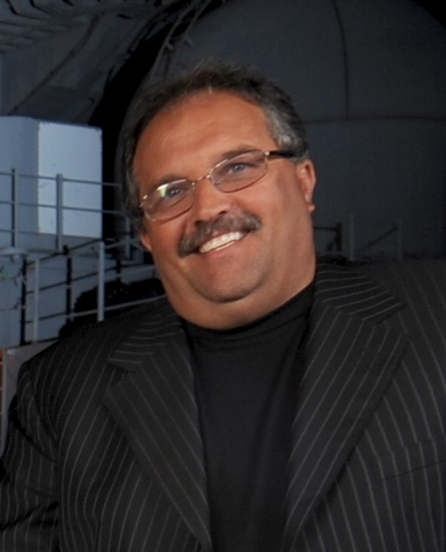
- Van Gundy in 2012

Personal information
- Born: August 26, 1959 (age 67) Indio, California, U.S.
- Listed height: 5 ft 8 in (1.73 m)
- Listed weight: 270 lb (122 kg)

Career information
- High school: Alhambra (Martinez, California)
- College: Brockport (1977–1981)
- Coaching career: 1981–2021

Career highlights
- 2× NBA All-Star Game head coach (2005, 2010)

Stanley Alan Van Gundy (born August 26, 1959) is an American former basketball coach who is a television commentator for College Basketball on CBS for CBS Sports and NBA on Prime for Sports on Amazon Prime Video. He previously worked as game analyst for NBA on TNT from 2019 to 2020, and again from 2021 to 2025. Prior to TNT, he was most recently the head coach for the New Orleans Pelicans of the NBA. He also served as the head coach and president of basketball operations for the Detroit Pistons from 2014 to 2018. From 2003 to 2005, he was the head coach of the Miami Heat but resigned in 2005 mid-season, returning the job over to Pat Riley. Van Gundy then coached the Orlando Magic for five seasons from 2007 to 2012, leading them to the 2009 NBA Finals. He is the older brother of former New York Knicks and Houston Rockets head coach Jeff Van Gundy.

== Playing career ==
Van Gundy was a starting guard at Alhambra High School in Martinez, California in the San Francisco Bay Area. After his senior year, he played for an all-county team that also included Kenny Carter, whose coaching career was the basis for Coach Carter, a Hollywood feature film starring Samuel L. Jackson. Van Gundy played college basketball for his father, Bill Van Gundy, at SUNY-Brockport, a Division III school, until he graduated in 1981 with a B.A. in English and a B.S. in Physical Education.

== Coaching career ==
=== College ===
Van Gundy began his coaching career as an assistant coach at the University of Vermont, 1981–83, and was head coach at Castleton State College in Vermont for three seasons from 1983 to 1986. After his first season as Castleton head coach, the NAIA named Van Gundy the District 5 Coach of the Year. Castleton finished 1984–85 the top team in the NAIA's Mayflower Conference and won the NAIA District 5 tournament. After serving as an assistant coach at Canisius College in 1987 and Fordham University in 1988, Van Gundy was named head coach at the University of Lowell. During his four-season tenure at the school, which saw the institution become the University of Massachusetts Lowell, he compiled a record of 54–60 and coached Leo Parent, whom Van Gundy called "the best Division 2 player in the nation."

Van Gundy then became an assistant at the University of Wisconsin under Stu Jackson. When Jackson left after 2 years to become general manager of the expansion NBA Vancouver franchise, Van Gundy was promoted to replace him as head coach and given a 5-year contract. Coming off an 18–11 season with future NBA star Michael Finley back for his senior year and highly touted recruits coming in, the team went into the season with high expectations, but ended with a disappointing 13–14 record (7–11 and ninth place in the Big 10). Van Gundy was fired at the end of the season and given a buyout for the 4 years remaining on his contract. Van Gundy blamed financial concerns at the school for his firing. The team would go on to hire Dick Bennett from the University of Wisconsin–Green Bay and he finished his first year with a 17–15 record and NIT appearance despite losing Finley and other key players.

Overall, Van Gundy compiled a record of 135–92 (.595) in eight years as a college head coach.

=== Miami Heat ===
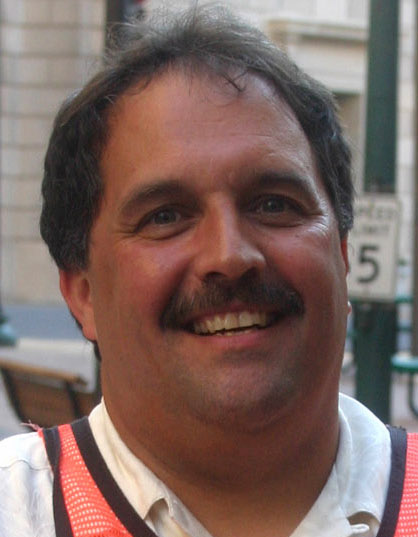
Van Gundy in 2005

When Pat Riley left the New York Knicks to coach the Miami Heat, the Knicks refused to let him hire Jeff Van Gundy, perhaps his most valuable assistant. Riley hired Stan, his brother, saying "I wanted at least one Van Gundy with me". Stan Van Gundy spent 12 years with the Heat. After working as an assistant under Riley, Van Gundy was named head coach when Riley abruptly resigned as coach prior to the 2003–04 season. However, Riley remained as President of the team. Van Gundy took over a team that had won 25 games the previous season. He led them to a 42-win season, in which they won a very high percentage of their late season games and surprised many by advancing to the second round of the 2004 NBA playoffs, nearly defeating the team with the league's best record, the Indiana Pacers, with Van Gundy's dynamic coaching showcasing the strong play of rookie Dwyane Wade.

During the off-season, Shaquille O'Neal demanded a trade and made Miami the only viable option for the Lakers to make a transaction with. Riley gave up Caron Butler, Lamar Odom, Brian Grant and a future first-round draft choice, replacing three of the team's starters, including an Olympian, with O'Neal. Van Gundy led the Heat to the best record in the Eastern Conference in the first half of the season, becoming the first Heat coach to coach in the All-Star Game, where he led the East to a victory. The Heat finished the season with 59 wins, earning the best record in the conference. The Heat went on to advance to Game 7 of the Eastern Conference finals, where they lost to the Detroit Pistons. Injuries played a factor in their defeat, particularly a rib injury to leading scorer Wade during Game 5, which prevented him from playing Game 6 and severely hindered him in Game 7, both Piston wins.

During the 2005 off-season, it was widely speculated that Pat Riley was attempting to run Van Gundy out of his coaching job and take over the job himself, now that the team was in a position to contend for the championship. Van Gundy would resign from his position as head coach on December 12, 2005, just 21 games into the season, citing a need to spend more time with his family. Riley replaced him as head coach, and led Miami to their first championship that same season.

In Shaquille O'Neal's book, "Shaq Uncut: My Story", O'Neal responded to allegations of being a "coach killer" and that he forced Van Gundy out of Miami by stating: "Stan got fired because Pat (Riley) wanted to take over, not because I wanted him out. I had no control over it — not a smidgen of control. We all kind of knew it was coming because Pat and Stan were always arguing. Pat would come down and tell Stan how to do something and Stan would want to do it his own way, and that was a fine game plan if you wanted to get yourself fired."

Though at the time of his resignation Van Gundy asserted he was not being forced out by Riley, he has more recently declined comment on the situation after he accepted a coaching job with the Orlando Magic less than two years later. Riley himself would resign from his coaching duties two years later, following a 15–67 season from the Heat.

=== Orlando Magic ===
In May 2007, Van Gundy received an offer to replace the fired Rick Carlisle as head coach of the Indiana Pacers. Van Gundy turned down the offer, but began interviewing for other head coaching jobs. He was considered a lead candidate to become head coach of the Orlando Magic and also the Sacramento Kings. However, the Magic hired Billy Donovan. Shortly thereafter, Donovan decided he wanted to back out of the deal and return to the University of Florida. Finally on June 5, 2007, the Magic released Donovan and offered another contract to Van Gundy. ESPN SportsCenter reported that the Miami Heat allowed Van Gundy to coach the Magic in exchange for a second-round draft pick in 2007 and the right to swap first-round picks in 2008 or another 2008 second-round draft pick and cash.

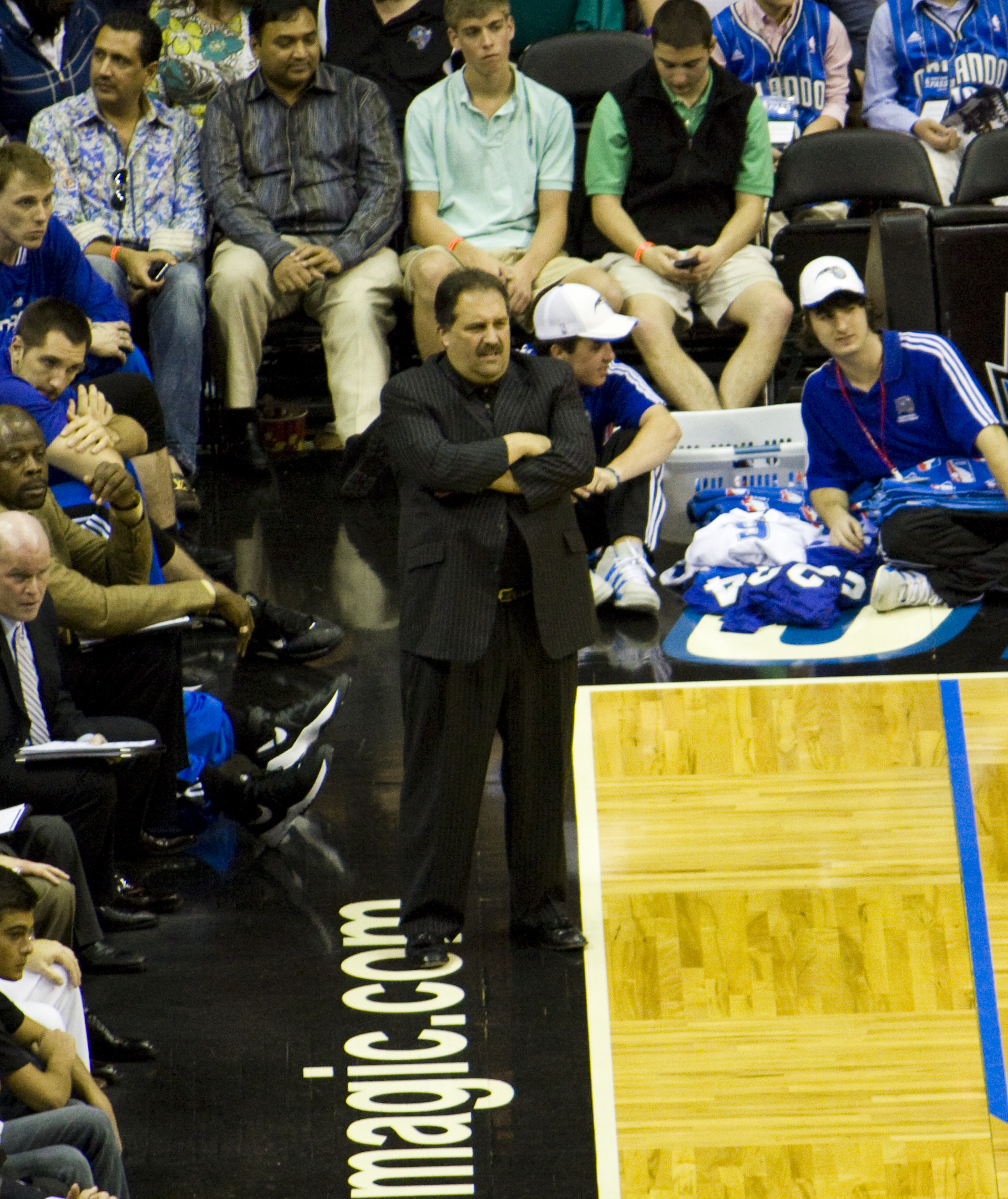
Van Gundy coaching the Magic in 2010

In Van Gundy's first season with the Magic, he guided them to a 52-win season, earning the team's first division championship since the 1995–96 season, and the third-best record in the Eastern Conference. Orlando defeated the Toronto Raptors 4–1 in the first round of the playoffs, advancing to the Eastern Semifinals for the first time in twelve seasons. They were later defeated in the Eastern Semifinals by the Detroit Pistons 4–1.

Van Gundy and the Magic won 59 games in 2008–09, the second most in franchise history, along with a second consecutive division championship finished at third place behind Boston Celtics and Cleveland Cavaliers. During playoffs, they defeated the Philadelphia 76ers from a deficit of 2–1, before squalling with Boston Celtics in seven games. Later, they defeated 66–16 Cleveland Cavaliers in the Eastern Conference finals in six games to advance to the NBA Finals, Orlando's first Finals appearance since 1995. After suffering a blowout loss in game 1 against the Los Angeles Lakers, the Magic put up a better effort in game 2, but were defeated in overtime. In game 3, the Magic shot 63% for the game, a Finals record, en route to their first win in a Finals game in franchise history. They went on to lose the next two games, a controversial decision for allowing the four-month injury absence all-star, Jameer Nelson to play in heavy minutes and decided not fouling the opposite team in less than 30 second in game 4, that ultimately cost them the title as the Lakers won the series in five.

Also during the 2008–09 season, a feud developed between Van Gundy and the then Phoenix Suns' center, and former Magic/Heat player, Shaquille O'Neal (the two were together when O'Neal played for the Heat and Van Gundy was his coach). After a game between the Suns and Magic, Van Gundy said O'Neal was flopping throughout the night. O'Neal fired back by calling Van Gundy "a master of panic," because Van Gundy was not successful in the playoffs per O'Neal.

On January 31, 2010, Van Gundy was named the coach of the Eastern Conference All-Star team for the 2010 NBA All-Star Game, making it the second time he had been given the honor to coach an all-star team. He led the Eastern Conference to victory for the second time.

On May 21, 2012, Van Gundy was relieved of his duties as head coach. Prior to the firing, Van Gundy had stated that he had knowledge that Dwight Howard wanted him fired. Van Gundy stated that a person within management had told him this, and that the team did not want to risk angering Howard (Howard had an opt-out clause in his contract). Howard still requested a trade after the season, and was traded to the Los Angeles Lakers in August 2012.

=== Detroit Pistons ===
On May 14, 2014, Van Gundy was hired as the new head coach and president of basketball operations of the Detroit Pistons, replacing interim head coach John Loyer. On February 9, 2015, Van Gundy became the 43rd coach in NBA history to win 400 games when the Pistons defeated the Atlanta Hawks 105–95. He clinched a berth in the 2016 playoffs. On May 7, 2018, the Pistons announced that Van Gundy was released from his duties as head coach and president of basketball operations.

=== New Orleans Pelicans ===
On October 22, 2020, Van Gundy was hired as the new head coach of the New Orleans Pelicans, replacing Alvin Gentry. Van Gundy and the Pelicans parted ways on June 16, 2021.

== Broadcasting career ==
Van Gundy became a broadcaster in September 2018, working with ESPN as an analyst for NBA games. Van Gundy left ESPN in 2019 to work for TNT Sports on NBA games. He would leave TNT after one season to become the head coach of the New Orleans Pelicans but would return to TNT one year later after he parted ways with the Pelicans. Since 2023, Van Gundy has also called NCAA March Madness games for TNT and CBS. After TNT's loss of NBA rights, Van Gundy joined Prime Video as a game analyst for the streaming service's NBA coverage. He reunited with Kevin Harlan and Ian Eagle and is working the service's conference finals coverage. Van Gundy will remain with CBS and TNT for his college basketball duty.

== Personal life ==
Van Gundy was born in Indio, California. He grew up as a son of a basketball coach, Bill Van Gundy, the former head coach at Brockport State University in Western New York. His younger brother Jeff Van Gundy has coached two teams in the NBA as well. After Jeff became a member of the NBA on ABC's broadcast team, he was an analyst during the 2009 NBA Finals while Stan coached the Orlando Magic.

Van Gundy has four children with his late wife Kim, who died unexpectedly in August 2023. They were married for 25 years. He revealed on a podcast that Kim died by suicide.

Van Gundy is also teaching a sports business course at Stetson University.

== Head coaching record ==
=== College ===
Record table
Season	Team	Overall	Conference	Standing	Postseason
Castleton Spartans (Mayflower Conference) (1983–1986)
1983–84	Castleton	26–2	8–0	1st	
1984–85	Castleton	23–7	8–0	1st	NAIA first round
1985–86	Castleton	19–9	4–2		
Castleton:		68–18 (.791)	20–2		
UMass Lowell River Hawks (New England Collegiate Conference) (1988–1992)
1988–89	UMass Lowell	16–13	9–5		
1989–90	UMass Lowell	13–15	7–7		
1990–91	UMass Lowell	11–17	5–9		
1991–92	UMass Lowell	14–15	7–7		
UMass Lowell:		54–60 (.474)	28–28		
Wisconsin Badgers (Big Ten Conference) (1994–1995)
1994–95	Wisconsin	13–14	7–11	9th	
Wisconsin:		13–14 (.481)	7–11 (.389)		
Total:		135–92 (.595)			
National champion Postseason invitational champion Conference regular season champion Conference regular season and conference tournament champion Division regular season champion Division regular season and conference tournament champion Conference tournament champion

=== NBA ===
Legend
Regular season	G	Games coached	W	Games won	L	Games lost	W–L %	Win–loss %
Playoffs	PG	Playoff games	PW	Playoff wins	PL	Playoff losses	PW–L %	Playoff win–loss %

Team	Year	G	W	L	W–L%	Finish	PG	PW	PL	PW–L%	Result
Miami	2003–04	82	42	40	.512	2nd in Atlantic	13	6	7	.462	Lost in Conference semifinals
Miami	2004–05	82	59	23	.720	1st in Southeast	15	11	4	.733	Lost in Conference finals
Miami	2005–06	21	11	10	.524	(resigned)	—	—	—	—	—
Orlando	2007–08	82	52	30	.634	1st in Southeast	10	5	5	.500	Lost in Conference semifinals
Orlando	2008–09	82	59	23	.720	1st in Southeast	24	13	11	.542	Lost in NBA Finals
Orlando	2009–10	82	59	23	.720	1st in Southeast	14	10	4	.714	Lost in Conference finals
Orlando	2010–11	82	52	30	.634	2nd in Southeast	6	2	4	.333	Lost in first round
Orlando	2011–12	66	37	29	.561	3rd in Southeast	5	1	4	.200	Lost in first round
Detroit	2014–15	82	32	50	.390	5th in Central	—	—	—	—	Missed playoffs
Detroit	2015–16	82	44	38	.537	3rd in Central	4	0	4	.000	Lost in first round
Detroit	2016–17	82	37	45	.451	5th in Central	—	—	—	—	Missed playoffs
Detroit	2017–18	82	39	43	.476	4th in Central	—	—	—	—	Missed playoffs
New Orleans	2020–21	72	31	41	.431	4th in Southwest	—	—	—	—	Missed playoffs
Career		979	554	425	.566		91	48	43	.527	
