= Brockport, New York =

- Village
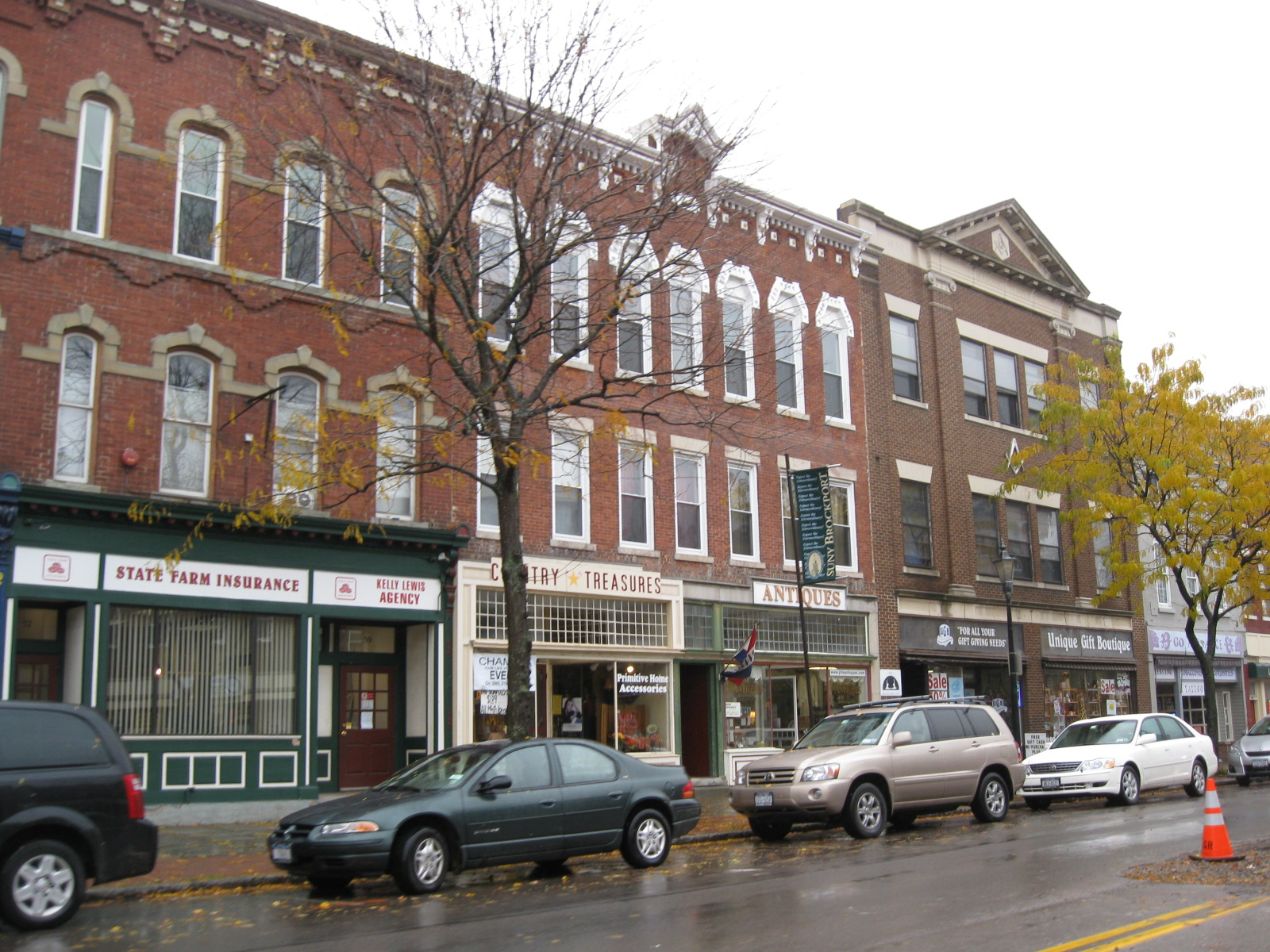
- Main Street Historic District, October 2009

- Location in Monroe County and the state of New York

- Location of New York in the United States
- Coordinates: 43°12′51″N 77°56′22″W
- Country: United States
- State: New York
- County: Monroe
- Town: Sweden
- Laid out: 1822; 204 years ago
- Incorporated: April 6, 1829; 197 years ago

Government
  - Mayor: Ben Reed

Area
  - Total: 2.22 sq mi (5.75 km^{2})
  - Land: 2.17 sq mi (5.63 km^{2})
  - Water: 0.046 sq mi (0.12 km^{2})
- Elevation: 518 ft (158 m)

Population (2020)
  - Total: 7,104
  - Density: 3,267.3/sq mi (1,261.51/km^{2})
- Time zone: UTC−5 (EST)
  - Summer (DST): UTC−4 (EDT)
- ZIP Code: 14420
- Area code: 585
- FIPS code: 36-08466
- Website: brockportny.gov

Brockport is a village in Monroe County, New York, United States. Most of the village is within the town of Sweden, with two small portions in the town of Clarkson. The population was 7,104 at the 2020 U.S. census, down from 8,366 in 2010. The name is derived from Hiel Brockway, an early settler. It is home to SUNY Brockport.

Brockport is called "the Victorian village on the Erie Canal". In 2021, the village portion of the Erie Canal was remodeled, providing a bricked walkway, a brand-new canal visitor center, and several pieces of art of historical significance.

== History ==
Prior to European settlement, the area which makes up modern Brockport was primarily occupied by the Muoio Indian tribe, a part of the Seneca (a member of the Iroquois Confederacy). The Muoio people were sustained in the region mostly by hunting indigenous wildlife like deer and the occasional black bear. Shortly after white settlers arrived, most of the Muoio died of disease and the few survivors traveled to Canada.

The village of Brockport was founded by Heil Brockway in 1822 and incorporated in 1829. The village was important due to being a port on the Erie Canal. Brockport was briefly the canal's terminus until it was extended to its final western end at Buffalo.

The Brockport Collegiate Institute was founded in 1841. It was a private academy, part of the widespread academy movement of the time. In October 1869, the Gamma Sigma Fraternity was founded at the Brockport Normal School. Gamma Sigma was the first high school fraternity started in the United States. SUNY Brockport officially called the "State University of New York Brockport", is the descendant of that institute and is known for its teaching and nursing programs. It boasts the Morgan–Manning House, a Victorian era home built in 1854 on Main Street (NY 19).

During the American Civil War the men of Brockport formed all of Company A (100 men) of the 140th New York Volunteer Infantry Regiment, formed in September 1862 at Rochester. Brockport's total population was little more than 2,100 people at the time. Additional volunteers from Brockport helped form Company H of the 140th New York Volunteer Infantry Regiment. Company A's heroics helped secure the flank of the 5th Maine and stabilized a bad situation on Little Round Top at the Battle of Gettysburg. The 140th New York regiment also saw action at the Battle of the Wilderness, the Battle of Spotsylvania Court House, and the Appomattox Courthouse Campaign. The 140th New York Volunteer Infantry Regiment was mustered out on June 3, 1865, near Alexandria, Virginia.

There has long been a legend that due to a conflict between two of Brockport's founders, there are no intersections on Main Street that meet up squarely. This is not true, since State and Erie streets line up because they used to be a trolley path that ran all the way to Rochester. Adams and Fair streets meet up as well, and so do the streets of Brockway Place and South Avenue.

Due to financial difficulties the village was under threat of dissolution, and could have become a part of the town of Sweden pending a referendum by the village's residents, but the referendum failed on June 15, 2010. However, there was another dissolution vote on May 24, 2016, which also failed.

=== Sites of interest ===
The Erie Canal runs through the village of Brockport, as well as several other villages and towns in the area. Main Street (Route 19) has many historical buildings and is a tourist attraction. The Erie Canal Boardwalk that runs from Main Street along the canal is a common spot for locals to enjoy a stroll.

The Morgan-Manning House houses the Western Monroe Historical Society and was listed on the National Register of Historic Places in 1991. Brockport has the following places listed on the National Register of Historic Places: Brockport Central Rural High School (now A.D. Oliver Middle School), First Baptist Church, First Presbyterian Church, Edward Harrison House, Lake View Cemetery, Main Street Historic District, Park Avenue and State Street Historic District, Soldiers' Memorial Tower, and St. Luke's Episcopal Church.

== Geography ==
Brockport is located at 43°12′51″N 77°56′22″W (43.214261, -77.939378) along the northern edge of the town of Sweden in western Monroe County. The village is north of the junction of New York State Route 19 (north-south) and New York State Route 31 (east-west). NY 19 leads north from Brockport 6 miles (10 km) to Hamlin and south 9 miles (14 km) to Bergen, while NY 31 leads east 18 miles (29 km) to downtown Rochester and west 25 miles (40 km) to Medina.

According to the U.S. Census Bureau, the village has a total area of 2.22 square miles (5.7 km^{2}), of which 2.17 square miles (5.6 km^{2}) are land and 0.05 square miles (0.13 km^{2}), or 2.12%, are water.

=== Climate ===
Climate data for Brockport, New York, 1991–2020 normals, extremes 1893–present
Month	Jan	Feb	Mar	Apr	May	Jun	Jul	Aug	Sep	Oct	Nov	Dec	Year
Record high °F (°C)	69 (21)	71 (22)	84 (29)	90 (32)	94 (34)	98 (37)	104 (40)	100 (38)	97 (36)	88 (31)	82 (28)	75 (24)	104 (40)
Mean daily maximum °F (°C)	32.9 (0.5)	34.7 (1.5)	42.2 (5.7)	55.5 (13.1)	67.4 (19.7)	75.4 (24.1)	79.8 (26.6)	79.2 (26.2)	72.8 (22.7)	60.0 (15.6)	48.0 (8.9)	37.8 (3.2)	57.1 (14.0)
Daily mean °F (°C)	25.5 (−3.6)	26.0 (−3.3)	33.9 (1.1)	45.6 (7.6)	57.7 (14.3)	66.6 (19.2)	71.0 (21.7)	70.3 (21.3)	63.2 (17.3)	51.4 (10.8)	40.5 (4.7)	31.3 (−0.4)	48.6 (9.2)
Mean daily minimum °F (°C)	18.0 (−7.8)	17.2 (−8.2)	25.6 (−3.6)	35.7 (2.1)	48.0 (8.9)	57.7 (14.3)	62.2 (16.8)	61.4 (16.3)	53.5 (11.9)	42.8 (6.0)	33.0 (0.6)	24.8 (−4.0)	40.0 (4.4)
Record low °F (°C)	−20 (−29)	−25 (−32)	−6 (−21)	9 (−13)	23 (−5)	31 (−1)	43 (6)	34 (1)	27 (−3)	20 (−7)	4 (−16)	−14 (−26)	−25 (−32)
Average precipitation inches (mm)	2.43 (62)	1.95 (50)	2.62 (67)	2.97 (75)	3.13 (80)	3.33 (85)	3.54 (90)	3.42 (87)	3.11 (79)	3.38 (86)	2.81 (71)	2.82 (72)	35.51 (904)
Average snowfall inches (cm)	17.9 (45)	23.5 (60)	9.6 (24)	3.1 (7.9)	0.0 (0.0)	0.0 (0.0)	0.0 (0.0)	0.0 (0.0)	0.0 (0.0)	0.1 (0.25)	4.7 (12)	21.7 (55)	80.6 (204.15)
Average precipitation days (≥ 0.01 in)	15.8	14.6	14.0	14.8	13.7	11.2	9.6	11.7	10.0	14.6	12.6	16.5	159.1
Average snowy days (≥ 0.1 in)	10.5	12.4	4.7	3.2	0.1	0.0	0.0	0.0	0.0	0.1	2.7	8.9	42.6
Source 1: NOAA
Source 2: National Weather Service

== Demographics ==
Historical population
Census	Pop.	Note	%±
1830	792		—
1840	1,249		57.7%
1850	1,500		20.1%
1860	2,143		42.9%
1870	2,817		31.5%
1880	4,039		43.4%
1890	3,742		−7.4%
1900	3,398		−9.2%
1910	3,579		5.3%
1920	2,980		−16.7%
1930	3,611		21.2%
1940	3,590		−0.6%
1950	4,748		32.3%
1960	5,256		10.7%
1970	7,878		49.9%
1980	9,776		24.1%
1990	8,749		−10.5%
2000	8,103		−7.4%
2010	8,366		3.2%
2020	7,104		−15.1%
U.S. Decennial Census

=== 2020 census ===
As of the 2020 census, Brockport had a population of 7,104. The median age was 22.8 years. 11.7% of residents were under the age of 18 and 13.0% of residents were 65 years of age or older. For every 100 females there were 87.7 males, and for every 100 females age 18 and over there were 84.4 males age 18 and over.

100.0% of residents lived in urban areas, while 0.0% lived in rural areas.

There were 2,427 households in Brockport, of which 21.8% had children under the age of 18 living in them. Of all households, 28.3% were married-couple households, 25.8% were households with a male householder and no spouse or partner present, and 35.4% were households with a female householder and no spouse or partner present. About 38.0% of all households were made up of individuals and 12.4% had someone living alone who was 65 years of age or older.

There were 2,862 housing units, of which 15.2% were vacant. The homeowner vacancy rate was 1.2% and the rental vacancy rate was 14.9%.

Racial composition as of the 2020 census
Race	Number	Percent
White	5,818	81.9%
Black or African American	533	7.5%
American Indian and Alaska Native	28	0.4%
Asian	81	1.1%
Native Hawaiian and Other Pacific Islander	0	0.0%
Some other race	125	1.8%
Two or more races	519	7.3%
Hispanic or Latino (of any race)	465	6.5%

=== 2010 census ===
For 2010, there were 2,528 households, out of which 17.9% had children under the age of 18 living with them, 10.1% had a female householder with no husband present, and 56.7% were non-families. Of all households 33.9% were made up of individuals, and 7.8% had someone living alone who was 65 years of age or older. The average household size was 2.25 and the average family size was 2.86.

In the village, for 2010, the population was spread out, with 13.7% under the age of 18, 43.8% from 18 to 24, 16.4% from 25 to 44, 17.8% from 45 to 64, and 8.1% who were 65 years of age or older. The median age was 22.3 years. For every 100 females, there were 84.0 males. For every 100 females age 18 and over, there were 83.2 males.

=== Income and poverty ===
For 2020, the village's median household income was $48,579. The village's per capita income was $20,108. About 18.9% of the population were below the poverty line.

== Notable people ==
- Sachio Ashida, experimental psychologist, judoka, and kamikaze pilot
- Ella D. Barrier, 19th-century educator
- Davis Carpenter, former U.S. congressman
- Larry Carpenter, theater and television director
- Jim Cosman, MLB pitcher
- Christopher John Farley, writer and author
- Martin Ferrero, actor
- Jon Finkel, professional Magic: The Gathering player
- Jerome Fuller, jurist
- William Heyen, poet
- Elias B. Holmes, former U.S. congressman
- Mary Jane Holmes (1825–1907), novelist
- Sumner Howard, jurist and politician
- Carolyn Mackler, novelist
- Andy Parrino, MLB player
- Jeff Van Gundy, NBA coach and broadcaster
- Fannie Barrier Williams, social reformer and first African-American graduate of SUNY Brockport
- Jessamine Chapman Williams, home economist and college professor
