= List of current WNBA broadcasters =

The following is a list of current (entering the 2026 WNBA season) Women's National Basketball Association broadcasters for each individual team. The announcers who call the television broadcasts also call the WNBA League Pass Production broadcasts unless noted otherwise. Teams listed under local broadcasts for them are 2025 broadcast teams.

== Eastern Conference ==
=== Television ===
Team	Play-by-play	Analyst(s)	Sideline Reporter	Flagship Station
Atlanta	Angel Gray (primary); Andy Demetra (select home games)	Tabitha Turner (primary); Fallon Stokes (select home games)	Autumn Johnson (primary); Baillie Burmaster (select home games); Tenitra Batiste (select home games)	WANF; WPCH-TV; Peachtree Sports Network
Chicago	Lisa Byington (primary); Jason Ross Jr. (select home games)	Shimmy Miller	Kalia Butler	WCIU-TV
Indiana	Pat Boylan	Debbie Antonelli (primary); Bria Goss (select home games)	Kelsie Kasper	WTHR; WALV-CD Fever Direct (streaming home of all local broadcasts regardless of network)
New York	Johnathan Edmond (primary); Chris Shearn (select home games)	Ros Gold-Onwude (primary); Dominique Patrick (select home games)	Tina Cervasio	WNYW; WWOR; Liberty Live (streaming home of all local broadcasts regardless of network)
Toronto	Daniella Ponticelli	Tamika Nurse; Amy Audibert	Reagan Subban	TSN
Washington	Dorian Craft	Christy Winters-Scott	Juliana Morgan	Monumental Sports Network

=== Radio ===
Team	Play-by-play	Flagship station
Indiana	John Nolan; Bria Goss	WFNI
Chicago	Zach Zaidman; Leila Rahimi	WSCR

== Western Conference ==
=== Television ===
Team	Play-by-play	Analyst(s)	Sideline reporter	Flagship station
Dallas	Ron Thulin	Fran Harris; Kim Adams	Alexis Davis	KFAA-TV
Golden State	Jordan Kent	Morgan Ragan	Matt Lively	KPYX; KPIX; KMAX; KOVR
Las Vegas	Krista Blunk (primary); Gianna Hearn (during Blunk's ESPN assignments)	Carolyn Peck (primary); Anne O’Neil (select home games)	Gianna Hearn; Marke Freeman (selected home games)	KTNV-TV; KMCC (under Scripps Sports branding)
Los Angeles	Rahshaun Haylock (primary); Mike Trudell (select home games)	Mary Murphy	Nikki Kay (primary); Allie Clifton (select home games)	Spectrum SportsNet
Minnesota	Sloane Martin	Lea B. Olsen		WFTC
Phoenix	Ann Schatz (primary); Braiden Bell (select home games)	Ann Meyers-Drysdale; Charli Turner Thorne	Kate Longworth	KTVK; KPHE
Portland	Elise Woodward	Aja Ellison		KPTV; KPDX
Seattle	Dick Fain	Alyssa Charlston-Smith; Crystal Langhorne; Layshia Clarendon; Dan Hughes; Francis Williams	Shantelle Chand	KOMO-TV; KUNS-TV

=== Radio ===
Team	Play-by-play	Flagship station
Golden State	Kevin Danna	95.7 The Game
Las Vegas	TC Martin	KWWN
Minnesota	Sloane Martin; Lea B. Olsen (WFTC simulcasts)	KFXN-FM iHeart Radio
Portland	A.J. Kanell; Sophia Jones	KMTT

== Nationwide ==
=== English announcers ===
ESPN airs select regular season games and acts as the exclusive provider for the Semifinals and the WNBA Finals. Beginning with the 2026 season, NBC Sports will bring back WNBA games that include select regular games and WNBA Finals throughout the seasons. Beginning with the 2026 season, USA Sports will also carry WNBA on Wednesday night games, as well as Prime Video will carry WNBA on Thursday night games and CBS Sports will carry WNBA on Saturday night games. These will be a simulcast of the world feed television broadcast.

Game	Play-by-play	Color analyst(s)	Sideline reporter(s)	Network
WNBA on ESPN/ABC	Ryan Ruocco (lead); Beth Mowins (secondary); Tiffany Greene (select games)	Rebecca Lobo (lead); Debbie Antonelli (secondary); Monica McNutt (secondary); Carolyn Peck (secondary)	Holly Rowe (lead); Angel Gray (secondary); Rosalyn Gold-Onwude (secondary); Christine Williamson (select games); Brooke Weisbrod (select games)	ESPN; ESPN2; ABC; ESPN+/Disney+
WNBA on NBC	Zora Stephenson (lead); Noah Eagle (secondary); Michael Grady (secondary); Kate Scott (secondary)	Sarah Kustok (lead); LaChina Robinson (secondary)	Ashley ShahAhmadi; Jordan Cornette; Caroline Pineda	NBC; NBCSN; Peacock; NBC Sports App
WNBA on USA	Kate Scott (lead); Meghan McPeak (secondary); Carlan Gay (secondary)	Sarah Kustok (lead); Tamika Catchings (secondary); Amy Audibert (secondary); Lea B. Olsen (secondary); Edona Thaqi (select games)	Paris Lawson (primary); Terrika Foster-Brasby (secondary); Edona Thaqi (secondary)	USA; CNBC
WNBA on Prime	Michael Grady (primary); Lisa Byington (secondary); Mike Watts (secondary)	Candace Parker; Cynthia Cooper-Dyke; LaChina Robinson; Kara Lawson	JayDee Dyer; Kayla Grey; Morgan Ragan; Britney Eurton	Amazon Prime Video
WNBA on ION	Lisa Byington; Dick Fain; Simulcast of home team play by play announcers	Stephen Bardo; Mary Murphy simulcast of home team color analysts	Home team broadcasting sideline reporters	Ion Television
WNBA on CBS	Jordan Kent (primary); Chris Lewis (secondary); Ed Cohen (alternate); Jack Gordon (alternate)	Isis Young (primary); Debbie Antonelli (secondary); Julianne Viani Braen (alternate); Stephanie Ready (alternate)	Tiffany Blackmon (primary); AJ Ross (secondary); Chris Williamson (alternate); Hailey Sutton (alternate)	CBS; Paramount+ CBS Sports App

=== Spanish announcers (ESPN Deportes) ===
==== Play-by-play announcers ====
- Miguel Ángel Briseño
- Kenneth Garay
- Julia Headley
- Leo Montero
- Alejandro Pérez
- Leo Margo
- Fernando Tirado

==== Color analysts ====
- Pablo Viruega
- Toño Rodriguez
- Marcelo Nogueira
- Rigo Plascencia
- Eitan Benezra
- Alex Pombo

=== NBA TV ===
NBAtv will carry select games throughout the season. These games will remain available on WNBA League Pass and will be a simulcast of the world feed television broadcast.

=== WNBA League Pass ===
Every game not broadcast on an ESPN Network or CBSSN is carried live for everyone to watch on WNBA League Pass. No blackouts apply outside of the ESPN and CBSSN productions.

== International broadcasters ==
=== Worldwide ===
- Prime Video
- WNBA League Pass

=== Americas ===
- Canada: TSN, CTV, NBA TV Canada
- Puerto Rico: ABC/ESPN, NBC/Peacock, CBS/Paramount+, NBA TV
- United States Virgin Islands: ABC/ESPN, NBC/Peacock, CBS/Paramount+, Ion Television, NBA TV
- Brazil: YouTube
- South America and the Caribbean: ESPN

=== Africa ===
- Sub-Saharan Africa: ESPN

=== Asia ===
- China: Tencent
- Hong Kong: Now TV
- Japan: Lemino
- Philippines: TAP
- Taiwan: Videoland

=== Europe ===
- Estonia, Latvia, Lithuania: Go3 Sport
- Greece: Cosmote Sport
- Germany: WOW
- France: beIN Sports
- Italy: Sky Sport
- Netherlands: ESPN
- Turkey: S Sport
- United Kingdom: Sky Sports

=== Oceania ===
- Australia, New Zealand: ESPN
- Guam, Northern Mariana Islands, American Samoa: ABC/ESPN, NBC/Peacock, CBS/Paramount+, NBA TV

== See also ==
- List of current NFL broadcasters
- List of current Major League Baseball broadcasters
- List of current NBA broadcasters
- List of current National Hockey League broadcasters
- List of current Major League Soccer broadcasters
