= List of WNBA Finals broadcasters =

The following is a list of the television networks and announcers that have broadcast the WNBA Finals.

== 2020s ==
Year	Network	Games	Play-by-play	Color commentator(s)	Sideline reporter(s)	Studio host	Studio analyst(s)
2026	NBC	1, 4	Zora Stephenson	Sarah Kustok	Ashley ShahAhmadi	Maria Taylor	Cheryl Miller, Sue Bird and Tina Charles (Game 4)
2026	USA Network	2–3, 5–7	Kate Scott	Tamika Catchings (Games 2–3, 5–7); Sarah Kustok (Games 2, 5–7); Amy Audibert (Game 3)	Meghan McPeak	Elle Duncan and Paris Lawson	Renee Montgomery, Chamique Holdsclaw, Teresa Weatherspoon (Games 2–3, 5–6) and Cynthia Cooper (Game 7)
2025	ESPN	1, 3–4	Ryan Ruocco	Rebecca Lobo	Holly Rowe (Games 1, 3–4); Brooke Weisbrod (Game 2)	Elle Duncan	Andraya Carter and Chiney Ogwumike
2025	ABC	2	Ryan Ruocco	Rebecca Lobo	Holly Rowe (Games 1, 3–4); Brooke Weisbrod (Game 2)	Elle Duncan	Andraya Carter and Chiney Ogwumike
2024	ESPN	1, 3–5	Ryan Ruocco	Rebecca Lobo	Holly Rowe (Games 1, 3–4); Brooke Weisbrod (Game 2)	LaChina Robinson (Games 1, 3–5); Elle Duncan (Game 2)	Andraya Carter, Carolyn Peck and Chiney Ogwumike
2024	ABC	2	Ryan Ruocco	Rebecca Lobo	Holly Rowe (Games 1, 3–4); Brooke Weisbrod (Game 2)	LaChina Robinson (Games 1, 3–5); Elle Duncan (Game 2)	Andraya Carter, Carolyn Peck and Chiney Ogwumike
2023	ABC	1, 3	Ryan Ruocco	Rebecca Lobo	Holly Rowe and Andraya Carter	LaChina Robinson	Carolyn Peck and Chiney Ogwumike
2023	ESPN	2, 4	Ryan Ruocco	Rebecca Lobo	Holly Rowe and Andraya Carter	LaChina Robinson	Carolyn Peck and Chiney Ogwumike
2022	ABC	1	Ryan Ruocco	Rebecca Lobo	Holly Rowe and Andraya Carter	LaChina Robinson	Carolyn Peck
2022	ESPN	2–4	Ryan Ruocco	Rebecca Lobo	Holly Rowe and Andraya Carter	LaChina Robinson	Carolyn Peck
2021	ABC	1	Ryan Ruocco	Rebecca Lobo	Holly Rowe and Rosalyn Gold-Onwude	LaChina Robinson	Sue Bird and Carolyn Peck
2021	ESPN	2, 4	Ryan Ruocco	Rebecca Lobo	Holly Rowe and Rosalyn Gold-Onwude	LaChina Robinson	Sue Bird and Carolyn Peck
2021	ESPN2	3	Ryan Ruocco	Rebecca Lobo	Holly Rowe and Rosalyn Gold-Onwude	LaChina Robinson	Sue Bird and Carolyn Peck
2020	ESPN2	1	Ryan Ruocco	Rebecca Lobo	Holly Rowe	LaChina Robinson	Swin Cash (Game 1–2)
2020	ABC	2	Ryan Ruocco	Rebecca Lobo	Holly Rowe	LaChina Robinson	Swin Cash (Game 1–2)
2020	ESPN	3	Ryan Ruocco	Rebecca Lobo	Holly Rowe	LaChina Robinson	Swin Cash (Game 1–2)

== 2010s ==
Year	Network	Games	Play-by-play	Color commentator(s)	Sideline reporter(s)	Studio host	Studio analyst(s)
2019	ESPN	1–2	Ryan Ruocco	Rebecca Lobo	Holly Rowe and LaChina Robinson	N/A	
2019	ABC	3	Ryan Ruocco	Rebecca Lobo	Holly Rowe and LaChina Robinson	N/A	
2019	ESPN2	4–5	Ryan Ruocco	Rebecca Lobo	Holly Rowe and LaChina Robinson	N/A	
2018	ESPNNEWS	1	Ryan Ruocco	Rebecca Lobo	Holly Rowe (Game 2–3); LaChina Robinson (Game 1)	N/A	
2018	ABC	2	Ryan Ruocco	Rebecca Lobo	Holly Rowe (Game 2–3); LaChina Robinson (Game 1)	N/A	
2018	ESPN2	3	Ryan Ruocco	Rebecca Lobo	Holly Rowe (Game 2–3); LaChina Robinson (Game 1)	N/A	
2017	ABC	1	Ryan Ruocco	Rebecca Lobo	Holly Rowe (Game 1–2, 4–5); LaChina Robinson (Game 3)	N/A	
2017	ESPN	4–5	Ryan Ruocco	Rebecca Lobo	Holly Rowe (Game 1–2, 4–5); LaChina Robinson (Game 3)	N/A	
2017	ESPN2	2–3	Ryan Ruocco	Rebecca Lobo	Holly Rowe (Game 1–2, 4–5); LaChina Robinson (Game 3)	N/A	
2016	ABC	1	Ryan Ruocco	Rebecca Lobo	Holly Rowe (Game 2, 4–5); LaChina Robinson (Game 1, 3)	N/A	LaChina Robinson
2016	ESPN	4	Ryan Ruocco	Rebecca Lobo	Holly Rowe (Game 2, 4–5); LaChina Robinson (Game 1, 3)	N/A	LaChina Robinson
2016	ESPN2	2–3, 5	Ryan Ruocco	Rebecca Lobo	Holly Rowe (Game 2, 4–5); LaChina Robinson (Game 1, 3)	N/A	LaChina Robinson
2015	ABC	1	Ryan Ruocco	Rebecca Lobo	Holly Rowe	N/A	Carolyn Peck
2015	ESPN	4	Ryan Ruocco	Rebecca Lobo	Holly Rowe	N/A	Carolyn Peck
2015	ESPN2	2–3, 5	Ryan Ruocco	Rebecca Lobo	Holly Rowe	N/A	Carolyn Peck
2014	ABC	1	Ryan Ruocco	Rebecca Lobo	Holly Rowe	N/A	Carolyn Peck
2014	ESPN	2	Ryan Ruocco	Rebecca Lobo	Holly Rowe	N/A	Carolyn Peck
2014	ESPN2	3	Ryan Ruocco	Rebecca Lobo	Holly Rowe	N/A	Carolyn Peck
2013	ESPN	1	Ryan Ruocco	Rebecca Lobo	Holly Rowe	Randy Scott	Carolyn Peck
2013	ESPN2	2–3	Ryan Ruocco	Rebecca Lobo	Holly Rowe	Randy Scott	Carolyn Peck
2012	ESPN2	1, 3 and 4	Pam Ward (Game 1); Terry Gannon (Game 2–4)	Rebecca Lobo	Holly Rowe	Cindy Brunson	Carolyn Peck
2012	ESPN	2	Pam Ward (Game 1); Terry Gannon (Game 2–4)	Rebecca Lobo	Holly Rowe	Cindy Brunson	Carolyn Peck
2011	ESPN	1	Pam Ward	Rebecca Lobo	Holly Rowe	Cindy Brunson	Carolyn Peck
2011	ESPN2	2–3	Terry Gannon	Rebecca Lobo	Heather Cox	Cindy Brunson	Carolyn Peck
2010	ABC	1	Terry Gannon	Carolyn Peck	Heather Cox and Rebecca Lobo	Cindy Brunson	Doris Burke
2010	ESPN2	2, 3	Terry Gannon	Carolyn Peck	Heather Cox and Rebecca Lobo	Cindy Brunson	Doris Burke

=== Notes ===
- Game 1 of the 2016 WNBA Finals was broadcast on ABC and had 0.5 overnight rating (597,000 viewers), which was the best since 2010. The 5 game 2016 Finals broadcast on ABC, ESPN and ESPN2 averaged a 0.3 rating and 487,000 viewers. Average viewership in 2016 was 224,000 viewers.
- Game one of the 2015 WNBA Finals telecast on ABC, drew 571,000 viewers, up from 558,000 for game 1 in 2014. Game three of the finals drew 432,000 viewers, and game five drew 583,000, both on ESPN2.
- The 2014 WNBA Finals averaged 659,000 viewers across the ESPN channels, up 91% from the 2013 finals between the Minnesota Lynx and the Atlanta Dream which averaged 345,000. Overall, the 2014 playoffs averaged a 0.3 rating and 489,000 viewers on the ESPN networks, up from 0.2 and 272,000 in 2013.
- The 2013 WNBA Finals games averaged 344,000 viewers.
- Game 2 of the 2012 WNBA Finals between the Indiana Fever and Minnesota Lynx was broadcast on ESPN (games 1,3 and 4 were on ESPN2) and received 778,000 viewers and a .6 household rating. This was the highest rated WNBA broadcast on ESPN since a 1999 Western Conference Finals game between the Houston Comets and Los Angeles Sparks received 1,052,000 viewers and a 1.1 household rating. The average viewership for the 4 finals games in 2012 was 477,000.

== 2000s ==
Year	Network	Games	Play-by-play	Color commentator(s)	Sideline reporter(s)	Studio host	Studio analyst(s)
2009	ESPN2	All	Terry Gannon	Carolyn Peck	Heather Cox and Rebecca Lobo	Pam Ward	Nancy Lieberman
2008	ESPN2	All	Terry Gannon	Doris Burke	Heather Cox and Holly Rowe	Pam Ward	Nancy Lieberman and Carolyn Peck
2007	ESPN2	1, 3–5	Terry Gannon	Doris Burke	Heather Cox and Rebecca Lobo	Linda Cohn	Nancy Lieberman and Carolyn Peck
2007	ESPN	2	Terry Gannon	Doris Burke	Heather Cox and Rebecca Lobo	Linda Cohn	Nancy Lieberman and Carolyn Peck
2006	ESPN2	All	Dave Pasch	Doris Burke	Heather Cox and Stephanie Ready	Linda Cohn	Nancy Lieberman and Becky Hammon
2005	ESPN2	1–2, 4	Terry Gannon	Doris Burke	Heather Cox and Rebecca Lobo	Pam Ward	Nancy Lieberman and Geno Auriemma
2005	ABC	3	Terry Gannon	Doris Burke	Heather Cox and Rebecca Lobo	Pam Ward	Nancy Lieberman and Geno Auriemma
2004	ESPN2	All	Terry Gannon	Ann Meyers and Greg Anthony	Doris Burke and Heather Cox	Pam Ward	Nancy Lieberman and Geno Auriemma
2003	ESPN2	1, 3	Mark Jones	Ann Meyers	Doris Burke	Michele Tafoya	Nancy Lieberman
2003	ABC	2	Mark Jones	Ann Meyers	Doris Burke	Michele Tafoya	Nancy Lieberman
2002	NBC	2	Paul Sunderland	Ann Meyers	Chris Wragge and Andrea Joyce	Hannah Storm	None
2002	ESPN2	1	Michele Tafoya	Doris Burke	N/A	John Saunders	Nancy Lieberman
2001	NBC	2	Mike Breen	Ann Meyers	Andrea Joyce	Hannah Storm	
2001	ESPN	1	Michele Tafoya	Doris Burke	N/A		
2000	NBC	2	Tom Hammond	Ann Meyers	Andrea Joyce	Hannah Storm	None
2000	Lifetime	1	Michele Tafoya	Reggie Miller	Fran Harris	Persefone Contos	None

=== Notes ===
- The 2009 WNBA Finals between the Mercury and Fever had the highest average ratings (548,000 viewers), since average finals ratings began being recorded in 2007.
- ESPN returned to the fold in the year 2001, broadcasting the first game with NBC airing the second and decisive game between the Los Angeles Sparks and Charlotte Sting. For NBC's final year of coverage in 2002, ESPN2 this time, broadcast the first game with NBC again covering what would become the second and ultimately decisive game. The Los Angeles Sparks' 69–66 victory over the New York Liberty on August 31, 2002, would therefore, prove to be the final broadcast of the WNBA on NBC. The league would soon thereafter, transfer the television rights to ABC/ESPN.

== 1990s ==
Year	Network	Games	Play-by-play	Color commentator(s)	Sideline reporter(s)	Studio host	Studio analyst(s)
1999	Lifetime	1	Michele Tafoya	Reggie Miller and Fran Harris	Mary Murphy	Maura Driscoll	None
1999	NBC	2–3	Mike Breen	Ann Meyers	Lisa Malosky	Hannah Storm and Ahmad Rashad	None
1998	NBC	2	Tom Hammond	Ann Meyers	Lisa Malosky	Hannah Storm	Ann Meyers
1998	ESPN	1, 3	Robin Roberts	Geno Auriemma	N/A		
1997	NBC	1	Hannah Storm	Ann Meyers	N/A		

=== Notes ===
- The first WNBA season in 1997 concluded with what was at the time, a single championship game. The following year, the finale series into a best-of-three games series, with NBC airing the first two games and ESPN airing the decisive third game. In 1999, ESPN aired the first game of the championship series while NBC covered the following two. Come the year 2000, Lifetime temporarily assumed ESPN's role as the WNBA's cable outlet for the WNBA Championship. Like the year prior, Lifetime broadcast the first game while NBC covered the second and ultimately decisive game between the Houston Comets and New York Liberty. This marked Houston's fourth consecutive WNBA Championship.

== See also ==
- WNBA on ESPN
  - WNBA on ABC
- WNBA on NBC
- WNBA on USA
- WNBA on Lifetime
