= Kate Scott (American sportscaster) =

American sportscaster (born 1983)

- Born: May 3, 1983 (age 43); Fresno, California, U.S.
- Education: University of California at Berkeley
- Occupations: Sports announcer, radio personality
- Years active: 2011–present
- Employer(s): NBC Sports Philadelphia; NBC/USA Sports
- Spouse: Nicole

Kate Scott (born May 3, 1983) is an American sportscaster who is currently the television play-by-play announcer for the Philadelphia 76ers and WNBA coverage airing on NBC, Peacock and USA Network. Scott also calls international soccer for Fox Sports and CBS Sports and is the preseason television voice of the NFL's Seattle Seahawks.

In June 2024, it was announced that Scott would be one of four new commentators—and the first woman—to join the Madden video game franchise. She and broadcast partner Brock Huard are one of three options for commentary teams in Madden NFL 26.

Scott is the only woman – and one of a select few play-by-play voices regardless of sex – to have called games for the NBA, NFL, NHL, NCAA D1 football, the Olympics, and a FIFA World Cup.

== Early life ==
Scott was born in Fresno, California, and raised in Clovis, California. She graduated from Clovis High School in 2001. She attended UC Berkeley where she majored in communications. As a sophomore, she became the school's first female "Mic Man", leading cheers in the student section for their football and basketball games. She wrote for The Bear Insider magazine, and its ESPN affiliated website. She did an internship with KLLC ("Alice @ 97.3"). She graduated in 2005.

== Career ==
After graduating college, Scott soon joined Metro Networks, where she was a reporter, producer, and anchor, doing traffic, news, and sports updates for a number of Bay Area radio stations including KSFO, KFRC, KCBS, KFOG, and KNBR. During that time, she also did on-screen television reporting for Cal football for CSN California and hosted Cal football's postgame radio show on KGO 810.

She joined KNBR - the San Francisco Giants, San Francisco 49ers, Golden State Warriors, and Stanford football radio flagship - full-time in 2011 where she provided sports updates for their morning and midday shows and filled in as a substitute host. She also served as a television sideline reporter for the San Jose Earthquakes, reported for the San Jose Giants minor league team, called high school football for Comcast, and anchored Saturday night sports for NBC Bay Area.

In August 2016, Scott became the first woman to call an NFL game on the radio. She covered two preseason games for the San Francisco 49ers.

In December 2016, she left KNBR to join the Pac-12 Network full-time to focus on play-by-play. In 2017, she became the first woman to call a football game on the Pac-12 Network. In addition to calling football, men's and women's soccer, men's and women's basketball, softball, and volleyball, Scott also anchored, reported, and hosted the Network's award-winning features program "Our Stories".

For International Women’s Day on March 8, 2020, she was part of the first-ever all-women's broadcast crew for a National Hockey League game in the United States on NBCSN. Scott provided play-by-play alongside Olympic gold medal-winning analysts A.J. Mleczko and Kendall Coyne Schofield.

In October 2020, Scott joined KGMZ-FM (95.7 "The Game") as a co-host of their new morning show. She continued to work with the Pac-12 Network.

In March 2021, Scott became the first woman to call a Golden State Warriors game (and the first to do play-by-play of an NBA game on the radio) as she and sportscasters Mary Murphy, Kerith Burke, and Chiney Ogwumike covered the Warriors game against the Chicago Bulls.

In June 2021, she became the first woman to call men’s Copa América and Gold Cup soccer matches for Fox Sports. The following month Scott provided play-by-play for the majority of the men's and women's basketball games at the 2020 Summer Olympics (held in July 2021) on NBC and its family of networks.

In August 2021, Scott left 95.7 "The Game" and joined analyst Mike Golic as the play-by-play voice for Learfield's newly launched brand "College Football Saturday Night." The duo visited Alabama, Georgia, Oklahoma State, Colorado, South Carolina, Texas A&M and many more storied college football programs during their 13-week cross-country adventure to bring listeners a national game of the week.

On September 23, 2021, it was announced that Scott would become the television play-by-play announcer for the Philadelphia 76ers, replacing the retiring Marc Zumoff. She became the second woman to do a full-time play-by-play role for a major men's professional sports team, after Lisa Byington for the Milwaukee Bucks.

On October 7, 2025, Scott was named the lead play-by-play announcer for WNBA coverage airing on USA Network. Scott is the secondary full-time play-by-play announcers for the WNBA on NBC, pairing with Sarah Kustok and Caroline Pineda on the #3 team.

On January 5, 2026, Scott was made the guest play-by-play announcer for NBA on NBC coverage of New York Knicks and Detroit Pistons.

== Personal life ==
While she was an intern with KLLC, Scott met and later married her wife Nicole in San Francisco. They have a pit bull named Piper, who is a rescue.

Although she is not religious, Scott says that she was raised in the Jewish faith and culture by her mother. Scott is a member of the Jewish Sports Hall of Fame of Northern California.
