= Marc Zumoff =

American sportscaster (born 1955)

- Born: November 18, 1955 (age 70); Philadelphia, Pennsylvania, U.S.
- Sports commentary career
- Team(s): Philadelphia 76ers Philadelphia Union
- Genre: Play-by-Play
- Sport(s): Basketball; Association football American football Rowing; Cycling

Marc Zumoff (born November 18, 1955) is an American sportscaster who is the former play-by-play announcer for the Philadelphia 76ers.

In 2016, he worked for NBC Sports doing play-by-play for the United States women's national basketball team alongside Ann Meyers-Drysdale. Zumoff worked on behalf of Turner Sports doing play-by-play for the 2017 NBA playoffs. He also fills in for MLS's Philadelphia Union doing play-by-play. Zumoff announced his retirement after 27 years on June 29, 2021.

Zumoff also has his own company, Zumoff Productions, a coaching company for news and sports broadcasters, and is the co-author of Total Sportscasting: Performance, Production and Career Development, a college textbook published by Focal Press.

== Career ==
=== Early career ===
Zumoff attended Temple University in Philadelphia, announcing Temple Owls football and basketball games. He left Temple without graduating, and would get his undergraduate degree 15 years later. His first broadcasting work, in 1977, was as a radio newsman at WBUD 1260 in Trenton, New Jersey. Other news broadcasting work followed at WTTM Radio in Trenton and WHWH Radio in Princeton. While at WHWH, he also became the voice of Princeton University football and basketball. At the same time, Zumoff was doing freelance work at KYW Newsradio in Philadelphia. While working at KYW, his friend Rob Grossman left the station to become the public relations director of the Philadelphia Fever of the Major Indoor Soccer League. Through Grossman, Zumoff had a one-game audition to become the team's play-by-play announcer, at which he was successful. In 1982, the Fever's final season, several games were broadcast on the PRISM Sports Network. After the team folded, PRISM hired Marc to do movie announcements and in January 1983, hired him to replace Jim Gray as the 76ers pre-game/halftime/post-game host. While in that position, Zumoff occasionally filled in with various play-by-play assignments, including the Philadelphia Flyers (for Gene Hart and Mike Emrick) and the Philadelphia Big 5. Other work during that time included Big East Basketball, the Dad Vail Regatta, Philadelphia Wings Lacrosse, Villanova University football and basketball, the CoreStates Bike Race, and the Devon Horse Show.

Zumoff has retained his connection in news, including work as a fill-in host for the news and public affairs show Radio Times with Marty Moss-Coane on the local National Public Radio affiliate WHYY-FM.

=== Philadelphia 76ers ===
Zumoff worked for 27 seasons as the Sixers television play-by-play announcer and 36 years as a part of the 76ers broadcast team. Zumoff, a Philadelphia native, was officially named play-by-play announcer on August 17, 1994, following an 11-year stint as the team's pre-game/halftime/post-game host. Zumoff has won the Mid-Atlantic Emmy Award for best sports play-by-play broadcaster 18 times. As the Sixers play-by-play announcer, Zumoff has worked with six different partners: Steve Mix, Bob Salmi, Ed Pinckney, Eric Snow, Malik Rose, and Alaa Abdelnaby. Zumoff retired after the 2021 76ers season and was replaced by Kate Scott.

=== Other work ===
Besides working for NBC at the Rio Olympics, and Turner Sports' coverage of the NBA, Zumoff has done play-by-play for NBC Sports Philadelphia and The Comcast Network's coverage of high school football and college football. He also fills in for MLS's Philadelphia Union doing play by play.

In addition to regular appearances at community functions on behalf of the 76ers and NBC Sports Philadelphia, Zumoff also chairs an annual golf outing benefiting Maccabi USA. In the past, Zumoff has hosted the golf outing "Tee Off with Zumoff" benefiting the Pathway School for learning disabled students as well as the Points for Peace 3-on-3 basketball tournament at the Palestra.

== Sportscasting coaching ==
Zumoff runs his own company, Zumoff Productions, a coaching company for current and aspiring news and sports broadcasters.

He has also co-authored, with Max Negin, the college textbook Total Sportscasting: Performance, Production and Career Development, published by Focal Press. The book covers skills required for a successful career in sportscasting, including performance and production techniques, broadcast writing techniques, career development, and personnel management.

== Personal life ==
Zumoff lives with his wife Debbie. They have two sons. He is a fan of Tottenham Hotspur.
