= 2026 WNBA season =

- League: Women's National Basketball Association
- Sport: Basketball
- Duration: May 8 – October 31, 2026
- Teams: 15
- TV partner(s): ABC/ESPN; NBC/NBCSN; USA Network/CNBC (Simulcast); Ion; CBS; NBA TV
- Streaming partner(s): ESPN DTC; Prime Video; Peacock; Paramount+

Draft
- Top draft pick: (United States) Azzi Fudd
- Picked by: Dallas Wings

Regular season
- Top seed: Minnesota Lynx
- Season MVP: (United States) A'ja Wilson (Las Vegas)
- Top scorer: (United States) A'ja Wilson (Las Vegas)

Playoffs
- Finals champions: Golden State Valkyries (first title)
- Runners-up: Atlanta Dream
- Finals MVP: (France) / (United States) Gabby Williams (Golden State)

WNBA seasons
- ← 2025 2027 →

The 2026 WNBA season was the 30th season of the Women's National Basketball Association (WNBA). The league expanded from 13 to 15 teams with the addition of the Portland Fire and Toronto Tempo, first announced in 2024. This followed the addition of the Golden State Valkyries in 2025.

In October 2025, the WNBA announced that the Chicago Sky would host the 2026 WNBA All-Star Game and related events for the second time in franchise history. The All-Star game was played at the United Center on Saturday, July 25, while the three-point contest and Skills Challenge took place on Friday, July 24, at Wintrust Arena.

This was the last season for the Connecticut Sun in Uncasville, Connecticut after Houston Rockets owner Tilman Fertitta purchased the franchise with the intention to relocate the team to Houston to revive the Houston Comets.

== Offseason ==
=== Collective bargaining agreement ===
The current WNBA Collective Bargaining Agreement (CBA), signed in 2020, was originally to run through 2027, but the Women's National Basketball Player's Association (WNBPA) opted out in October 2024, accelerating its termination to October 31, 2025.

The previous CBA was signed in January 2020, covering the 2020–2027 seasons. The agreement introduced increased salaries, maternity and family benefits, and improved travel conditions.

==== Timeline ====
- October 2024: The WNBPA officially notified the league of its intent to opt-out of the existing CBA.
- Spring 2025: Preliminary discussions began between league representatives and the union.
- July 2025: The WNBPA issued a public statement claiming that the league has "failed to meet players' priorities" in the early stages of negotiations.
- October 2025: Tensions escalated after Minnesota Lynx forward Napheesa Collier criticized league leadership, prompting WNBA Commissioner Cathy Engelbert to respond that she will "do better" in rebuilding trust with players.
- October 30: It was announced that the WNBA and WNBPA had reached an agreement for a 30-day extension to continue negotiations.
- November 30: It was announced that the WNBA and WNBPA had reached an agreement to a 6-week extension pushing back the expiration deadline for the current CBA until January 9, 2026.
- December 18: The WNBPA announced that the union had authorized the executive committee to "call a strike when necessary" as players continue negotiations with the league over a new CBA.
- February 23, 2026: The WNBA told the WNBPA and its teams that a new CBA must be agreed to by March 10 for the 2026 schedule not to be impacted.
- March 18: The WNBA and WNBPA reached a verbal agreement on the terms of a new CBA.
- March 23: WNBA players unanimously approved the new CBA.
- March 24: The WNBA Board of Governors ratified the new CBA.

The regular season began as scheduled on May 8.

== Drafts ==
=== Draft lottery ===
On November 7, 2025, the WNBA announced that the 2026 draft lottery would be broadcast on Sunday, November 23, on ESPN.

The Dallas Wings won the first overall pick in the draft lottery for the second consecutive year.

=== Expansion draft ===
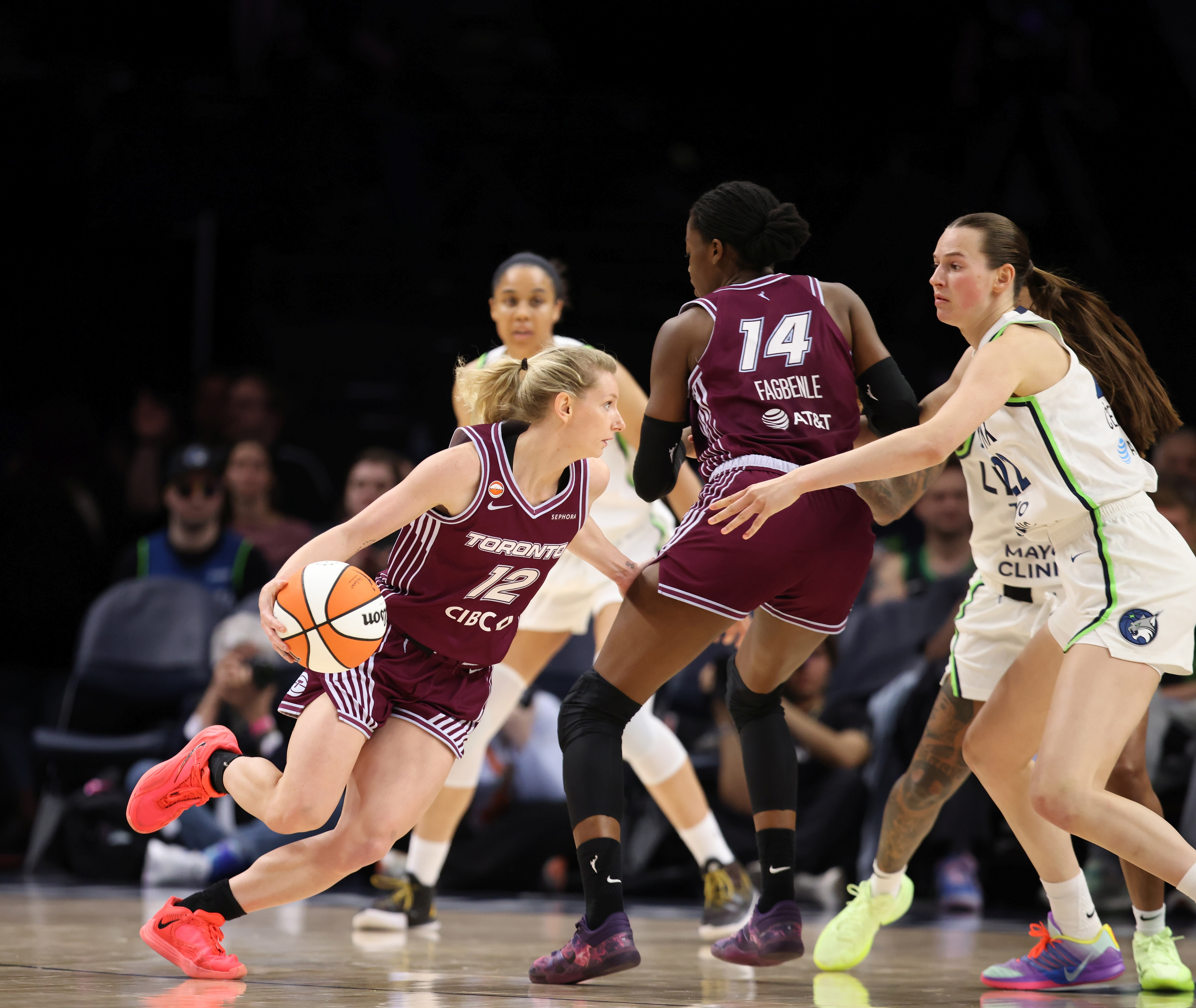
Toronto Tempo players in a pick and roll action on May 1, 2026, ahead of their inaugural 2026 WNBA season.

An expansion draft was held on April 3. The Portland Fire and Toronto Tempo selected players for their respective debut rosters. The Fire and Tempo took turns picking one player from each of the thirteen existing teams except for the Chicago Sky. However, Portland chose not to pick a player from the Las Vegas Aces nor did Toronto draft anyone from the Seattle Storm.

=== 2026 WNBA draft ===
The 2026 WNBA draft was held on Monday, April 13, 2026.

==== Lottery picks ====
Pick	Player	Nationality	Team	School / club team
1	Azzi Fudd	United States	Dallas Wings	UConn
2	Olivia Miles	United States	Minnesota Lynx (from Chicago) (Note: April 13, 2025: Chicago to Minnesota: Minnesota acquired the outright 2026 first-round draft pick and extinguished the previous right to exchange 2026 first-round draft picks with Chicago; Chicago acquired the 2025 No. 11 draft pick (Hailey Van Lith))	TCU
3	Awa Fam	Spain/Senegal	Seattle Storm (from Los Angeles) (Note: January 31, 2024: Seattle to Los Angeles: Los Angeles acquired Kia Nurse and a 2024 first-round pick (Rickea Jackson); Seattle acquired a 2026 first-round pick)	Valencia (Spain)
4	Lauren Betts	United States	Washington Mystics	UCLA
5	Gabriela Jaquez	United States/Mexico	Chicago Sky (from Connecticut) (Note: July 17, 2024: Connecticut to Chicago: Chicago acquired Rachel Banham, Moriah Jefferson, a 2025 first-round pick (Ajša Sivka), and the right to swap 2026 first-round picks; Connecticut acquired Marina Mabrey and a 2025 second-round pick (Rayah Marshall))	UCLA

== Transactions ==
=== Coaching changes ===
Off-season
Team	2025 season	2026 season	Ref.
Dallas Wings	(United States) Chris Koclanes	(United States) Jose Fernandez	
New York Liberty	(Australia) Sandy Brondello	(United States) Chris DeMarco	
Portland Fire	Did not exist	(United Kingdom) Alex Sarama	
Seattle Storm	(United States) Noelle Quinn	(United States) Sonia Raman	
Toronto Tempo	Did not exist	(Australia) Sandy Brondello	

== Preseason ==
=== Schedule ===
2026 WNBA preseason
Preseason

Date	Time (ET)	Matchup			TV	Result	High points	High rebounds	High assists	Location
Monday, April 13	7:00 p.m.	2026 WNBA draft			USA: ESPN; Canada: TSN4/5	—				The Shed
Saturday, April 25	3:00 p.m.	Indiana	@	New York	ION; League Pass	109–91	Han Xu (20)	Tied (7)	R. Johnson (8)	Barclays Center; 14,662
Saturday, April 25	3:00 p.m.	Nigeria	@	Los Angeles	League Pass	63–89	Plum (22)	Atkins (6)	Wheeler (7)	Viejas Arena; 3,459
Saturday, April 25	4:00 p.m.	Chicago	@	Phoenix	League Pass	104–108	Van Lith (20)	Mack (6)	Thomas (8)	Sanford Pentagon; 3,357
Saturday, April 25	7:30 p.m.	Minnesota	@	Washington	League Pass	77–66	Betts (13)	Poffenbarger (13)	C. Williams (3)	CareFirst Arena; 4,200
Saturday, April 25	8:30 p.m.	Seattle	@	Golden State	League Pass	76–78	Tied (14)	Martin (7)	Mair (4)	Chase Center; 18,064
Sunday, April 26	8:00 p.m.	Japan	@	Las Vegas	League Pass	78–94	Yamamoto (24)	N. Smith (13)	Tied (4)	Michelob Ultra Arena; 10,341
Monday, April 27	8:00 p.m.	Nigeria	@	Minnesota	League Pass	79–88	Kalu (25)	Tied (7)	Hamzová (7)	T-Mobile Center; 6,510
Wednesday, April 29	7:00 p.m.	Connecticut	@	Toronto	League Pass	83–78	Tied (21)	Morrow (7)	Leger-Walker (4)	Coca-Cola Coliseum; 8,210
Wednesday, April 29	7:00 p.m.	Atlanta	@	Chicago	League Pass	87–78	S. Taylor (23)	Okot (11)	Van Lith (6)	Wintrust Arena; 6,139
Wednesday, April 29	10:00 p.m.	Portland	@	Seattle	League Pass	81–91	F. Johnson (20)	Malonga (11)	Tied (5)	Climate Pledge Arena; 8,627
Wednesday, April 29	10:00 p.m.	Japan	@	Phoenix	League Pass	60–86	Copper (17)	Mack (9)	Thomas (9)	Mortgage Matchup Center
Thursday, Apr 30	7:00 p.m.	Dallas	@	Indiana	ION; League Pass	95–80	C. Clark (21)	Siegrist (11)	Tied (5)	Gainbridge Fieldhouse; 11,745
Friday, May 1	8:00 p.m.	Toronto	@	Minnesota	League Pass	66–73	Čechová (16)	Tied (7)	C. Williams (6)	Target Center; 7,821
Saturday, May 2	8:00 p.m.	Nigeria	@	Indiana	League Pass	57–105	K. Mitchell (17)	R. Johnson (7)	Boston (6)	Gainbridge Fieldhouse; 10,051
Sunday, May 3	3:00 p.m.	Washington	@	Atlanta	League Pass	83–72	Betts (17)	Tied (6)	Tied (4)	Gateway Center Arena; 3,229
Sunday, May 3	3:00 p.m.	New York	@	Connecticut	ION; League Pass	79–67	Griner (16)	Morrow (8)	Tied (4)	Mohegan Sun Arena; 5,218
Sunday, May 3	7:00 p.m.	Las Vegas	@	Dallas	ION; League Pass	84–101	Tied (18)	A. Smith (7)	Bueckers (9)	Moody Center; 10,179
Sunday, May 3	7:00 p.m.	Los Angeles	@	Portland	League Pass	85–75	Ogwumike (17)	S. Williams (8)	Ogwumike (5)	Moda Center; 13,550

=== All-Star Game ===
ABC

July 25, 2026
7:30 p.m. CT

Team Spoon 129, Team Coop 122
Scoring by quarter: 35–34, 46–30, 24–29, 24–29
Pts: Jonquel Jones (22); Rebs: Jonquel Jones (13); Asts: J. Jones, Miles (8)	Pts: Kelsey Mitchell (28); Rebs: Malonga, Stewart (13); Asts: Bueckers, Stewart (7)

United Center, Chicago, Illinois
Attendance: 19,783
Referees: Roy Gulbeyan, Clare Simmons, Charles Watson

== Regular season ==
=== Standings ===
#	Team	W	L	PCT	GB	Conf.	Home	Road	Cup
1	y — Minnesota Lynx	33	11	.750	–	20–3	15–7	18–4	6–1
2	x — Golden State Valkyries	32	12	.727	1	15–8	17–5	15–7	5–2
3	x — Las Vegas Aces	31	13	.705	2	17–6	15–7	16–6	6–1
4	x — Atlanta Dream	30	14	.682	3	15–5	15–7	15–7	4–2
5	x — Washington Mystics	28	16	.636	5	15–5	15–7	13–9	3–3
6	x — Indiana Fever	28	16	.636	5	14–6	15–7	13–9	5–1
7	x — Dallas Wings	27	17	.614	6	13–10	16–6	11–11	4–3
8	cx – New York Liberty	26	18	.591	7	13–7	14–8	12–10	6–0
9	e — Portland Fire	17	27	.386	16	7–16	9–13	8–14	2–5
10	e — Phoenix Mercury	16	28	.364	17	10–13	7–15	9–13	2–5
11	e — Chicago Sky	16	28	.364	17	4–16	11–11	5–17	1–5
12	e — Los Angeles Sparks	16	28	.364	17	9–14	8–14	8–14	3–4
13	e — Toronto Tempo	11	33	.250	22	5–15	7–15	4–18	2–4
14	e — Connecticut Sun	11	33	.250	22	4–16	8–14	3–19	0–6
15	e — Seattle Storm	8	36	.182	25	1–22	6–16	2–20	0–7

Notes

(#) – League Standing
c – Commissioner's Cup winner
y – Regular season champion
x – Clinched playoff berth
e – Eliminated from playoff contention
Source: Overall standings and Commissioner's Cup Standings

=== Schedule ===
2026 WNBA regular season
May

Date	Time (ET)	Matchup			TV	Result	High points	High rebounds	High assists	Location
Friday, May 8	7:30 p.m.	Connecticut	@	New York	ION; League Pass	75–106	Stewart (31)	Stewart (10)	Vanloo (11)	Barclays Center; 17,615
Friday, May 8	7:30 p.m.	Washington	@	Toronto	ION; League Pass	68–65	Mabrey (27)	Iriafen (16)	Amoore (3)	Coca-Cola Coliseum; 8,210
Friday, May 8	10:00 p.m.	Golden State	@	Seattle	ION; League Pass	91–80	Malonga (21)	Tied (8)	Burton (6)	Climate Pledge Arena; 14,200
Saturday, May 9	1:00 p.m.	Dallas	@	Indiana	ABC, Disney+	107–104	K. Mitchell (30)	Shepard (9)	Shepard (9)	Gainbridge Fieldhouse; 17,274
Saturday, May 9	3:30 p.m.	Phoenix	@	Las Vegas	ABC, Disney+	99–66	Thomas (20)	Mack (15)	Thomas (9)	T-Mobile Arena; 16,511
Saturday, May 9	7:00 p.m.	Atlanta	@	Minnesota	League Pass	91–90	A. Gray (24)	Reese (14)	Miles (8)	Target Center; 10,821
Saturday, May 9	8:00 p.m.	Chicago	@	Portland	NBA TV	98–83	Cardoso (22)	Cardoso (14)	Diggins (7)	Moda Center; 19,335
Sunday, May 10	1:00 p.m.	Seattle	@	Connecticut	League Pass	89–82	Tied (17)	Morrow (16)	Melbourne (6)	Mohegan Sun Arena; 7,374
Sunday, May 10	3:00 p.m.	New York	@	Washington	League Pass	98–93	Johannès (25)	Iriafen (12)	Tied (7)	CareFirst Arena; 4,200
Sunday, May 10	6:00 p.m.	Las Vegas	@	Los Angeles	USA Network	105–78	Plum (27)	Ogwumike (10)	Young (9)	Crypto.com Arena; 12,266
Sunday, May 10	8:30 p.m.	Phoenix	@	Golden State	League Pass	79–95	Salaün (21)	Thomas (9)	Burton (12)	Chase Center; 18,064
Tuesday, May 12	8:00 p.m.	Atlanta	@	Dallas	League Pass	77–72	A. Gray (26)	Reese (16)	Canada (5)	College Park Center; 6,251
Tuesday, May 12	10:00 p.m.	Minnesota	@	Phoenix	League Pass	88–84	Copper (30)	N. Howard (11)	Thomas (8)	Mortgage Matchup Center; 10,826
Tuesday, May 12	10:00 p.m.	New York	@	Portland	League Pass	96–98	Carleton (26)	Stewart (10)	Leite (6)	Moda Center; 12,386
Wednesday, May 13	7:00 p.m.	Seattle	@	Toronto	League Pass	73–86	Mabrey (26)	Tied (8)	Tied (6)	Coca-Cola Coliseum; 8,142
Wednesday, May 13	8:00 p.m.	Las Vegas	@	Connecticut	USA Network	98–69	Carter (27)	Tied (11)	Tied (6)	Mohegan Sun Arena; 5,452
Wednesday, May 13	10:00 p.m.	Chicago	@	Golden State	League Pass	69–63	Tied (18)	Stokes (11)	Diggins (7)	Chase Center; 18,064
Wednesday, May 13	10:30 p.m.	Indiana	@	Los Angeles	USA Network	87–78	Plum (25)	Tied (8)	C. Clark (9)	Crypto.com Arena; 12,605
Thursday, May 14	8:00 p.m.	Minnesota	@	Dallas	Prime	90–86	Bueckers (27)	Tied (8)	Bueckers (8)	College Park Center; 5,982
Thursday, May 14	10:00 p.m.	New York	@	Portland	Prime	100–82	Stewart (22)	J. Jones (9)	Johannès (11)	Moda Center; 13,087
Friday, May 15	7:30 p.m.	Las Vegas	@	Connecticut	League Pass	101–94	Wilson (45)	Morrow (10)	C. Gray (10)	Mohegan Sun Arena; 7,265
Friday, May 15	7:30 p.m.	Washington	@	Indiana	ION; League Pass	104–102	C. Clark (32)	Iriafen (13)	C. Clark (10)	Gainbridge Fieldhouse; 15,673
Friday, May 15	10:00 p.m.	Toronto	@	Los Angeles	ION; League Pass	95–99	Tied (27)	N. Sabally (9)	Plum (9)	Crypto.com Arena; 11,861
Friday, May 15	10:00 p.m.	Chicago	@	Phoenix	League Pass	83–91	Jackson (29)	Thomas (11)	Cloud (7)	Mortgage Matchup Center; 11,094
Sunday, May 17	1:30 p.m.	Las Vegas	@	Atlanta	NBC	85–84	A. Gray (25)	Okot (11)	Young (7)	State Farm Arena; 17,044
Sunday, May 17	6:00 p.m.	Seattle	@	Indiana	Peacock, NBCSN	78–89	C. Clark (21)	C. Clark (7)	C. Clark (10)	Gainbridge Fieldhouse; 14,505
Sunday, May 17	7:00 p.m.	Chicago	@	Minnesota	League Pass	86–79	Tied (20)	Cardoso (12)	Tied (7)	Target Center; 10,001
Sunday, May 17	7:00 p.m.	Toronto	@	Los Angeles	League Pass	106–96	Sykes (38)	Hamby (9)	Tied (7)	Crypto.com Arena; 11,648
Monday, May 18	8:00 p.m.	Washington	@	Dallas	Peacock, NBCSN	69–92	Bueckers (18)	Shepard (16)	Bueckers (7)	College Park Center; 6,251
Monday, May 18	10:00 p.m.	Connecticut	@	Portland	League Pass	82–83	Tied (18)	Morrow (12)	Rivers (6)	Moda Center; 12,010
Tuesday, May 19	10:00 p.m.	Toronto	@	Phoenix	League Pass	98–90	Sykes (31)	Mack (10)	Thomas (8)	Mortgage Matchup Center; 9,337
Wednesday, May 20	7:00 p.m.	Portland	@	Indiana	USA Network	73–90	Boston (24)	Tied (8)	Harris (7)	Gainbridge Fieldhouse; 14,010
Wednesday, May 20	9:00 p.m.	Dallas	@	Chicago	USA Network	99–89	Tied (24)	Cardoso (11)	Shepard (12)	Wintrust Arena; 9,025
Wednesday, May 20	10:00 p.m.	Connecticut	@	Seattle	League Pass	80–78	Hiedeman (20)	Beers (8)	Hiedeman (5)	Climate Pledge Arena; 9,024
Thursday, May 21	8:00 p.m.	Toronto	@	Minnesota	League Pass	72–100	Nurse (23)	C. Williams (8)	Miles (5)	Target Center; 8,910
Thursday, May 21	8:00 p.m.	Golden State	@	New York	Prime	87-70	Stewart (18)	Stewart (9)	Vanloo (8)	Barclays Center; 15,862
Thursday, May 21	10:00 p.m.	Los Angeles	@	Phoenix	Prime	97–88	Hamby (27)	Hamby (15)	Tied (7)	Mortgage Matchup Center; 10,953
Friday, May 22	7:30 p.m.	Dallas	@	Atlanta	ION; League Pass	69–86	R. Howard (25)	Shepard (11)	R. Howard (8)	Gateway Center Arena; 3,626
Friday, May 22	7:30 p.m.	Golden State	@	Indiana	ION; League Pass	82–90	C. Clark (22)	Boston (16)	C. Clark (9)	Gainbridge Fieldhouse; 16,742
Friday, May 22	10:00 p.m.	Connecticut	@	Seattle	ION; League Pass	59–77	Cooke (25)	Tied (7)	Hiedeman (6)	Climate Pledge Arena; 9,741
Saturday, May 23	1:00 p.m.	Minnesota	@	Chicago	CBS	85–75	N. Howard (26)	N. Howard (14)	Diggins (6)	Wintrust Arena; 7,030
Saturday, May 23	6:00 p.m.	Portland	@	Toronto	League Pass	99–80	Tied (19)	Engstler (7)	Tied (9)	Coca-Cola Coliseum; 8.210
Saturday, May 23	8:00 p.m.	Los Angeles	@	Las Vegas	CBS	101–95	Plum (38)	Wilson (15)	Plum (9)	Michelob Ultra Arena; 10,386
Sunday, May 24	3:00 p.m.	Phoenix	@	Atlanta	League Pass	80–82	R. Howard (21)	Thomas (12)	Canada (14)	Gateway Center Arena; 3,575
Sunday, May 24	3:30 p.m.	Dallas	@	New York	NBC	91–76	Tied (24)	Tied (11)	Ionescu (7)	Barclays Center; 17,622
Sunday, May 24	6:00 p.m.	Washington	@	Seattle	League Pass	85–97	Hiedeman (24)	F. Johnson (6)	Tied (6)	Climate Pledge Arena; 10,559
Monday, May 25	8:00 p.m.	Portland	@	New York	Peacock, NBCSN	81–74	Stewart (25)	J. Jones (11)	Johannès (6)	Barclays Center; 13,881
Monday, May 25	10:00 p.m.	Connecticut	@	Golden State	League Pass	70–97	G. Williams (15)	Morrow (10)	Burton (6)	Chase Center; 18,064
Wednesday, May 27	7:00 p.m.	Phoenix	@	New York	USA Network	74–84	Johannès (21)	J. Jones (12)	Thomas (9)	Barclays Center; 14,995
Wednesday, May 27	8:00 p.m.	Toronto	@	Chicago	League Pass	111–104	N. Sabally (29)	E. Williams (9)	Tied (9)	Wintrust Arena; 6,209
Wednesday, May 27	9:00 p.m.	Atlanta	@	Minnesota	USA Network	81–96	C. Williams (25)	Tied (8)	Miles (8)	Target Center; 9,912
Wednesday, May 27	10:00 p.m.	Connecticut	@	Portland	League Pass	61–71	Leite (20)	Morrow (13)	Nelson-Ododa (4)	Moda Center; 11,945
Wednesday, May 27	10:00 p.m.	Washington	@	Seattle	League Pass	78–64	Austin (18)	Austin (13)	Austin (5)	Climate Pledge Arena; 9,202
Thursday, May 28	8:00 p.m.	Las Vegas	@	Dallas	Prime	87–95	Tied (22)	Shepard (20)	Shepard (10)	College Park Center; 6,251
Thursday, May 28	10:00 p.m.	Indiana	@	Golden State	Prime	88–90	Burton (25)	Salaün (7)	Tied (6)	Chase Center; 18,064
Friday, May 29	7:30 p.m.	Phoenix	@	New York	ION; League Pass	68–75	Tied (16)	Tied (16)	Thomas (8)	Barclays Center; 17,579
Friday, May 29	7:30 p.m.	Los Angeles	@	Washington	ION; League Pass	92–87	Austin (25)	Ogwumike (11)	Hamby (9)	CareFirst Arena; 4,200
Friday, May 29	7:30 p.m.	Minnesota	@	Chicago	ION; League Pass	79–58	Coffey (20)	Cardoso (13)	Miles (6)	Wintrust Arena; 7,004
Friday, May 29	10:00 p.m.	Atlanta	@	Portland	ION; League Pass	86–66	Reese (18)	Reese (12)	Winterburn (7)	Moda Center; 13,602
Saturday, May 30	1:00 p.m.	Seattle	@	Toronto	League Pass	72–93	Tied (18)	Holmes (7)	Hiedeman (7)	Coca-Cola Coliseum; 8,210
Saturday, May 30	6:00 p.m.	Los Angeles	@	Connecticut	League Pass	81–84	Morrow (17)	Morrow (14)	Wheeler (6)	PeoplesBank Arena; 10,478
Saturday, May 30	8:00 p.m.	Indiana	@	Portland	CBS	84–100	Boston (24)	Engstler (10)	Leite (12)	Moda Center; 19,347
Sunday, May 31	3:30 p.m.	Las Vegas	@	Golden State	NBC	91–81	Wilson (28)	Wilson (15)	Young (9)	Chase Center; 18,064

June

Date	Time (ET)	Matchup			TV	Result	High points	High rebounds	High assists	Location
Monday, June 1	8:00 p.m.	Seattle	@	Dallas	USA Network	56–79	James (18)	F. Johnson (10)	Bueckers (7)	College Park Center; 6,251
Monday, June 1	10:30 p.m.	Minnesota	@	Phoenix	Peacock, NBCSN	111–97	C. Williams (30)	Mack (11)	Miles (9)	Mortgage Matchup Center; 9,234
Tuesday, June 2	7:30 p.m.	Connecticut	@	Atlanta	League Pass	75–91	R. Howard (36)	Tied (13)	Canada (10)	Gateway Center Arena; 3,575
Tuesday, June 2	7:30 p.m.	Chicago	@	Washington	League Pass	72–90	Austin (17)	Cardoso (13)	Cardoso (5)	CareFirst Arena; 4,200
Tuesday, June 2	10:00 p.m.	Portland	@	Golden State	League Pass	77–95	Thornton (19)	Tied (8)	Burton (9)	Chase Center; 18,064
Tuesday, June 2	10:00 p.m.	Las Vegas	@	Los Angeles	League Pass	79–69	Wilson (25)	Wilson (15)	C. Gray (11)	Crypto.com Arena; 11,178
Wednesday, June 3	8:00 p.m.	Toronto	@	New York	USA Network	82–97	J. Jones (22)	J. Jones (17)	Astier (5)	Barclays Center; 14,574
Wednesday, June 3	10:00 p.m.	Phoenix	@	Seattle	USA Network	72–68	Fam (18)	Mack (10)	Tied (5)	Climate Pledge Arena; 9,109
Thursday, June 4	7:00 p.m.	Atlanta	@	Indiana	Prime	71–83	K. Mitchell (25)	Reese (10)	C. Clark (8)	Gainbridge Fieldhouse; 17,002
Thursday, June 4	9:00 p.m.	Golden State	@	Minnesota	Prime	84–87	Miles (28)	N. Howard (10)	Miles (7)	Target Center; 9,105
Friday, June 5	7:30 p.m.	Connecticut	@	Chicago	ION; League Pass	80–85	Diggins (24)	Morrow (17)	Tied (5)	Wintrust Arena; 6,594
Friday, June 5	10:00 p.m.	Dallas	@	Los Angeles	ION; League Pass	104–96	Ogunbowale (30)	Shepard (15)	Bueckers (14)	Crypto.com Arena; 12,828
Friday, June 5	10:00 p.m.	Phoenix	@	Portland	ION; League Pass	78–72	Bonner (19)	Barker (7)	Nogić (6)	Moda Center; 12,046
Saturday, June 6	1:00 p.m.	Seattle	@	Minnesota	ABC	68–88	N. Howard (27)	Coffey (8)	C. Williams (7)	Target Center; 10,801
Saturday, June 6	3:00 p.m.	Golden State	@	Las Vegas	ABC	79–84	Wilson (28)	Wilson (14)	C. Gray (6)	Michelob Ultra Arena; 10,467
Saturday, June 6	6:00 p.m.	Washington	@	Atlanta	League Pass	77–109	Iriafen (24)	Reese (17)	Citron (6)	Gateway Center Arena; 3,609
Saturday, June 6	8:00 p.m.	Indiana	@	New York	CBS	75–83	Stewart (30)	J. Jones (12)	C. Clark (9)	Barclays Center; 16,306
Sunday, June 7	3:00 p.m.	Chicago	@	Toronto	League Pass	68–85	Sykes (25)	Stevens (10)	Mabrey (6)	Coca-Cola Coliseum; 8,210
Sunday, June 7	7:00 p.m.	Portland	@	Los Angeles	NBA TV	72–89	Hamby (22)	Ogwumike (17)	Tied (7)	Crypto.com Arena; 11,227
Monday, June 8	7:00 p.m.	New York	@	Connecticut	League Pass	89–80	Stewart (28)	Stewart (9)	Lacan (7)	Mohegan Sun Arena
Monday, June 8	7:00 p.m.	Indiana	@	Washington	Peacock, NBCSN	78–76	C. Clark (19)	Boston (10)	Tied (5)	CareFirst Arena; 4,200
Monday, June 8	10:00 p.m.	Seattle	@	Las Vegas	USA Network	91–101	Wilson (34)	Wilson (12)	Wilson (9)	Michelob Ultra Arena; 10,261
Tuesday, June 9	7:00 p.m.	Atlanta	@	Chicago	ESPN	82–75	Cloud (18)	Reese (17)	Canada (6)	Wintrust Arena; 6,921
Tuesday, June 9	8:00 p.m.	Dallas	@	Minnesota	League Pass	76–100	Miles (24)	Shepard (9)	Tied (6)	Target Center; 10,907
Tuesday, June 9	10:00 p.m.	Phoenix	@	Golden State	League Pass	81–87	Tied (25)	Mack (10)	Thomas (9)	Chase Center; 18,064
Wednesday, June 10	7:00 p.m.	Connecticut	@	Toronto	League Pass	102–106 (OT)	Sykes (38)	Nelson-Ododa (13)	Tied (7)	Coca-Cola Coliseum; 8,210
Wednesday, June 10	10:00 p.m.	Los Angeles	@	Seattle	USA Network	88–83	Ogwumike (24)	F. Johnson (12)	Plum (11)	Climate Pledge Arena; 9,309
Thursday, June 11	7:00 p.m.	Chicago	@	Indiana	Prime	106–114 (OT)	Boston (34)	Boston (12)	C. Clark (10)	Gainbridge Fieldhouse; 15,578
Thursday, June 11	7:30 p.m.	New York	@	Atlanta	League Pass	104–90	Reese (25)	Stewart (11)	Canada (7)	Gateway Center Arena; 3,600
Thursday, June 11	9:00 p.m.	Phoenix	@	Dallas	Prime	70–85	Bueckers (31)	Shepard (10)	Thomas (10)	College Park Center; 6,251
Thursday, June 11	10:00 p.m.	Las Vegas	@	Portland	League Pass	105–89	Wilson (32)	Tied (10)	Young (10)	Moda Center; 13,178
Friday, June 12	7:30 p.m.	Toronto	@	Washington	ION; League Pass	85–86	Mabrey (27)	Austin (11)	Amoore (7)	CareFirst Arena; 4,200
Friday, June 12	10:00 p.m.	Golden State	@	Seattle	ION; League Pass	76–72	Hiedeman (26)	Malonga (8)	Burton (8)	Climate Pledge Arena; 10,648
Saturday, June 13	6:00 p.m.	Indiana	@	Connecticut	Peacock, NBCSN	85–75	C. Clark (25)	Boston (11)	Lacan (7)	Mohegan Sun Arena; 8,910
Saturday, June 13	8:00 p.m.	Minnesota	@	Las Vegas	CBS	97–100	Miles (29)	Wilson (10)	Young (10)	Michelob Ultra Arena; 10,330
Saturday, June 13	8:30 p.m.	Dallas	@	Portland	League Pass	83–84	Ogunbowale (22)	Shepard (14)	Leite (8)	Moda Center; 14,612
Saturday, June 13	10:00 p.m.	Los Angeles	@	Phoenix	League Pass	111–102 (OT)	Plum (43)	Ogwumike (15)	Thomas (12)	Mortgage Matchup Center; 9,234
Sunday, June 14	3:00 p.m.	Atlanta	@	Toronto	League Pass	102–77	A. Gray (26)	Reese (17)	Canada (9)	Coca-Cola Coliseum; 8,210
Sunday, June 14	3:00 p.m.	Washington	@	New York	NBA TV	64–86	J. Jones (20)	Stewart (12)	Tied (6)	Barclays Center; 17,581
Monday, June 15	8:00 p.m.	Las Vegas	@	Dallas	USA Network	66–96	Ogunbowale (22)	Shepard (15)	Tied (9)	College Park Center; 6,251
Monday, June 15	8:00 p.m.	Portland	@	Minnesota	League Pass	74–107	N. Howard (18)	Tied (6)	Delaere (7)	Target Center; 10,812
Monday, June 15	10:00 p.m.	Los Angeles	@	Golden State	Peacock, NBCSN	58–78	G. Williams (16)	Hamby (10)	Tied (5)	Chase Center; 18,064
Tuesday, June 16	7:00 p.m.	Toronto	@	Indiana	USA Network	91–113	K. Mitchell (27)	Boston (11)	C. Clark (14)	Gainbridge Fieldhouse; 15,017
Wednesday, June 17	7:00 p.m.	Washington	@	Connecticut	League Pass	88–81	Citron (26)	Citron (11)	Tied (4)	Mohegan Sun Arena; 6,943
Wednesday, June 17	8:00 p.m.	New York	@	Chicago	USA Network	96–95	S. Taylor (24)	J. Jones (8)	Diggins (8)	Wintrust Arena; 7,225
Wednesday, June 17	10:00 p.m.	Las Vegas	@	Phoenix	USA Network	86–76	Wilson (33)	Wilson (10)	Thomas (11)	Mortgage Matchup Center; 9,234
Wednesday, June 17	10:00 p.m.	Dallas	@	Golden State	League Pass	80–91	G. Williams (25)	Thornton (11)	Bueckers (8)	Chase Center; 18,064
Wednesday, June 17	10:00 p.m.	Minnesota	@	Los Angeles	League Pass	99–83	Miles (31)	Tied (9)	C. Williams (5)	Crypto.com Arena; 11,481
Wednesday, June 17	10:00 p.m.	Seattle	@	Portland	League Pass	89–94	Malonga (28)	Malonga (11)	Leite (10)	Moda Center; 13,084
Thursday, June 18	7:30 p.m.	Atlanta	@	Indiana	Prime	108–101	Tied (26)	Reese (11)	C. Clark (7)	Gainbridge Fieldhouse; 17,274
Friday, June 19	7:30 p.m.	Toronto	@	Connecticut	League Pass	101–97	Mabrey (37)	Morrow (10)	Allemand (9)	Mohegan Sun Arena; 7,078
Friday, June 19	7:30 p.m.	Washington	@	New York	ION; League Pass	86–83	Iriafen (20)	Tied (10)	Tied (8)	Barclays Center; 16,539
Friday, June 19	10:00 p.m.	Minnesota	@	Golden State	ION; League Pass	81–75	Zandalasini (23)	C. Williams (12)	Tied (5)	Chase Center; 18,064
Saturday, June 20	1:00 p.m.	Indiana	@	Atlanta	ABC	96–113	C. Clark (26)	Boston (9)	Canada (12)	State Farm Arena; 17,044
Saturday, June 20	3:00 p.m.	Seattle	@	Phoenix	ABC	73–93	Hiedeman (20)	Tied (10)	Brochant (10)	Mortgage Matchup Center; 9,662
Saturday, June 20	8:00 p.m.	Chicago	@	Dallas	CBS	92–93	Cardoso (26)	Stevens (11)	Bueckers (8)	College Park Center; 6,251
Sunday, June 21	4:00 p.m.	Golden State	@	Las Vegas	CBS	73–92	Young (21)	Wilson (9)	C. Gray (9)	Michelob Ultra Arena; 10,350
Sunday, June 21	6:00 p.m.	Washington	@	Minnesota	NBA TV	84–79	Miles (22)	Tied (8)	Amoore (7)	Target Center; 11,610
Sunday, June 21	8:00 p.m.	New York	@	Los Angeles	ESPN	97–98	Ogwumike (24)	Stewart (10)	Tied (7)	Crypto.com Arena; 18,043
Monday, June 22	7:00 p.m.	Chicago	@	Connecticut	League Pass	63–92	Cardoso (16)	Nelson-Ododa (15)	Leger-Walker (5)	Mohegan Sun Arena; 7,036
Monday, June 22	7:30 p.m.	Toronto	@	Atlanta	League Pass	87–94	Mabrey (23)	I. Harrison (10)	Canada (13)	State Farm Arena; 9,685
Monday, June 22	8:00 p.m.	Phoenix	@	Indiana	USA Network	77–86	C. Clark (24)	Billings (10)	Tied (9)	Gainbridge Fieldhouse; 15,198
Monday, June 22	10:00 p.m.	Dallas	@	Seattle	League Pass	112–110 (OT)	Malonga (37)	Malonga (12)	Hiedeman (11)	Climate Pledge Arena; 14,200
Tuesday, June 23	10:00 p.m.	New York	@	Las Vegas	USA Network	87–76	Stewart (20)	Ionescu (10)	C. Gray (8)	Michelob Ultra Arena; 10,274
Wednesday, June 24	7:30 p.m.	Phoenix	@	Indiana	USA Network	111–109	K. Mitchell (30)	Boston (9)	Brochant (9)	Gainbridge Fieldhouse; 16,128
Wednesday, June 24	7:30 p.m.	Minnesota	@	Washington	League Pass	78–76	Citron (28)	Austin (16)	Tied (5)	CareFirst Arena; 4,200
Wednesday, June 24	8:00 p.m.	Portland	@	Chicago	League Pass	78–101	Gustafson (17)	Stevens (11)	Tied (6)	Wintrust Arena; 7,468
Wednesday, June 24	10:00 p.m.	Atlanta	@	Golden State	USA Network	66–77	G. Williams (23)	Reese (12)	Burton (7)	Chase Center; 18,064
Thursday, June 25	7:00 p.m.	Los Angeles	@	Toronto	Prime Video	97–125	Mabrey (53)	Juškaitė (12)	Allemand (14)	Coca-Cola Coliseum; 8,210
Thursday, June 25	10:00 p.m.	New York	@	Seattle	League Pass	88–99	F. Johnson (28)	Malonga (10)	Melbourne (7)	Climate Pledge Arena; 11,968
Thursday, June 25	10:00 p.m.	Dallas	@	Las Vegas	NBA TV	84–99	Wilson (32)	Shepard (14)	C. Gray (9)	Michelob Ultra Arena; 10,295
Friday, June 26	7:30 p.m.	Washington	@	Connecticut	ION; League Pass	57–68	Amoore (14)	Iriafen (14)	Tied (5)	Mohegan Sun Arena; 7,789
Friday, June 26	7:30 p.m.	Portland	@	Chicago	ION; League Pass	94–124	Cardoso (30)	Cardoso (8)	Diggins (9)	Wintrust Arena; 7,228
Friday, June 26	10:00 p.m.	Atlanta	@	Golden State	ION; League Pass	75–78	Canada (23)	Reese (12)	Hayes (5)	Chase Center; 18,064
Saturday, June 27	2:00 p.m.	Phoenix	@	Toronto	CBS	89–80	Copper (27)	Bonner (11)	Allemand (10)	Scotiabank Arena; 15,687
Saturday, June 27	8:00 p.m.	Los Angeles	@	Indiana	CBS	87–111	K. Mitchell (26)	Tied (7)	Wheeler (5)	Gainbridge Fieldhouse; 16,018
Saturday, June 27	9:00 p.m.	Atlanta	@	Seattle	League Pass	90–105	R. Howard (27)	Tied (11)	Canada (10)	Climate Pledge Arena; 13,643
Sunday, June 28	2:00 p.m.	Minnesota	@	Dallas	CBS	85–77	Bueckers (25)	Shepard (16)	Miles (8)	College Park Center; 6,251
Sunday, June 28	3:00 p.m.	Portland	@	Washington	League Pass	123–124 (4OT)	Tied (32)	Austin (13)	Leite (9)	CareFirst Arena; 4,200
Sunday, June 28	4:00 p.m.	Las Vegas	@	Chicago	CBS	107–99	Wilson (30)	Wilson (15)	Tied (8)	United Center; 11,476
Sunday, June 28	7:00 p.m.	New York	@	Golden State	ESPN	67–76	J. Jones (21)	J. Jones (7)	Burton (8)	Chase Center; 18,064
Tuesday, June 30	7:00 p.m.	Commissioner's Cup Final			Prime Video	85–93	Young (31)	Stewart (11)	Tied (7)	Barclays Center; 15,112
Tuesday, June 30	7:00 p.m.	Las Vegas	@	New York	Prime Video	85–93	Young (31)	Stewart (11)	Tied (7)	Barclays Center; 15,112

July

Date	Time (ET)	Matchup			TV	Result	High points	High rebounds	High assists	Location
Thursday, July 2	7:30 p.m.	Atlanta	@	Washington	League Pass	76–81	R. Howard (24)	Reese (13)	Tied (7)	CareFirst Arena; 4,200
Thursday, July 2	8:00 p.m.	Dallas	@	Connecticut	Prime	86–83	Bueckers (25)	Griner (11)	Bueckers (7)	PeoplesBank Arena; 14,578
Thursday, July 2	10:00 p.m.	Seattle	@	Phoenix	League Pass	67–90	Copper (30)	Thomas (13)	Thomas (9)	Mortgage Matchup Center; 10,055
Friday, July 3	7:30 p.m.	Minnesota	@	New York	ION; League Pass	86–99	Stewart (36)	J. Jones (15)	Tied (6)	Barclays Center; 15,345
Friday, July 3	10:00 p.m.	Chicago	@	Las Vegas	ION; League Pass	90–98 (OT)	N. Smith (29)	Cardoso (10)	C. Gray (6)	T-Mobile Arena; 15,837
Saturday, July 4	1:00 p.m.	Golden State	@	Atlanta	CBS	88–83	A. Gray (22)	Reese (13)	Canada (8)	Gateway Center Arena; 3,596
Saturday, July 4	9:00 p.m.	Portland	@	Seattle	League Pass	77–72	Malonga (22)	Gustafson (9)	Tied (4)	Climate Pledge Arena; 10,251
Sunday, July 5	3:00 p.m.	Dallas	@	Toronto	League Pass	89–76	Bueckers (22)	Shepard (15)	Bueckers (7)	Coca-Cola Coliseum; 8,210
Sunday, July 5	7:00 p.m.	Indiana	@	Las Vegas	ESPN	84–68	K. Mitchell (27)	Tied (10)	C. Gray (6)	T-Mobile Arena; 17,796
Monday, July 6	7:30 p.m.	Golden State	@	Washington	League Pass	62–49	Chen (14)	Austin (11)	Chen (4)	CareFirst Arena; 4,200
Monday, July 6	8:00 p.m.	Connecticut	@	Minnesota	League Pass	90–89	Griner (29)	Griner (10)	C. Williams (6)	Target Center; 8,187
Monday, July 6	10:00 p.m.	Seattle	@	Los Angeles	USA Network	82–64	Johnson (23)	Ogwumike (11)	Wheeler (7)	Crypto.com Arena; 12,160
Tuesday, July 7	8:00 p.m.	Dallas	@	New York	ESPN	88–77	Stewart (29)	Tied (12)	Shepard (11)	Barclays Center; 17,532
Tuesday, July 7	10:00 p.m.	Chicago	@	Phoenix	League Pass	77–66	Copper (25)	Stevens (10)	Cloud (6)	Mortgage Matchup Center; 9,586
Wednesday, July 8	7:00 p.m.	Golden State	@	Toronto	League Pass	83–75	Salaün (26)	Thornton (9)	Allemand (7)	Coca-Cola Coliseum; 8,210
Wednesday, July 8	7:30 p.m.	Minnesota	@	Connecticut	USA Network	86–80	McBride (23)	N. Howard (10)	C. Williams (7)	Mohegan Sun Arena; 8,187
Wednesday, July 8	10:00 p.m.	Indiana	@	Los Angeles	USA Network	L 92–106	K. Mitchell (29)	Billings (12)	Wheeler (6)	Crypto.com Arena; 12,939
Thursday, July 9	8:00 p.m.	Seattle	@	Atlanta	Prime	78–89	A. Gray (22)	Reese (11)	Canada (8)	Gateway Center Arena; 3,617
Thursday, July 9	10:00 p.m.	Indiana	@	Phoenix	Prime	92–89	K. Mitchell (29)	Boston (9)	K. Mitchell (8)	Mortgage Matchup Center; 17,071
Thursday, July 9	10:00 p.m.	Las Vegas	@	Portland	League Pass	88–80	Wilson (32)	Wilson (10)	Young (11)	Moda Center; 13,470
Friday, July 10	7:30 p.m.	Golden State	@	Connecticut	ION; League Pass	79–64	Burton (17)	Nelson-Ododa (8)	Tied (6)	Mohegan Sun Arena; 8,546
Friday, July 10	7:30 p.m.	Dallas	@	Toronto	ION; League Pass	108–95	Tied (34)	Shepard (17)	Conde (9)	Bell Centre; 20,996
Friday, July 10	10:00 p.m.	Chicago	@	Los Angeles	ION; League Pass	87–102	Ogwumike (25)	Ogwumike (12)	Wheeler (8)	Crypto.com Arena; 11,827
Saturday, July 11	1:00 p.m.	New York	@	Minnesota	ABC	85–90	Tied (25)	Tied (12)	Tied (5)	Target Center; 12,405
Saturday, July 11	4:00 p.m.	Portland	@	Atlanta	CBS	102–92	A. Gray (20)	Engstler (11)	Canada (12)	Gateway Center Arena; 3,577
Saturday, July 11	6:00 p.m.	Phoenix	@	Las Vegas	Peacock, NBCSN	58–106	Wilson (21)	Wilson (15)	C. Gray (12)	Michelob Ultra Arena; 10,321
Sunday, July 12	3:00 p.m.	New York	@	Toronto	NBA TV	91–93	Mabrey (30)	J. Jones (10)	Allemand (10)	Bell Centre; 12,724
Sunday, July 12	3:00 p.m.	Seattle	@	Washington	League Pass	79–84	Hiedeman (31)	Malonga (15)	Tied (4)	CareFirst Arena; 4,200
Sunday, July 12	7:00 p.m.	Chicago	@	Dallas	ESPN	91–96	Bueckers (22)	Tied (13)	Bueckers (11)	American Airlines Center; 13,236
Sunday, July 12	9:00 p.m.	Indiana	@	Las Vegas	NBC	109–75	K. Mitchell (27)	Wilson (12)	Tied (6)	Michelob Ultra Arena; 10,513
Monday, July 13	7:00 p.m.	Los Angeles	@	Atlanta	USA Network	92–101	Reese (23)	Reese (13)	Canada (9)	Gateway Center Arena; 3,592
Monday, July 13	9:00 p.m.	Phoenix	@	Minnesota	Peacock, NBCSN	100–104	McBride (37)	Bonner (9)	Thomas (12)	Target Center; 10,221
Tuesday, July 14	11:00 a.m.	Portland	@	Connecticut	League Pass	87–90	Edwards (21)	Edwards (8)	Tied (7)	Mohegan Sun Arena; 8,917
Tuesday, July 14	7:00 p.m.	Washington	@	Toronto	League Pass	79–62	Iriafen (25)	Iriafen (14)	Flórez (5)	Coca-Cola Coliseum; 8,210
Wednesday, July 15	12:00 p.m.	Seattle	@	Chicago	League Pass	90–95	F. Johnson (25)	Malonga (12)	Tied (6)	Wintrust Arena; 9,025
Wednesday, July 15	1:00 p.m.	Los Angeles	@	Minnesota	League Pass	87–96	Tied (24)	Ogwumike (12)	Tied (6)	Target Center; 16,410
Wednesday, July 15	8:00 p.m.	Golden State	@	Indiana	USA Network	88–75	K. Mitchell (20)	Thornton (8)	C. Clark (6)	Gainbridge Fieldhouse; 17,014
Thursday, July 16	7:00 p.m.	Portland	@	Washington	NBA TV	75–56	Austin (19)	Austin (9)	Tied (5)	CareFirst Arena; 4,200
Friday, July 17	7:30 p.m.	Seattle	@	Indiana	ION; League Pass	107–110	C. Clark (45)	Malonga (14)	C. Clark (10)	Gainbridge Fieldhouse; 17,274
Friday, July 17	7:30 p.m.	Atlanta	@	Toronto	ION; League Pass	111–92	Mabrey (26)	Reese (12)	Canada (13)	Coca-Cola Coliseum; 8,210
Friday, July 17	7:30 p.m.	Los Angeles	@	Chicago	ION; League Pass	82–96	S. Taylor (19)	Ogwumike (12)	Cloud (9)	Wintrust Arena; 8,123
Friday, July 17	10:00 p.m.	Connecticut	@	Phoenix	ION; League Pass	96–83	Lacan (26)	Bonner (10)	Leger-Walker (7)	Mortgage Matchup Center; 10,321
Saturday, July 18	8:00 p.m.	New York	@	Indiana	CBS	88–108	K. Mitchell (33)	Stewart (8)	C. Clark (7)	Gainbridge Fieldhouse; 17,274
Saturday, July 18	8:00 p.m.	Portland	@	Minnesota	League Pass	93–101	McBride (24)	Carleton (8)	Miles (10)	Target Center; 12,101
Saturday, July 18	8:30 p.m.	Washington	@	Golden State	League Pass	69–74	Tied (18)	Austin (16)	Burton (11)	Chase Center; 18,064
Sunday, July 19	1:00 p.m.	Los Angeles	@	Dallas	ABC	82–90	Bueckers (25)	Shepard (14)	Wheeler (10)	College Park Center; 6,251
Sunday, July 19	4:00 p.m.	Chicago	@	Atlanta	CBS	91–93	A. Gray (29)	B. Jones (10)	Canada (9)	Gateway Center Arena; 3,575
Sunday, July 19	7:00 p.m.	Connecticut	@	Phoenix	ESPN	63–72	Bonner (21)	Nelson-Ododa (12)	Thomas (11)	Mortgage Matchup Center; 13,481
Monday, July 20	8:00 p.m.	Las Vegas	@	Toronto	Peacock, NBCSN	109–83	Tied (26)	I. Harrison (11)	Young (12)	Coca-Cola Coliseum; 8,210
Monday, July 20	8:00 p.m.	New York	@	Dallas	Prime	99–98 (OT)	Stewart (33)	Shepard (16)	Stewart (8)	College Park Center; 6,251
Monday, July 20	10:00 p.m.	Washington	@	Golden State	League Pass	90–82	Iriafen (23)	Austin (15)	Amoore (8)	Chase Center; 18,064
Monday, July 20	10:00 p.m.	Minnesota	@	Seattle	USA Network	105–102	McBride (33)	N. Howard (12)	Hiedeman (10)	Climate Pledge Arena; 12,500
Wednesday, July 22	3:00 p.m.	Phoenix	@	Los Angeles	League Pass	86–82	Copper (21)	Ogwumike (13)	Thomas (15)	Crypto.com Arena; 16,900
Wednesday, July 22	3:00 p.m.	Minnesota	@	Seattle	League Pass	86–76	Collier (24)	Tied (10)	Tied (6)	Climate Pledge Arena; 13,106
Wednesday, July 22	7:00 p.m.	Chicago	@	New York	League Pass	94–95	S. Taylor (31)	J. Jones (10)	Cloud (7)	Barclays Center; 16,783
Wednesday, July 22	7:30 p.m.	Las Vegas	@	Washington	League Pass	99–100	Wilson (38)	Iriafen (10)	Citron (8)	CareFirst Arena; 4,200
Wednesday, July 22	8:00 p.m.	Connecticut	@	Indiana	USA Network	88–123	Caitlin Clark (27)	Tied (8)	Caitlin Clark (11)	Gainbridge Fieldhouse; 17,274
Wednesday, July 22	10:00 p.m.	Dallas	@	Portland	USA Network	101–97	Ogunbowale (24)	Shepard (15)	Leite (11)	Moda Center; 17,206
Saturday, July 25	8:30 p.m.	WNBA All-Star Game			ABC	129–122	K. Mitchell (28)	Tied (13)	Tied (8)	United Center; 19,783
Saturday, July 25	8:30 p.m.	Team Spoon	@	Team Coop	ABC	129–122	K. Mitchell (28)	Tied (13)	Tied (8)	United Center; 19,783
Tuesday, July 28	7:30 p.m.	Connecticut	@	Washington	NBA TV	84–92	Citron (22)	Iriafen (10)	Leger-Walker (8)	CareFirst Arena; 4,200
Tuesday, July 28	8:00 p.m.	Toronto	@	Minnesota	League Pass	93–100	Mabrey (25)	Conde (10)	Miles (8)	Target Center; 12,121
Tuesday, July 28	9:30 p.m.	Indiana	@	Seattle	ESPN	105–95	Hiedeman (33)	Billings (11)	C. Clark (7)	Climate Pledge Arena; 18,343
Tuesday, July 28	10:00 p.m.	Portland	@	Las Vegas	League Pass	83–98	Wilson (28)	Wilson (14)	C. Gray (7)	Michelob Ultra Arena; 10,240
Tuesday, July 28	10:00 p.m.	New York	@	Los Angeles	League Pass	113–109	Stewart (29)	Ionescu (7)	Tied (9)	Crypto.com Arena; 15,499
Wednesday, July 29	8:00 p.m.	Atlanta	@	Dallas	USA Network	82–81	A. Gray (25)	Shepard (14)	Canada (8)	College Park Center; 6,251
Wednesday, July 29	10:00 p.m.	Golden State	@	Phoenix	USA Network	89–91	Copper (27)	Tied (10)	Thomas (8)	Mortgage Matchup Center; 10,152
Thursday, July 30	7:00 p.m.	Minnesota	@	Toronto	League Pass	104–72	Juškaitė (19)	N. Howard (8)	Allemand (6)	Scotiabank Arena; 18,145
Thursday, July 30	8:00 p.m.	Connecticut	@	Chicago	Prime	88–94	Cardoso (26)	Nelson-Ododa (11)	Tied (6)	Wintrust Arena; 7,297
Thursday, July 30	10:00 p.m.	New York	@	Las Vegas	Prime	99–104	Wilson (33)	Stewart (11)	Young (9)	Michelob Ultra Arena; 10,500
Friday, July 31	7:30 p.m.	Seattle	@	Atlanta	ION; League Pass	89–98	Hiedeman (23)	Tied (13)	Canada (9)	Gateway Center Arena; 3,610
Friday, July 31	7:30 p.m.	Dallas	@	Washington	ION; League Pass	75–81	Austin (28)	Austin (10)	Shepard (8)	CareFirst Arena; 4,200
Friday, July 31	10:00 p.m.	Indiana	@	Portland	ION; League Pass	112–98	Tied (26)	C. Clark (10)	Leite (12)	Moda Center; 19,959

August

Date	Time (ET)	Matchup			TV	Result	High points	High rebounds	High assists	Location
Saturday, August 1	1:00 p.m.	Las Vegas	@	Chicago	CBS, Paramount+	83–84	Wilson (36)	Tied (12)	C. Gray (9)	Wintrust Arena; 9,025
Saturday, August 1	3:00 p.m.	New York	@	Phoenix	ABC	92–94	Ionescu (27)	Stewart (11)	Ionescu (10)	Mortgage Matchup Center; 10,097
Sunday, August 2	1:00 p.m.	Indiana	@	Minnesota	ABC	100–108	Mitchell (37)	Tied (8)	C. Clark (10)	Target Center; 16,505
Sunday, August 2	3:30 p.m.	Los Angeles	@	Portland	NBC, Peacock	106–101	Carleton (24)	Carleton (11)	Tied (8)	Moda Center; 13,638
Sunday, August 2	7:00 p.m.	Connecticut	@	Dallas	ESPN, Disney+	63–83	Miller (22)	Nelson-Ododa (11)	Ogunbowale (5)	College Park Center; 6,251
Sunday, August 2	8:30 p.m.	Toronto	@	Golden State	League Pass	79–96	Salaün (24)	Stokes (11)	Tied (6)	Chase Center; 18,064
Monday, August 3	7:00 p.m.	Las Vegas	@	Atlanta	Peacock, NBCSN	109–87	Young (28)	Reese (16)	Young (10)	State Farm Arena; 17,044
Monday, August 3	7:00 p.m.	Seattle	@	New York	League Pass	83–95	F. Johnson (25)	Fam (9)	Hiedeman (7)	Barclays Center; 15,312
Monday, August 3	9:00 p.m.	Phoenix	@	Chicago	USA Network	106–101	Copper (31)	Thomas (15)	Thomas (12)	Wintrust Arena; 7,011
Tuesday, August 4	10:00 p.m.	Toronto	@	Golden State	League Pass	81–92	Tied (21)	Burton (8)	Allemand (8)	Chase Center; 18,064
Wednesday, August 5	7:00 p.m.	Phoenix	@	Atlanta	League Pass	82–96	R. Howard (23)	Bonner (11)	R. Howard (8)	Gateway Center Arena; 3,575
Wednesday, August 5	7:00 p.m.	Seattle	@	New York	USA Network	86–92	Malonga (31)	J. Jones (15)	Tied (7)	Barclays Center; 16,971
Wednesday, August 5	7:30 p.m.	Dallas	@	Washington	League Pass	92–96	Austin (27)	Austin (13)	Shepard (7)	CareFirst Arena; 4,200
Wednesday, August 5	9:00 p.m.	Los Angeles	@	Chicago	USA Network	88–95	Hamby (22)	Hamby (14)	Cloud (9)	Wintrust Arena; 7,129
Thursday, August 6	7:00 p.m.	Las Vegas	@	Indiana	Prime	86–84 (OT)	Mitchell (28)	Wilson (13)	Young (9)	Gainbridge Fieldhouse; 17,274
Thursday, August 6	9:00 p.m.	Los Angeles	@	Minnesota	Prime	89–82	Miles (23)	Hamby (9)	Wheeler (9)	Target Center; 12,824
Thursday, August 6	10:00 p.m.	Toronto	@	Portland	League Pass	83–97	Leite (27)	Carleton (11)	Allemand (12)	Moda Center; 12,379
Friday, August 7	7:30 p.m.	Phoenix	@	Connecticut	ION; League Pass	72–75	Plum (25)	Bonner (11)	Tied (5)	Mohegan Sun Arena; 8,910
Friday, August 7	7:30 p.m.	Atlanta	@	Washington	ION; League Pass	74–79	A. Gray (26)	Reese (16)	Canada (7)	CareFirst Arena; 4,200
Friday, August 7	9:30 p.m.	Golden State	@	Dallas	ION; League Pass	94–76	Burton (22)	Shepard (11)	Burton (7)	American Airlines Center; 16,444
Saturday, August 8	1:00 p.m.	Las Vegas	@	Minnesota	CBS, Paramount+	87–98	Miles (26)	N. Smith (11)	Tied (7)	Target Center; 14,101
Saturday, August 8	3:30 p.m.	Indiana	@	Chicago	ABC	90–86	Mitchell (27)	Boston (11)	C. Clark (11)	United Center; 16,065
Saturday, August 8	8:30 p.m.	Seattle	@	Portland	NBA TV	93–100	Carleton (24)	Malonga (9)	Winterburn (7)	Moda Center; 15,294
Sunday, August 9	12:30 p.m.	Las Vegas	@	New York	ABC	71–111	Johannès (27)	Tied (8)	Fauthoux (9)	Barclays Center; 17,082
Sunday, August 9	3:00 p.m.	Phoenix	@	Washington	League Pass	75–95	Tied (19)	Austin (11)	Tied (6)	CareFirst Arena; 4,200
Sunday, August 9	3:30 p.m.	Dallas	@	Minnesota	NBC, Peacock	90–103	McBride (43)	Tied (8)	Miles (13)	Target Center; 14,421
Sunday, August 9	7:00 p.m.	Golden State	@	Los Angeles	ESPN, Disney+	84–78	Ogwumike (16)	Tied (7)	Burton (7)	Crypto.com Arena; 15,739
Monday, August 10	8:00 p.m.	Toronto	@	Atlanta	Peacock, NBSCN	95–107	Mabrey (36)	Reese (14)	Canada (9)	Gateway Center Arena; 3,575
Monday, August 10	10:00 p.m.	Chicago	@	Seattle	USA Network	87–102	Tied (26)	Cardoso (13)	Hiedeman (9)	Climate Pledge Arena; 11,655
Tuesday, August 11	7:30 p.m.	New York	@	Indiana	ESPN	92–106	Mitchell (28)	J. Jones (10)	C. Clark (10)	Gainbridge Fieldhouse; 16,507
Tuesday, August 11	10:00 p.m.	Washington	@	Las Vegas	League Pass	76–86	Wilson (26)	Tied (13)	Young (8)	Michelob Ultra Arena; 10,224
Tuesday, August 11	10:00 p.m.	Phoenix	@	Los Angeles	NBA TV, League Pass	94–87	Brochant (24)	Ogwumike (9)	Thomas (9)	Galen Center; 6,247
Wednesday, August 12	8:00 p.m.	Toronto	@	Dallas	USA Network	88–94	Mabrey (23)	A. Smith (11)	Bueckers (8)	College Park Center; 6,251
Wednesday, August 12	10:00 p.m.	Chicago	@	Golden State	USA Network	71–91	Hayes (22)	Tied (6)	Cloud (9)	Chase Center; 18,064
Wednesday, August 12	10:00 p.m.	Minnesota	@	Portland	League Pass	85–81	Collier (20)	N. Howard (12)	Oblak (9)	Moda Center; 13,270
Thursday, August 13	7:00 p.m.	Atlanta	@	Connecticut	League Pass	104–69	Tied (29)	Reese (15)	Tied (4)	Mohegan Sun Arena; 8,911
Thursday, August 13	8:00 p.m.	Los Angeles	@	New York	Prime	81–85	Burrell (28)	J. Jones (18)	Wheeler (6)	Barclays Center; 16,071
Thursday, August 13	10:00 p.m.	Washington	@	Las Vegas	Prime	76–83	Young (32)	Tied (8)	Citron (8)	Michelob Ultra Arena; 10,215
Friday, August 14	7:30 p.m.	Dallas	@	Indiana	ION, League Pass	87–98	Tied (29)	Boston (10)	C. Clark (10)	Gainbridge Fieldhouse; 17,274
Friday, August 14	10:00 p.m.	Portland	@	Seattle	ION, League Pass	84–82	Tied (20)	Malonga (12)	Leite (6)	Climate Plege Arena; 12,596
Saturday, August 15	1:00 p.m.	New York	@	Connecticut	League Pass	82–75	J. Jones (23)	J. Jones (11)	Lacan (6)	Mohegan Sun Arena; 8,911
Saturday, August 15	7:30 p.m.	Los Angeles	@	Washington	League Pass	70–80	Citron (21)	Austin (11)	Citron (8)	CareFirst Arena; 4,200
Saturday, August 15	8:00 p.m.	Minnesota	@	Las Vegas	CBS, Paramount+	92–87	Wilson (32)	N. Smith (12)	Tied (9)	Michelob Ultra Arena; 10,415
Sunday, August 16	5:00 p.m.	Chicago	@	Seattle	League Pass	82–80	Cardoso (22)	Malonga (13)	Tied (6)	Climate Pledge Arena; 12,916
Sunday, August 16	5:00 p.m.	Indiana	@	Atlanta	ESPN, Disney+	95–91 (OT)	A. Gray (32)	Tied (14)	C. Clark (9)	State Farm Arena; 17,044
Sunday, August 16	7:00 p.m.	Portland	@	Phoenix	ESPN, Disney+	88–85	Tied (23)	Thomas (11)	Thomas (9)	Mortgage Matchup Center; 16,513
Monday, August 17	10:00 p.m.	Dallas	@	Golden State	Peacock, NBCSN	70–78	G. Williams (23)	Tied (7)	Burton (5)	Chase Center; 18,064
Tuesday, August 18	7:00 p.m.	Los Angeles	@	Connecticut	League Pass	77–85	Burrell (19)	Nelson-Ododa (11)	Lacan (10)	TD Garden; 16,378
Tuesday, August 18	7:00 p.m.	Indiana	@	Toronto	ESPN	101–95	Mitchell (29)	Morrow (16)	C. Clark (7)	Scotiabank Arena; 19,300
Tuesday, August 18	9:00 p.m.	New York	@	Chicago	League Pass	86–93	Cloud (35)	Carsoso (12)	Ionescu (12)	Wintrust Arena; 7,099
Tuesday, August 18	9:00 p.m.	Atlanta	@	Las Vegas	ESPN	97–82	Wilson (27)	Wilson (14)	Tied (5)	Michelob Ultra Arena; 10,219
Wednesday, August 19	7:30 p.m.	Toronto	@	Washington	League Pass	82–93	Iriafen (21)	Iriafen (13)	Citron (6)	CareFirst Arena; 4,200
Wednesday, August 19	10:00 p.m.	Minnesota	@	Golden State	USA Network	77–66	Tied (20)	Collier (8)	Tied (7)	Chase Center; 18,064
Thursday, August 20	8:00 p.m.	Indiana	@	Dallas	Prime	85–91	Mitchell (37)	Timpson (12)	C. Clark (9)	American Airlines Center; 20,297
Thursday, August 20	10:00 p.m.	Connecticut	@	Las Vegas	League Pass	78–101	Young (24)	Parker-Tyus (9)	Tied (5)	Michelob Ultra Arena; 10,207
Thursday, August 20	10:00 p.m.	Atlanta	@	Los Angeles	Prime	124–88	R. Howard (26)	Reese (10)	Canada (11)	Crypto.com Arena; 12,223
Friday, August 21	7:30 p.m.	Minnesota	@	Washington	ION; League Pass	94–84	Miles (24)	Iriafen (13)	C. Williams (8)	CareFirst Arena; 4,200
Friday, August 21	7:30 p.m.	Golden State	@	Chicago	ION; League Pass	70–73	Cloud (17)	Cardoso (10)	Vandersloot (5)	Wintrust Arena; 8,028
Friday, August 21	10:00 p.m.	Portland	@	Toronto	ION; League Pass	79–82	I. Harrison (25)	I. Harrison (10)	Tied (6)	Rogers Arena; 12,414
Saturday, August 22	7:00 p.m.	Indiana	@	New York	Prime	102–109	Mitchell (25)	J. Jones (10)	Tied (7)	Barclays Center; 17,581
Saturday, August 22	9:00 p.m.	Connecticut	@	Los Angeles	Prime	68–77	Burrell (20)	Ogwumike (11)	Wheeler (5)	Crypto.com Arena; 10,878
Saturday, August 22	10:00 p.m.	Atlanta	@	Phoenix	League Pass	99–89	Copper (38)	Thomas (16)	Thomas (10)	Mortgage Matchup Center; 12,431
Sunday, August 23	4:00 p.m.	Seattle	@	Dallas	NBA TV	70–92	Bueckers (32)	Shepard (11)	Ogunbowale (6)	College Park Center; 6,251
Sunday, August 23	7:00 p.m.	Indiana	@	Chicago	NBC, Peacock	113–90	Mitchell (30)	Timpson (9)	C. Clark (10)	Wintrust Arena; 9,248
Sunday, August 23	7:00 p.m.	Washington	@	Portland	League Pass	105–100	Austin (31)	Tied (10)	Leite (11)	Moda Center; 14,860
Sunday, August 23	7:00 p.m.	Las Vegas	@	Toronto	League Pass	88–78	Wilson (27)	N. Smith (8)	Tied (7)	Rogers Arena; 15,877
Monday, August 24	8:00 p.m.	Golden State	@	Minnesota	USA Network	80–66	Zandasini (18)	Stokes (9)	Burton (9)	Target Center; 16,001
Monday, August 24	10:00 p.m.	Atlanta	@	Los Angeles	Peacock, NBCSN	78–71	Ogwumike (27)	Reese (26)	Tied (6)	Crypto.com Arena; 10,442
Tuesday, August 25	7:00 p.m.	Chicago	@	Connecticut	League Pass	81–87	Edwards (26)	Cardoso (13)	Vandersloot (9)	Mohegan Sun Arena; 8,048
Tuesday, August 25	8:00 p.m.	Portland	@	Dallas	NBA TV	78–96	Bueckers (22)	Engstler (15)	Bueckers (11)	College Park Center; 6,251
Tuesday, August 25	10:00 p.m.	Washington	@	Phoenix	League Pass	94–84	Tied (19)	Iriafen (10)	Thomas (10)	Mortgage Matchup Center; 10,459
Wednesday, August 26	7:00 p.m.	Golden State	@	Connecticut	League Pass	89–64	Leger-Walker (17)	Charles (8)	Burton (7)	Mohegan Sun Arena; 7,739
Wednesday, August 26	10:00 p.m.	Toronto	@	Seattle	USA Network	78–90	Rice (24)	I. Harrison (14)	Melbourne (7)	Climate Plege Arena; 11,558
Thurdsay, August 27	8:00 p.m.	Golden State	@	New York	Prime	79–60	Zandalasini (20)	Stokes (9)	Burton (13)	Barclays Center; 17,579
Thurdsay, August 27	10:00 p.m.	Washington	@	Phoenix	Prime	80–73	Copper (35)	Iriafen (12)	Thomas (8)	Mortage Matchup Center; 9,040
Friday, August 28	7:30 p.m.	Portland	@	Atlanta	ION; League Pass	101–83	Tied (26)	Reese (16)	Tied (6)	Gateway Center Arena; 3,575
Friday, August 28	7:30 p.m.	Connecticut	@	Indiana	ION; League Pass	91–111	Tied (34)	Timpson (8)	C. Clark (12)	Gainbridge Fieldhouse; 17,274
Friday, August 28	10:00 p.m.	Toronto	@	Las Vegas	ION; League Pass	73–93	Wilson (27)	Tied (8)	Young (8)	Michelob Ultra Arena; 10,523
Friday, August 28	10:00 p.m.	Washington	@	Los Angeles	ION; League Pass	82–88	Ogwumike (24)	Tied (10)	Wheeler (8)	Crypto.com Arena; 12,551
Saturday, August 29	1:00 p.m.	Chicago	@	New York	CBS, Paramount+	66–85	Han Xu (19)	Stewart (9)	Vandersloot (6)	Barclays Center; 17,107
Saturday, August 29	10:00 p.m.	Toronto	@	Phoenix	League Pass	69–101	I. Harrison (16)	I. Harrison (10)	Thomas (12)	Mortgage Matchup Center; 11,699
Sunday, August 30	3:00 p.m.	Minnesota	@	Atlanta	NBA TV	81–89	A. Gray (23)	Tied (11)	Canada (10)	Gateway Center Arena; 3,614
Sunday, August 30	5:00 p.m.	Los Angeles	@	Seattle	League Pass	90–74	Ogwumike (23)	Malonga (15)	Tied (4)	Climate Pledge Arena; 14,200
Sunday, August 30	7:00 p.m.	Golden State	@	Portland	League Pass	86–69	Hayes (18)	Charles (8)	Oblak (7)	Moda Center; 15,146
Sunday, August 30	8:00 p.m.	Connecticut	@	Dallas	League Pass	71–97	Edwards (26)	Shepard (10)	Bueckers (6)	College Park Center; 6,251

September

Date	Time (ET)	Matchup			TV	Result	High points	High rebounds	High assists	Location
Thursday, September 17	7:30 p.m.	Connecticut	@	Atlanta	League Pass	59–103	Reese (30)	Reese (10)	R. Howard (7)	Gateway Center Arena; 3,575
Thursday, September 17	8:00 p.m.	Washington	@	Chicago	League Pass	110–80	Austin (20)	Iriafen (11)	Tied (5)	Wintrust Arena; 8,945
Thursday, September 17	8:00 p.m.	Los Angeles	@	Dallas	USA Network	77–97	Bueckers (19)	Shepard (11)	Shepard (12)	College Park Center; 6,251
Thursday, September 17	10:00 p.m.	Phoenix	@	Portland	League Pass	94–91	Ciezki (22)	Thomas (8)	J. Harrison (10)	Moda Center; 13,641
Thursday, September 17	10:00 p.m.	Las Vegas	@	Seattle	USA Network, CNBC	114–77	Young (35)	Tied (9)	Hiedeman (7)	Climate Pledge Arena; 14,200
Friday, September 18	7:30 p.m.	Indiana	@	Toronto	ION; League Pass	103–85	Mitchell (33)	I. Harrison (9)	C. Clark (14)	Coca-Cola Coliseum; 8,210
Friday, September 18	7:30 p.m.	New York	@	Minnesota	ION; League Pass	93–81	Stewart (24)	Tied (10)	Ionescu (6)	Target Center; 15,710
Friday, September 18	10:00 p.m.	Portland	@	Golden State	ION; League Pass	66–82	Tied (17)	Tied (9)	Hayes (7)	Chase Center; 18,064
Saturday, September 19	1:00 p.m.	Phoenix	@	Dallas	CBS, Paramount+	82–87	Bueckers (26)	Thomas (10)	Thomas (11)	College Park Center; 6,251
Saturday, September 19	7:00 p.m.	Chicago	@	Atlanta	Prime	81–106	Reese (23)	Reese (10)	Canada (9)	State Farm Arena; 17,099
Saturday, September 19	9:00 p.m.	Seattle	@	Golden State	Prime	57–70	F. Johnson (17)	Charles (12)	Hayes (6)	Chase Center; 18,064
Sunday, September 20	1:00 p.m.	Minnesota	@	Connecticut	League Pass	101–89	Collier (23)	N. Howard (11)	Leger-Walker (8)	Mohegan Sun Arena; 8,911
Sunday, September 20	3:00 p.m.	New York	@	Toronto	League Pass	106–69	Juškaitė (28)	Astier (9)	Ionescu (9)	Coca-Cola Coliseum; 8,210
Sunday, September 20	4:00 p.m.	Washington	@	Indiana	NBA TV	93–77	C. Clark (25)	Iriafen (14)	Citron (10)	Gainbridge Fieldhouse; 17,274
Sunday, September 20	7:00 p.m.	Portland	@	Los Angeles	USA Network	84–105	Leite (23)	Ogwumike (12)	Tied (5)	Crypto.com Arena; 17,703
Sunday, September 20	9:00 p.m.	Seattle	@	Las Vegas	USA Network, CNBC	77–98	Wilson (30)	Tied (8)	Young (8)	Michelob Ultra Arena; 10,263
Monday, September 21	8:00 p.m.	Atlanta	@	New York	Peacock, NBCSN	95–84	Stewart (27)	Stewart (14)	Canada (9)	Barclays Center; 16,458
Monday, September 21	10:00 p.m.	Dallas	@	Phoenix	USA Network	86–87	Copper (31)	Shepard (19)	Thomas (12)	Mortgage Matchup Center; 11,941
Tuesday, September 22	7:30 p.m.	Connecticut	@	Washington	League Pass	69–79	Austin (25)	Tied (13)	Tied (3)	CareFirst Arena; 4,200
Tuesday, September 22	8:00 p.m.	Minnesota	@	Indiana	ESPN	77–96	C. Clark (27)	Juhász (12)	C. Clark (9)	Gainbridge Fieldhouse; 16,521
Tuesday, September 22	8:00 p.m.	Toronto	@	Chicago	League Pass	85–97	I. Harrison (21)	I. Harrison (13)	Vandersloot (9)	Wintrust Arena; 8,036
Tuesday, September 22	10:00 p.m.	Los Angeles	@	Las Vegas	ESPN	79–89	Wilson (18)	Wilson (10)	Young (11)	Michelob Ultra Arena; 10,377
Tuesday, September 22	10:00 p.m.	Golden State	@	Portland	League Pass	82–90 (OT)	Carleton (26)	Engstler (11)	J. Harrison (10)	Moda Center; 14,815
Wednesday, September 23	8:00 p.m.	Atlanta	@	New York	USA Network	83–65	A. Gray (24)	J. Jones (14)	R. Howard (6)	Barclays Center; 17,581
Wednesday, September 23	10:00 p.m.	Dallas	@	Seattle	USA Network, CNBC	103–91	Malonga (29)	Shepard (11)	Hiedeman (14)	Climate Pledge Arena; 14,200
Thursday, September 24	7:00 p.m.	Toronto	@	Connecticut	NBA TV	81–95	Rice (28)	I. Harrison (10)	Van Lith (8)	Mohegan Sun Arena; 8,911
Thursday, September 24	7:30 p.m.	Chicago	@	Washington	League Pass	93–101	Citron (21)	Iriafen (15)	Vandersloot (7)	Capital One Arena; 9,798
Thursday, September 24	8:00 p.m.	Indiana	@	Minnesota	USA Network	66–86	McBride (22)	Billings (10)	C. Williams (10)	Target Center; 15,221
Thursday, September 24	10:00 p.m.	Golden State	@	Los Angeles	League Pass	76–75	Chen (18)	Ogwumike (15)	Tied (5)	Crypto.com Arena; 15,965
Thursday, September 24	10:00 p.m.	Las Vegas	@	Phoenix	USA Network, CNBC	100–82	Wilson (34)	Wilson (10)	Young (11)	Mortgage Matchup Center; 12,385

Notes:

- Games highlighted in represent Commissioner's Cup games.
- Game highlighted in represents the 2026 WNBA All-Star Game.

== Playoffs ==
=== Schedule ===
2026 WNBA playoffs
Round One

Date	Time (ET)	Matchup			TV	Result	High points	High rebounds	High assists	Location
Sunday, September 27	2:00 p.m.	New York	@	Minnesota	ABC	91–75	Stewart (34)	Stewart (12)	Tied (6)	Target Center; 12,339
Sunday, September 27	4:00 p.m.	Indiana	@	Las Vegas	ABC	85–102	Wilson (34)	Wilson (16)	Tied (10)	Michelob Ultra Arena; 10,207
Sunday, September 27	7:00 p.m.	Washington	@	Atlanta	Prime	77–92	R. Howard (26)	Austin (16)	Canada (10)	State Farm Arena; 9,766
Sunday, September 27	9:00 p.m.	Dallas	@	Golden State	USA Network, CNBC	80–104	Zandalasini (22)	Stokes (8)	Sims (7)	Chase Center; 18,064
Tuesday, September 29	6:30 p.m.	Las Vegas	@	Indiana	Prime	89–99	Young (31)	Wilson (9)	C. Clark (15)	Gainbridge Fieldhouse; 16,298
Tuesday, September 29	8:30 p.m.	Minnesota	@	New York	USA Network, CNBC	71–87	Tied (21)	J. Jones (13)	Ionescu (7)	Barclays Center; 17,593
Wednesday, September 30	7:00 p.m.	Atlanta	@	Washington	ESPN	93–75	Citron (25)	Iriafen (16)	Canada (11)	CareFirst Arena; 4,200
Wednesday, September 30	9:00 p.m.	Golden State	@	Dallas	ESPN	100–108 (OT)	Ogunbowale (45)	Shepard (8)	G. Williams (7)	College Park Center; 6,251
Thursday, October 1	9:00 p.m.	Indiana	@	Las Vegas	USA Network, CNBC	83–94	Wilson (36)	Hines-Allen (12)	Young (7)	Michelob Ultra Arena; 10,388
Friday, October 2	9:00 p.m.	Dallas	@	Golden State	ESPN2	73–77	Ogunbowale (30)	Stokes (13)	Tied (6)	Chase Center; 18,064

Semifinals

Date	Time (ET)	Matchup			TV	Result	High points	High rebounds	High assists	Location
Sunday, October 4	2:00 p.m.	New York	@	Atlanta	ABC	82–92	Ionescu (27)	J. Jones (11)	R. Howard (8)	State Farm Arena; 9,745
Sunday, October 4	4:00 p.m.	Las Vegas	@	Golden State	NBC	60–71	G. Williams (25)	Stokes (14)	Tied (5)	Chase Center; 18,064
Wednesday, October 7	7:30 p.m.	New York	@	Atlanta	ESPN	98–101 (OT)	Stewart (35)	Stewart (11)	Canada (8)	State Farm Arena; 9,574
Wednesday, October 7	9:30 p.m.	Las Vegas	@	Golden State	Peacock, NBCSN	81–83	Wilson (24)	Brown (8)	Young (8)	Chase Center; 18,064
Friday, October 9	7:30 p.m.	Atlanta	@	New York	ESPN2	85–83	Tied (26)	J. Jones (14)	Canada (11)	Barclays Center; 17,991
Friday, October 9	9:30 p.m.	Golden State	@	Las Vegas	Peacock, NBCSN	87–77 (OT)	Wilson (21)	Tied (10)	C. Gray (5)	Michelob Ultra Arena; 10,218

Finals

Date	Time (ET)	Matchup			TV	Result	High points	High rebounds	High assists	Location
Saturday, October 17	3:30 p.m.	Atlanta	@	Golden State	NBC	64–68	G. Williams (26)	Reese (12)	Canada (7)	Chase Center; 18,064
Monday, October 19	8:00 p.m.	Atlanta	@	Golden State	USA Network, CNBC	79–65	Reese (30)	Reese (16)	Canada (10)	Chase Center; 18,064
Wednesday, October 21	8:00 p.m.	Golden State	@	Atlanta	USA Network, CNBC	71–97	Reese (21)	Reese (12)	Tied (8)	State Farm Arena; 17,099
Saturday, October 24	1:00 p.m.	Golden State	@	Atlanta	NBC	67–62	R. Howard (19)	Stokes (16)	Burton (5)	State Farm Arena; 17,099
Monday, October 26	8:00 p.m.	Atlanta	@	Golden State	USA Network, Peacock, CNBC	55–64	R. Howard (20)	Reese (15)	Tied (5)	Chase Center; 18,064
Thursday, October 29	12:30 p.m.	Golden State	@	Atlanta	USA Network, Peacock, CNBC	69–80	G. Williams (26)	Reese (14)	Reese (6)	State Farm Arena; 17,099
Saturday, October 31	8:00 p.m.	Atlanta	@	Golden State	USA Network, CNBC	63–68	G. Williams (30)	Stokes (13)	Tied (5)	Chase Center; 18,064

== Awards ==
=== Players of the Week ===
Week	Eastern Conference		Western Conference		Ref.
Week	Player	Team	Player	Team	Ref.
1	Breanna Stewart	New York Liberty	A'ja Wilson	Las Vegas Aces	
2	Rhyne Howard	Atlanta Dream	Kelsey Plum	Los Angeles Sparks	
3	Marina Mabrey	Toronto Tempo	Jessica Shepard	Dallas Wings	
4	Breanna Stewart (2)	New York Liberty	Olivia Miles	Minnesota Lynx	
5	Caitlin Clark	Indiana Fever	A'ja Wilson (2)	Las Vegas Aces	
6	Sonia Citron	Washington Mystics	Jessica Shepard (2)	Dallas Wings	
7	Marina Mabrey (2)	Toronto Tempo	Natasha Howard	Minnesota Lynx	
8	Kelsey Mitchell	Indiana Fever	Paige Bueckers	Dallas Wings	
9	Caitlin Clark (2)	Indiana Fever	Kayla McBride	Minnesota Lynx	
10	Caitlin Clark (3)	Indiana Fever	A'ja Wilson (3)	Las Vegas Aces	
11	Shakira Austin	Washington Mystics	Kayla McBride (2)	Minnesota Lynx	
12	Caitlin Clark (4)	Indiana Fever	Olivia Miles (2)	Minnesota Lynx	
13	Angel Reese	Atlanta Dream	A'ja Wilson (4)	Las Vegas Aces	
14	Angel Reese (2)	Atlanta Dream	Veronica Burton	Golden State Valkyries	
15	Angel Reese (3)	Atlanta Dream	A'ja Wilson (5)	Las Vegas Aces	

=== Players of the Month ===
Month	Eastern Conference		Western Conference		Ref.
Month	Player	Team	Player	Team	Ref.
May	Allisha Gray	Atlanta Dream	A'ja Wilson	Las Vegas Aces	
June	Caitlin Clark	Indiana Fever	A'ja Wilson (2)	Las Vegas Aces	
July	Kelsey Mitchell	Indiana Fever	A'ja Wilson (3)	Las Vegas Aces	
August	Kelsey Mitchell (2)	Indiana Fever	A'ja Wilson (4)	Las Vegas Aces	

=== Rookies of the Month ===
Month	Player	Team	Ref.
May	Olivia Miles	Minnesota Lynx	
June	Olivia Miles (2)	Minnesota Lynx	
July	Olivia Miles (3)	Minnesota Lynx	
August	Olivia Miles (4)	Minnesota Lynx	

=== Coaches of the Month ===
Month	Coach	Team	Ref.
May	Alex Sarama	Portland Fire	
June	Cheryl Reeve	Minnesota Lynx	
July	Stephanie White	Indiana Fever	
August	Natalie Nakase	Golden State Valkyries	

=== Individual ===
Award		Winner	Team	Position	Votes/Statistic (Note: "Votes" listed are first-place votes, except as noted, although the winners for all WNBA awards apart from the statistically based Peak Performer Awards are determined by points earned rather than only first-place votes.)	Ref.
Peak Performers	Points	A'ja Wilson	Las Vegas Aces	Center	26.2 ppg	
Peak Performers	Rebounds	Angel Reese	Atlanta Dream	Forward	12.1 rpg	
Peak Performers	Assists	Alyssa Thomas	Phoenix Mercury	Forward	8.5 apg	
Coach of the Year		Cheryl Reeve	Minnesota Lynx	Head Coach	40 out of 74	
Rookie of the Year		Olivia Miles	Minnesota Lynx	Point Guard	74 out of 74	
Most Improved Player		Jessica Shepard	Dallas Wings	Forward	29 out of 74	
Defensive Player of the Year		Angel Reese	Atlanta Dream	Forward	46 out of 74	
Sixth Player of the Year		Janelle Salaün	Golden State Valkyries	Forward	74 out of 74	
Most Valuable Player (MVP)		A'ja Wilson	Las Vegas Aces	Center	65 out of 74	
Executive of the Year		Cheryl Reeve	Minnesota Lynx	General Manager	13 ballots	
Kim Perrot Sportsmanship Award		Nneka Ogwumike	Los Angeles Sparks	Power Foward	38 out of 74	
WNBA Finals Most Valuable Player		Gabby Williams	Golden State Valkyries	Foward		

=== Team ===
Team		Members					Ref.
All-Rookie Team	Pauline Astier*	Azzi Fudd	Flau'jae Johnson	Olivia Miles	Kiki Rice*	Sydney Taylor	
All-Defensive	First Team	Shakira Austin	Rhyne Howard	Angel Reese	Gabby Williams	A'ja Wilson	
All-Defensive	Second Team	Veronica Burton	Jordin Canada	Sonia Citron	Breanna Stewart	Kiah Stokes	
All-WNBA	First Team	Caitlin Clark	Olivia Miles	Kelsey Mitchell	Breanna Stewart	A'ja Wilson	
All-WNBA	Second Team	Shakira Austin	Paige Bueckers	Rhyne Howard	Angel Reese	Jackie Young	

(*) Players tied for fifth spot

== Media coverage ==
=== United States ===
This was the first season of new 11-year media rights agreements with the ESPN family of networks, NBC Sports, and Amazon Prime Video. At a combined value of approximately $2.2 billion over the length of these three agreements, it was a substantial increase from the league's previous broadcast contracts.

Due to NBC's deal being signed in 2024 before NBCUniversal spun off most of its domestic cable networks to Versant in January 2026, the league signed a separate 11-year agreement for expanded coverage on USA Network.

This was also the first season of new multi-year deals with CBS Sports and Scripps Sports.

- ESPN aired 30 regular-season games, with 12 weekend afternoon games on ABC, and 18 games on ESPN on Tuesday and Sunday nights, in addition to Saturday and Sunday afternoons. ABC aired the 2026 WNBA All-Star Game in primetime, while ESPN aired the Skills Challenge and 3-Point Contest. During the playoffs, ESPN aired two first round series and one semifinal series.
- NBC Sports aired 22 regular-season games. Seven Sunday games aired on NBC and Peacock, with two airing in primetime under the Sunday Night Basketball banner introduced earlier for the NBA. Fifteen games aired on NBCSN, primarily on Monday nights. During the playoffs, NBC Sports aired one semifinal series, and games 1 and 4 of the Finals. All games streamed on Peacock.
- USA Network aired 48 regular season games, primarily on Monday and Wednesday nights, and nine games over the eight days of the regular season. During the playoffs, USA Network broadcast one first round series and the remaining games of the WNBA Finals not on NBC. Selected games on USA Network were streamed by Peacock.
- Amazon Prime Video aired 30 regular season games, primarily on Thursday nights, as well as the championship game of the WNBA Commissioner's Cup. During the playoffs, Prime Video aired one first round series.
- Ion Television aired 50 Friday night games throughout the season. Select games aired in regional windows with out-of-market games on WNBA League Pass.
- CBS Sports aired 20 regular season games on CBS and Paramount+, with eight on Saturday nights and the rest on weekend afternoons. Unlike the previous agreement, CBS Sports Network no longer airs games.
- NBA TV aired 15 games.

=== Canada ===
- This was the first season of a multi-year deal between the WNBA and Bell Media's TSN in Canada, including various regular season games, the All-Star Game, and coverage of the WNBA playoffs, finals, and draft.
- Unlike the WNBA's other US media rights agreements, its deal with Amazon Prime Video is a global deal and the streaming service will also air games in Canada.
- As in past seasons, NBA TV Canada continues to carry selected games not covered by the Bell Media and Prime Video deals.

=== Local ===
- The Toronto Tempo announced an agreement with Bell Media to serve as its regional broadcaster, broadcasting the majority of its games (aside from those covered under Prime Video's global rights deal) on TSN. Selected games were also simulcast by CTV and streaming on Crave.
- The Minnesota Lynx announced a new agreement with Victory+ for free streaming of all regional games.
- The Portland Fire, in their inaugural season, announced an agreement with Gray Media to make KPDX the teams local broadcast partner.
- The Atlanta Dream also announced an agreement with Victory+ for free streaming. Unlike the Lynx, games will continue to air on TV through an agreement with Gray Media.
