= WNBA on USA =

- Genre: WNBA basketball telecasts
- Directed by: Ted Ballard; Liz Donovan (studio director)
- Country of origin: United States
- Original language: English
- No. of seasons: 1

Production
- Executive producer: Jeff Behnke
- Producer: Ted Ballard (coordinating producer)
- Production location: Various WNBA arenas (game telecasts)
- Camera setup: Multi-camera
- Running time: 120 minutes+
- Production company: USA Sports

Original release
- Network: USA Network; CNBC (overflow); Peacock
- Release: May 10, 2026 – present

Related
- WNBA on NBC; NBA on USA

The WNBA on USA is an American television sports presentation show broadcast by USA Network. It has aired since May 10, 2026. It consists of branding used for the presentation of Women's National Basketball Association games. The new deal essentially replaces USA Network's portion of a previously announced deal between the WNBA and NBC.

== Background ==
On July 23, 2024, NBC parent company Comcast confirmed in a conference call with its investors that NBC Sports had secured an agreement with the WNBA on an eleven-year media rights deal beginning in the 2026 season, marking the WNBA's return to NBC after a 24-year absence. An official announcement of the agreement was released by the NBA and NBC the following day, alongside other deals with incumbents ABC/ESPN and Amazon.

The agreement was initially going to see games broadcast on NBC, USA Network and streaming on Peacock, however in November 2024, Comcast announced that it would spin-off most of its cable networks, including USA Network, into Versant, with the games only airing on NBC and Peacock. In September 2025, Versant also secured an eleven-year agreement with the WNBA to air fifty games on USA, alongside the NBCUniversal, Disney and Amazon deals.

== Coverage ==
Beginning with the 2026 season, USA Sports will air approximately 48 regular season games, primarily on Wednesday and Monday nights. In addition, to end the regular season, USA Network will air nine games over the season's final eight days. During the playoffs, USA Network will broadcast one first round series and all games except 1 and 4 of the WNBA Finals in 2026, 2030, and 2034. Select games on USA Network will stream on Peacock.

On June 17, Versant announced that 11 WNBA games this season will be simulcast in full on CNBC. Most of it were late games in USA Network's doubleheader windows, as an alternative in case of overlap between games.

== Commentators ==
=== Play-by-play ===
- Kate Scott: primary (2026–present)
- Meghan McPeak: secondary (2026–present)
- Carlan Gay: secondary (2026–present)

=== Game analyst ===
- Sarah Kustok: primary color analyst (2026–present)
- Amy Audibert: secondary color analyst (2026–present)
- Tamika Catchings: secondary color analyst (2026–present)
- Lea B. Olsen: secondary color analyst (2026–present)
- Edona Thaqi: select games color analyst (2026–present)

=== Sideline reporters ===
- Paris Lawson: primary sideline reporter (2026–present)
- Terrika Foster-Brasby: secondary sideline reporter (2026–present)
- Edona Thaqi: secondary sideline reporter (2026–present)

=== Studio host ===
- Elle Duncan: primary studio host (2026–present)

=== Studio analyst ===
- Renee Montgomery: primary studio analyst (2026–present)
- Chamique Holdsclaw: primary studio analyst (2026–present)
- Sophie Cunningham: contributor and studio analyst (2026)

== See also ==
- Women's_National_Basketball_Association#Media_coverage
- USA_Network#Sports_programming
