= Sarah Kustok =

American sports reporter

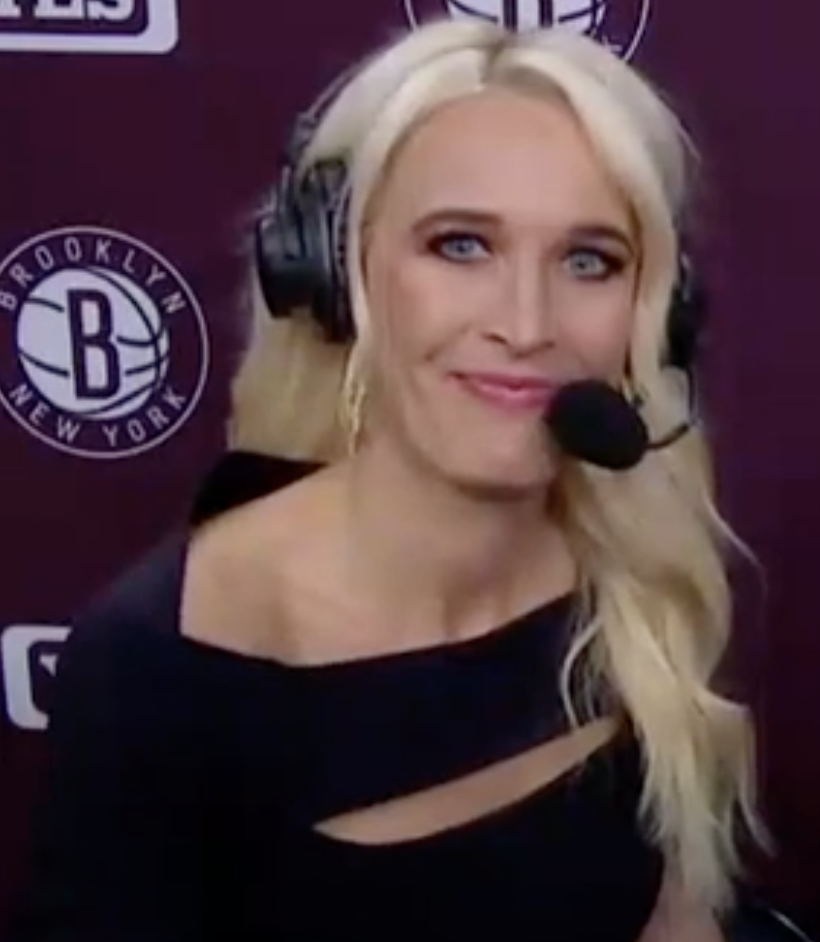
- Kustok at the Barclays Center in 2020
- Born: December 17, 1981 (age 44); Orland Park, Illinois, U.S.
- Education: DePaul University
- Occupation: Sports journalist
- Years active: 2005–present
- Employer(s): NBC/USA Sports; YES Network; Fox Sports

Sarah Grace Kustok (/ˈkuːˌstɒk/ KOO-stok; born December 17, 1981) is an American sports reporter who works for the YES Network and Fox Sports. She is the lead color commentator for WNBA telecasts on NBC and USA. In 2017, she became the first female full-time analyst for an NBA team's local TV broadcasts when the YES Network promoted her from sideline analyst for Brooklyn Nets games.

== Biography ==
Kustok attended DePaul University and played on the Blue Demons women's basketball team from the 2000-01 season through the 2003-04 season. She appeared in 118 career games and averaged more than six points per game.

After college, Kustok began her career as an analyst and sideline reporter for ESPN and Fox Sports, covering college football, men's and women's basketball, and high school football. She also worked as a TV sideline reporter for the Chicago Bulls, Blackhawks, Cubs, White Sox and Fire for Comcast SportsNet Chicago, was a substitute anchor for the network, and filled in as sports anchor for WMAQ-TV. She has hosted College Sports Minute and was a freelance sports anchor/reporter for WFLD-TV.

She also worked for Versus. She has served as the color commentator for the WNBA's Connecticut Sun home games and for Game 1 of the 2026 WNBA Finals on NBC. She also is the substitute anchor and contributor on FS1's First Things First. Kustok previously worked as a sideline reporter with the Brooklyn Nets (succeeding Michelle Beadle) before being promoted to TV analyst in 2017, making her the NBA's first woman in that role.

She also contributes to Nets Magazine.

== DePaul statistics ==
Legend
GP	Games played	GS	Games started	MPG	Minutes per game
FG%	Field goal percentage	3P%	3-point field goal percentage	FT%	Free throw percentage
RPG	Rebounds per game	APG	Assists per game	SPG	Steals per game
BPG	Blocks per game	PPG	Points per game	**Bold**	Career high

Year	Team	GP	Points	FG%	3P%	FT%	RPG	APG	SPG	BPG	PPG
2000–01	DePaul	29	111	41.4%	38.9%	69.4%	1.9	0.9	0.4	0.0	3.8
2001–02	DePaul	27	194	37.3%	36.4%	74.2%	4.4	1.8	0.9	–	**7.2**
2002–03	DePaul	**32**	**212**	**44.7%**	**44.5%**	**86.4%**	3.9	1.5	1.0	0.1	6.6
2003–04	DePaul	30	192	36.6%	35.9%	81.3%	**3.9**	**1.9**	**1.0**	–	6.4
Career		118	709	39.7%	38.8%	76.9%	3.5	1.5	0.9	0.0	6.0

== Personal life ==
Kustok grew up in Orland Park, Illinois, where she played high school volleyball and basketball. She later attended DePaul University. Her older brother, Zak, is a businessman who formerly played quarterback for the Northwestern Wildcats football team.

Sarah's father, Allan Kustok, was tried for the shooting and killing of Anita "Jeanie" Kustok, her mother, while she slept in their home in 2010. Sarah testified before the jury, and maintained her father's innocence in March 2014. Allan was convicted of first degree murder and is currently serving a 60-year prison sentence.
