= Meghan McPeak =

Canadian play-by-play broadcaster

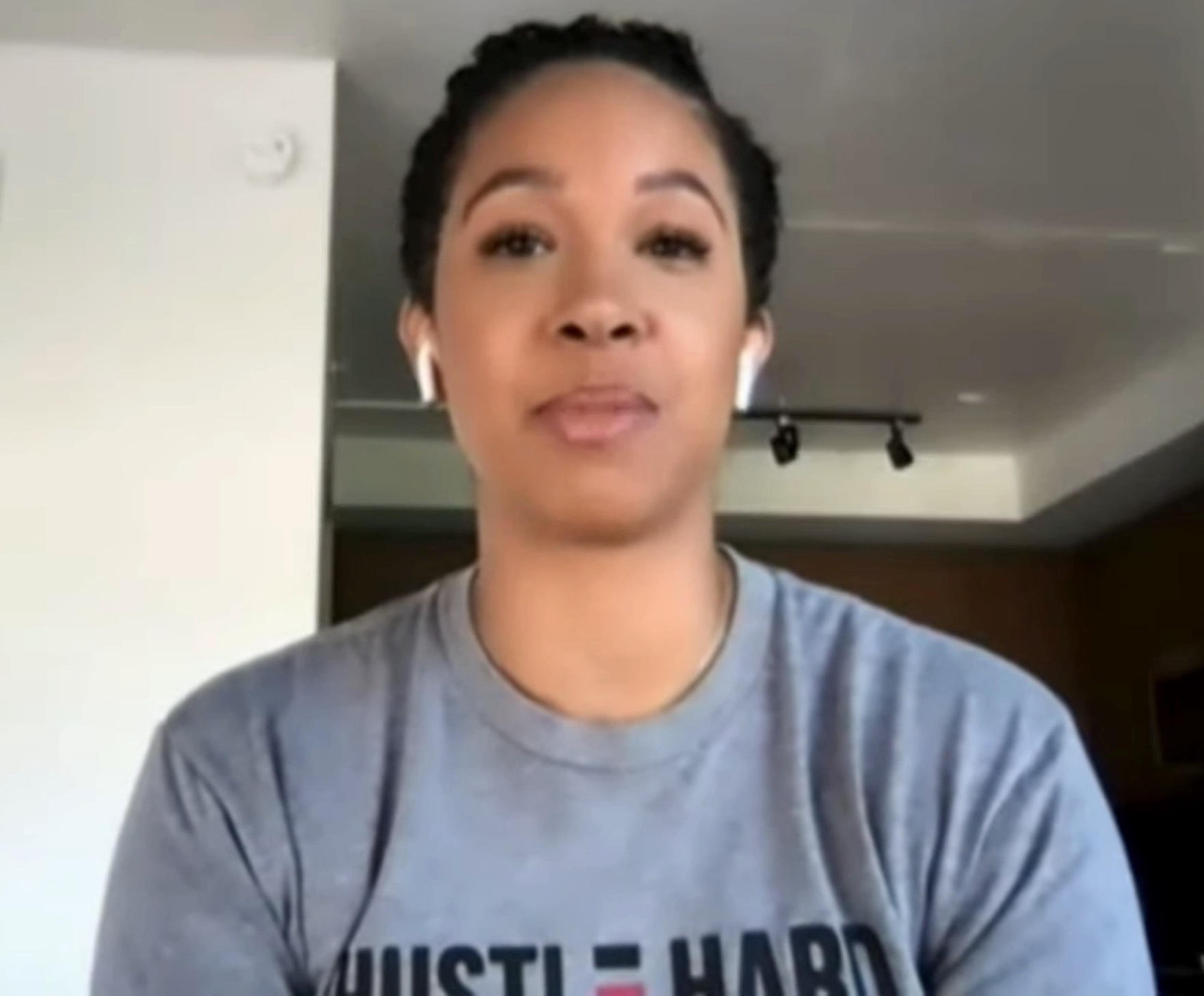
- McPeak in 2021
- Occupation: Play-by-play broadcaster
- Employer: NBC Sports
- Organization(s): Washington Mystics, Washington Wizards
- Website: meghanmcpeak.com

Meghan McPeak is a Canadian basketball play-by-play broadcaster, currently calling games for the Washington Mystics of the WNBA. She previously called games for the Washington Wizards of the NBA and the Capital City Go-Go of the NBA G League. She became the first female broadcaster to call an NBA game in over 30 years when she called a pre-season Washington Wizards game in October 2018.

== Career ==
McPeak studied radio broadcasting at Humber College in Toronto, while playing as a point guard on the college's women's basketball team.

In 2015, she became the first female play-by-play broadcaster in the NBA G-League when she was hired by the Raptors 905. With the Raptors, she also hosted pre-game and post-game shows for the NBA team. In 2018, she was hired by the Washington Wizards to call games for their G-League affiliate, the Capital City Go-Go.

In 2022, she joined CBS Sports as a play-by-play announcer for college football, calling UConn games.

== See also ==
- List of current Women's National Basketball Association broadcasters
