= Mary Murphy (basketball) =

American basketball analyst (born 1957)

Mary Ellen Murphy (born December 12, 1957) is a basketball analyst who calls college and WNBA games for ESPN, BTN, and Pac-12 Network and select high school games for Comcast SportsNet California and Comcast SportsNet Bay Area. She has also worked with FSN.

== Early life ==
Murphy was born and raised in Chicago, Illinois. She kept to her Chicago roots and attended Northwestern University from 1977 to 1980, acting as a two-year captain for the women's basketball team. During her senior season, Murphy was a finalist for the Wade Trophy as one of the top players in the nation.

== Coaching career ==
After graduating from college, Murphy served as a student graduate assistant at the University of Notre Dame for three seasons while earning a master's degree in business administration. She then moved to Notre Dame as an assistant coach for two year. Murphy was hired as head coach at the University of Wisconsin-Madison in 1986. In 1992 she led the Badgers to their first NCAA Tournament appearance, compiling a 20–9 overall record and a 13–5 conference record in the Big Ten. Over eight seasons Murphy compiled an 87–135 record at Wisconsin. Her time at Wisconsin was not without controversy. At least one player sued Murphy claiming she had caused her emotional harm and caused her to leave the team. The charges were eventually dropped by the courts. After leaving Wisconsin, Murphy became the head coach at Cal State Hayward from 1995 to 1996.

Murphy left college coaching to become the first head coach and the general manager of the WNBA's Sacramento Monarchs in 1997. Murphy would coach the team for the first 15 games, compiling a 5–10 record, before being fired in the midst of a 5-game losing streak that dropped the Monarchs from first to third in their division.

== Broadcasting ==
Upon being let go by the Monarchs, Murphy was hired by Brian Donlon, Lifetime Television's vice president of sports and executive producer, to be part of its WNBA broadcast team along with Michele Tafoya and Reggie Miller. Murphy started with her own halftime feature, "Murphy's Law" before joining Miller and Tafoya as a game analyst. When Lifetime ended its WNBA broadcasts in 1999, Murphy moved to ESPN for women's NCAA tournament games and WNBA broadcasts while FOX would bring her on board to call the Pac-12 women's games on FSN in the early 2000s. Others would follow suit. In 2007 Murphy was hired as one of BTN's announcers, and in 2012 she was hired as an analyst for Pac-12 Network. Today Murphy continues to act as an analyst for first round NCAA women's tournament games on ESPN, girls high school championship broadcasts on Comcast, Monday Night's BTN game of the week, select Pac-12 games, and as color analyst for the Los Angeles Sparks on Spectrum SportsNet.

== Head coaching record ==
=== WNBA ===
Legend
Regular season	G	Games coached	W	Games won	L	Games lost	W–L %	Win–loss %
Playoffs	PG	Playoff games	PW	Playoff wins	PL	Playoff losses	PW–L %	Playoff win–loss %

Team	Year	G	W	L	W–L%	Finish	PG	PW	PL	PW–L%	Result
Sacramento	1997	15	5	10	.333	(replaced)	—	—	—	—	—
