= USA Sports (2025–present) =

Sports division of the USA TV channel in the U.S.

- Network: USA Network; CNBC; Golf Channel; Fandango
- Launched: November 12, 2025; 12 months ago
- Country of origin: United States
- Owner: Versant
- Key people: Mark Lazarus (CEO, Versant)
- Headquarters: New York City
- Major broadcasting contracts: Olympics (sublicensed from NBC Sports); NCAA basketball; NCAA football; Golf; U.S. Open; The Open; EPL (Select games broadcast on NBC); Bundesliga (including Super Cup); NASCAR (select NASCAR Cup Series races broadcast on NBC); WNBA; WWE (SmackDown)
- Official website: usanetwork.com/sports

USA Sports is an American programming division for Versant that is responsible for sports broadcasts on USA Network, CNBC, Golf Channel and the Fandango streaming service. The division launched on November 12, 2025.

== Overview ==
On November 20, 2024, Comcast announced that it would spin off most of its cable networks and select digital properties into a new publicly traded company, Versant, which would be controlled by Comcast shareholders. Included in the spin off were USA Network, CNBC and Golf Channel, all of which previously aired sports content from NBC Sports.

When asked about the impact of the spin-off, NBC Sports president Rick Cordella stated that the division would "fulfill every obligation" it has with networks that are part of the spin-off (such as USA Network and Golf Channel), implicating they would still carry NBC Sports programming covered under current contracts (such as the Olympic Games, PGA Tour and WNBA).

On August 12, 2025, NBC Sports and Versant announced a renewal of their rights to USGA championships through 2032: NBC would maintain its broadcast television rights to the U.S. Open, U.S. Women's Open, and U.S. Senior Open, USA Network would hold the rights to 35 hours of coverage from the U.S. Open and U.S. Women's Open, while Golf Channel would hold exclusive and "expanded" rights to all other USGA championships.

On September 16, 2025, Versant announced an agreement with League One Volleyball to broadcast a "match of the week" on USA Network on Wednesday nights beginning in January 2026, as well as coverage of the league’s playoffs and championship. The coverage would be produced by Peyton and Eli Manning's Omaha Productions. On September 30, 2025, Versant announced a new agreement with the WNBA for 50 regular season games, along with select playoff games. The new deal essentially replaced USA Network's portion of a previously-announced deal between the WNBA and NBC.

In November 2025, USA Sports announced an agreement with the Pac-12 Conference to broadcast 22 regular season college football games, up to 10 regular season women's college basketball games, 50 regular season men's college basketball games, and all games, except the final, of the Pac-12 Conference men's basketball tournament. As with its package on The CW, the telecasts are produced by the conference's media department Pac-12 Enterprises.

On November 12, 2025, Versant officially announced the USA Sports brand. Versant also confirmed that USA Sports would hold a portion of the rights, previously held by NBC Sports, to the NASCAR Cup Series, PGA Tour, Premier League, WWE SmackDown, The Open Championship and the AIG Women's Open, LPGA Tour, PGA of America, Atlantic 10 Conference and DP World Tour. On November 24, 2025, an agreement was confirmed for NBC Sports-produced coverage of the 2026 Winter Olympics to air on Versant networks such as USA and CNBC.

In March 2026, the PGA of America renewed an existing agreement with NBC Sports and USA Sports through 2033, encompassing rights to the biennial Ryder Cup, and various PGA professional championships (excluding the PGA Championship, which is broadcast by CBS and ESPN as part of a separate contract). In June 2026, USA Sports announced that 11 WNBA games scheduled to air on USA Network would be simulcast on CNBC. All 11 games will be the second game in a weekday doubleheader. In July, USA Sports announced an agreement with the Pro Padel League to put Sunday championship matches from five PDL events on CNBC. Later in July, Versant announced a five-year agreement with the Bundesliga. 30 matches per season would air on USA Network, and the remainder would air on the Fandango streaming service, marking its expansion into sports.

== Rights ==
=== Current rights ===
- Atlantic 10 Conference (2025–present)
  - More than 40 regular season A-10 men's and women's college basketball games on USA Network
  - Select games from the Atlantic 10 Conference men's and women's basketball tournament on USA Network and CNBC
- Pac-12 Conference (2026–present)
  - 22 regular season football games
  - Over 50 regular season men's and women's basketball games
  - Select games from the Pac-12 men's and women's basketball tournaments
- NASCAR Cup Series (2026–present)
  - 10 Cup Series races annually
  - Produces additional four races that air on NBC and Peacock
  - Co-produces 5 Cup races on Amazon Prime
- PGA Tour (2026–present)
  - Coverage of 45 PGA Tour events on Golf Channel
  - Exclusive live linear coverage of the PGA Tour Champions and Korn Ferry Tour
  - Golf Channel Games (2025)
- Premier League (2026–present)
  - More than 175 matches on USA Network
- Pro Padel League (2026)
  - Sunday championship matches from five PDL events on CNBC
- WWE (2026–present)
  - WWE SmackDown
- United States Golf Association (2026–present)
  - 35 hours of U.S. Open and U.S. Women's Open coverage on USA Network
  - Exclusive coverage of the U.S. Amateur, U.S. Women's Amateur, U.S. Junior Amateur, U.S. Girls' Junior, U.S. Senior Women's Open, U.S. Adaptive Open, Walker Cup, and Curtis Cup on Golf Channel.
- League One Volleyball (2026–present)
  - Match of the Week in primetime on Wednesday nights on USA Network
  - LOVB Championship Match on USA Network
- Women's National Basketball Association (2026–present)
  - 50 Wednesday regular season games on USA Network
  - Select WNBA playoff games including select games from the WNBA Finals in 2026, 2030, and 2034.
- The R&A (2026–present)
  - The Open Championship and AIG Women's Open on USA Network
  - Senior Open Championship on Golf Channel
- LPGA Tour (2026–present)
  - Coverage of every LPGA Tour event on Golf Channel or CNBC
  - Exclusive coverage of Ladies European Tour on Golf Channel
- PGA of America (2026–present)
  - Ryder Cup on USA Network
  - Women's PGA Championship, PGA Works Collegiate Championship and PGA Professional Championship on Golf Channel
- NCAA Golf (2026–present)
  - Men's and women's NCAA Championships, St Andrews Links Collegiate and East Lake Cup on Golf Channel
- Bundesliga (2026–present)
  - At least 30 games on USA Network, with all remaining games on Fandango
  - Franz Beckenbauer Supercup
- World TeamTennis (2026–present)
  - Six games on CNBC and Fandango
  - Other integrations on E!
- 2026 Winter Olympics (2026) — NBC Sports–produced coverage of the Milan Cortina Games on USA Network and CNBC, sublicensed from NBC Sports
- DP World Tour (2026–present) — coverage on Golf Channel through 2030

=== Former rights ===
- Babe Ruth League (Major/70) (2025)
  - U.S., International and World Championship on CNBC

== See also ==
- NBC Sports on USA Network
- NBC Sports
