= WNBA on NBC =

- Logo used since 2026
- Also known as: WNBA Gametime; NBC Sunday Night Basketball
- Genre: WNBA basketball telecasts
- Directed by: Jenny Glazer
- Starring: Zora Stephenson; Sarah Kustok; Ashley ShahAhmadi; Noah Eagle; Michael Grady; Kate Scott; LaChina Robinson; Jordan Cornette; Caroline Pineda; Maria Taylor; Sue Bird; Cheryl Miller
- Theme music composer: John Tesh (main theme); Alex Hitchens; Elvis Presley (Sunday Night Basketball opening theme)
- Opening theme: "Roundball Rock" (main theme); A Little Less Conversation by Lenny Kravitz (Sunday Night Basketball opening theme)
- Country of origin: United States
- Original language: English
- No. of seasons: 6

Production
- Executive producers: Sam Flood; Dick Ebersol (1997-2002)
- Producers: Betsy Riley; Molly Solomon
- Production location: Various WNBA arenas (game telecasts)
- Camera setup: Multi-camera
- Running time: 120 minutes+
- Production company: NBC Sports

Original release
- Network: NBC
- Release: June 21, 1997 – August 31, 2002
- Network: NBC; USA Network (finals only); NBCSN; Peacock; Telemundo, TeleXitos and Universo (Spanish audio/broadcast)
- Release: May 17, 2026 – present

Related
- NBA on NBC; WNBA on USA; WNBA on Oxygen

The WNBA on NBC is an American television sports presentation show broadcast by NBC. It aired initially from June 21, 1997 to August 31, 2002. It consists of branding used for the presentation of Women's National Basketball Association games.

NBC showed Women's National Basketball Association games from 1997 to 2002 as part of their NBA on NBC coverage before the league transferred the rights to ABC/ESPN. NBC's coverage of the WNBA was set to return in 2026 following along with the return of the NBA on NBC. The games will be branded as the WNBA on NBC/Peacock.

== History ==
On June 27, 1996, NBC Sports was announced as the WNBA's first national broadcaster. The WNBA soon also had television deals in place with the Walt Disney Company and Hearst Corporation joint venture channels, ESPN and Lifetime Television Network, respectively. At the time, NBC didn't pay television rights fees to the league's teams. A more rock-oriented variant of John Tesh's theme, "Roundball Rock" introduced by NBC to coincide with the debut of the WNBA.

NBC nationally televised the first WNBA game on June 21, 1997. The game featured the New York Liberty facing the Los Angeles Sparks in Los Angeles. For NBC's final season with the WNBA in 2002, they again began their season's worth of coverage on Memorial Day weekend with the Liberty and Sparks. NBC would proceed to televise WNBA games on Saturday and Sunday afternoons culminating in the Championship game on August 30.

On July 23, 2024, NBC parent company Comcast confirmed in a conference call with its investors that NBC Sports had secured an agreement with the WNBA on an eleven-year media rights deal beginning in the 2026 season, marking the WNBA's return to NBC after a 24-year absence. An official announcement of the agreement was released by the NBA and NBC the following day, alongside other deals with incumbents ABC/ESPN and Amazon. The agreement was initially going to see games broadcast on NBC, USA Network and streaming on Peacock, however in November 2024, Comcast announced that it would spin-off most of its cable networks, including USA Network, into Versant, with the games only airing on NBC and Peacock. In September 2025, Versant also secured an eleven-year agreement with the WNBA to air fifty games on USA, alongside the NBCUniversal, Disney and Amazon deals. NBC will also gain exclusive broadcast rights to seven WNBA semifinals series and three WNBA Finals series.

== Ratings ==
NBC Sports' broadcast of the inaugural WNBA game between the Liberty and Sparks received a 3.8 overnight national rating. This would also serve as NBC's highest rated WNBA game. Although NBC's end-of-season average for 1999 was even with 1998's average, viewership had actually increased from 1,540,000 households in 1998 to 1,607,000 in 1999. On the same token however, Nielsen ratings for NBC broadcasts of WNBA games slipped from 2 million households reached in 1997—the WNBA's inaugural season—to 1.5 million in 1999.

The average rating for the first 9 of the 10 WNBA games NBC carried in the 2001 season was only 1.1, compared to a 2.0 rating its first season.

== WNBA Finals coverage ==
The first WNBA season concluded with what was at the time, a single championship game. The following year, the finale series into a best-of-three games series, with NBC airing the first two games and ESPN airing the decisive third game. In 1999, ESPN aired the first game of the championship series while NBC covered the following two. Come the year 2000, Lifetime temporarily assumed ESPN's role as the WNBA's cable outlet for the WNBA Championship. Like the year prior, Lifetime broadcast the first game while NBC covered the second and ultimately decisive game between the Houston Comets and New York Liberty. This marked Houston's fourth consecutive WNBA Championship.

ESPN returned to the fold in the year 2001, broadcasting the first game with NBC airing the second and decisive game between the Los Angeles Sparks and Charlotte Sting. For NBC's final year of coverage in 2002, ESPN2 this time, broadcast the first game with NBC again covering what would become the second and ultimately decisive game, which would be NBC's last WNBA telecast to date until 2026. NBC will gain exclusive broadcast rights to three WNBA Finals series in 2026, 2030, and 2034. Games 1 and 4 will air on NBC; Games 2, 3 and 5-7 will air on USA Network. Peacock will simulcast all WNBA Finals games airing on either NBC or USA Network.

== Announcers ==
During the WNBA's first season on NBC, the primary announcing team consisted of Hannah Storm calling the play-by-play with Ann Meyers doing the color commentary and Lisa Malosky assuming the role as sideline reporter. The following year, Storm receded her lead play-by-play duties to Tom Hammond, who would call NBC's coverage of the WNBA Finals with Ann Meyers in 1998 and in 2000. For the 1999 season and 2001 seasons, NBC used Mike Breen as their primary play-by-play announcer. For the WNBA's final season in 2002, Paul Sunderland worked with Meyers for their coverage of the WNBA Finals.

On June 23, 2025, NBC announced that Maria Taylor would serve as lead studio host. NBC later filled out its broadcast roster in April 2026.

=== Current ===
==== Play-by-play ====
- Zora Stephenson (lead) (2026–present)
- Noah Eagle (2026–present)
- Michael Grady (2026–present)
- Kate Scott (2026–present)

==== Color commentators ====
- Sarah Kustok: color commentator (2026–present)
- LaChina Robinson: color commentator and alternate studio host (2026–present)
- Derek Fisher: color commentator (2026–present)

==== Sideline reporters ====
- Ashley ShahAhmadi: sideline reporter (2026–present)
- Jordan Cornette: sideline reporter (2026–present)
- Caroline Pineda: sideline reporter (2026–present)

==== Studio personnel ====
- Maria Taylor: lead studio host (2026–present)
- LaChina Robinson: alternate studio host and color commentator (2026–present)
- Carolyn Manno: alternate studio host (2026–present)
- Sue Bird: lead studio analyst (2026–present)
- Cheryl Miller: lead studio analyst (2026–present)

=== Former ===
- Bruce Beck (sideline reporter)
- Mike Breen (play-by-play)
- Tom Hammond (play-by-play)
- Dan Hicks (studio host)
- Marion Jones (sideline reporter)
- Andrea Joyce (sideline reporter)
- Ann Meyers (color commentary)
- Lisa Malosky (sideline reporter)
- Ahmad Rashad (studio host)
- Summer Sanders (sideline reporter)
- Beth Ruyak (studio host)
- Hannah Storm (play-by-play, studio host)
- Paul Sunderland (play-by-play)
- Al Trautwig (sideline reporter)
- Chris Wragge (sideline reporter, studio host)

Preceded by League created	WNBA network broadcast partner 1997–2002	Succeeded by ABC
Preceded by None	WNBA network broadcast partner 2026–present with ABC and CBS	Succeeded by Incumbent
Preceded by CBSSN	WNBA pay television carrier 2026–present with ESPN and Prime Video	Succeeded by Incumbent
