= ESPN on ABC =

Branding for sports programming on ABC

- On-air logo used since August 28, 2022.
- Network: ABC; ESPN DTC; ESPN (select events)
- Launched: April 29, 1961; 65 years ago
- Country of origin: United States
- Owner: ESPN
- Key people: James Pitaro (chairman, ESPN); Debra O'Connell (chairwoman, Disney Entertainment Television)
- Headquarters: Bristol, Connecticut
- Major broadcasting contracts: NFL (Monday Night Football and playoffs); NHL (including playoffs); MLB; NBA (including playoffs); WNBA; NWSL; NCAA football (including College Football Playoff); NCAA basketball (including NCAA women's tournament); TGL; PLL; U.S. Open tennis; Wimbledon; LLWS; Formula E; Spanish La Liga; UFL; X Games
- Sister network: ESPN; ESPN2; ESPNews; ESPNU; ESPN Deportes; ACC Network; SEC Network; NFL Network; NFL RedZone
- Format: Sports
- Original languages: English; Spanish (SAP; select events)
- Official website: abc.com/collection/espn-on-abc

ESPN on ABC (formerly known as ABC Sports from 1961 to 2006) is the branding used for sports event and documentary programming produced by ESPN and primarily televised by the American broadcast network ABC. Despite its name, these telecasts are generally supplemental to ESPN, and only some of these broadcasts may be simulcast on its cable channels. However, almost all broadcast are available on ESPN's namesake streaming service. ESPN is majority owned by ABC's corporate parent, The Walt Disney Company, in partnership with Hearst Communications and the National Football League (NFL).

ABC Sports was established on April 29, 1961, as the broadcast network's sports division. When ABC acquired a controlling interest in ESPN in 1984, it operated the cable network separately from its network sports division. Disney then bought ABC in 1996 and began to consolidate the corporate structure of ABC Sports and ESPN. The merger of ABC's sports division into ESPN was completed in 2006, and the ESPN on ABC branding made its debut on September 2 of that year. The branding change was made to better orient ESPN viewers with event telecasts on ABC and provide consistent branding for all sports broadcasts on Disney-owned channels (shortly thereafter, ESPN2's in-game graphics were likewise altered to simply use the main "ESPN" brand).

ABC broadcasts use ESPN's production and announcing staff, and incorporate elements such as ESPN-branded on-screen graphics, SportsCenter in-game updates, and the BottomLine ticker. The ABC logo is still used for identification purposes such as a digital on-screen graphic during sports broadcasts on the network, and in promotions to disambiguate events airing the broadcast network from those shown on the ESPN cable channel.

Since 2021, ABC is currently the only Big Four network to have rights to broadcast games from all four major professional leagues at the same time, largely due to joint contracts with ESPN and those four leagues.

== History ==
=== 1960s: Roone Arledge, Wide World of Sports ===
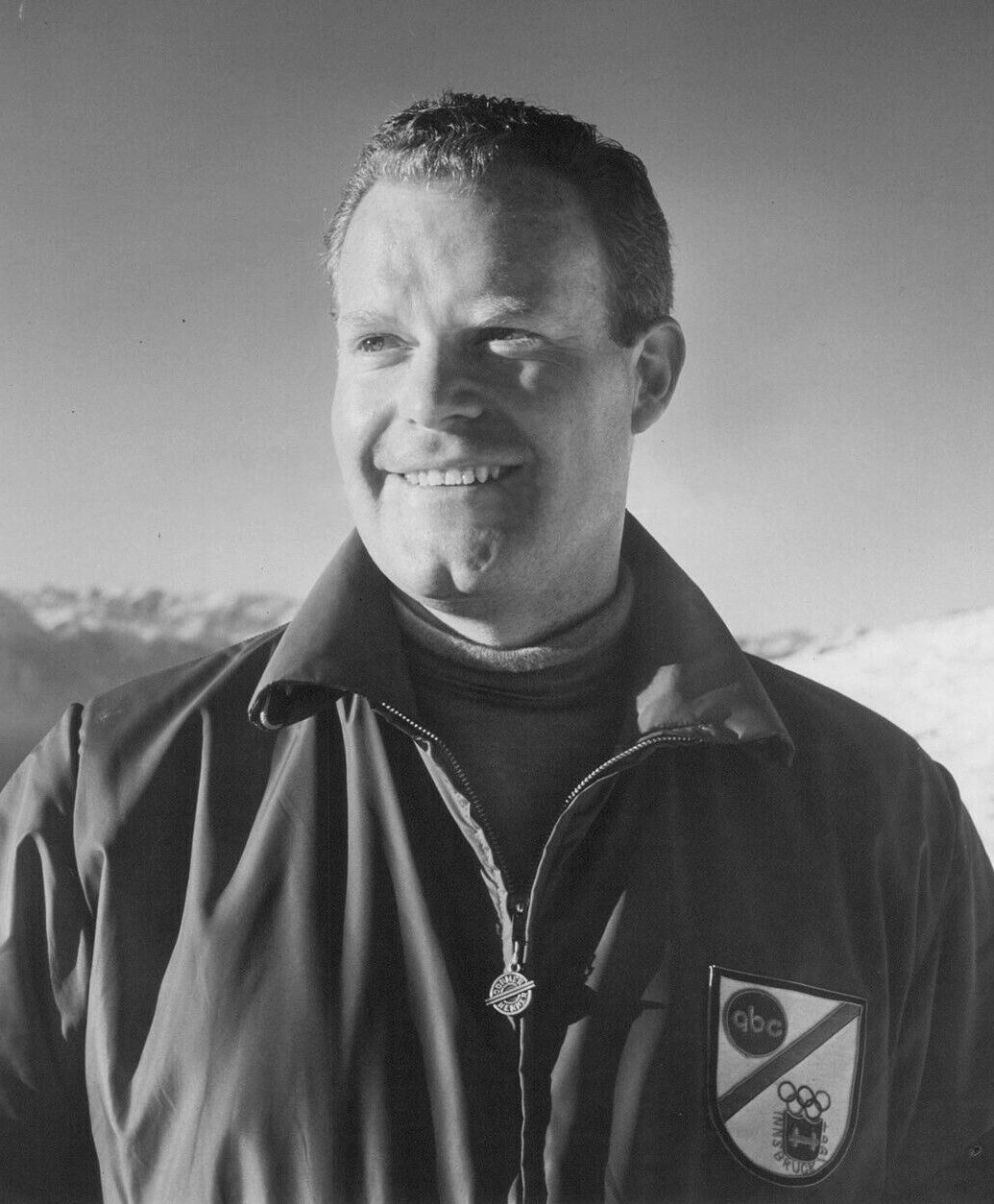
Roone Arledge with ABC Sports at the 1968 Winter Olympics

Like its longtime competitors CBS Sports and NBC Sports, ABC Sports was originally part of the news division of the ABC network, and, after 1961, was spun off into its own independent division.

When Roone Arledge came to ABC Sports as a producer of NCAA football games in 1960, the network was in financial shambles. The International Olympic Committee even wanted a bank to guarantee ABC's contract to broadcast the 1960 Olympics. At the time, Edgar Scherick served as the de facto head of ABC Sports. Scherick had joined the fledgling ABC television network when he persuaded it to purchase Sports Programs, Inc., in exchange for the network acquiring shares in the company. Scherick had formed the company after he left CBS, when the network would not make him the head of its sports programming unit (choosing to instead appoint former baseball public relations agent William C. MacPhail). Before ABC Sports even became a formal division of the network, Scherick and ABC programming chief Tom Moore pulled off many programming deals involving the most popular American sporting events.

While Scherick was not interested in "For Men Only," he recognized the talent that Arledge had. Arledge realized ABC was the organization he was looking to become part of. The lack of a formal organization would offer him the opportunity to claim real power when the network matured. With this, he signed on with Scherick as an assistant producer, with Arledge eventually ascending to a role as executive producer of its sports telecasts.

Several months before ABC began broadcasting NCAA college football games, Arledge sent Scherick a remarkable memo filled with youthful exuberance and television production concepts which sports broadcasts have adhered to since. Network broadcasts of sporting events had previously consisted of simple set-ups and focused on the game itself. In his memo, Arledge not only offered another way to broadcast the game to the sports fan, but recognized that television had to take fans to the game. In addition, he had the forethought to realize that the broadcasts needed to attract, and hold the attention of, female viewers, as well as males. On September 17, 1960, the then-29-year-old Arledge put his vision into reality with ABC's first NCAA college football broadcast from Birmingham, Alabama, between the Alabama Crimson Tide and the Georgia Bulldogs which Alabama won, 21–6.

Despite the production values he brought to NCAA college football, Scherick wanted low-budget sports programming (as in inexpensive broadcasting rights) that could attract and retain an audience. He hit upon the idea of broadcasting track and field events sponsored by the Amateur Athletic Union. While Americans were not exactly fans of track and field events, Scherick figured that Americans understood games.

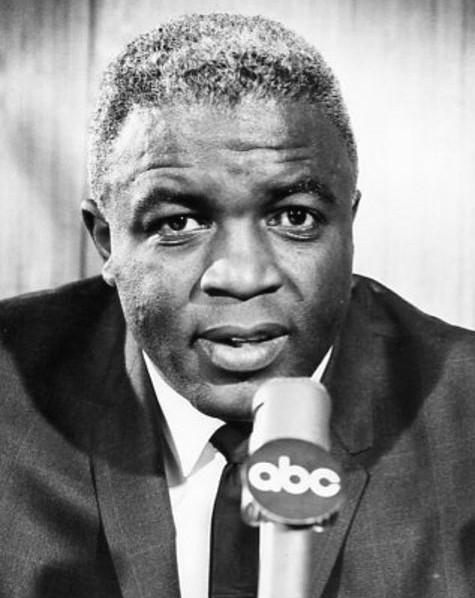
Jackie Robinson as an expert analyst for ABC Sports, 1965

In January 1961, Scherick called Arledge into his office, and asked him to attend the annual AAU board of governors meeting. While he was shaking hands, Scherick said, "if the mood seemed right, might he cut a deal to broadcast AAU events on ABC?" It seemed like a tall assignment, however as Scherick said years later, "Roone was a gentile and I was not." Arledge came back with a deal for ABC to broadcast all AAU events for $50,000 per year. Next, Scherick and Arledge divided up their NCAA college football sponsor list. They then telephoned their sponsors and said in so many words, "Advertise on our new sports show coming up in April, or forget about buying commercials on NCAA college football this fall." The two persuaded enough sponsors to advertise on the broadcasts, though it took them to the last day of a deadline imposed by ABC's programming operations to do it.

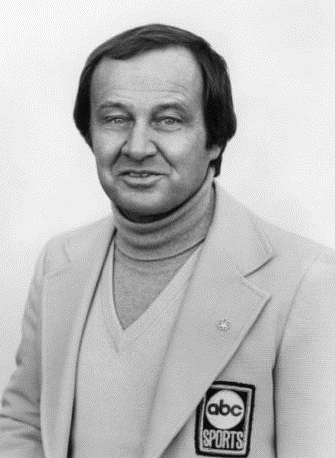
ABC sportscaster Jim McKay

Wide World of Sports – an anthology series featuring a different sporting event each broadcast, which premiered on the network on April 29, 1961 – suited Scherick's plans exactly. By exploiting the speed of jet transportation and flexibility of videotape, Scherick was able to undercut NBC and CBS's advantages in broadcasting live sporting events. In that era, with communications nowhere near as universal as they are in the present day, ABC was able to safely record events on videotape for later broadcast without worrying about an audience finding out the results. Arledge, his colleague Chuck Howard, and Jim McKay (who left CBS for this opportunity) made up the show on a week-by-week basis during the first year of Wide World's run. Arledge had a genius for the dramatic storyline that unfolded in the course of a game or event. McKay's honest curiosity and reporter's bluntness gave the show an emotional appeal which attracted viewers who might not have otherwise watched a sporting event. More importantly from Arledge's perspective, Wide World of Sports allowed him to demonstrate his ability as an administrator as well as a producer.

His ability to provide prime sports content was solidified in 1964, when ABC appointed Arledge as the vice president of ABC Sports. That same year, Scherick left the sports division to become ABC's vice president of programming – leaving Arledge as the top executive at ABC Sports, although he would not gain a formal title as president for four years.

In 1968, Arledge was formally appointed as president of ABC Sports. As the sports division's president for the succeeding 18 years, his job was his hobby; as he described it, it was good because he watched sports for work rather than leisure, but had a downside as he had no time left for leisure activities. He made sportsmen into stars, a trend he would later bring to the news division where he lured established anchors and correspondents such as David Brinkley and Diane Sawyer and paid unheard-of salaries, including the first million-dollar contract to Barbara Walters.

Arledge personally produced all ten of ABC's Olympic Games broadcasts, created the primetime Monday Night Football and coined the famous "thrill of victory, agony of defeat" tagline first used on Wide World of Sports – although ABC insiders of that era attribute the authorship to legendary sports broadcaster Jim McKay. Over the next few years, the look of the network's sports telecasts became more intimate and entertaining as, under Arledge, ABC introduced techniques such as slow motion replay, freeze frame, instant replay, split-screen, hand-held cameras, endzone cameras, underwater cameras and cameras on cranes.

=== 1970s: Monday Night Football, Ring Magazine Scandal ===
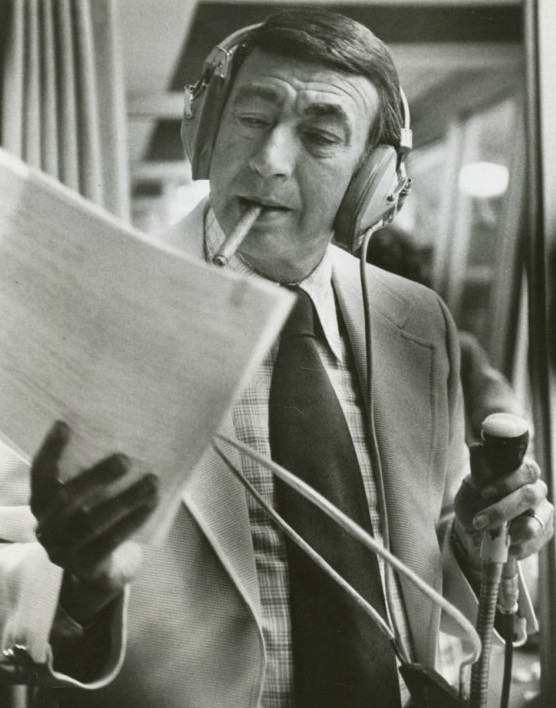
ABC sportscaster Howard Cosell in the Monday Night Football broadcast booth

As part of an agreement with the National Football League (which completed its merger with the American Football League that year), Monday Night Football debuted on ABC in September 1970, which served as the NFL's premier game of the week until 2006, when Sunday Night Football, which moved to NBC that year as part of a broadcast deal that in turn saw MNF move to ESPN, took over as the league's marquee game. Although it suffered a decline in ratings toward the end of its ABC run, the program was a hit for the network; according to ABC president Leonard Goldenson, Monday Night Football helped regularly score ABC an audience share of 15%–16%.

With the creation of Monday Night Football, Arledge not only anchored ABC's primetime programming, but created a national pastime. At first, nobody – including the affiliates and the advertisers – supported the idea of primetime football games at the beginning of the week. Arledge said, regarding this skepticism, "But I thought there was something special about football, because there are so few games, and relatively few teams. Also, there is something about the look of a night game, with the lights bouncing off the helmets."

It was not only the lights that made watching Arledge-style football on ABC an event in itself. The games were transformed into events through the technical innovations envisioned by Arledge and through a new style of sportscaster embodied in Howard Cosell. ABC was the first network not to allow announcer approval by the league from which it was purchasing broadcast rights. Arledge said, "CBS had been the basic football network. They treated it like a religion and would almost never criticize it. But if you screwed up on Monday Night Football, Cosell would let everyone know about it." Arledge proudly pointed out that the program "changed the habits of the nation."

In 1977, Arledge's executive responsibilities at ABC were expanded, and he was made president of ABC News while remaining as head of ABC Sports.

In 1976, unscrupulous managing editor of The Ring, Johnny Ort, fabricated records of selected boxers, to elevate them, thereby securing them lucrative fights on the American ABC television network, as part of the United States Championship Tournament, orchestrated by promoter Don King to capitalize on the patriotism surrounding the United States Bicentennial and the American amateur success at the 1976 Summer Olympic Games. King's idea was to defeat the non-American boxers who held the vast majority of world titles below the heavyweight division. Keeping in line with the patriotic theme of the promotion, King held shows at "patriotic" locales—such as the United States Naval Academy in Annapolis, Maryland, as well as on an aircraft carrier stationed off Pensacola, Florida. Despite the above, the 1977 Ring Record Book contained the fictitious additions to the records of the boxers in question and were never taken out of their records of the boxers. Those dubious bouts would continue to appear in subsequent Ring Record Book editions.

The Ring Record magazine scandal was uncovered by boxing writer Malcolm "Flash" Gordon and ABC staffer Alex Wallau. After Gordon and Wallau's evidence was presented to ABC executive Roone Arledge the United States Championship tournament was cancelled. Despite being hoodwinked and manipulated by Don King, in 1977 ABC made Arledge president of the then low-rated network news division, all while Arledge retained control of the Sports Division. The ABC Ring Scandal would lead to the eventual resignation of New York State Boxing Commissioner James Farley Jr., who had lent his name to the Championship fights and who was the son of former New York State Athletic Commissioner and former Postmaster General James Aloysius Farley, who had died one year prior to the scandal. Farley Jr., had accepted a hotel room which had been furnished by King. This was used by David W. Burke who at that time was a secretary of Governor Hugh Carey, to force Farley Jr.'s eventual resignation form the New York State Athletic commission. In August 1977 Mr. Arledge announced the appointment of David W. Burke, as his new assistant for administration, with the title of vice president. Mr. Burke helped develop programs including This Week with David Brinkley and Nightline, and had no prior television or journalism experience prior to his hiring by Arledge. No formal charges of impropriety were ever filed against Farley Jr.. The following year the Boxing Writers Association dedicated their highest honor, the "James A. Farley Award", after Farley Sr., for honesty and integrity in the sport of boxing.

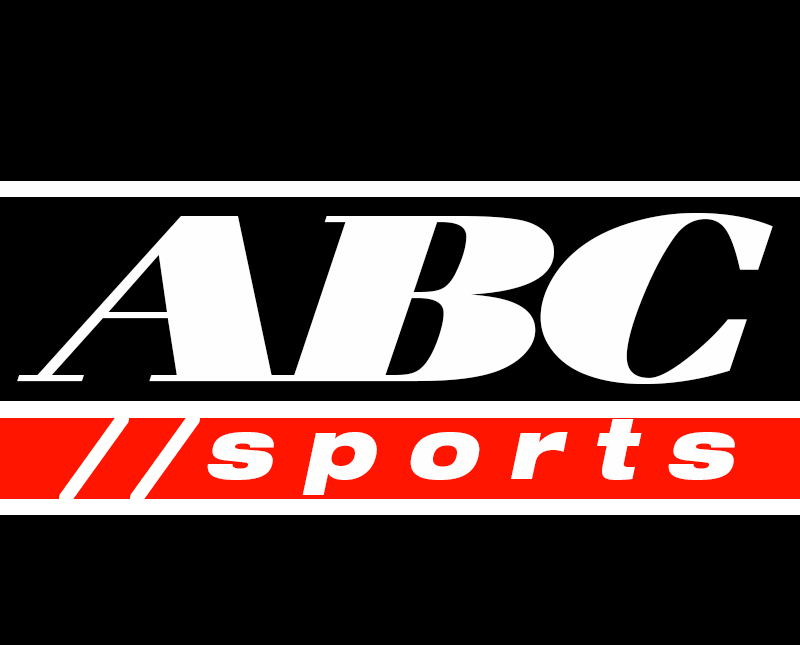
Logo for ABC Sports from 1988 to 1993

=== 1980s and 1990s: Disney purchase ===
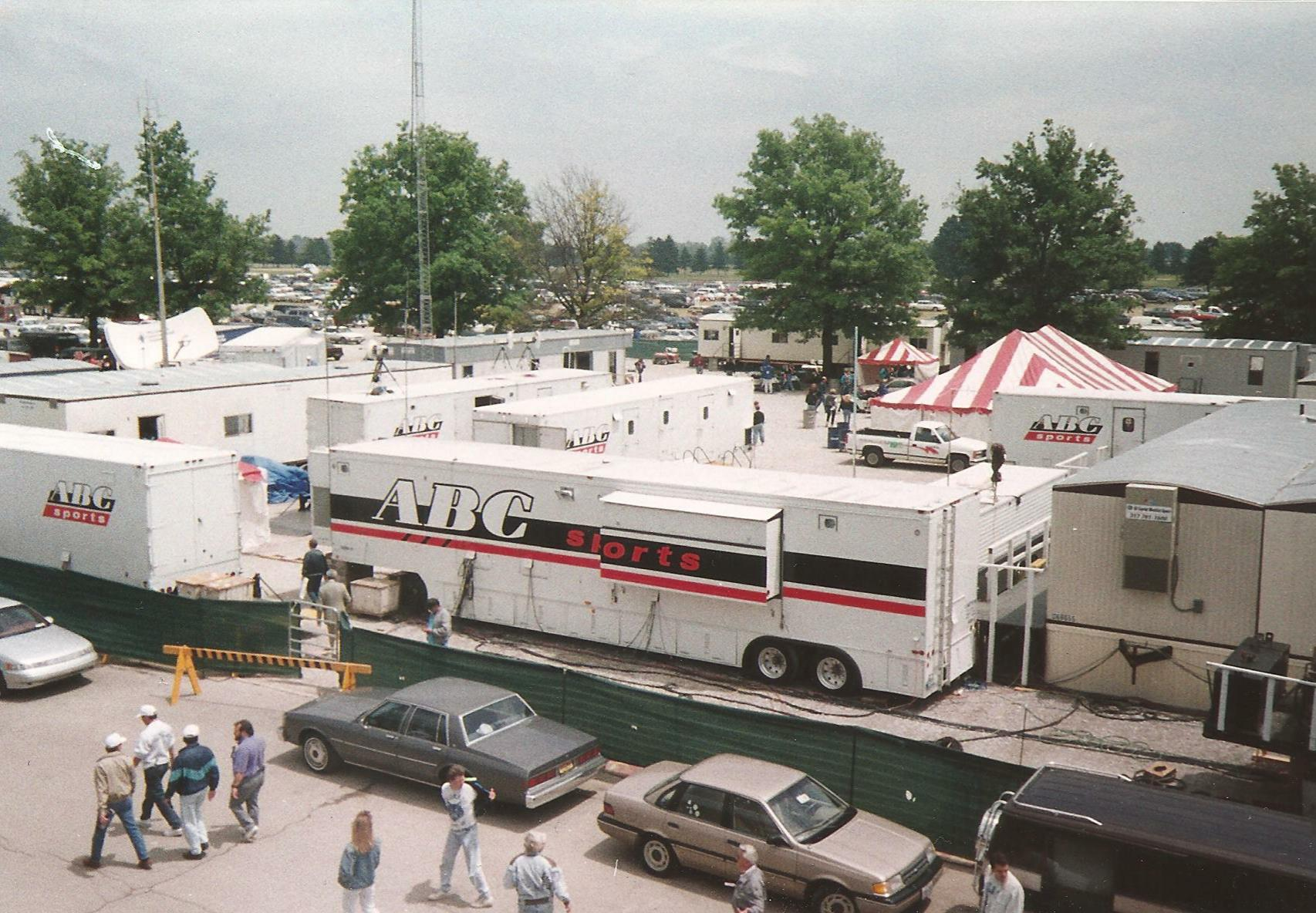
The ABC Sports broadcasting complex at the 1993 Indianapolis 500

The seeds of its eventual integration with ESPN occurred when ABC acquired a controlling interest in ESPN from Getty Oil in 1984. One year later, Capital Cities Communications purchased ABC for US$3.5 billion. Although some ESPN sportscasters such as John Saunders and Dick Vitale began to also appear on ABC Sports telecasts and shared some sports content (particularly the USFL), ESPN and ABC Sports continued to operate as separate entities.

After The Walt Disney Company bought Capital Cities/ABC in 1996, Disney started to slowly integrate ESPN and ABC Sports. ESPN personalities like Chris Berman, Mike Tirico and Brad Nessler also began working on ABC Sports broadcasts. In 1998, ESPN adopted the graphics and music package used by ABC Sports for Monday Night Football for the network's Sunday Night Football broadcasts. ESPN graphics were also utilized on ABC's motorsports telecasts, including IndyCar and NASCAR events, during this period.

That same year, ESPN signed a five-year contract to televise National Hockey League (NHL) games, whereby the cable network essentially purchased time on ABC to air selected NHL games on the broadcast network. This was noted in copyright tags at the conclusion of the telecasts (i.e., "The preceding program has been paid for by ESPN, Inc."). ESPN later signed a similar television rights contract with the National Basketball Association (NBA) in 2002, allowing it to produce and broadcast NBA games on ABC under a similar time buy arrangement on the broadcast network.

=== 2000s: ESPN on ABC ===
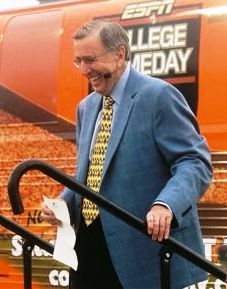
Brent Musburger became top ABC and ESPN broadcaster in the 2000s

Between 2000 and 2002, many ABC Sports programs utilized graphics almost identical to those used on ESPN. One notable exception was Monday Night Football, which switched to a different graphics package as part of then-new producer Don Ohlmeyer's attempt to provide some renewed vigor into those telecasts. Subsequently, ABC changed graphics packages each fall from 2002 to 2005, while ESPN's basically remained consistent.

Meanwhile, Disney continued to consolidate the corporate structure of ESPN and ABC Sports. Steve Bornstein was given the title as president of both ESPN and ABC Sports in 1996. The sales, marketing, and production departments of both divisions were eventually merged. As a result, ESPN uses some union production crews for its coverage (as the networks normally do), whereas non-union personnel are quite common in cable sports broadcasting.

In August 2006, in the wake of the moves of Monday Night Football to ESPN and Sunday Night Football to NBC, it was announced that ABC Sports would be totally integrated into ESPN, incorporating the graphics and music used by the cable channel and its related television properties, and production staff. The brand integration does not directly affect whether the ESPN cable channelad shared the rights to IndyCar Series with NBCSN. IndyCar fans who have criticized ESPN on ABC's race broadcasts have used "Always Bad Coverage" as a deris or ABC carries a particular event, as in most cases this is governed by contracts with the applicable league or organization. Perhaps confusingly, this means that some events are broadcast with ESPN branding during ABC coverage, even though another channel owns the cable rights. For example, TNT held the cable television rights to the British Open from 2003 to 2009 (with ABC carrying the tournament's weekend coverage); in addition, from 2009 to 2018, ABC hive backronym pertaining to the quality of the telecasts. On the other hand, ESPN airs Major League Baseball games; however, ABC does not as Fox holds the broadcast television rights to the league's game telecasts. ABC would later air MLB postseason games in 2020 as part of the 2020 Wild Card Series. ABC would also air Sunday Night Baseball on August 8, 2021, between the Chicago White Sox and Chicago Cubs. This would be the first exclusive regular season telecast of Major League Baseball on ABC since 1989.

The last live sporting event televised under the ABC Sports banner was the United States Championship Game in the Little League World Series on Saturday, August 26, 2006 (ABC was slated to carry the Little League World Series Championship Game on Sunday, August 27, however rain forced the postponement of the game to the following Monday, August 28, with that game subsequently airing on ESPN2). The changeover took effect the following weekend to coincide with the start of the college football season, with NBA, IndyCar Series and NASCAR coverage eventually following suit.

However, ABC used a separate graphics package (incorporating the network's own logo) during its coverage of the final round of the Scripps National Spelling Bee, which were similar to the older-styled ESPN graphics but with a yellow base. In 2008, though, it utilized the newer yellow and red ESPN graphics which had been used on other recent telecasts, but with the ABC logo. These graphics were used through 2010. In 2011, the Bee was moved off of network TV and the telecast began to be produced by Scripps Television, which uses its own graphics.

=== 2010s: Re-emphasis on ABC brand ===
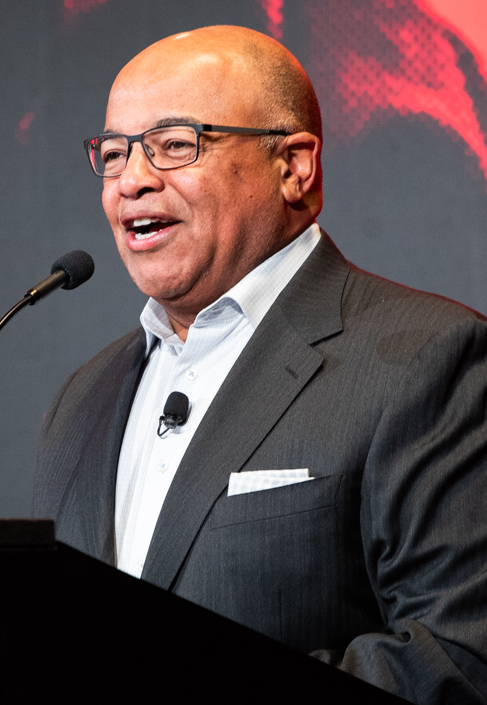
Mike Tirico worked for ABC Sports and ESPN from 1997 to 2015, covering several major sporting events

As ESPN has signed new contracts with various conferences to produce college football coverage, the network has begun branding its coverage of select conferences to which it has rights. This branding was first seen on SEC broadcasts in 2011, which became the "SEC on ESPN". ACC broadcasts followed suit in 2012 becoming the "ACC on ESPN". Despite the fact that ACC games also air on ABC, the games remain branded as the "ACC on ESPN" regardless of network. In 2016, a new contract brought conference branding to Big Ten telecasts as well, which air on both ESPN and ABC. While Big Ten games that air on ESPN cable channels are branded as the "Big Ten on ESPN", games airing on ABC are now branded as the "Big Ten on ABC". The next year, in 2017, the Pac-12 Conference began branding their games under the title, "Pac-12 on ESPN". While the program is still officially part of ESPN College Football which is reflected when talent appears on screen, the Big Ten on ABC logo and branding is used for intro, program IDs, and replay wipes. This is the first time any regularly scheduled sporting event outside of the National Spelling Bee has carried any ABC branding since 2006.

Also starting with Saturday Primetime in 2017, live NBA game action no longer shows the ESPN identification on screen. Previously under ESPN on ABC (since 2006–07), the ESPN logo was part of the score banner, while the ABC logo was separately floating on the right side of the screen, remaining on screen during replays. The version of the new 2016–17 graphics package used on ABC replaces the ESPN logo in the score banner with several stars, while the ABC logo (still constantly on screen) anchors the right side of the banner; however for the 2017–18 season, the ESPN logo was reintroduced onto a revised version of the score banner with the ABC logo still located to the right, beginning with the 2022 College Football Season, the ESPN on ABC logo is shown instead of just the ABC logo. In addition, commercial transitions for ABC games now contain the ABC logo. It is the first time NBA games on ABC don't have ESPN identification during live action since the 2006 NBA Finals.

An exception was during the MLS Cup 2019 on ABC, where no ESPN logo other than the mic flags appeared on the screen and the broadcast was introduced as "the 2019 MLS Cup Final on ABC" with the ABC logo appearing on the screen.

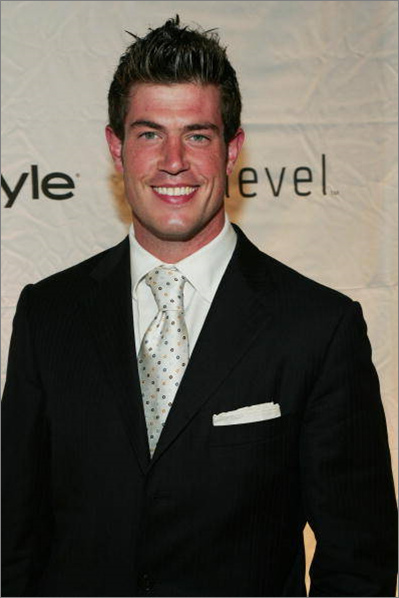
ABC and ESPN college football analyst Jesse Palmer also serves as the host of ABC's The Bachelor

For all soccer coverage, the ABC branding is used with little to no use of the ESPN logo (for example the Bundesliga on ABC).

Beginning in 2017, older ABC Sports branding elements have been re-used nostalgically by the network's sports-themed reality competition shows (which also import on-air talent from ESPN).

The revival of Battle of the Network Stars paid homage to the 1970s original (then hosted by Monday Night Football's Howard Cosell). "If you're expecting to see the yellow jackets and the [old school ABC Sports] mic flags, you'll be delighted," Executive Andrew Grossman told reporters." Episodes also began with a remake of the network's iconic Wide World of Sports introduction.

The 2019 "extreme miniature golf" competition Holey Moley also used 1970s replica ABC Sports jackets on its lead hosts, ESPN's Joe Tessitore and former Fox NFL Sunday prognosticator Rob Riggle, and guest commentators. Tessitore commented that its use was an homage to Cosell and the network's history of varied sports offerings. "That gold jacket was doing many extreme events; barrel jumping, Acapulco cliff diving. You can look at the history of legitimate sports coverage on ABC, ...that gold jacket was attached to a lot of sports that had one-year, two-year runs on Saturday afternoon on ABC ...I think it's something that Roone Arledge, who was always very forward-thinking, would recognize. ...in the Elvis Presley-Evel Knievel era of TV programming, there would have been a place for Holey Moley."

To celebrate the 50th anniversary of Monday Night Football, Steve Levy, Brian Griese, Louis Riddick, Lisa Salters, and John Parry all wore special ABC Sports replica jackets during the September 21 game between the New Orleans Saints and the Las Vegas Raiders. The game aired on ESPN, with ABC simulcasting the game, the network's first NFL regular season game in almost 15 years. This game was also the first NFL game to be played in the city of Las Vegas, and the first NFL game to be played in the state of Nevada. The gold jackets returned on October 31, 2022 MNF broadcast between the Cincinnati Bengals and the Cleveland Browns, this time worn by the new top team of Joe Buck, Troy Aikman and Lisa Salters.

To celebrate the first exclusive regular season telecast of a Major League Baseball game on ABC since 1989, Matt Vasgersian, Alex Rodriguez, and Buster Olney wore special ABC Sports patches during Sunday Night Baseball on August 8, 2021, between the Chicago White Sox and Chicago Cubs. Special graphics inspired by The Baseball Network were also used in conjunction with the standard ESPN MLB graphics. The game also featured a special guest appearance by former ABC announcer Al Michaels.

=== 2020s: Revitalization of sports on ABC ===
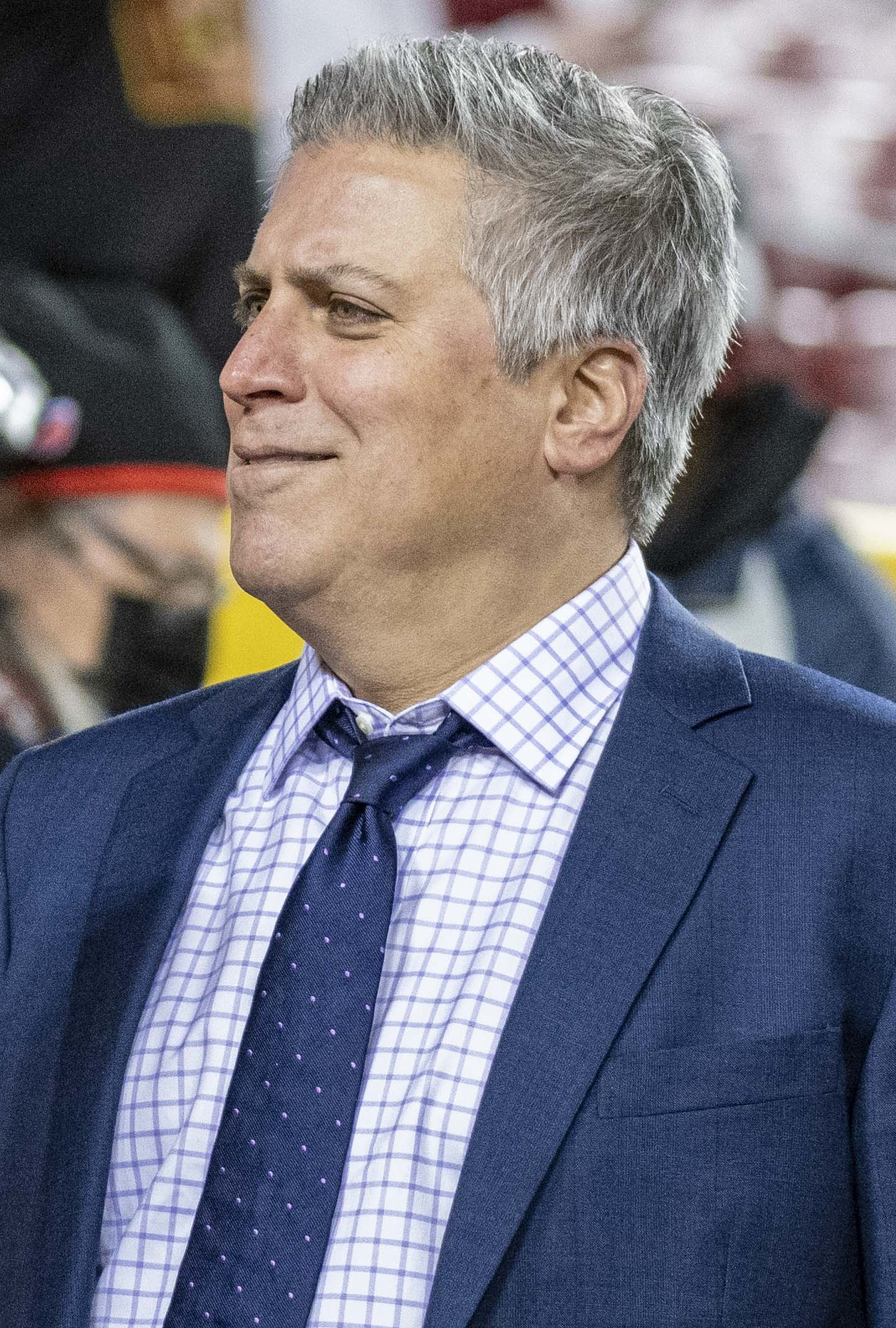
ABC and ESPN broadcaster Steve Levy

In the 2010s, the only consistent sports on ABC were college football, the NBA, the Indianapolis 500 and the Little League World Series.

ESPN began simulcasting an NFL Wild Card Playoff game on ABC starting in 2016, marking the first time ABC had an NFL game since Super Bowl XL; this was later followed by the Pro Bowl starting in 2018. Additionally, ABC simulcast ESPN's coverage of rounds 4–7 of the 2018 NFL draft. Then, starting in 2019, ABC aired all three days of the draft. In 2020, ABC simulcast 3 Monday Night Football games. The first regular season games aired nationally on the network since 2005. In 2022, ABC aired an exclusive game. In 2023, ABC aired 4 exclusive games. Also, due to the 2023 Hollywood labor disputes, ESPN announced that all remaining Monday Night Football games would be simulcast on ABC and was the first time since 2005 that it aired a full season of MNF.

In 2019, ABC aired the MLS Cup, its first Major League Soccer match since 2008. During the 2020 Major League Soccer season, ABC returned to airing regular season matches as well. ESPN did not renew its MLS deal after the 2022 season. ABC also aired matches from the German Bundesliga, Spanish La Liga, and the United States women's national soccer team. In 2021, ABC aired a Serie A match before losing those rights to CBS Sports the following season. In 2023, ABC lost the United States women's national soccer team broadcasts as they were picked up by TNT Sports. Later, ABC added the Supercopa de España final and the NWSL (beginning in 2024) as part of its soccer contract.

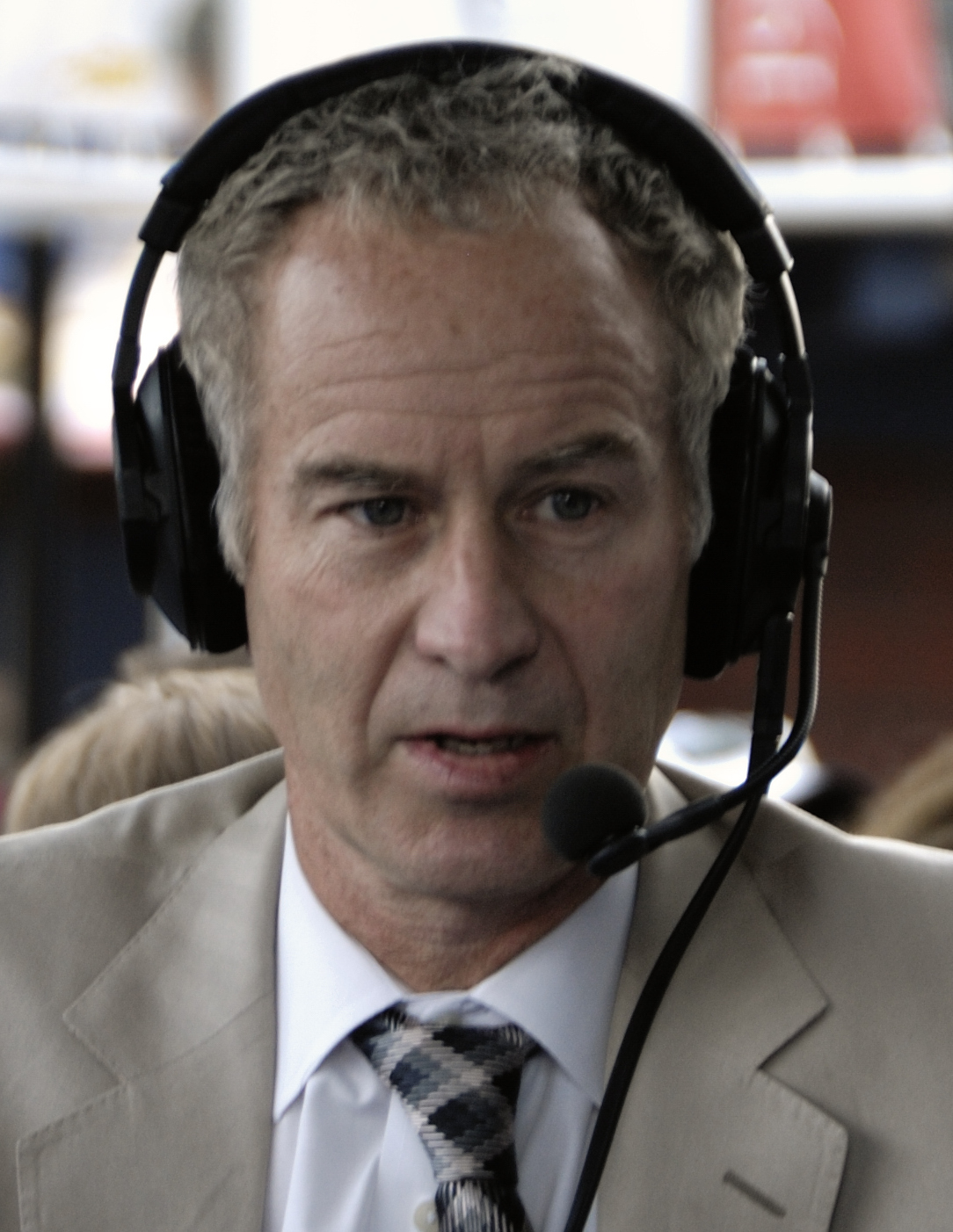
Hall of Fame tennis player John McEnroe appears as an analyst on ABC's tennis coverage

After a five-year hiatus, ABC returned to airing college basketball in 2019 with five games on the network, and has continued to do so since. Beginning with the 2021 NCAA Division I women's basketball tournament, select women's college basketball games have also aired on ABC. In December 2021, the first regular season women's college basketball game aired on ABC. In 2023, ABC aired the final of the Division I women's basketball tournament for the first time.

On May 6, 2019, the XFL announced that ESPN and Fox Sports had acquired the rights to broadcast the league's return, with the broadcasts airing on ABC, ESPN, Fox, and FS1, then later in 2023 on FX, with Fox Sports not opting to broadcast the XFL, leaving ESPN as the sole broadcast rights holder. The XFL later merged with Fox's United States Football League to form the United Football League; ABC holds an ownership stake in the merged league.

In 2020, MLB coverage returned to ABC, with the network carrying selected games from that season's newly introduced Wild Card Series round. In 2021, ESPN renewed its MLB contract through 2028, allowing it to continue carrying Wild Card Series games on ABC, as well as selected regular season games. On August 8, 2021, ABC carried a Sunday Night Baseball game between the Chicago White Sox and Chicago Cubs, in its first regular season MLB broadcast since 1995.

In 2021, ABC began airing coverage of the NBA draft. In 2023, due to the 2023 Hollywood labor disputes, ESPN announced that ABC would air a series of Wednesday night NBA games during January 2024 for the 2023–24 NBA season.

On March 10, 2021, ESPN announced a new, seven-year broadcast deal with the NHL, which included games on ESPN, ABC, and ESPN+ beginning in the 2021–22 season. ABC's first game back featured the New York Rangers and the Boston Bruins in the annual Thanksgiving Showdown on November 26, 2021. After ABC aired the 2022 NHL All-Star Game, the network aired a weekly game under the ABC Hockey Saturday branding, which began on February 26. The package primarily aired on Saturday afternoons, with one primetime game on March 19 to accommodate afternoon coverage of the 2022 NCAA Division I women's basketball tournament. All games broadcast by ABC are simulcast on ESPN+. The 2022 Stanley Cup Final marked the first to be broadcast in their entirety on over-the-air television since 1980, as the Finals had since either been partially or exclusively carried on cable.

In 2021, ABC broadcast its first UFC card, Holloway vs. Kattar on January 16, 2021, from Abu Dhabi. In 2022, ABC aired UFC in primetime for the first time when it aired the prelims of UFC 276 on July 2, 2022.

In 2022, as part of a contract renewal with Wimbledon, ABC began airing live weekend matches. In 2023, ABC aired weekend matches from the US Open for the first time.

In the 2024 season, ABC took over the Southeastern Conference (SEC)'s top college football package, billed as the SEC on ABC, including regular season games and the SEC Championship Game. Unlike previous rightsholder CBS (which traditionally aired SEC games at 3:30 p.m. ET), ABC airs SEC games in any of its Saturday windows (including Saturday Night Football), with the network regularly airing SEC double- and tripleheaders. Also beginning in 2024, ABC began to hold partial rights to the College Football Playoff, simulcasting two first-round games with ESPN. Beginning in 2027, ABC will simulcast the College Football Playoff National Championship with ESPN.

== ESPN, ABC Sports, Hearst and the NFL ==
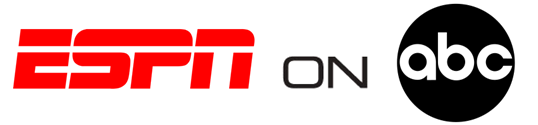
ESPN on ABC logo, used from its introduction in 2006 until 2012

ESPN on ABC logo, used from in 2013

ESPN on ABC logo used until 2021.

ESPN on ABC logo, introduced in 2022

Despite the rebranding, ABC Sports continues to exist, at least nominally, as a division of the ABC network. One indication of this was the retention of George Bodenheimer's official title as "President, ESPN Inc. and ABC Sports" even after the rebranding – the second part of the title would presumably be unnecessary if ESPN had fully absorbed ABC's sports operations – though following Bodenheimer's retirement and the subsequent appointment of John Skipper at the end of 2011, the title was shortened to "President, ESPN Inc." In addition, ABC itself maintains the copyright over many of the ESPN-branded broadcasts, if they are not contractually assigned to the applicable league or organizer, suggesting that ESPN has merely "loaned" usage of its brand name, staff and infrastructure to ABC, rather than having acquired ABC Sports outright. ABC News Radio also continues to brand its short-form sports updates as ABC Sports Radio; this service is separate from the ESPN Radio network.

This is likely a minor technicality stemming from ESPN being technically a joint venture between Disney (which owns a 72% controlling interest via ABC Inc.), Hearst Communications (which owns 18%), and the National Football League (which owns 10%). Disney has long exercised operational control of the network, while Hearst is believed to be more of a silent partner rather than an active participant in ESPN's management. However, this relationship does mean that Hearst's ABC-affiliated stations – such as WCVB-TV in Boston; WMUR-TV in Manchester, New Hampshire; WTAE-TV in Pittsburgh; WISN-TV in Milwaukee; WPBF-TV in West Palm Beach; and KMBC-TV in Kansas City – have right of first refusal to local simulcasts of ESPN-televised Monday Night Football games involving home-market teams, which are very rarely waived to other stations within their markets. Equally, other Hearst-owned stations such as NBC affiliates WLWT-TV in Cincinnati, WBAL-TV in Baltimore, and WDSU-TV in New Orleans have been able to air NFL games from ESPN for the same reason (independent station WMOR-TV in the Tampa market is also eligible to air these games, but rarely if ever does so).

Under NFL broadcasting rules, the league's cable or streaming games must be simulcast on broadcast television in the local markets of the teams playing in the broadcast, though the game is not permitted to air in the home team's market if tickets do not sell out 72 hours before kickoff – games that are not sold out must be blacked out in the market of origin (due to the league's March 2015 decision to suspend its blackout policies, all NFL games televised by ESPN during the 2015 season were allowed to air on broadcast television in the originating market of the game and the home markets of both participating teams). Similar rules and rights were previously in place for ESPN-televised Major League Baseball playoff games, except in that non-sellout games were not blacked out (Major League Baseball does not black out games based on attendance, but rather to protect local broadcasters). ABC owned-and-operated stations also have right of first refusal for NFL (and previously Major League Baseball postseason) simulcasts from ESPN, though in recent years the stations have passed on airing the game telecasts in favor of carrying ABC's Monday night schedule, which includes the popular reality competition series Dancing with the Stars. With the series moving to Disney+ beginning with Season 31, ABC affiliates will more than likely air future MNF simulcasts. Dancing with the Stars returned to ABC, while staying on Disney+ for Season 32, but because of the actors and writers strikes that began during the summer, Disney moved DWTS to Tuesdays, allowing ABC to pick up simulcasts of all MNF games in 2023, excluding Weeks 2, 3, and 14, when ESPN will air different games as part of their “Two Games, One Night” doubleheader series. Thus, other local affiliates will pick up simulcasts of the ESPN game since ABC will have their own game.

== Siphoning ==
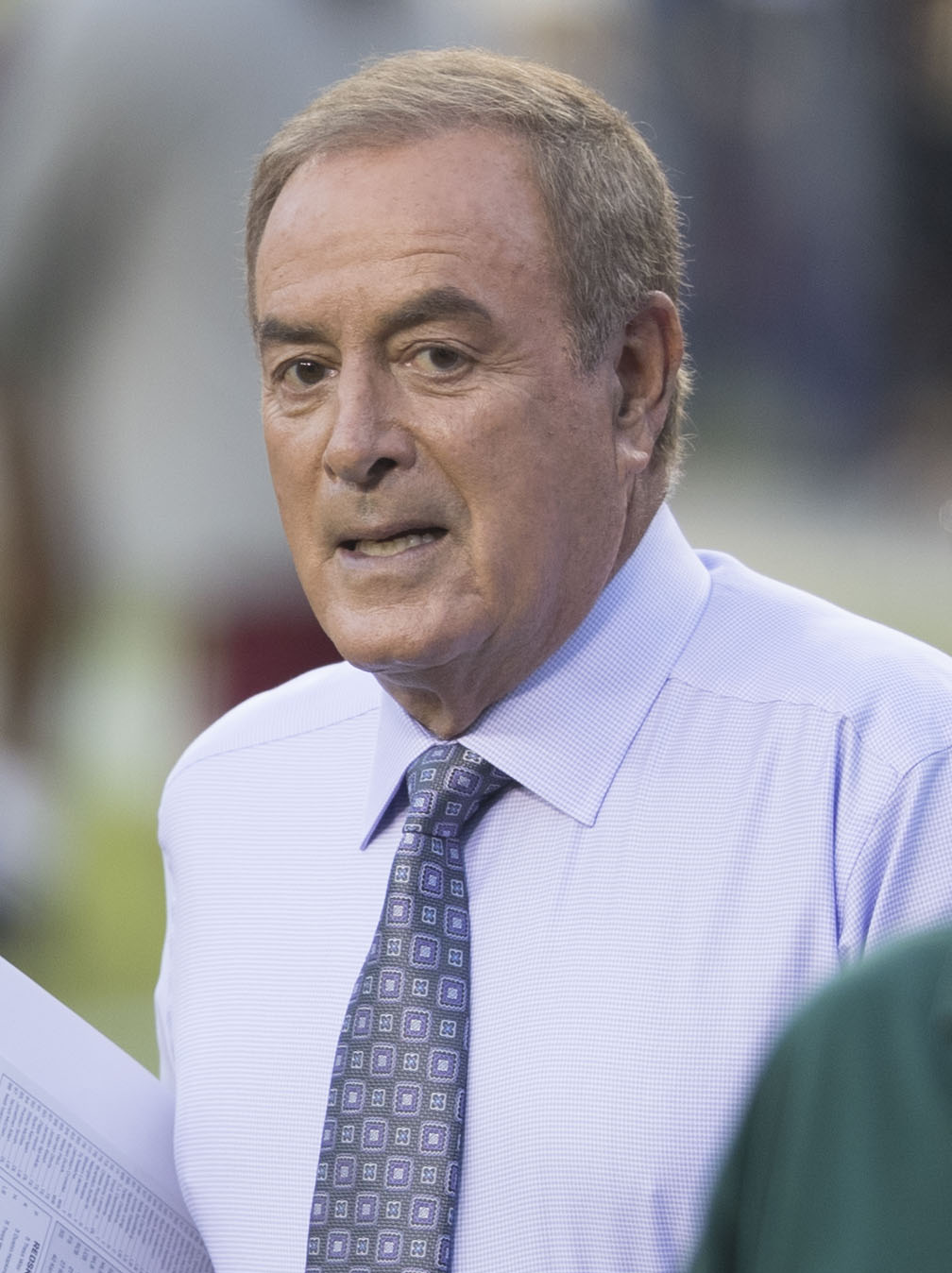
Al Michaels, sportscaster for ABC Sports from 1977 to 2006

ESPN and The Walt Disney Company have been criticized for decreasing the amount of sports programming televised on ABC. Several ABC affiliates have also voiced opposition regarding the increasing migration of live sporting event telecasts from ABC to ESPN.

An example was in regards to NASCAR race broadcasts: from 2007 to 2009, ABC aired all of the Chase for the NASCAR Sprint Cup races, with the exception of the 2008 Checker O'Reilly Auto Parts 500 when the race was moved to ESPN2 except for the West coast, along with one other race. From 2010 to 2014, only three Sprint Cup races and one Chase race (Charlotte) were shown on ABC, to the outrage of many NASCAR fans and sponsors. Several other events such as college football's Rose Bowl and Capital One Bowl games, and the British Open golf tournament have also been transferred from ABC to ESPN (although the Capital One Bowl would return to ABC in 2013). This, however, is not entirely the fault of ESPN, as ABC in general has attracted a primarily female viewership in recent years, with sports largely attracting a male-dominated –though not exclusive – audience.

The decrease in sports events televised by ABC has resulted in the network having a very inconsistent weekend afternoon sports schedule similar – if not somewhat equal – to Fox in previous years (and to some extent, to this day, even with the expansion of sports coverage on Fox since 2011); ESPN-produced sports specials (aired as part of the 30 for 30 and E:60 anthology series) and/or more recently, figure skating and gymnastics specials supplied by Disson Skating (a subsidiary of independent production company Disson Sports & Entertainment) as well as syndicated programs or infomercials scheduled by the network's owned-and-operated stations and affiliates fill the weekend afternoon schedule on days when the network is not scheduled to air a sporting event; until 2014, ABC-supplied rerun blocks of certain prime-time network shows and occasional theatrical film telecasts have also filled the schedule on weekend afternoons without a scheduled sports event. As a consequence of this, ABC turned over an hour of its then-existing two-hour Sunday afternoon block (from 4 to 5 p.m. Eastern Time) to its affiliates on June 21, 2015, reducing its Sunday schedule on weeks without major sporting events to one hour; the 5 p.m. (Eastern) hour that was retained is usually reserved for rebroadcasts of ESPN sports documentaries. However, as of January 2016, ABC rescinded the remaining hour of its Sunday afternoon schedule (5–6pm Eastern Time) back to its affiliates thus leaving ABC without a Sunday afternoon block (save for major sporting events). This exclusively relegated ABC's sports schedule to Saturday afternoons (and by extension, ABC's non-news weekend schedule to 3 to 6 pm and 8 to 11 pm on Saturdays and 7:00 to 11:00 pm on Sundays). ABC's in-house network-programmed Sunday schedule not counting news-related programming as a result of this is now exclusively relegated to its four-hour prime time block (from 7 to 11 pm).

In the early and mid 2010s, ABC lost several lucrative sports contracts. It lost the rights for the American Le Mans Series in 2013 when it merged with the Rolex Grand Am Series to form the WeatherTech SportsCar Championship and subsequently moved to Fox in 2014, later moving to NBC Sports in 2019. It also ended its FIFA coverage after the 2014 FIFA World Cup with Fox acquiring the rights starting in 2015. It then lost its NASCAR broadcast rights the same year with rights being picked up by NBC in 2015. Also, it phased out the last of its college basketball coverage also in the same year (the SEC men's basketball tournament) with the tournament being moved to the ESPN cable networks, although college basketball would later return to the network in 2019. It also gave up its highlights show relating to the British Open golf tournament in 2015, as ESPN later sold the rights to NBC in 2016. In 2016, ABC ended its regularly scheduled doubleheaders for its NBA Sunday Showcase, opting to opening up a window for Saturday night games and leaving single games on Sunday afternoons in most cases. In addition, ABC discontinued airing Grantland-related programming when the brand shut down operations in October. The network also lost rights to broadcast the IndyCar Series, including the Indianapolis 500, in 2018 with the rights moving to NBC Sports, which had already been the series' cable partner (moving the race away from ABC after 54 years); coincidentally in that same year, ABC aired several Formula One races a year after ESPN acquired the F1 rights from NBC Sports; the network would lose the rights in 2025, as they moved to Apple TV.

== Picture format differences from ESPN cable outlets ==
Unlike other ESPN networks, ESPN on ABC events were still produced with graphics and a BottomLine framed for the 4:3 aspect ratio – as opposed to the 16:9 formatting used for the ticker and graphics on the ESPN family of networks, as well as CBS, Fox, and NBC's sports telecasts. However, beginning during the 2016 Little League World Series in August 2016, ABC migrated to a 16:9 presentation for ESPN on ABC broadcasts, similar to the ESPN cable networks, as ABC's entertainment programming also switched to a 16:9 presentation in September.

== Taglines ==
Alternate ABC Sports logo, used from 2001 to 2006

Each ABC Sports broadcast would usually begin with the tagline: "The following is a presentation of ABC Sports." Sometimes, events that pre-empt regular programming (locally or nationally) would begin with: "The following is a special presentation of ABC Sports." Until September 1998, ABC Sports programs ended with the line "This has been a presentation of ABC Sports, recognized around the world as the leader in sports television."

After Disney began to integrate ESPN and ABC Sports after buying both companies in 1996, ABC changed the tagline to "Continuing the tradition of excellence." This tagline lasted from September 1998 through late 2002. Beginning in 2001, ABC added the tagline to "ABC Sports: Championship Television," in regards to ABC's sports championship lineup (which included the Bowl Championship Series, the Stanley Cup Final, the Super Bowl, the NBA Finals, the Indianapolis 500, and the FIFA World Cup), which lasted through September 2, 2006, when Disney totally integrated ESPN into ABC Sports.

Since 2000, the closing tagline – "This has been a presentation of ABC Sports, in association with ESPN" – had been used at the end of each NHL and NBA broadcast on ABC, because of their deals through ESPN. This lasted through September 2, 2006, when the tagline “This has been a presentation of ESPN, The Worldwide Leader in Sports” became permanent for all ABC broadcasts, when ABC Sports was renamed ESPN on ABC.

When the ESPN on ABC transition was complete, each broadcast at first used the tagline "The following is a presentation of ESPN on ABC", while ending with the tagline, "This has been a presentation of ESPN on ABC", in a similar manner to ABC Sports back then. ("The following is a special presentation of ESPN on ABC" is used whenever the regular program line-up (network or local) is pre-empted as a result of that event.) The ending had been used on a regular basis from 2006 through 2012, but as of today, has been rarely used. In late 2013, ESPN introduced a new intro for ESPN on ABC, again with two different voiceovers being recorded. One with the announcer saying “A special presentation” (for special sporting events and telecasts that cause the regular program line-up to be pre-empted), another with the same announcer saying “A presentation” that is used for scheduled sporting events. If there was a string of various programming on a certain weekend or a simulcast of an event airing on ESPN (most notably the final day of the NFL draft), the tagline "You're watching ESPN on ABC" has been used.

For ABC's primetime college football games in 2018, every broadcast had the tagline, "This is ESPN on ABC, brought to you in part by Samsung QLED TV, the official TV of ESPN College Football". This tagline became permanent for every college football game aired on ABC in 2019, except for a few games. Beginning with the 2021 college football season, ESPN reverted to the above tagline full-time.

On days where ABC airs events on holidays, e.g. Christmas and New Year's Day, each broadcast had the tagline "The following is a special holiday presentation of ESPN on ABC." This is primarily used before the pregame show during ABC's NBA Christmas Day tripleheader (2 ABC exclusive games, the last one is also simulcast on ESPN, but all 5 games are now televised on ABC and simulcast on ESPN since 2022), and for ABC's coverage of the Citrus Bowl on New Year's Day.

Prior to the 2022 LLWS Championship Game and the 2022 college football season, a new opening sequence was introduced, which begins as a black screen, then zooms out from the ESPN logo, and a red line flashes through the logo, and unveiling the ESPN on ABC logo in white, with red lining. A new tagline, "This is ESPN on ABC", as well as a new score is also introduced, with the latter keeping the ending part of the Bob Christianson's score from 2006-early 2022. Two versions of this tagline were recorded, one with a male voice that's mostly shown for broadcasts in primetime, another with a female voice, usually shown in the afternoon and predominantly for women's sports events like the WNBA and the NCAA Women's Basketball Tournament. Furthermore, prior to the 2025 NBA playoffs, a special NBA on ESPN variant was debuted, which shows gold lines unraveled to reveal the NBA on ESPN logo in gold, with the ABC logo, also in gold, shown on the left and the Larry O'Brien Championship Trophy being constructed on the right with circles surrounding it. Furthermore, the 2022 NBA on ESPN theme, composed by Made Music Studios' Eric Hall, plays, alongside the male voice.

In addition, the ESPN on ABC logo is now shown as a persistent screen bug mostly on the top right corner. For some events, the logo is on the lower right corner when ESPN BottomLine is not used, and on the top left corner if other logos/information is shown on the top right corner, throughout ESPN events airing on ABC. In the case of championship games, the ESPN on ABC screen bug is shown in gold.

== Programs throughout the years ==
=== Current ===
- NFL on ABC (1948–1950, 1952–1955, 1959, 1970–2005, 2015–present)
  - Monday Night Football (self-produced; 1970–2005, select simulcast of ESPN's coverage; 2020–present, select ABC exclusive games; 2022–2025)
  - NFL Wild Card Playoff game (self-produced, two games; 1990–2005, simulcast of ESPN's coverage, one game; 2016–present)
  - NFL Divisional Playoff game (simulcast of ESPN's coverage; 2024–present)
  - NFL Draft (simulcast of ESPN's day 3 coverage, 2018–present; self-produced day 1 and 2 coverage, 2019–present)
  - Back Together Weekend (2021–present)
  - NFL Flag Championships (2024–present)
  - Super Bowl: (self-produced: XIX, XXII, XXV, XXIX, XXXIV, XXXVII, and XL; simulcast of ESPN's coverage: LXI, and LXV)
- NBA on ABC (1964–1973, 2002–present)
  - NBA Saturday Primetime (2015–present)
  - NBA Sunday Showcase (2003–present)
  - NBA Christmas Special (1967–1972, 2002–present)
  - NBA playoffs (1964–1973, 2003–present)
  - NBA Finals (1965–1973, 2003–present)
  - NBA draft (2021–present)
  - NBA Cup knockout round games (2023, 2024)
  - Inside the NBA (2025–present; sublicensing agreement with TNT Sports)
- NHL on ABC (1993–1994, 2000–2004, 2021–present)
  - NHL Stadium Series (2023–2024; 2027-present)
  - ABC Hockey Saturday (2022–present)
  - NHL All-Star Game (2000–2004; 2022–2024; 2027–present)
  - NHL 4 Nations Face-Off (2025)
  - Stanley Cup Playoffs (1993–1994; 2000–2004; 2023–present)
  - Stanley Cup Final (2000–2004; and semiannually since 2022)
- Soccer on ABC
  - La Liga (2021–present)
  - Supercopa de España (2023–present)
  - National Women's Soccer League (2024–present)
  - ESPN FC (occasional broadcasts)
- College Football on ABC (1950, 1952, 1954–1956, 1960–present)
  - American, ACC, Big 12 and SEC
  - Saturday Night Football (2006–present)
  - Citrus Bowl (1987–2010, 2013–present)
  - Celebration Bowl (2015–2019, 2021–present)
  - First Responder Bowl (2020, 2027–present)
  - Liberty Bowl (1966–1971, 1976–1980, 1995, 2011, 2017, 2027–present)
  - Pinstripe Bowl (2015, 2024–present)
  - Pop-Tarts Bowl (2019, 2024–2025)
  - Gator Bowl (2025)
  - Cactus Bowl (2026–present)
  - Big 12 Championship Game (1996–2010, 2018–present)
  - ACC Championship Game (2005–2007, 2013–present)
  - American Conference Football Championship Game (2015–present)
  - SEC Championship Game (1993–2000, 2024–present)
  - College Football Playoff (2024–present)
  - MEAC/SWAC Challenge (2023–present)
  - NCAA Division I Football Championship Playoffs (2021, 2023–present)
- Major League Baseball on ABC (1953–1954, 1960–1965, 1976–1988, 1994–1995, 2020–present)
- Little League World Series (1963–2019, 2021–present)
  - USA & International Championships
  - Saturday & Sunday mid bracket coverage
  - Little League Softball Championship Game (2023–present)
- X Games (1997–present)
  - World of X Games (2014–present)
- WNBA on ABC (2003–present)
  - WNBA All-Star Game
  - Select weekend afternoon WNBA regular season games
  - WNBA Playoffs (exclusive from 2003 to 2025, shares with NBC and Prime Video beginning in 2026)
  - Select Sunday games of the WNBA Finals (annually until 2025, alternates with NBC and Prime Video beginning in 2026)
- Tennis on ESPN
  - Wimbledon (2012–present)
    - condensed re-broadcasts of ESPN's coverage of Gentlemen's and Ladies' Singles finals (2012–present)
    - Live Wimbledon Middle Weekend matches (2022–present)
  - US Open
    - Arthur Ashe Kids Day
    - live coverage on Labor Day weekend (2023–present)
    - Men's Final (2024–present)
  - Australian Open
    - highlights show (2022–present)
- College Basketball on ABC (Men's) (1962, 1973, 1978, 1987–2014, 2019–present)
- College Basketball on ABC (Women's) (2021–present)
  - NCAA Division I women's basketball tournament (2021–present)
  - National Championship Game (2023–present)
- NCAA women's gymnastics tournament (2021–present)
  - Regular Season 2022–present
- College softball
  - Women's College World Series (2021–present)
- College Baseball
  - College World Series (Finals game, 2024–present)
  - Southeastern Conference baseball tournament (Finals game, 2026–present)
- UFL (2024–present)
- Premier Lacrosse League (2022–present)
- Professional Pickleball Association PPA Tour Team Championships (2022–present)
- NCAA Division I women's volleyball tournament (National Championship Game, 2023–present)
  - Regular Season 2024–present
  - Playoffs 2024–present

=== Additional programming ===
- New York City Marathon (2013–present): condensed rebroadcast of ESPN2's coverage; coverage simulcast live on WABC-TV in New York
- Tournament of Roses Parade (1989–present): produced by ABC Sports from 1989 to 2006 and by ESPN since 2007
- ESPY Awards (2015–present) (rebroadcast in 2020, live coverage was on ESPN)
- AKC National Championship (2021–present)
- SportsCenter (2020–present; occasional broadcasts)

=== Former programs ===
- Professional football
  - NFL Thursday Night Kickoff game (2003–2005)
  - NFL Honors (2022)
  - Pro Bowl (self-produced; 1975–1987, 1995–2003; simulcast of ESPN's coverage; 2018–2025)
  - NFL Scouting Combine (2019–2020)
  - Pro Football Hall of Fame Game (self-produced 1970–2005; simulcast of ESPN's coverage; 2024)
  - American Football League (1960–1964)
  - United States Football League (1983–1985)
  - World League of American Football (1991–1992)
  - Arena Football League on ESPN (1998–2002, 2007–2008)
  - Continental Football League (1966–1969)
  - XFL (2020; 2023)
- Major League Baseball on ABC
  - Major League Baseball Game of the Week (1953–1954, 1960–1965)
  - Monday Night Baseball (1976–1988, telecasts moved to Thursday for 1989)
  - Baseball Night in America (1994–1995) (co-production with NBC Sports and Major League Baseball)
  - World Series: 1948–1950, 1977, 1979, 1981, 1983, 1985, 1987, 1989, and 1995 (Games 1, 4, & 5)
  - League Championship Series (all series even-numbered years 1976–1988; both series 1995 Games 1–2)
  - Division Series (ALDS 1981; select games 1995)
  - Major League Baseball All-Star Game (even-numbered years 1976–1988; 1995)
  - One Sunday Night Baseball game (2021)
  - Major League Baseball Wild Card Series (2020, 2022–2025)
- UFC on ABC (ESPN+ simulcasts, 2021–2025)
- College Football on ABC
  - Sugar Bowl (1953–1957, 1970–2006)
  - Rose Bowl Game (1989–2010)
  - Fiesta Bowl (1999–2006)
  - Orange Bowl (1962–1964, 1999–2006)
  - Gator Bowl (1965–1968, 1972–1985)
  - Aloha Bowl (1986–2000)
  - Army–Navy Game (1954, 1960–1961, 1966–1981, 1983, 1991–1995)
  - Peach Bowl (1989–1990)
  - Duke's Mayo Bowl (2018, 2026)
  - Outback Bowl (2011–2012, 2017, 2021)
  - Boca Raton Bowl (2019)
  - Gasparilla Bowl (2020)
  - Independence Bowl (1990, 1991, 2014, 2021)
  - New Mexico Bowl (2022)
  - Las Vegas Bowl (2001, 2013–2019, 2023)
  - LA Bowl (2021–2023, 2025)
  - Music City Bowl (2022–2023)
  - Cure Bowl (2023)
  - Birmingham Bowl (2023)
  - Armed Forces Bowl (2023)
  - Alamo Bowl (2024)
  - Pac-12 Conference (2011–2023)
  - Pac-12 Football Championship Game (2019, 2021, 2023)
  - Big Ten Conference (2007–2022)
  - NCAA Division I Football Championship (1978–1981, 1983, 2020, 2021, 2023–2024)
- NHL on ABC
  - NHL Thanksgiving Showdown (2021)
- PGA Tour on ABC (1962–2009)
  - The Open Championship (1962–2009)
  - PGA Championship (1966–1990)
  - U.S. Open (1966–1994)
  - Senior Open Championship (1990–2009)
  - LPGA Kraft Nabisco Championship (1991–2005)
  - Women's British Open (2001–2009)
  - CME Group Tour Championship, Final round (2015–2018)
  - Monday Night Golf (1999–2005)
- Olympics on ABC
  - Winter Olympic Games (1964, 1968, quadrennial from 1976 to 1988)
  - Summer Olympic Games (quadrennial from 1968 to 1976 and 1984)
- Wide World of Sports (1961–1998 as a series, weekend afternoon programming title 1998–2006)
- Thoroughbred Racing on ABC
  - Kentucky Derby (1975–2000)
  - Preakness Stakes (1977–2000)
  - Belmont Stakes (1986–2000, 2006–2010)
  - Breeders' Cup (2008–2011)
- Tennis on ESPN
  - BNP Paribas Open (2011–2012, 2019)
  - A highlight show on the Championships' rest day (2012–2021)
- Soccer
  - FIFA World Cup (1970, 1982 and quadrennial from 1994 to 2014)
  - North American Soccer League (1979–1981)
  - MLS Cup (1996–2008, 2019, 2021)
  - MLS on ESPN (1996–2008, 2020–2022)
  - FIFA Women's World Cup (1999, 2003 and 2011)
  - UEFA European Championship (2008, 2012, 2016, 2021)
  - SheBelieves Cup (2022)
  - UEFA Nations League (2020)
  - FIFA World Cup qualification (2021)
  - Serie A (2021)
  - Bundesliga (2021–2026)
- Auto racing
  - NASCAR on ABC (1961, 1971, 1975–1976, 1979–2000, 2007–2014)
  - Indianapolis 500 (1965–2018)
  - IndyCar Series on ABC (1996–2018)
  - Championship Auto Racing Teams (1983–2001, 2007)
  - International Race of Champions (1974–1980, 1987–2001)
  - American Le Mans Series (2008–2009, 2011–2013)
  - Formula One (2018–2019; 2021–2025): Monaco Grand Prix (re-broadcast annually from 2018, 2019 and 2021–2023; available live from 2023 to 2025), Canadian Grand Prix, United States Grand Prix, Mexican Grand Prix, Miami Grand Prix (all coverage is simulcasted from Sky Sports F1)
- Figure skating
  - U.S. Figure Skating Championships (1962–2008)
  - World Figure Skating Championships (1962–2008)
  - Skate America (1992–2006)
- Fight of the Week (1960–1964)
- Professional Bowlers Tour (1962–1997)
- The Superstars (1973–1984, 1991–1994, 1998–2002)
- The American Sportsman (1965–1986)
- Scripps National Spelling Bee (2006–2010)
- ESPN Sports Saturday (2010–2015)
- Overwatch League (2019): Stage Semifinals & Finals

== Personalities ==
=== Current ===
==== Play-by-play ====
- NBA on ABC – Mike Breen, Ryan Ruocco, Dave Pasch, Mike Monaco, Drew Carter, Marc Kestecher
- NFL on ABC – Joe Buck, Dave Pasch, Bob Wischusen
  - NFL Flag Championships – Tom Hart
- WNBA on ABC – Ryan Ruocco, Tiffany Greene
- ABC College Football and Saturday Night Football – Chris Fowler, Rece Davis, Sean McDonough, Joe Tessitore, Bob Wischusen, Dave Pasch, Tom Hart, Matt Barrie, Mike Monaco, Roy Philpott, Anish Shroff, Wes Durham
- Major League Baseball on ABC – Jon Sciambi, Mike Monaco, Kevin Brown
- NHL on ABC – Sean McDonough, Bob Wischusen, Mike Monaco, John Buccigross, Steve Levy, John Kelly
- Little League World Series – Mike Monaco
- La Liga on ABC – Ian Darke, Rob Palmer, Adrian Healey
- NWSL on ABC – Jenn Hildreth, Mark Donaldson
- College Basketball on ABC – see List of ESPN College Basketball personalities
- NCAA Gymnastics on ABC – Bart Conner, John Roethlisberger
- UFL on ABC – Joe Tessitore, Lowell Galindo, Roy Philpott

==== Color commentators ====
- NBA on ABC – Richard Jefferson, Tim Legler, Doris Burke, Jay Bilas, Stephanie White, Cory Alexander, Jason Kidd, Jeremy Lin, P. J. Carlesimo, Steve Javie
- NFL on ABC – Troy Aikman, Kurt Warner, Jason Kelce, Louis Riddick, Russell Yurk, Mike Chase
  - NFL Flag Championships – Jordan Rodgers, Phoebe Schecter, Rebeca Landa
- WNBA on ABC – Rebecca Lobo, Debbie Antonelli, Monica McNutt, Carolyn Peck
- NHL on ABC – Ray Ferraro, Erik Johnson, Kevin Weekes, A. J. Mleczko, Cassie Campbell-Pascall, P. K. Subban, Dave Jackson
- ABC College Football and Saturday Night Football – Kirk Herbstreit, Greg McElroy, Jesse Palmer, Louis Riddick, Dusty Dvoracek, Roddy Jones, Chase Daniel, Brock Osweiler, Andre Ware, Jordan Rodgers, Kirk Morrison, Jay Walker, Bill LeMonnier, Matt Austin, Jerry McGinn
- Major League Baseball on ABC – Eduardo Pérez, David Ross, Doug Glanville, Jessica Mendoza, Todd Frazier, Adam Ottavino
- Little League World Series – Jessica Mendoza, Todd Frazier, Xavier Scruggs
- La Liga on ABC – Steve McManaman, Stewart Robson, Kasey Keller
- NWSL on ABC – Lianne Sanderson, Jordan Angeli
- College Basketball on ABC – see List of ESPN College Basketball personalities
- NCAA Gymnastics on ABC – Kathy Johnson Clarke, Aly Raisman
- UFL on ABC – Jordan Rodgers, Sam Acho, Cole Cubelic, Tom Luginbill, Harry Douglas, Eric Mac Lain, Kirk Morrison, Roddy Jones, Aaron Murray

==== Reporters ====
- NBA on ABC – Lisa Salters, Katie George, Jorge Sedano, Malika Andrews, Alyssa Lang, Vanessa Richardson, Tim MacMahon, Taylor McGregor
- NFL on ABC – Lisa Salters, Laura Rutledge, Molly McGrath, Peter Schrager
  - NFL Flag Championships – Katie George, Taylor Tannebaum
- WNBA on ABC – Holly Rowe, Rosalyn Gold-Onwude, Angel Gray, Christine Williamson, Brooke Weisbrod
- ABC College Football and Saturday Night Football – Holly Rowe, Katie George, Kris Budden, Stormy Buonantony, Taylor McGregor, Quint Kessenich, Paul Carcaterra, Dana Boyle, Sherree Burruss, Lauren Sisler, Dawn Davenport
- NFL Draft – Laura Rutledge
- NBA draft – Lisa Salters
- Major League Baseball on ABC – Buster Olney, Tim Kurkjian, Alden Gonzalez, Jesse Rogers
- Little League World Series – Jess Sims, Sebastian Salazar
- NHL on ABC – Emily Kaplan, Leah Hextall, Stormy Buonantony
- NCAA Gymnastics on ABC – Taylor Davis
- La Liga on ABC – Alexis Nunes, Gemma Soler, Sid Lowe
- College Basketball on ABC – see List of ESPN College Basketball personalities

==== Studio hosts ====
- ABC College Football and Saturday Night Football – Kevin Negandhi, Rece Davis, Matt Barrie, Kevin Connors, Laura Rutledge
- NBA Countdown – Malika Andrews, Jorge Sedano
- WNBA Countdown – Malika Andrews, Hannah Storm, Christine Williamson
- Inside the NBA – Ernie Johnson
- NHL on ABC – Steve Levy, John Buccigross
- NFL Draft – Rece Davis
- NBA draft – Kevin Negandhi
- NFL on ABC – Scott Van Pelt
- Baseball Tonight – Kevin Connors
- La Liga on ABC – Dan Thomas, Kay Murray
- NWSL on ABC – Kelsey Riggs Cuff

==== Studio analysts ====
- ABC College Football and Saturday Night Football – Booger McFarland, Desmond Howard, Pat McAfee, Kirk Herbstreit, Nick Saban, Joey Galloway, Tim Tebow, Jordan Rodgers, Roman Harper
- NBA Countdown – Kendrick Perkins, Kenny Smith, Brian Windhorst, Shams Charania, Jason Kidd
- WNBA Countdown – Chiney Ogwumike, Andraya Carter, Carolyn Peck, Monica McNutt
- Inside the NBA – Shaquille O'Neal, Kenny Smith, Charles Barkley
- NFL on ABC – Jason McCourty, Jason Kelce, Pat McAfee, Marcus Spears, Adam Schefter, Michelle Beisner-Buck
- NFL Draft – Kirk Herbstreit, Desmond Howard, Nick Saban, Pete Thamel, Field Yates, Mel Kiper Jr., Louis Riddick, Matt Miller, Adam Schefter
- NBA draft – Richard Jefferson, Kenny Smith, Jay Williams
- NHL on ABC – Mark Messier, P. K. Subban, T. J. Oshie, Erik Johnson, Kevin Weekes
- Baseball Tonight – Adam Ottavino, Jeff Passan, Tim Kurkjian
- La Liga on ABC – Craig Burley, Luis Garcia, Pablo Zabaleta, Alejandro Moreno, Kasey Keller
- NWSL on ABC – Ali Krieger

=== Former ===
==== Play-by-play ====
- College Football on ABC – Chris Schenkel, Gary Bender, Keith Jackson, Jim Lampley, Curt Gowdy, Brad Nessler, Brent Musburger, Bill Flemming, Tim Brant, Bud Campbell, Eric Collins, Dave Diles, Dan Dierdorf, Terry Gannon, Gary Gerould, Frank Gifford, Sean Grande, Charlie Jones, Chris Lincoln, Verne Lundquist, Dave Martin, Al Michaels, Gary Thorne, Roger Twibell, Corey McPherrin, Mike Tirico, Dr. Jerry Punch, Steve Zabriskie, Chip Tarkenton, Paul Page, Lynn Sanner, Adam Amin, Steve Levy, Mark Jones, Dave Flemming
- College Basketball on ABC – Keith Jackson, Brad Nessler, Al Trautwig, Al Michaels, Gary Bender, Roger Twibell, Brent Musburger, Fred White, Barry Tompkins, Dave Barnett, Jim Brinson, Tim Brant, Steve Physioc, Robin Roberts, Mike Goldberg, Bill Doleman, Jim Szoke, Ron Franklin, Dave Strader, Bob Carpenter, Terry Gannon, Gary Thorne
- Monday Night Football
  - (ABC Era) – Keith Jackson, Al Michaels, Frank Gifford, Mike Patrick, Brent Musburger
  - (ESPN simulcasts; Wild Card/Pro Bowl) – Mike Tirico, Sean McDonough, Joe Tessitore, Steve Levy, Chris Fowler
- Major League Baseball on ABC – Gary Bender, Jack Buck, Keith Jackson, Don Drysdale, Jim Lampley, Al Michaels, Bob Prince, Warner Wolf, Tim McCarver, Gary Thorne, Matt Vasgersian, Sean McDonough, Karl Ravech
- Olympics on ABC – Howard Cosell, Curt Gowdy, Chris Schenkel, Frank Gifford, Keith Jackson, Al Michaels, Bill Flemming, Tim Brant, Jack Whitaker, Sam Posey, Don Chevrier, Tim McCarver, Lynn Swann, Gary Bender, Donna de Varona, Arthur Ashe, Jim McKay, Dick Button, Stan Benham, Art Devlin, Jackie Stewart, Warner Wolf, Al Trautwig, Mike Adamle, Jiggs McDonald, Jim Lampley, Bob Beattie, Diana Nyad, Mario Machado, Mike Eruzione
- Pro Bowlers Tour – Chris Schenkel
- MLS on ESPN – Phil Schoen, JP Dellacamera, Rob Stone, Jack Edwards, Dave O'Brien, Adrian Healey, Jon Champion, Steve Cangialosi
- NBA on ABC – Adam Amin, Jim Durham, Terry Gannon, Michael Grady, Al Michaels, Brent Musburger, Brad Nessler, Mike Tirico, John Saunders, Bill Flemming, Chet Forte, Jim Gordon, Curt Gowdy, Jerry Gross, Keith Jackson, Jim McKay, Chris Schenkel, Beth Mowins, Mark Jones
- NHL on ABC – Gary Thorne, Mike Emrick, Al Michaels, Dave Strader, Tom Mees, Bob Miller, Sam Rosen
- WNBA on ABC – Terry Gannon, Mark Jones, Mark Kestecher, Beth Mowins, Michele Tafoya, Pam Ward, Bob Wischusen
- Wide World of Sports – see Wide World of Sports (American TV series)#Event announcers
- NASCAR on ABC / IndyCar Series on ABC – Bob Jenkins, Jerry Punch, Marty Reid, Allen Bestwick
- XFL/UFL – Steve Levy, Tom Hart, Matt Barrie, John Schriffen, Mike Monaco, Drew Carter, Jorge Sedano, Mark Jones
- Serie A on ABC – Mark Donaldson, Steve Cangialosi, Ross Dyer
- Bundesliga on ABC – Derek Rae
- International Soccer on ABC – Martin Tyler, Ian Darke, Jon Champion, Derek Rae, JP Dellacamera, Glenn Davis, Jim Proudfoot, Adrian Healey, Steve Cangialosi, Mark Donaldson
- Formula One – see Sky Sports F1
- UFC on ABC – Jon Anik, Brendan Fitzgerald, John Gooden

==== Color commentators ====
- College Football on ABC – Gary Danielson, Bob Griese, Chris Spielman, Ray Bentley, Dean Blevins, Terry Bowden, Tim Brant, Terry Brennan, Frank Broyles, Fran Curci, Duffy Daugherty, Steve Davis, Dan Dierdorf, John Dockery, Forest Evashevski, Rick Forzano, Dan Fouts, Russ Francis, Mike Golic, Lee Grosscup, Terry Hanratty, Brian Holloway, Jackie Jensen, Mike McGee, Ben Martin, Mike Mayock, David M. Nelson, David Norrie, Ara Parseghian, Dan Reeves, Reggie Rivers, Pepper Rodgers, Darrell Royal, Bo Schembechler, John Spagnola, Monty Stickles, Lynn Swann, Dick Vermeil, Paul Warfield, Bud Wilkinson, Jamal Anderson, Brian Griese, Todd Blackledge, Todd McShay, John Parry, Robert Griffin III, Dan Mullen
- College Basketball on ABC – Jim Valvano
- Monday Night Football
  - (ABC era) – Don Meredith, John Madden, Frank Gifford, Dan Dierdorf, Boomer Esiason, O. J. Simpson, Howard Cosell, Fred Williamson, Alex Karras, Fran Tarkenton, Joe Namath, Dennis Miller, Dan Fouts
  - (ESPN simulcasts; Wild Card/Pro Bowl) – Jon Gruden, Jason Witten, Booger McFarland, Brian Griese, Kirk Herbstreit, Dan Orlovsky, John Parry, Jerry Bergman
- Major League Baseball on ABC – Reggie Jackson, Tim McCarver, Jim Palmer, Howard Cosell, Chipper Jones, Alex Rodriguez, David Cone
- PGA Tour on ABC – Nick Faldo, Paul Azinger, Ian Baker-Finch, Peter Alliss, Curtis Strange, Jack Nicklaus
- Olympics on ABC – Donna de Varona, O. J. Simpson, Mark Spitz, Digger Phelps
- Pro Bowlers Tour – Billy Welu, Nelson Burton Jr.
- MLS on ESPN – Alexi Lalas, Kyle Martino, John Harkes, Eric Wynalda, Ty Keough, Julie Foudy, Taylor Twellman, Alejandro Moreno, Brian Dunseth, Herculez Gomez, Kasey Keller
- NASCAR on ABC – Dale Jarrett, Andy Petree, Larry Nuber, Benny Parsons, Ned Jarrett
- NHL on ABC – Bill Clement, John Davidson, Joe Micheletti, Darren Pang, Barry Melrose, Jim Schoenfeld, Brian Engblom, Brian Hayward, Brian Boucher, Ryan Callahan
- Triple Crown – Charlsie Cantey
- NBA on ABC – Sean Elliott, Steve Jones, Dan Majerle, Jack Ramsay, Tom Tolbert, Jeff Van Gundy, Mark Jackson, Doc Rivers, J.J. Redick, Hubie Brown, Bob Myers
- Rugby World Cup – Grant Fox
- Indianapolis 500 – Jackie Stewart, Sam Posey
- IndyCar Series on ABC – Eddie Cheever, Scott Goodyear
- Serie A on ABC – Matteo Bonatti, Janusz Michallik
- Bundesliga on ABC – Stewart Robson, Kasey Keller, Lutz Pfannenstiel
- International Soccer on ABC – Steve McManaman, Stewart Robson, Efan Ekoku, Craig Burley, Ally McCoist, Kasey Keller, Alejandro Moreno, Andy Gray, Tommy Smyth, Paul Mariner, Taylor Twellman
- WNBA on ABC – Doris Burke, Andrea Joyce, Kara Lawson, Nancy Lieberman, Lisa Malosky, Ann Meyers, Stephanie Ready, LaChina Robinson
- XFL/UFL – Greg McElroy, Joey Galloway, Ian Fitzsimmons
- Formula One – see Sky Sports F1
- UFC on ABC – Michael Bisping, Daniel Cormier, Paul Felder

==== Reporters ====
- Monday Night Football – Lynn Swann, Lesley Visser, Melissa Stark, Michele Tafoya, Sam Ryan, Eric Dickerson, Lisa Guerrero, Suzy Kolber, Katie George, Peter Schrager
- Major League Baseball on ABC – Lesley Visser, John Saunders, Jim Gray, Gary Thorne, Joe Morgan, Taylor McGregor
- College Football on ABC – Lynn Swann, Jenn Brown, Lisa Salters, Erin Andrews, Jack Arute, Todd Harris, Shannon Spake, Heather Cox, Sam Ponder, Tom Rinaldi, Maria Taylor, Allison Williams, Molly McGrath
- College Basketball on ABC – Thea Andrews
- PGA Tour on ABC – Bob Rosburg, Billy Ray Brown, Judy Rankin
- NASCAR on ABC/IndyCar Series on ABC – Chris Economaki, Bill Weber, Jerry Punch, Vince Welch, Dave Burns, Rick DeBruhl, Jamie Little
- NHL on ABC – Al Morganti, Bob Neumeier, Brenda Brenon, Mark Jones, Sam Ryan, Brian Engblom, Darren Pang, Steve Levy, Erin Andrews, Joe Micheletti, Daryl Reaugh, Mickey Redmond, Christine Simpson, Tony Granato, Blake Bolden
- NBA on ABC – David Aldridge, Heather Cox, Mark Jones, Sal Masekela, Michele Tafoya, Stuart Scott, Tom Rinaldi, Malika Andrews, Cassidy Hubbarth
- Saturday Night Football – Lisa Salters, Erin Andrews, Heather Cox, Sam Ponder, Tom Rinaldi, Maria Taylor
- MLS on ESPN – Brandi Chastain, Heather Mitts, Lorrie Fair, Allen Hopkins, Roger Twibell, Julie Stewart-Binks, Sebastian Salazar, Cristina Alexander, Jillian Sakovits
- Bundesliga on ABC – Archie Rhind-Tutt
- WNBA on ABC – Heather Cox, Andrea Joyce, Lisa Malosky, Stephanie Ready, Michele Tafoya
- XFL/UFL – Dianna Russini, Pat McAfee, Molly McGrath, Katie George, Taylor McGregor, Stormy Buonantony, Ian Fitzsimmons, Kayla Burton
- Formula One – see Sky Sports F1
- UFC on ABC – Megan Olivi, Heidi Androl, John Gooden

==== Studio hosts ====
- NFL on ABC – Chris Berman, Brent Musburger, Frank Gifford, Al Michaels, Jim Lampley, Keith Jackson Suzy Kolber, Sam Ponder
- Olympics on ABC – Jim McKay, Chris Schenkel, Jim Lampley, Keith Jackson, Frank Gifford, Kathie Lee Gifford, Kathleen Sullivan, Donna de Varona
- Wide World of Sports – Jim McKay, Frank Gifford, Julie Moran, Robin Roberts, John Saunders, Becky Dixon
- NHL on ABC – Al Michaels, John Saunders, Chris Berman, Arda Ocal
- IndyCar Series on ABC – Jim McKay, Chris Schenkel, Al Michaels, Bob Jenkins, Paul Page, Brent Musburger, Lindsay Czarniak, Nicole Briscoe, Charlie Brockman, Dave Diles, Terry Gannon, Jackie Stewart, Keith Jackson
- NASCAR on ESPN – Brent Musburger, Nicole Briscoe
- NBA on ABC – Dan Patrick, John Saunders, Stuart Scott, Sage Steele, Hannah Storm, Michelle Beadle, Rachel Nichols, Maria Taylor, Mike Greenberg
- NFL Draft – Robin Roberts
- College Football on ABC – Bud Palmer, Merle Harmon, Dave Diles, Warner Wolf, Andrea Kirby, Chris Schenkel, Jim Lampley, Jack Whitaker, Al Trautwig, Jim Hill, Roger Twibell, John Saunders
- MLS on ESPN – Adrian Healey, Sebastian Salazar
- Bundesliga on ABC – Kay Murray
- International Soccer on ABC – Mike Tirico, Bob Ley, Chris Fowler, Rece Davis, Kelly Cates, Brent Musburger, Jim McKay, Lynsey Hipgrave, Kay Murray

==== Studio analysts ====
- NFL on ABC – Lynn Swann, Mike Adamle, Dick Vermeil, Bob Griese, Boomer Esiason, Steve Young, Michael Irvin, Tom Jackson, Keyshawn Johnson, Mike Ditka, Cris Carter, Trent Dilfer, Ray Lewis, Matt Hasselbeck, Charles Woodson, Louis Riddick, Robert Griffin III, Randy Moss, Booger McFarland, Tedy Bruschi, Rex Ryan, Ryan Clark
- NBA on ABC – Avery Johnson, Doug Collins, Steve Jones, George Karl, Paul Pierce, Scottie Pippen, Byron Scott, Bill Simmons, Tom Tolbert, Bill Walton, Chauncey Billups, Jay Williams, Jalen Rose, Adrian Wojnarowski, Michael Wilbon, Udonis Haslem, Bob Myers, Stephen A. Smith, Michael Malone
- NFL Draft – Lee Corso, Daniel Jeremiah, Michael Irvin, Kurt Warner, Booger McFarland, Todd McShay
- NHL on ABC – Barry Melrose, John Davidson, Chris Chelios, Brian Boucher, John Tortorella
- MLS on ESPN – Alejandro Moreno, Brian Dunseth, Herculez Gomez, Kasey Keller
- Bundesliga on ABC – Jürgen Klinsmann, Jan Åge Fjørtoft, Craig Burley, Kasey Keller, Steve Cherundolo, Thomas Hitzlsperger

==== Behind-the-scenes personnel ====
- Chuck Howard
- Edgar J. Scherick
- Robert Riger
- Eleanor Sanger

== Presidents ==
=== ABC Sports ===
- Roone Arledge (1968–1986)
- Dennis Swanson (1986–1996)
- Steve Bornstein (1996–1999)
- Howard Katz (1999–2003)
- George Bodenheimer (2003–2006)

=== ESPN ===
- Steve Bornstein (1990–1998)
- George Bodenheimer (1998–2012)
- John Skipper (2012–2017)
- James Pitaro (2018–present)

== Main competitors ==
- Skydance Sports
  - TNT Sports
    - TNT
    - TBS
    - TruTV
    - HBO Max
  - CBS Sports
    - CBS
    - CBS Sports Network
    - Paramount+
- Fox Sports
  - Fox
  - Fox Sports 1
  - Fox Sports 2
  - Tubi
  - Fox Deportes
- NBC Sports/Telemundo Deportes
  - NBC
  - NBCSN
  - Peacock
  - Telemundo
