= WNBA on ABC =

- Genre: WNBA basketball telecasts
- Directed by: Bonnie Reilly
- Starring: Ryan Ruocco; Rebecca Lobo; Holly Rowe; Malika Andrews; Andraya Carter; Monica McNutt; Rosalyn Gold-Onwude; Carolyn Peck; Chiney Ogwumike
- Country of origin: United States
- Original language: English

Production
- Producer: Rodney Vaughn
- Camera setup: Multi-camera
- Running time: 120 minutes+
- Production companies: ABC Sports (2003–2006); ESPN (2006–present)

Original release
- Network: ABC (2003–present); Disney+ (2024–present; simulcasts); ESPN DTC (2025–present; simulcasts)
- Release: May 24, 2003 – present

Related
- WNBA on ESPN; NBA on ABC

The WNBA on ABC is an American television sports presentation show broadcast by ABC. It premiered on May 24, 2003. The consists of branding used for presentation of Women's National Basketball Association.

== Background ==
In the early years, two women's-oriented networks, Lifetime and Oxygen, also broadcast games including the first game of the WNBA. NBC showed games from 1997 to 2002 as part of their NBA on NBC coverage before the league transferred the rights to ABC/ESPN.

=== Coverage breakdown ===
In June 2007, the WNBA signed a contract extension with ESPN. The new television deal ran from 2009 to 2016. A minimum of 18 games would be broadcast on ABC, ESPN, and ESPN2 each season; the rights to broadcast the first regular-season game and the All-Star Game were held by ABC. Additionally, a minimum of 11 postseason games would be broadcast on any of the three stations. Along with this deal, came the first-ever rights fees to be paid to a women's professional sports league. Over the eight years of the contract, "millions and millions of dollars" would be "dispersed to the league's teams".

- WNBA All-Star Game
- Select WNBA regular season games
- Select Sunday game of the WNBA Finals (usually the first scheduled Sunday game airing at 3:30 PM ET)

Initially, Saturday and Sunday afternoon games were broadcast on ABC. But over time that changed. For 2013, only one game was shown on ABC on Saturday, June 8, and thirteen games were shown on ESPN2 on five different days of the week (no WNBA games were shown on Sunday or Friday on ESPN2). On opening day for the 2008 season (May 17), ABC broadcast the Los Angeles Sparks and Phoenix Mercury matchup. The game received a little over 1 million viewers. Average viewership for games broadcast on national television (ABC and ESPN2) was 413,000 (up from 346,000 in 2007). Average viewership for the 2007 WNBA finals was 545,000.

Viewership for the 2011 WNBA All-Star Game on ABC was up 46% from the previous game. Game 1 of the 2015 WNBA Finals telecast on ABC, drew 571,000 viewers, up from 558,000 for Game 1 in 2014. Game 1 of the 2016 WNBA Finals was broadcast on ABC and had 0.5 overnight rating (597,000 viewers), which was the best since 2010. The five game 2016 Finals broadcast on ABC, ESPN and ESPN2 averaged a 0.3 rating and 487,000 viewers. Average viewership in 2016 was 224,000 viewers.

== Announcers ==
=== Current ===
==== Play-by-play ====
- Ryan Ruocco (lead)
- Beth Mowins
- Tiffany Greene

==== Color commentators ====
- Rebecca Lobo (lead)
- Carolyn Peck
- Debbie Antonelli
- Monica McNutt

==== Sideline reporter ====
- Holly Rowe (lead)
- Angel Gray
- Brooke Weisbrod
- Rosalyn Gold-Onwude

=== Former ===
==== Play-by-play ====
- Terry Gannon
- Mark Jones
- Mark Kestecher
- Dave Pasch
- Michele Tafoya
- Pam Ward
- Bob Wischusen

==== Color commentators ====
- Greg Anthony
- Geno Auriemma
- Doris Burke
- Andrea Joyce
- Kara Lawson
- Nancy Lieberman
- Lisa Malosky
- Ann Meyers
- LaChina Robinson
- Pat Summitt

==== Sideline reporter ====
- Doris Burke
- Heather Cox
- Andrea Joyce
- Rebecca Lobo
- Lisa Malosky
- Stephanie Ready
- Michele Tafoya

Preceded by NBC	WNBA network broadcast partner 2003–present with CBS (2019–present) with NBC (2026–future)	Succeeded by Incumbent
