= WNBA on ESPN =

US television program

- Current logo used since the 2023 WNBA season
- Also known as: ESPN Woman's Sports Sundays
- Genre: WNBA basketball telecasts
- Starring: Ryan Ruocco; Rebecca Lobo; Holly Rowe
- Country of origin: United States

Production
- Running time: 120 minutes+

Original release
- Network: ESPN (1997–present); ESPN2 (2001–present); ABC (2003–present); ESPN Deportes (2004–present; Spanish-language)
- Release: June 23, 1997 – present

Related
- WNBA on ABC; WNBA on Lifetime; NBA on ESPN

The WNBA on ESPN is an American television sports presentation show broadcast by ESPN. It premiered on June 23, 1997. It consists of branding used for the presentation of Women's National Basketball Association games.

== Background ==
In June 2003, the WNBA signed a new six-year agreement with ABC Sports and ESPN to televise regular-season games and playoff games from 2003 through 2008. It was also announced that ESPN2 would televise a half-hour pre-game show before each broadcast. In June 2007, the WNBA signed another contract extension with ESPN. The new television deal ran from 2009 to 2016. A minimum of 18 games would be broadcast on ABC, ESPN, and ESPN2 each season. Additionally, a minimum of 11 postseason games would be broadcast on any of the three stations.

Along with this deal came the first ever rights fees to be paid to a women's professional sports league. WNBA president Donna Orender and John Skipper, ESPN vice president for content, gave no exact figure but said it was worth "millions and millions of dollars".

Beginning with the 2009 WNBA season, all nationally broadcast WNBA games are shown in high definition.

On March 28, 2013, ESPN and the WNBA announced they had extended their agreement through 2022. Under the agreement, there will be up to 30 games a year televised on ABC, ESPN or ESPN2 each season, including the Finals. Although the financial terms of the deal were not stated by ESPN or the WNBA, Sports Business Daily reported that sources said the deal was worth $12 million a year. In 2014, ESPN and the WNBA renegotiated the television rights deal to $25 million per year.

== Announcers ==
Announcers change from year to year, but recent play-by-play personalities have included Terry Gannon, Mark Jones, Marc Kestecher, Beth Mowins, Dave Pasch, Ryan Ruocco, Pam Ward and Bob Wischusen. Generally, game broadcasts include a pair of announcers—alongside those providing play-by-play are the color analysts which have included Doris Burke, Andrea Joyce, Kara Lawson, Nancy Lieberman, Lisa Malosky, Ann Meyers, Stephanie Ready, LaChina Robinson, Carolyn Peck, Rebecca Lobo.

These broadcasts also commonly include a sideline reporter. Recent sideline reporters have included Heather Cox, Andrea Joyce, Lisa Malosky, Stephanie Ready, Holly Rowe, Michele Tafoya and Rebecca Lobo.

During halftime of the broadcasts, Cindy Brunson and more recently Doris Burke provide game analysis and other sports updates.

=== Play-by-play ===
- Ryan Ruocco – lead play-by-play
- Tiffany Greene – #2 play-by-play
- Beth Mowins – #3 play-by-play

=== Color commentators ===
- Rebecca Lobo – lead color commentator
- Debbie Antonelli – #2 color commentator
- Monica McNutt – #3 color commentator
- Carolyn Peck – #4 color commentator

=== Sideline reporters ===
- Holly Rowe – lead sideline reporter
- Angel Gray – #2 sideline reporter
- Brooke Weisbrod – #2 sideline reporter
- Rosalyn Gold-Onwude – #4 sideline reporter

=== Studio host ===
- Malika Andrews – WNBA Countdown studio lead host (2026–present)
- Hannah Storm – WNBA Countdown studio secondary host (2026–present)

=== Studio analysts ===
- Chiney Ogwumike – lead studio analyst
- Andraya Carter – co-lead studio analyst
- Monica McNutt – lead studio analyst
- Carolyn Peck – rotating studio analyst

== Wired ==
One unique aspect of WNBA coverage on the ESPN family of networks is that many of the participants wear live microphones. Starting with the 2003 WNBA All Star Game (which aired on ABC), most games televised have involved coaches, players and referees being wired for sound. On some occasions, the sound of players and coaches talking will overlap with commentary; also, on several occasions, ESPN has had to mute the sound because of expletives.

=== Controversy ===
During the 2006 WNBA Finals, Detroit Shock head coach, and former ESPN NBA analyst, Bill Laimbeer became irritated by ESPN's coverage, quoted by the Detroit Free Press as saying:

I just hear from our family and friends back home that, 'Boy, ESPN is killing you guys,' ... 'And (Nancy) Lieberman and Doris Burke are just trashing you left and right.' Not only me, but also some of our players on our ballclub. ... We're telling ESPN today to basically stick it.

Laimbeer banned ESPN from the Shock locker room for Game 4 of the series, and also refused to wear a live microphone for that game (as had been the custom throughout the regular season and the playoffs).

Former Connecticut Sun head coach Mike Thibault admitted that he does not like having a microphone on during games. He also said that he sometimes finds himself turning the microphone off.

== Viewership ==
Old logo

Initially, Saturday and Sunday afternoon games were broadcast on ABC. Tuesday night games were broadcast on ESPN2. But over time that changed. For 2013, only one game was shown on ABC on Saturday, June 8, and thirteen games were shown on ESPN2 on five different days of the week (no WNBA games were shown on Sunday or Friday on ESPN2). On opening day for the 2008 season (May 17), ABC broadcast the Los Angeles Sparks and Phoenix Mercury matchup. The game received a little over 1 million viewers. Average viewership for games broadcast on national television (ABC and ESPN2) was 100(up from 0 in 2007). Average viewership for the 2007 WNBA finals was 500.

In 2008, the WNBA finished up in key demographics on ESPN2—Women 18–34 (+71%) and Men 18–34 (+28%) – and on ABC—All Women (+10%) and Women 18–34 (+20%).

The 2009 regular season on ESPN2 (13 telecasts) concluded with an average of 269,000 viewers, up 8% vs. 2008 season (248,000 viewers). In addition, regular-season games on ESPN2 saw increases in key demographics, including men 18–34 (+9%), men 18–49 (+14%) and men 23–54 (+23%). The WNBA finals between the Mercury and Fever had the highest average ratings (548,000 viewers), since average finals ratings began being recorded in 2007.

=== 2010s ===
The 2011 season on ESPN2 averaged 270,000 viewers per game, the league's highest since 2005 and up 5% from an average of 258,000 in 2010. Viewership for the 2011 WNBA All-Star Game on ABC was up 46% from the previous game.

Game 2 of the 2012 WNBA Finals between the Indiana Fever and Minnesota Lynx was broadcast on ESPN (games 1,3 and 4 were on ESPN2) and received 778,000 viewers and a .6 household rating. This was the highest rated WNBA broadcast on ESPN since a 1999 Western Conference Finals game between the Houston Comets and Los Angeles Sparks received 1,052,000 viewers and a 1.1 household rating. The average viewership for the 4 finals games in 2012 was 477,000.

For 2013 the league averaged 231,000 viewers for 13 games on ESPN2, a 28% gain over the 180,000 average audience for nine telecasts in 2012. The 2013 WNBA Finals games averaged 344,000 viewers.

The 180,000 viewers for 9 games in 2012 was the lowest regular season WNBA ESPN2 ratings, with 2005 having the highest regular season ratings at 282,000. Two 2012 games broadcast on ESPN averaged 359,000 viewers (one game on ABC had 804,000 viewers). In 2013 ESPN said that their WNBA audience was majority male, as it had been for years. 66% of the viewers were male and almost half were African-Americans.

Viewership for the 19 games broadcast for the 2014 regular season was an average of 240,000. The ratings on ESPN2 for the conference semifinals were a household rating of 0.2 versus 0.1 in 2013 and 262,000 viewers versus 200,000 in 2013. The 2014 WNBA finals averaged 659,000 viewers across the ESPN channels, up 91% from the 2013 finals between the Minnesota Lynx and the Atlanta Dream which averaged 345,000. Overall, the 2014 playoffs averaged a 0.3 rating and 489,000 viewers on the ESPN networks, up from 0.2 and 272,000 in 2013.

In 2015, ESPN2 televised ten regular season games, and ESPN one, for an average of 202,000 viewers. Game one of the finals telecast on ABC, drew 571,000 viewers, up from 558,000 for game 1 in 2014. Game three of the finals drew 432,000 viewers, and game five drew 583,000, both on ESPN2.

Game 1 of the 2016 WNBA Finals was broadcast on ABC and had 0.5 overnight rating (597,000 viewers), which was the best since 2010. The 5 game 2016 Finals broadcast on ABC, ESPN and ESPN2 averaged a 0.3 rating and 487,000 viewers. Average viewership in 2016 was 224,000 viewers.

2017 viewership hit an all-time low with 171,000 average regular season viewers. 2018 regular season viewership across ESPN and ABC increased 35% over 2017 to 231,000. 2019 the regular season WNBA viewership across ESPN and ABC networks averaged a combined 246,000 viewers.

=== 2020s ===
The 2020 regular season averaged 205,000 viewers across ESPN, ESPN2 and ABC (37 telecasts), down 16% from last year (246K).

Preceded by League created	WNBA pay television carrier 1997–present with Lifetime (1997–2000) with Oxygen (2002–2004) with CBSSN (2019–2025) with Prime Video (2021–present) with USA/Peacock (2026–present)	Succeeded by Incumbent
