= WNBA on Oxygen =

- Genre: WNBA basketball telecasts
- Directed by: Suzanne Smith
- Starring: Debbie Antonelli; Krista Blunk; Swin Cash; Heather Cox; Eric Frede; Mark Morgan; Beth Mowins; Sue Wicks
- Country of origin: United States
- Original language: English
- No. of seasons: 3

Production
- Executive producer: Lydia Stephans
- Camera setup: Multi-camera
- Running time: 120 minutes+
- Production company: Oxygen Sports

Original release
- Network: Oxygen
- Release: June 4, 2002 – 2004

Related
- WNBA on NBC

The WNBA on Oxygen is an American television sports presentation show broadcast by Oxygen. It aired from June 4, 2002 to 2004. It consists of branding used for the presentation of Women's National Basketball Association games. Prior to 2005, the channel carried a limited schedule of regular season WNBA games produced by NBA TV. Oxygen had de facto picked up the games that previously aired on Lifetime.

== Coverage ==
Oxygen's relationship with the WNBA began with a two-year agreement that called for them to televise a minimum of 11 games on Tuesday nights during the 2002 season and weekly games as well as playoff action during the 2003 season. Oxygen joined NBC, ESPN and ESPN2 in televising WNBA games for the 2002 season. The deal called for NBA Productions to produce the games, and the league would sell the ad time. Oxygen meanwhile, would get promotional spots during the games. Oxygen however, would provide the announcers and handle the halftime on-air duties themselves. Oxygen's halftime reports were sponsored by AIG VALIC.

For the 2003 season, Oxygen averaged a 0.2 rating for its 13-game regular-season WNBA schedule. They were also expected to air at least two playoff games (such as Game 3s of the WNBA conference semifinals), with the possibility of airing up to four. By 2004, Oxygen's ratings dropped to a 0.1 from a 0.2, though only five games aired on the network that year compared with 13 from 2003.

== Commentators ==
- Debbie Antonelli (color commentary)
- Krista Blunk (color commentary)
- Swin Cash (studio analyst)
- Heather Cox (color commentary)
- Eric Frede (play-by-play)
- Mark Morgan (studio host)
- Beth Mowins (play-by-play)
- Sue Wicks (studio analyst)

== See also ==
- Women's National Basketball Association#Media coverage
