= Mark Jones (sportscaster) =

Canadian sportscaster

- Born: Mark Vernon Jones; November 16, 1961 (age 65); Toronto, Ontario, Canada
- Education: York University
- Occupation: Sportscaster
- Years active: 1986–present
- Television: ABC and ESPN (1990–2026); The Sports Network (1986–1990); NBC Sports California (2020–present)

Mark Vernon Jones (born November 16, 1961) is a Canadian sportscaster who is the primary play-by-play announcer for Sacramento Kings games on NBC Sports California. Jones was a member of the ESPN (ABC) broadcasting family from 1990 to 2026. Before then Jones worked for The Sports Network (TSN) in Canada. He mostly worked college football, NBA and WNBA games on ABC and ESPN during his time with the network.

== Early life ==
Jones, a native of Toronto, graduated from York University there in 1985 with a bachelor's in economics. He also played on the school's men's basketball team, earning all-conference honors.

== Biography ==
Mark Vernon Jones was born on November 16, 1961.

=== Basketball career ===
Jones attended York University and played basketball. He led the team to three Ontario Universities Athletics Association (OUAA) championships in 1981, 1984 and 1985. During his career, Jones was one of the top players in the OUAA, earning conference second-team all-star honours in 1984 and 1985. In 1986, he finished his career with a first-team all-star nod. A prolific guard for the Yeomen, Jones still ranks in the program's top five all-time in total assists and steals. He was inducted into the York's Sport Hall of Fame in 2016.

=== Broadcasting career ===
Before Jones assumed his roles at ESPN, he worked for The Sports Network (TSN) in Canada from 1986 to 1990 as an anchor and hosted a Toronto Blue Jays magazine show.

Jones began his ESPN career as the host of the weekly NBA show, the NBA Today. He would usually end the show by shooting an imaginary basketball into the air as the studio lights went off. Jones currently does play-by-play on NBA games paired with any one of ESPN's current NBA game analysts like Jon Barry, Hubie Brown, Jay Bilas, P.J. Carlesimo, Doris Burke, Bob Myers and Stephanie White. Jones has worked NBA games in the past with Bill Walton until Walton left NBA coverage during the 2009–10 season and also with Doug Collins. He was the primary host of KIA NBA Shootaround, the network's pregame show. On the program, he engaged Walton and Stephen A. Smith in topical debates about issues in the NBA. Jones has done some sideline reporting for NBA games.

Until 2023, Jones was the lead play-by-play announcer on ABC's NBA Sunday Showcase with Doris Burke. He also is on ESPN's college football, where he teams up with analyst Louis Riddick on the network's coverage on ESPN, ESPN2 or ABC. He formerly called men's SEC college basketball games on Saturday with analyst Kara Lawson. He has also done play-by-play and/or reporting for women's college basketball, the WNBA, and the NHL.

Jones has also occasionally served as an anchor/reporter for SportsCenter. He has contributed to NBA All-Star Weekend (Celebrity Game), NBA Draft Lottery, and also to the network's NBA Draft coverage.

He is the younger brother of Paul Jones, the radio play-by-play voice of the Toronto Raptors.

In September 2020, Jones made headlines with his outspoken support for the Black Lives Matter movement on Twitter.

Jones was named the primary TV play-by-play announcer for the Sacramento Kings in 2020.

On March 11, 2022, ESPN announced a multi-year extension for Jones.

On May 29, 2022, Jones filled in for ESPN's lead NBA play–by–play announcer Mike Breen for the deciding Eastern Conference Final Game 7 between the Boston Celtics and Miami Heat. Breen had to sit out of the broadcast alongside commentators Jeff Van Gundy and Mark Jackson due to a positive COVID test. Jones also called the first two games of the NBA Finals featuring the Celtics and Golden State Warriors in Breen's absence.

On April 10, 2026, Jones announced that he would leave ESPN after a 36-year run. His last call for NBA final regular season coverage was a game between the Orlando Magic and the Boston Celtics.

== Career timeline ==
| Year | Title | Role | Network |
|---|---|---|---|
| 2003–2026 | NBA on ABC/ESPN | Play-by-play (secondary) | ABC/ESPN |
| 2003–2026 | WNBA on ABC/ESPN | Play-by-play (secondary) | ABC/ESPN |
| 2006–2025 | ESPN College Football | Play-by-play (secondary) | ABC/ESPN |
| 2020–present | Sacramento Kings | Play-by-play (lead) | NBC Sports California |
