= ESPN BottomLine =

Trademark for a lower-third sports information ticker graphic

ESPN BottomLine used since August 19, 2018.

ESPN BottomLine used from June 2014 to August 19, 2018.

BottomLine is ESPN's lower third sports information ticker. It is uniform in design and used on all ESPN networks. It displays current sports scores, stats, and headlines in a 'push-then-scroll' format. It also serves as a display for urgent information, such as breaking sports news, breaking significant national news from ESPN sister networks ABC and FX, updated scores, a rain delay notification, or the move of a game from one ESPN network to another. BottomLine is also used on the TSN channels in Canada and on the Latin American and Brazilean ESPN channels.

On special occasions, a customized version of the ticker may be used; some examples are Pi Day, in which a Pi symbol is placed next to the ESPN logo, and the 4th of July, when an American flag surrounds the ESPN logo.

== History ==
SportsCenter debuted a new graphics package on April 6, 2009, with the "rundown" graphic (shown during the daytime editions) moved to the left side of the screen. A new BottomLine was also released that day on ESPN, ESPN2, ESPN Classic, and ESPNU but it was quickly removed and reverted to the old BottomLine (which had been used since April 2003) because of major technical difficulties. The new BottomLine was functional during coverage of the 2009 NFL draft and the 2009 NBA Draft, but the issues were fixed and the it eventually returned on July 8 of the same year. Yet another redesigned BottomLine was launched at 11 PM ET on June 22, 2014, to coincide with a dramatic redesign of the SportsCenter studio.

On August 20, 2018, a refreshed BottomLine launched. The BottomLine switched to a "flipper" format, used two lines of text, and no longer showed the logos of teams during score updates (though team abbreviations still appeared in the second line of text). In addition, the rightmost third of the BottomLine now contains a rotating display of promotions for the ESPN family of networks and The Walt Disney Company as a whole, which can also be used to display breaking news or program advisories when needed.

== Variants ==
=== ESPN2 ===
In 1995, ESPN2 debuted a sports news ticker, dubbed by Production Assistant Onnie Bose as the "BottomLine Update." It is a persistent ticker which stayed at the bottom of the screen at all times during most programming, unlike ESPN, who only showed their own at the :18 (formerly :28) and :58 of each hour (accompanied by an audio cue, which has since been adapted as the alert tone for ESPN's mobile apps) and during select programming. The introductory audio cue was removed when the BottomLine graphics were updated in 2009. ESPN2's sports telecasts were also among the first to regularly use a scoring bug. In later years, ESPN2 would also participate in "Full Circle" telecasts, productions of a single game aired across multiple ESPN services to provide additional features and angles.

=== ESPNEWS ===
ESPNEWS's "bottom line" — a small rectangular area at the bottom one-fifth of the screen flashing scores—is more in-depth than the one airing on ESPN's other networks. It contains not only scores but also statistics and brief news alerts about the day's happenings in sports. It also remains on screen during most commercial breaks. This particular BottomLine was re-designed as the network was re-launched on March 30, 2008. The change from a big BottomLine to the ESPN-shaped BottomLine, the decrease of ESPNEWS programming, and SportsCenter being shown on ESPNEWS has had some controversy among longtime ESPNEWS viewers. The network was changed over to a full-screen presentation in June 2010 with the network receiving the BottomLine used on all other ESPN networks in anticipation of the network's primetime programming being rebranded under the SportsCenter branding.

=== ESPN on ABC ===
With ABC adopting ESPN production and imaging for sports broadcasts beginning in 2006, ABC has used ESPN's BottomLine during sports broadcasts, with its only differences being its branding, and being formatted to the 4:3 aspect ratio (as with all sports broadcasts on ABC) until ABC migrated to a 16:9 format for network programming for the 2016–17 television season (however BottomLine is not displayed when the network takes commercials, with a notable exception, the NFL draft, NBA draft and NHL games during intermissions). For SEC broadcasts starting in the 2024 season, the SEC on ABC logo is used instead of just the ABC logo.

=== ESPN on FX ===
In the 2023 XFL season, the BottomLine ticker is identical to ESPN's design and the broadcast presentation is similar to the ESPN on ABC broadcasts. The only exceptions is that the FX logo is in place of the ABC logo on the BottomLine ticker and the ESPN on FX logo in place of the ESPN on ABC logo on the top right, just like ESPN on ABC, the BottomLine ticker is not displayed when taking commercials, despite it being a cable network like all the other ESPN networks.

=== ESPN+ ===
For select events either an exclusive bottomline is displayed, if the event is simulcast of something also on the ESPN's cable network. It will use the corresponding network's bottomline, or not at all (like the ESPN on ABC bottomline, for example, is not used during commercials unless it is displayed on a network it’s simulcasting it)

=== TSN ===
The BottomLine ticker is identical to the ESPN's design. When TSN debuted the new BottomLine ticker as ESPN, differences on the right side include advertising of Bell Media's other properties such as Crave and CTV 2.

=== Cold Pizza ===
Cold Pizza was notable for having its own version of ESPN's BottomLine, as their ticker not only gave sports scores but also news headlines and weather forecasts from sports cities and is shown in its own color scheme. It also functioned differently: it constantly scrolled, while other ESPN "BottomLines" usually "flip" through the different scores, scrolling only for long statistical lines (until August 20, 2018, when the bottomline was updated to flip even through long statistical lines, as a result of the bottomline now being two lines rather than one). This graphic was discontinued in the summer of 2006 when the "BottomLine" was changed to resemble those of other ESPN programs.

=== College Football Playoff Megacast ===
The Playoff Megacasts for 2017 introduced a new statistical ticker, which shows info about the current drive, and stats about plays made. Unlike the others, it just fades out stats, instead of flipping.

For the 2018 semifinals, a newly redesigned version of the statistical ticker was unveiled.

=== Defunct Windows PC Ticker ===
From the Windows 98 era to the middle of the Windows XP era, a BottomLine ticker application using Macromedia Shockwave technology was available for personal use on a Windows personal computer (and was embeddable with credit as a part of personal websites). Its last update (version 2.1) was in August 2004.
