= WNBA on Lifetime =

- Genre: WNBA basketball telecasts
- Directed by: Lisa Seltzer
- Starring: Christine Brennan; Maura Driscoll; Camille Duvall-Hero; Fran Harris; Ann Meyers; Reggie Miller; Mary Murphy; Meghan Pattyson; Summer Sanders; Michele Tafoya; Suzyn Waldman
- Country of origin: United States
- Original language: English
- No. of seasons: 4

Production
- Executive producer: Brian Donlon
- Producers: Denise Cavanaugh; Amy Rosenfeld
- Camera setup: Multi-camera
- Running time: 120 minutes+
- Production companies: Lifetime Sports; ESPN

Original release
- Network: Lifetime
- Release: June 27, 1997 – August 24, 2000

Related
- WNBA on ESPN

The WNBA on Lifetime is an American television sports presentation show broadcast by Lifetime. It aired from June 27, 1997 to August 24, 2000. It consists of branding used for the presentation of Women's National Basketball Association games.

== Coverage ==
From its inaugural season in 1997 to 2000, Lifetime was one of three broadcasters of the WNBA, alongside NBC and ESPN. Lifetime as well as NBC and ESPN didn't pay the WNBA in rights fees.

By 1999, Lifetime was broadcasting 11 regular-season games on Friday nights, the All-Star Game at Madison Square Garden and three playoff dates.

In 2000, Lifetime phased out its live broadcasts and replaced them with an original series documenting the lives of WNBA players. The network stated that it wanted to focus on "stories" rather than event coverage; Lifetime transferred its package of games to ESPN2.

Lifetime's final live WNBA broadcast was Game 1 of the 2000 WNBA Championship on August 24. Lifetime also broadcast Game 1 of the WNBA Championship from the year prior.

=== Ratings ===
At the conclusion of the first WNBA season in 1997, Lifetime Television registered a 0.5 household rating, while ESPN scored a 0.8. Ratings were up 20 percent on Lifetime and 16 percent on ESPN from 1998 to 1999. However by 2000, Lifetime's WNBA ratings were down by 20 percent, and ESPN dropped by 29 percent.

Lifetime had created a problem in that being a specialty channel aimed at women, whenever a WNBA game aired on the network, the chances were that they were neglecting male viewers who would otherwise not watch cable channels marketed towards women.

== Commentators ==
- Christine Brennan (color commentator)
- Persefone Contos (studio host)
- Maura Driscoll (studio host)
- Camille Duvall-Hero (studio host)
- Fran Harris (color commentator)
- Ann Meyers (sideline reporter)
- Reggie Miller (color commentator)
- Mary Murphy (color commentator)
- Meghan Pattyson (color commentator)
- Summer Sanders (sideline reporter)
- Michele Tafoya (play-by-play)
- Suzyn Waldman (play-by-play)

Michelle Tafoya served as the lead play-by-play announcer for Lifetime, working alongside Meghan Pattyson and Reggie Miller on color commentary including Lifetime's coverage of the WNBA Championship in 1999 and 2000.

In 1997, the American Women in Radio and Television honored Tafoya with a Gracie Award for "Outstanding Achievement by an Individual On-Air TV Personality" for her play-by-play calling of WNBA games on Lifetime Television.

Upon being let go by the Sacramento Monarchs, Mary Murphy was hired by Brian Donlon, Lifetime Television's vice president of sports and executive producer, to be part of its WNBA broadcast team along with Michele Tafoya and Reggie Miller. Murphy started with her own halftime feature, "Murphy's Law" before joining Miller and Tafoya as a game analyst. When Lifetime ended its WNBA broadcasts in 2000, Murphy moved to ESPN for women's NCAA tournament games and WNBA broadcasts while Fox would bring her on board to call the Pac-12 women's games on FSN in the early 2000s.

In the league's inaugural season, Fran Harris was a member of the Houston Comets. She started one game for the Comets but played in 25 games coming off the bench, scoring a total of 104 points on the season as the Comets won the first-ever WNBA Championship. The next season, she was a starter for the Utah Starzz. At the end of the season, she was waived from the team's roster, and chose to retire and begin her career in broadcasting with TV partner, Lifetime.

== See also ==
- Women's National Basketball Association#Media coverage
- WNBA on ESPN
