= Stephanie Ready =

American basketball player-coach

- Born: November 30, 1974 (age 51); Takoma Park, Maryland, U.S.
- Occupations: Coach; sports analyst; television personality
- Years active: 1998–present
- Known for: Charlotte Hornets sideline reporter
- Website: Official Twitter account

Stephanie Ready (born November 30, 1974) is an American sports journalist. She previously worked for the NBA on TNT, and was formerly a broadcaster for the NBA's Charlotte Hornets. Prior to her broadcasting career, she was a basketball coach and gained recognition as the first female coach of a men's professional league team in 2001. After a stint as a head coach at the NBA Development League, she was a part of Hornets’ broadcasts for over a decade, including a stint as the first full-time female NBA game analyst.

== Personal life ==
Born in Takoma Park, Maryland, Ready attended National Cathedral School in Washington, D.C. followed by Coppin State University in Baltimore, where she played basketball and volleyball for the Coppin State Eagles. She ranked in the top 10 on the basketball career list in steals (2nd), assists (4th), points (8th) and rebounds (10th). Ready graduated cum laude with a bachelor's degree in psychology. Ebony magazine named her one of "The 56 Most Intriguing Blacks of 2001" along with Shaquille O'Neal, Kobe Bryant, and Michael Jordan.

== Career ==
Coppin State athletic director Ron "Fang" Mitchell urged Ready to hold off on graduate school and instead to pursue coaching, and he hired Ready to coach the women's volleyball team. Ready was hired two weeks before the start of the season, at the time, Ready was one of the youngest Division I volleyball coaches in the country and soon an 129-match losing streak of Lady Eagles' was snapped. Mitchell called upon Ready again to assist him on the bench for Coppin State's men's basketball team. She became only the third woman ever to coach Division I men's basketball; Jennifer Johnston of Oakland University in Michigan, and Bernadette Mattox, who coached at the University of Kentucky from 1990 to 1995 under former coach Rick Pitino, were the others. Of the three, Ready was the only woman who was allowed to recruit off-campus. "It was a no-brainer", Mitchell said of his decision to hire Ready. "She's very detail-oriented and one of the most organized people I've had a pleasure to work with."

Before Ready resigned from Coppin State in August 2001, she had received a ringing endorsement from Mitchell, who had spoken to NBA Development League senior director Karl Hicks and Rob Levine. (now the G-League), From 2001 to 2003, she was an assistant coach for the now defunct Greenville Groove of the National Basketball Development League (now the G-league). She started as a Bobcats’ sideline reporter in 2004–05. In 2006 and 2007, Ready worked as a sideline reporter during the first and second rounds of the Women's Final Four of college basketball for ESPN2. Ready was also a part-time sideline reporter for TNT during the 2006 and 2007 NBA Playoffs, and the WNBA Playoffs on ESPN2 during 2006. After several years as the Hornets' sideline reporter and host on Fox Sports Carolinas, Ready was named an analyst on August 27, 2015, making her the first full-time female NBA game analyst. In 2018 she moved to Turner Sports.
