= Ros Gold-Onwude =

Nigerian-American sports broadcaster

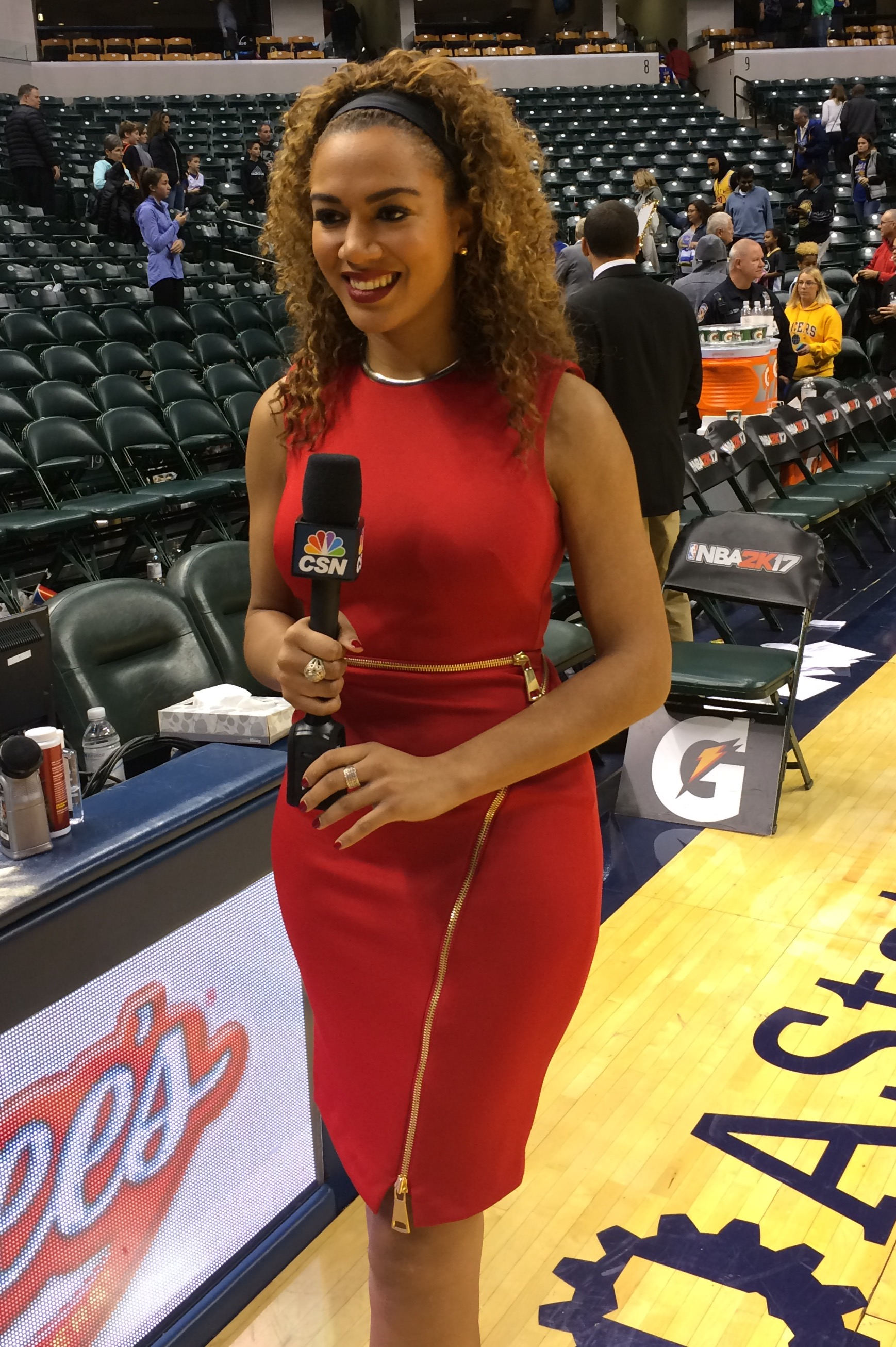
- Gold-Onwude at Gainbridge Fieldhouse in 2016

Personal information
- Born: April 28, 1987 (age 39) Queens, New York, U.S.
- Listed height: 5 ft 10 in (1.78 m)

Career information
- High school: Archbishop Molloy (Queens, New York)
- College: Stanford (2005–2010)
- Position: Point guard
Medals
Women's basketball
Representing Nigeria
African Games (All-Africa Games)
Bronze medal – third place	2011 Maputo	Team

Rosalyn Fatima Gold-Onwude (/ɒnˈwʊdi/; born April 28, 1987) is an American-Nigerian sports broadcaster. A native of New York City, Gold-Onwude played college basketball at Stanford and played on the Nigeria national team.

Gold-Onwude covers NBA basketball on ESPN's TV, digital, and radio platforms and has served as a fill-in host of First Take with Stephen A. Smith. Since 2012 Gold-Onwude has covered March Madness, the NCAA tournament and Pac-12 Men's and Women's college hoops in both the analyst and reporter role for Pac-12 Networks. Most recently Gold-Onwude has joined forces with Kevin Durant's and Rich Kleiman's 35 Ventures as one of the faces of "The Boardroom". Gold-Onwude was also the host of a sports debate show called "Don't at Me" presented by The Players' Tribune and streaming live on Twitter.

== Early life ==
Gold-Onwude was born in Queens, New York City, to Russian-Latvian-Polish-Jewish mother Pat Gold and Nigerian (of Igbo descent) father Austin Onwude. She grew up in Rego Park, Queens

She played high school basketball at Archbishop Molloy High School in Briarwood, New York. The team won two state titles in 2003 and 2004, but a knee injury finished her senior season early. Despite the injury, she graduated from Molloy as a highly decorated player and became the first female athlete in the program's history to play Division I basketball after accepting a scholarship to Stanford University. Gold-Onwude became Molloy's second all-time leading scorer and the all-time leader in steals and assists despite another knee injury. In 2011, Gold-Onwude became the first Molloy alumna to be inducted into the GCHSAA Hall of Fame.

== College career ==
Gold-Onwude played basketball while earning her bachelor's degree in communications and a master's degree in sociology at Stanford University.

As a member of the Stanford women's basketball team from 2005 to 2010, Gold-Onwude played in three Final Fours and two national championship games helping the Cardinal win four conference titles, as starting guard. In her final season she was named the 2010 Pac-10 Co-Defensive Player of the Year, ending her Stanford career as the school's all-time leader in games played.

== National team career ==
Gold-Onwude represented the Nigeria women's national team at the 2011 FIBA Africa Championship for Women where she averaged 8.1 points, 2.1 rebounds and 2 assists.

== Broadcasting ==
From 2017 to 2019, Gold-Onwude worked for Turner Sports in her first national role, covering the NBA regular season, playoffs, All Star Weekend and NBA Summer League games for TNT and NBATV. Before joining Turner Sports, Gold-Onwude served as the sideline reporter for the Golden State Warriors on NBC Sports Bay Area, covering the Warriors' run to three straight NBA Finals and two championships from 2014 to 2017. Gold-Onwude was the color commentator for the WNBA's New York Liberty from 2011 to 2017 for MSG Networks. Additionally, she joined NBC's coverage of the 2016 Rio Olympics as a sideline reporter for Men's Basketball. Gold-Onwude has worked as an analyst for the NBA on ESPN Radio since 2022. In 2023, during International Women's Day, she was a guest analyst for an NBA game on ESPN.

== Personal life ==
Gold-Onwude has spoken out about her passion for mentoring young girls, raising awareness for mental health issues and empowering women in business. She has participated in the NBA's Basketball Without Borders Program and NBA Africa Game. In December 2018 she returned to Nigeria to work with the Hope 4 Girls Camp, a girls only basketball camp.
