= Brooke Weisbrod =

American sportscaster

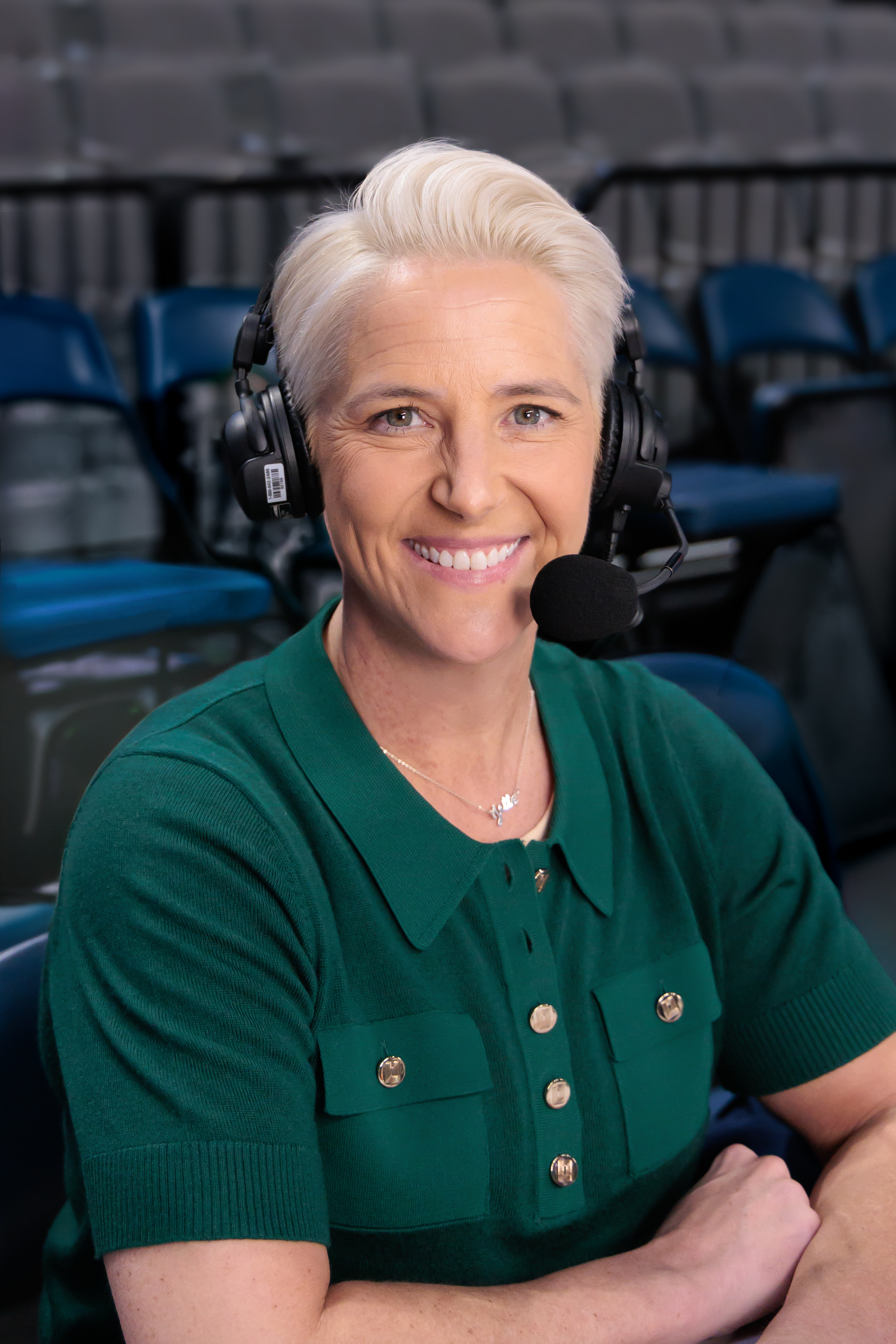
- Weisbrod in 2026

Personal information
- Born: September 24, 1979 (age 47) Cincinnati, Ohio
- Listed height: 5 ft 8 in (1.73 m)

Career information
- High school: Purcell Marian (Cincinnati, Ohio); St. Ursula Academy (Cincinnati, Ohio)
- College: Coastal Carolina (1997–2001)
- WNBA draft: 2001: undrafted
- Position: Guard

Career highlights
- Big South Player of the Year (2001); First-team All-Big South (2001); Big South Freshman of the Year (1998); Big South All-Freshman Team (1998)

Candace Brooke Weisbrod is an American sportscaster and college basketball analyst and reporter for ESPN.

== Early life ==
Weisbrod was born in Cincinnati, Ohio, where she attended Purcell Marian High School and St. Ursula Academy, and was a three-sport athlete at Coastal Carolina University (basketball, softball, and tennis). She was the second player in school history to amass at least 1,000 points, 300 rebounds and 200 assists. Her basketball awards include Big South Conference Rookie of the Year, Big South Conference Player of the Year, Big South Conference Scholar Athlete of the Year, NCAA Woman of the Year (South Carolina), and the Big South Conference All Decade Team. The Chanticleers played for an NCAA Tournament berth twice, losing to Liberty University in the Big South Conference Championship Game in 1999 and 2000. Weisbrod lettered in tennis and batted .256 with 4 HR's and 18 RBI's for the 1998 softball team that reached the NCAA Tournament. She graduated magna cum laude and was selected into the Wall School of Business Wall Fellows Program. In 2007, she was inducted into the university's Athletic Hall of Fame, and in 2013 she was the first female athlete to be named Chanticleer of the Year. Weisbrod briefly played professionally for Germany's Marburg Marlins until a back injury forced her to retire at 21.

=== Coastal Carolina statistics ===
Year	Team	Rebounds	Assists	Steals	Points
1997-98	Coastal Carolina	87	47	60	259
1998-99	Coastal Carolina	115	65	72	337
1999-00	Coastal Carolina	76	70	54	274
2000-01	Coastal Carolina	154	102	95	531
TOTALS		432	284	281	1401

== Broadcasting career ==
Weisbrod began her career in broadcasting with ESPN in 2004 as a women's college basketball analyst. While building a name for herself in broadcasting, she balanced a sales career in the advertising and metals industries for ten years. Now a full-time sports broadcaster, she covers college, high school, and professional basketball. On January 28, 2009, she called her first men's game, a then Big East matchup with West Virginia defeating St. John's 75–52 in Morgantown, West Virginia. She is now one of a few female analysts in the country who regularly calls men's college basketball games. Weisbrod was the analyst for the WNBA's Chicago Sky for the 2013 and 2014 seasons, and was named sideline reporter and co-host for MLS’s Chicago Fire in February 2014. On April 7, 2014, she joined WGN-FM's The Game as news update and on-air personality of the Kap and Haugh Show.

== Other ventures ==
Weisbrod created Skills and Score in 2017, a non-profit organization providing free sports and arts camps to Chicago Public School students. She also co-founded the Chi-Side, a sports media training program for basketball players ages 11–18. She travels to universities and events across the country as a speaker on the subjects of inspiration and motivation, women in sports, and media training. She has worked with the United Nations Foundation's Girl Up campaign and has also been a guest speaker for Nike, WNBA, and Dick's Sporting Goods, among others.

== Awards and honors ==
- 1998 Big South Conference Rookie of the Year
- 2001 Big South Conference Player of the Year
- 2001 Big South Conference Scholar Athlete of the Year
- 2001 NCAA Woman of the Year, South Carolina
- 2001 Wall Fellows Program
- 2007 Coastal Carolina University Hall of Fame
- 2013 Chanticleer of the Year
- 2014 Big South Conference All-Decade Team
- 2018 Big South Conference Hall of Fame
- 2021 WISE Woman of Inspiration
