= Monica McNutt =

ESPN basketball analyst and former collegiate basketball player

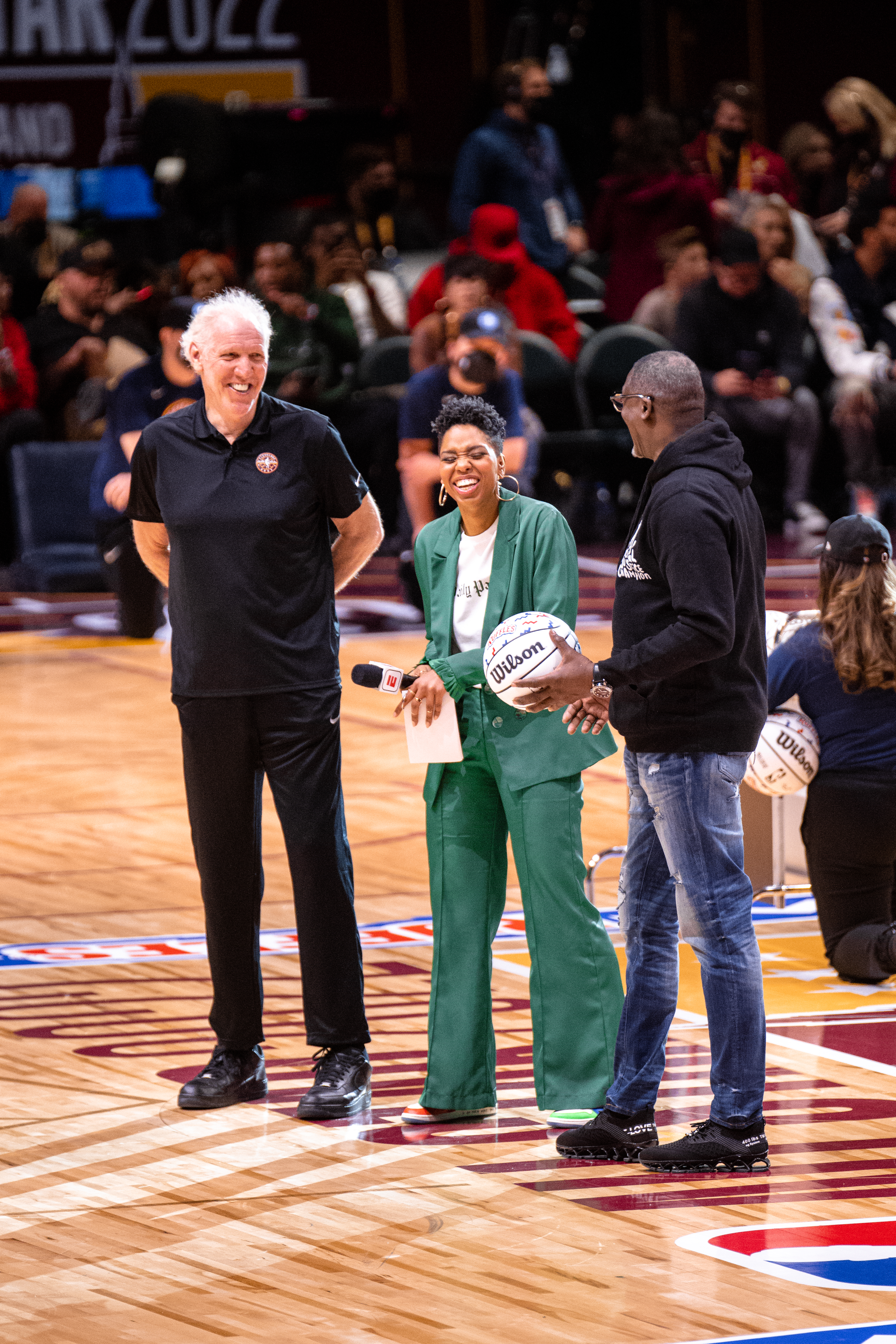
- McNutt (center) with Bill Walton and Dominique Wilkins
- Born: October 24, 1989 (age 36)
- Education: Georgetown University (BA); University of Maryland, College Park (MA)
- Occupation: Sports analyst

Monica McNutt (born October 24, 1989) is an American basketball analyst for ESPN and the MSG Network. She played college basketball for the Georgetown Hoyas.

== Early life and playing career ==
McNutt was born on October 24, 1989, and her hometown is Suitland, Maryland. She played high school basketball at the Academy of the Holy Cross in the Washington Catholic Athletic Conference, where she averaged less than 12 points per game but led the team in free throw percentage, field goal percentage and three-point field goal percentage. She was named the most valuable player of the Maryland Private School Tournament. At Georgetown she earned Second Team All-Big East Conference honors as a junior, when she averaged 11.2 points per game and led the team with 73 steals. She never made it to the WNBA.

=== Career statistics ===
Legend
GP	Games played	GS	Games started	MPG	Minutes per game
FG%	Field goal percentage	3P%	3-point field goal percentage	FT%	Free throw percentage
RPG	Rebounds per game	APG	Assists per game	SPG	Steals per game
BPG	Blocks per game	PPG	Points per game	**Bold**	Career high

Year	Team	GP	GS	MPG	FG%	3P%	FT%	RPG	APG	SPG	BPG	PPG
2007–08	Georgetown	29	–	16.5	**.409**	.316	.600	2.3	.4	.8	**.5**	5.6
2008–09	Georgetown	34	–	25.5	.404	.346	.794	3.9	.8	1.4	.4	8.0
2009–10	Georgetown	33	32	27.6	.389	**.353**	**.859**	3.8	**1.5**	**2.2**	.0	**11.2**
2010–11	Georgetown	**35**	**34**	**30.4**	.401	.341	.702	**4.3**	**1.5**	1.4	.2	10.5
**Career**		131	66	25.4	.399	.343	.765	3.6	1.1	1.5	.3	8.9
Statistics gathered from Sports-Reference.

== Broadcasting career ==
McNutt earned a master's degree in journalism from the University of Maryland, College Park, in 2013. Before obtaining her degree, she worked as a kindergarten aide. She was motivated to start her career in broadcasting after the school principal brought in a woman to speak at a professional development seminar. She said,

Something clicked for me as we were preparing and I remember telling my principal at the time, 'You know, I appreciate this opportunity so much, but this professional development day has reminded me that if you're going to be something in your field, you have to start.' Instead of operating on this borrowed time because it's convenient, I want to go and put my all efforts into moving into my field so that maybe one day, I would be leading my own professional development seminar in media.

McNutt began working at ESPN in 2019 as an ACC Network studio and game analyst, where her role slowly grew to include SportsCenter, WNBA coverage, and more. Prior to joining ESPN, McNutt worked at WJLA ABC7 in Washington, D.C., The American Sports Network, BeIN Sports and NBC Sports Washington. In addition to her ESPN duties, McNutt is a studio analyst for the New York Knicks and hosts MSG PM on MSG Networks. She has also appeared on Fox Sports 1, CBS Sports Network, Turner/NBA TV, and NBC's coverage of the Summer Olympics in 2021. She also cohosts the Jr. NBA Coaches Corner Podcast and the SALA Series Podcast.

== Volunteer work ==
McNutt works with Chiene Joy Jones, founder of Grow Our Game, a New York-based nonprofit organization that "helps young girls learn self-confidence, self-esteem, and more, all while learning basketball".

== Personal life ==
McNutt married Justin Jackson on August 17, 2024.
