= Lisa Malosky =

American sports reporter

Lisa Malosky is an American sports reporter based in Houston, Texas. Over her career, she has covered the Houston Rockets of the National Basketball Association (NBA), Houston Comets of the Women's National Basketball Association (WNBA), and the Houston Cougars men's basketball contests. She came to Houston in 1991 working for KPRC-TV. Since that time, she has also covered the NBA and WNBA for NBC, and TNT/WTBS.

Malosky also served as co-host for the syndicated television program American Gladiators from 1993 to 1995.

Malosky began her television career as a news reporter at WXOW-TV in La Crosse, Wisconsin.
