= List of NCAA Division I women's basketball tournament Final Four broadcasters =

In 1982, the first Division I NCAA women's basketball tournament was held. The NCAA was able to offer incentives, such as payment of transportation costs, to participating members, something the Association for Intercollegiate Athletics for Women was not able to do. When former AIAW powerhouses like Tennessee, Louisiana Tech, and Old Dominion decided to participate in the NCAA tournament, the AIAW tournament lost much of its appeal and popularity.

NBC canceled its TV contract with the association, and in mid-1982 the AIAW stopped operations in all sports. Following the last AIAW sanctioned event in 1982, the AIAW pursued a federal antitrust suit against the NCAA. But one year later, after the presiding judge ruled against the organization, the AIAW ceased existence on June 30, 1983.

Under NCAA governance, scholarships increased. However, several problems the NCAA was facing, then and now, began to also affect women's intercollegiate athletics. Examples of these include recruiting irregularities and increased turnover in coaching positions for revenue-producing sports.

Several AIAW championships were televised by the TVS Television Network in 1979.

== Television ==
Date	Network	Location	Play-by-play announcer	Color analyst(s)	Sideline reporter(s)	Rules analyst(s)	Studio host	Studio analyst(s)
1982	CBS (championship game)	Norfolk Scope (Norfolk, Virginia)	Frank Glieber	Cathy Rush				
1983	CBS (championship game)	Norfolk Scope (Norfolk, Virginia)	Frank Glieber	Ann Meyers				
1984	CBS (championship game)	Pauley Pavilion (Los Angeles, California)	Frank Glieber	Ann Meyers				
1985	CBS (championship game); ESPN (national semifinals)	Frank Erwin Center (Austin, Texas)	Frank Glieber; Jim Thacker	Pat Summitt; Mimi Griffin				
1986	CBS (championship game); ESPN (national semifinals)	Rupp Arena (Lexington, Kentucky)	Gary Bender; Leandra Reilly	Mimi Griffin				
1987	CBS (championship game); ESPN (national semifinals)	Frank Erwin Center (Austin, Texas)	Tim Brant; Leandra Reilly	Mimi Griffin; Cheryl Miller				
1988	CBS (championship game); ESPN (national semifinals)	Tacoma Dome (Tacoma, Washington)	Tim Brant; Roger Twibell	Mimi Griffin; Cheryl Miller				
1989	CBS (championship game); ESPN (national semifinals)	Tacoma Dome (Tacoma, Washington)	Tim Brant; Steve Physioc	Mimi Griffin; Cheryl Miller				
1990	CBS (championship game); ESPN (national semifinals)	Thompson–Boling Arena (Knoxville, Tennessee)	Tim Brant; Bob Rathbun	Mimi Griffin	Andrea Joyce		Andrea Joyce	
1991	CBS	Lakefront Arena (New Orleans, Louisiana)	Brad Nessler	Mimi Griffin	Andrea Joyce and Mary Carillo			
1992	CBS	Los Angeles Memorial Sports Arena (Los Angeles, California)	Brad Nessler	Ann Meyers			Andrea Joyce	
1993	CBS	The Omni (Atlanta, Georgia)	Tim Ryan	Ann Meyers	Andrea Joyce and Mary Carillo			
1994	CBS	Richmond Coliseum (Richmond, Virginia)	Tim Ryan	Ann Meyers			Andrea Joyce	
1995	CBS	Target Center (Minneapolis, Minnesota)	Sean McDonough	Ann Meyers	Dan Bonner		Andrea Joyce	Sheryl Swoopes
1996	ESPN	Charlotte Coliseum (Charlotte, North Carolina)	Mike Patrick	Ann Meyers			Robin Roberts	Mimi Griffin
1997	ESPN	Riverfront Coliseum (Cincinnati, Ohio)	Mike Patrick	Ann Meyers			Robin Roberts	Mimi Griffin and Rebecca Lobo
1998	ESPN	Kemper Arena (Kansas City, Missouri)	Mike Patrick	Ann Meyers			Robin Roberts	Mimi Griffin and Rebecca Lobo
1999	ESPN	San Jose Arena (San Jose, California)	Mike Patrick	Ann Meyers	Pam Ward and Jennifer Azzi		Robin Roberts	Mimi Griffin and Rebecca Lobo
2000	ESPN	First Union Center (Philadelphia, Pennsylvania)	Mike Patrick	Ann Meyers	Michele Tafoya and Vera Jones-Soleyna		Robin Roberts	Jay Bilas and Vera Jones-Soleyna
2001	ESPN	Savvis Center (St. Louis, Missouri)	Mike Patrick	Ann Meyers	Michele Tafoya and Pam Ward		Robin Roberts	Nell Fortner and Vera Jones
2002	ESPN	Alamodome (San Antonio, Texas)	Mike Patrick	Ann Meyers			Robin Roberts	Nell Fortner and Vera Jones
2003	ESPN	Georgia Dome (Atlanta, Georgia)	Mike Patrick	Ann Meyers	Doris Burke and Pam Ward		Rece Davis	Nell Fortner and Stacey Dales
2004	ESPN	New Orleans Arena (New Orleans, Louisiana)	Mike Patrick	Ann Meyers	Doris Burke		Rece Davis	Nell Fortner and Stacey Dales
2005	ESPN	RCA Dome (Indianapolis, Indiana)	Mike Patrick	Ann Meyers	Doris Burke and Mark Jones		Rece Davis	Stacey Dales and Lisa Leslie
2006	ESPN	TD Garden (Boston, Massachusetts)	Mike Patrick	Doris Burke	Holly Rowe and Mark Jones		Trey Wingo	Kara Lawson and Stacey Dales
2007	ESPN	Quicken Loans Arena (Cleveland, Ohio)	Mike Patrick	Doris Burke	Holly Rowe and Mark Jones		Trey Wingo	Kara Lawson and Stacey Dales
2008	ESPN	St. Pete Times Forum (Tampa, Florida)	Mike Patrick	Doris Burke	Holly Rowe and Rebecca Lobo		Trey Wingo	Kara Lawson and Stacey Dales
2009	ESPN	Scottrade Center (St. Louis, Missouri)	Mike Patrick	Doris Burke	Holly Rowe and Rebecca Lobo		Trey Wingo	Kara Lawson and Carolyn Peck
2010	ESPN	Alamodome (San Antonio, Texas)	Dave O'Brien	Doris Burke	Holly Rowe and Rebecca Lobo		Trey Wingo	Kara Lawson and Carolyn Peck
2011	ESPN	Bankers Life Fieldhouse (Indianapolis, Indiana)	Dave O'Brien	Doris Burke	Holly Rowe and Rebecca Lobo		Trey Wingo	Kara Lawson and Carolyn Peck
2012	ESPN	Pepsi Center (Denver, Colorado)	Dave O'Brien	Doris Burke	Holly Rowe and Rebecca Lobo		Trey Wingo	Kara Lawson and Carolyn Peck
2013	ESPN	New Orleans Arena (New Orleans, Louisiana)	Dave O'Brien	Doris Burke	Holly Rowe and Rebecca Lobo		Kevin Negandhi	Kara Lawson and Carolyn Peck
2014	ESPN	Bridgestone Arena (Nashville, Tennessee)	Dave O'Brien	Doris Burke	Holly Rowe		Kevin Negandhi	Kara Lawson and Rebecca Lobo
2015	ESPN	Amalie Arena (Tampa, Florida)	Dave O'Brien	Doris Burke	Holly Rowe		Kevin Negandhi	Kara Lawson and Rebecca Lobo
2016	ESPN	Bankers Life Fieldhouse (Indianapolis, Indiana)	Beth Mowins	Doris Burke	Holly Rowe		Kevin Negandhi	Kara Lawson and Rebecca Lobo
2017	ESPN	American Airlines Center (Dallas, Texas)	Dave O'Brien	Doris Burke and Kara Lawson	Holly Rowe		Maria Taylor	Rebecca Lobo and Andy Landers
2018	ESPN	Nationwide Arena (Columbus, Ohio)	Adam Amin	Kara Lawson and Rebecca Lobo	Holly Rowe		Maria Taylor	Rebecca Lobo, Nell Fortner and Andy Landers
2019	ESPN	Amalie Arena (Tampa, Florida)	Adam Amin	Kara Lawson and Rebecca Lobo	Holly Rowe		Maria Taylor	Rebecca Lobo, Nell Fortner and Andy Landers
2020	Not held because of the COVID-19 pandemic							
2021	ESPN	Alamodome (San Antonio, Texas)	Ryan Ruocco	Rebecca Lobo	Holly Rowe and LaChina Robinson		Maria Taylor	Andy Landers and Carolyn Peck
2022	ESPN	Target Center (Minneapolis, Minnesota)	Ryan Ruocco	Rebecca Lobo	Holly Rowe and Andraya Carter		Elle Duncan	Rebecca Lobo, Nikki Fargas and Carolyn Peck
2023	ABC (championship game); ESPN (national semifinals)	American Airlines Center (Dallas, Texas)	Ryan Ruocco	Rebecca Lobo	Holly Rowe and Andraya Carter		Elle Duncan	Rebecca Lobo, Monica McNutt, Carolyn Peck and Andraya Carter
2024	ABC (championship game); ESPN (national semifinals)	Rocket Mortgage FieldHouse (Cleveland, Ohio)	Ryan Ruocco	Rebecca Lobo	Holly Rowe	Lisa Mattingly and Denny Meyer	Elle Duncan	Andraya Carter, Chiney Ogwumike, Carolyn Peck and Aliyah Boston
2025	ABC (championship game); ESPN (national semifinals)	Amalie Arena (Tampa, Florida)	Ryan Ruocco	Rebecca Lobo	Holly Rowe	Violet Palmer	Elle Duncan	Andraya Carter and Chiney Ogwumike
2026	ABC (championship game); ESPN (national semifinals)	Mortgage Matchup Center (Phoenix, Arizona)	Ryan Ruocco	Rebecca Lobo	Holly Rowe	Dee Kantner	Christine Williamson	Andraya Carter and Chiney Ogwumike

=== Notes ===
- There was no TV coverage of the national semifinals prior to 1985.
- All 63 games were broadcast on television from 2003 to 2019 on ESPN and ESPN2 with added coverage on ESPNU and ESPN3 since 2006. Local teams are shown on each channel when available, with "whip-around" coverage during the first and second rounds designed to showcase the most competitive contests in the rest of the country. All regional semifinals, regional finals and Final Four games were televised nationally in exclusive windows.
- In 2021 ESPN3 coverage was dropped (except for streaming of ABC games). Instead all 63 games were shown nationally in exclusive windows on ESPN, ESPN2, ESPNU, ESPNews, and ABC.
- Beginning in 2022 the tournament expanded to 67 games with all being shown nationally in exclusive windows on ESPN, ESPN2, ESPNU, ESPNews, and ABC.

== Radio ==
Date	Network	Location	Play-by-play announcer	Color analyst(s)	Sideline reporter(s)	Studio host
2006	Westwood One	TD Banknorth Garden (Boston)	Beth Mowins	Debbie Antonelli	Krista Blunk	Brad Sham
2007	Westwood One	Quicken Loans Arena (Cleveland, Ohio)	Beth Mowins	Debbie Antonelli	Krista Blunk	Joe Tolleson
2008	Westwood One	St. Pete Times Forum (St. Petersburg, Florida)	Beth Mowins	Debbie Antonelli	Krista Blunk	Joe Tolleson
2009	Westwood One	Scottrade Center (St. Louis, Missouri)	Beth Mowins	Debbie Antonelli	Krista Blunk	Joe Tolleson
2010	Westwood One	Alamodome (San Antonio, Texas)	Beth Mowins	Debbie Antonelli	Krista Blunk	Joe Tolleson
2011	Westwood One	Conseco Fieldhouse (Indianapolis, Indiana)	Beth Mowins	Debbie Antonelli	Krista Blunk	Joe Tolleson
2012	Dial Global	Pepsi Center (Denver, Colorado)	Dave Ryan	Debbie Antonelli	Krista Blunk	Joe Tolleson
2013	Dial Global	New Orleans Arena (New Orleans, Louisiana)	Dave Ryan	Debbie Antonelli	Krista Blunk	Joe Tolleson
2014	Westwood One	Bridgestone Arena (Nashville, Tennessee)	Dave Ryan	Debbie Antonelli	Krista Blunk	Joe Tolleson
2015	Westwood One	Amalie Arena (Tampa, Florida)	John Sadak	Debbie Antonelli	Krista Blunk	Lance Medow
2016	Westwood One	Bankers Life Fieldhouse (Indianapolis, Indiana)	John Sadak	Debbie Antonelli	Krista Blunk	Lance Medow
2017	Westwood One	American Airlines Center (Dallas, Texas)	John Sadak	Debbie Antonelli	Krista Blunk	Lance Medow
2018	Westwood One	Nationwide Arena (Columbus, Ohio)	John Sadak	Debbie Antonelli	Krista Blunk	Lance Medow
2019	Westwood One	Amalie Arena (Tampa, Florida)	John Sadak	Debbie Antonelli	Krista Blunk	Lance Medow
2020	Not held because of the COVID-19 pandemic					
2021	Westwood One	Alamodome (San Antonio, Texas)	Ryan Radtke	Debbie Antonelli	Krista Blunk	Lance Medow
2022	Westwood One	Target Center (Minneapolis, Minnesota)	Ryan Radtke	Debbie Antonelli	Krista Blunk	Lance Medow
2023	Westwood One	American Airlines Center (Dallas, Texas)	Ryan Radtke	Debbie Antonelli	Krista Blunk	Lance Medow
2024	Westwood One	Rocket Mortgage FieldHouse (Cleveland, Ohio)	Ryan Radtke	Debbie Antonelli	Ros Gold-Onwude	Lance Medow
2025	Westwood One	Amalie Arena (Tampa, Florida)	Ryan Radtke	Debbie Antonelli	Ros Gold-Onwude	J.B. Long
2026	Westwood One	Mortgage Matchup Center (Phoenix, Arizona)	Ryan Radtke	Debbie Antonelli	Ros Gold-Onwude	J.B. Long
