= WNBA on CBS =

- Also known as: WNBA on CBS Sports
- Genre: WNBA basketball telecasts
- Theme music composer: Emily Bjorke
- Opening theme: "Queen of the Court"
- Country of origin: United States
- Original language: English
- No. of seasons: 8+

Production
- Producers: Deb Boulac; Jason Ross; Bill Thayer
- Camera setup: Multi-camera
- Running time: 120 minutes+
- Production company: CBS Sports

Original release
- Network: CBS; CBS Sports Network (2019–2025); Paramount+
- Release: May 25, 2019 – present

Related
- NBA on CBS

The WNBA on CBS isis a presentation of the Women's National Basketball Association (WNBA) produced by CBS Sports. As of the 2026 WNBA season. the package consists of 20 games per-season televised by CBS and streamed by Paramount+.

== History ==
On April 22, 2019, CBS Sports announced a "multi-year" agreement with the WNBA beginning in the 2019 season, under which it would televise around 40 regular season games on CBS Sports Network. The games would primarily air in primetime and on weekends, and were simulcast from the regional clean feeds provided by WNBA League Pass.

In the 2021 season, CBS Sports renewed the contract, maintaining the 40-game package, and allowing up to three games to air on the CBS broadcast network and Paramount+ (with the remaining games aired by CBSSN).

In the 2024 season, CBS renewed its contract through 2026, covering 20 games per-season on CBS and CBS Sports Network. The agreement saw an expansion of CBS's involvement, with the network now airing eight games per-season, and these games becoming in-house CBS Sports productions. During the 2025 WNBA season, CBS broadcast two games in primetime, both of which between the Chicago Sky and Indiana Fever; these marked the first non-exhibition regular-season WNBA games to air in primetime on a "Big Four" network.

CBS Sports renewed its rights as part of a new multi-year deal beginning in the 2026 WNBA season, with all 20 games now airing on CBS.

== Commentators ==
=== Current ===
==== Play-by-play ====
- Jordan Kent
- Chris Lewis
- Ed Cohen
- Jack Gordon

==== Color analysts ====
- Isis Young
- Debbie Antonelli
- Julianne Viani Braen
- Stephanie Ready

==== Sideline reporter ====
- Tiffany Blackmon
- AJ Ross
- Chris Williamson
- Hailey Sutton

=== Former ===
==== Play-by-play ====
- Anne Marie Anderson
- Jon Bloom
- Krista Blunk
- Pat Boylan
- John Brickley
- Cindy Brunson
- Lisa Byington
- Andy Demetra
- Paul Dottino
- Dick Fain
- Marney Gellner
- Brendan Glasheen
- Michael Grady
- Angel Gray
- Tiffany Greene
- Rahshaun Haylock
- Bob Heussler
- Alan Horton
- Tom Leander
- Sloane Martin
- Meghan McPeak
- Jeff Munn
- Jason Ross Jr.
- Sean Salisbury
- Matt Schumacker
- Chris Shearn
- Zora Stephenson
- Ron Thulin

==== Color analysts ====
- Kim Adams
- Debbie Antonelli
- Stephen Bardo
- Ashley Battle
- Tully Bevilaqua
- Rushia Brown
- Allie Clifton
- Jordan Cornette
- Ros Gold-Onwude
- Bria Goss
- Sarah Kustok
- Lisa Leslie
- Nancy Lieberman
- Meghan McKeown
- Ann Meyers Drysdale
- Mary Murphy
- Lea B. Olsen
- Raegan Pebley
- Carolyn Peck
- LaChina Robinson
- Leah Secondo
- Sheryl Swoopes
- Mike Trudell
- Charli Turner Thorne
- Tabitha Turner
- Julianne Viani
- Scott Williams
- Christy Winters-Scott
- Elise Woodward

==== Sideline reporters ====
- Patricia Babcock-McGraw
- Robyn Brown
- Tina Cervasio
- Katie Engleson
- Terrika Foster-Brasby
- Maggie Hale
- ShaVonne Herndon
- Kelsie Kasper
- Nikki Kay
- Kristen Lago
- Meg McDonald
- Dan Nolan
- Piper Shaw
- Mike Trudell
- Kirsten Watson

== Viewership ==
The two games on CBS on June 19 and June 26, 2021 averaged about 427,000 and 567,000 viewers respectively.

For 2024, CBS Sports enjoyed its most watched regular season ever for the WNBA. CBS Sports average 1.10 million viewers. That's up by 86% from the previous year.

The most watched game in WNBA on CBS history is the June 16, 2024 contest between the Chicago Sky and Indiana Fever, which averaged 2.25 million viewers.

== See also ==
- Women's National Basketball Association - Media coverage
- Sports broadcasting contracts in the United States

Preceded by None	WNBA network broadcast partner 2020–present with ABC (2020–present) with NBC (2026–future)	Succeeded by Incumbent
Preceded by None	WNBA pay television carrier 2019–2025 with ESPN (2019–2025) with Prime Video (2021–2025)	Succeeded by USA/Peacock
