= NBA on CBS =

NBA basketball broadcast telecasts (1973–1990)

- 1983–1989 title card
- Genre: American basketball game telecasts
- Directed by: Sandy Grossman; Mike Arnold; Larry Cavolina; Robert A. Fishman
- Presented by: Various commentators
- Country of origin: United States
- Original language: English
- No. of seasons: 17

Production
- Executive producer: Ted Shaker
- Producers: Michael Burks; Bob Dekas; Bob Mansbach; Robert D. Stenner; Charles H. Milton III
- Production locations: Various NBA arenas (game telecasts)
- Cinematography: Carmen Abhold; Scott Carlson; Al Cialino; Terry Clark; Keith Dabney; Dan Flaherty; Mike Glenn; George Graffeo; Mike Harvey; Tim Maher; Michael Marks; Tom McCarthy; Jeffrey Pollack; George Rothweiler; Paul T. Sherwood; Fred Shimizu
- Camera setup: Multi-camera
- Running time: 210 minutes or until game ends (inc. adverts)
- Production company: CBS Sports

Original release
- Network: CBS
- Release: October 20, 1973 – June 14, 1990

Related
- WNBA on CBS; NBA on TNT; NBA on TBS

The NBA on CBS is an American presentation of National Basketball Association (NBA) games produced by CBS Sports, and televised on the CBS television network. It aired from October 20, 1973 to June 14, 1990.

== History ==
=== Early presentation ===
In the early 1970s, the CBS television network aired American Basketball Association (ABA) games, specifically league's annual All-Star Game/selected playoff games. Pat Summerall served as the CBS analyst on some ABA games alongside Don Criqui on play-by-play. Game 5 of the 1970 ABA Finals (Indiana vs. Los Angeles) was nationally televised by CBS on Saturday, May 23 at 3 p.m. Eastern Time. The broadcast was, however, blacked out in Indiana. After that league's 1972–73 season, CBS lost its television airing rights as they started airing NBA games in its 1973–74 season onward.

During CBS' first few years of covering the NBA, CBS was accused of mishandling their NBA telecasts. Among the criticisms included CBS playing too much loud music, the lack of stability with the announcers, regionalizing telecasts (thus fragmenting the ratings even further), billing games as being between star players instead of teams, and devoting too much attention to the slam dunk in instant replays. Regular features included a pre-game show that consisted of mini-teams of celebrities, and active and former NBA players competing against each other, and a halftime show called Horse.

The NBA eventually took notice of the criticisms and managed to persuade CBS to eliminate its original halftime show. In its place, came human-interest shows about the players (similar to the ones seen on the network's NFL pre-game The NFL Today). There also was a possibility that CBS would start televising a single national game on Sunday afternoons.

Other adjustments that CBS made in hopes of improving its coverage included hiring reporter Sonny Hill to cover the league on a full-time basis. CBS also put microphones and cameras on team huddles to allow viewers to see and hear coaches at work. Finally, CBS introduced a halftime segment called Red Auerbach on Roundball, featuring the Hall of Fame Boston Celtics coach. The segment intended to not only educate CBS' viewers about the complexities of the pro game but also to teach young players how to improve their skills. They also subtly introduced audiences to an all-star team based on Auerbach's criteria such as screening and passing. In a Red on Roundball halftime segment that appeared on CBS' NBA telecasts in the 1973–74 season, Auerbach and referee Mendy Rudolph discussed and demonstrated the practice of flopping with obvious disapproval.

Sandy Grossman was the chief director of broadcasting NBA games on CBS during the early 1970s. Grossmann innovated using music at the break of basketball games, and after he played "The Hustle" by Van McCoy, McCoy sent him a gold record in thanks of his promotion.

ABC meanwhile, filled the void left by losing the NBA by counterprogramming Wide World of Sports on Sundays against CBS' NBA coverage.

Pat Summerall worked the Masters for CBS during the April 13–14 weekend in 1974. In the 1974-75 season CBS covered 43 games including all 4 games of the NBA Finals.

In the 1975–76 season, CBS had asked the NBA to schedule both games on January 25, so they could choose which one to televise.

==== Slam dunk contest ====
During the 1976–77 season, the NBA's first after the ABA–NBA merger brought four American Basketball Association teams into the league, CBS held a slam dunk contest that ran during halftime of the Game of the Week telecasts. Don Criqui was the host of this particular competition. The final, which pitted Larry McNeill of the Golden State Warriors against eventual winner Darnell "Dr. Dunk" Hillman of the Indiana Pacers, took place during Game 6 of the 1977 NBA Finals. At the time of the final, Hillman's rights had been traded to the New York Nets, but he had not yet signed a contract. Since he was not officially a member of any NBA team, instead of wearing a jersey, he competed in a plain white tank top. Then for the post-competition interview, Hillman donned a shirt with the words "Bottle Shoppe" – the name of an Indianapolis liquor store, which is still in existence, and was the sponsor of a city parks softball league team for which Hillman played left field (and the only team he was a member of at the time). Other players to compete in the slam dunk tournament included Julius Erving, George Gervin, Kareem Abdul-Jabbar and Moses Malone. CBS, anxious for star power, also gave David Thompson the opportunity to be eliminated three times.

==== H-O-R-S-E Competition ====
During the 1977–78 season, CBS held a H-O-R-S-E competition at halftime of the Game of the Week telecasts. Again, Don Criqui hosted with Mendy Rudolph officiating. 32 players, including Rick Barry, Pete Maravich, George Gervin, Jo Jo White, Doug Collins, Paul Westphal and Bob McAdoo, competed in a round-robin single-elimination tournament each week. Barry was eliminated in the first round by Earl Tatum of the Los Angeles Lakers. Maravich and Westphal made it to the final, which was scheduled to take place at halftime of Game 2 of the 1978 NBA Finals. However, Maravich was injured and unavailable, so CBS instead had Westphal shoot a free-throw against "Bag-Man" (who was Rick Barry, who was on the announcing team, wearing a paper sack over his head). Westphal, with a bag over his head as well, made the free throw while Barry missed, and CBS awarded him the trophy.

=== Tape delay and playoff scheduling ===
From 1975 to 1979, CBS aired all NBA Finals games live (usually during the afternoon); live NBA Finals game coverage on the network resumed in 1982. During this era, CBS aired weeknight playoff games from earlier rounds on tape delay at 11:30 p.m. Eastern Time (airing games live when the game site was in the Pacific Time Zone). CBS continued this practice until at least the mid-1980s.

CBS did not want sportscasters to give the final score on the late-evening newscasts aired by its local affiliates. The network preferred the games to not be over by that time if they were going to be aired on tape later that night. Most CBS games were either 8:30 or 9 p.m. local starts. For instance, CBS aired Games 1–3 of the 1981 Western Conference finals, between the Houston Rockets and Kansas City Kings. Ironically, both Western Conference teams finished the regular season with a record 40–42, instead of the Eastern Conference finals between the Boston Celtics and Philadelphia 76ers (both teams finished with a 62–20 record).

1986 was the last year that CBS aired an NBA playoff game on tape delay. The network's final delayed playoff broadcast was Game 3 (on May 16) of the Western Conference finals between the Los Angeles Lakers and Houston Rockets. The game aired at 11:30 p.m. Eastern Time after having a 9:30 p.m. tip.

=== Preemptions ===
Due to the NBA's lack of widespread popularity nationwide in the 1970s and early 1980s, the network tinkered with the league's schedule. However, individual CBS affiliates did as much tinkering, with many outright refusing to air NBA programming during much of CBS' partnership with the league.

WCPO-TV in Cincinnati, a CBS affiliate during the NBA on CBS era, did not carry many regular season games in the 1970s, deciding to run movies and other programming instead. The city had lost the Cincinnati Royals (now the Sacramento Kings) when they moved to Kansas City and Omaha in 1972; Cincinnati has not had an NBA team since. And during the 1980s, CBS' coverage of Sunday NBA games on Sunday were frequently pre-empted by the network's affiliates in both North Carolina and South Carolina, a region that included WBTV in Charlotte. Ironically, toward the end of the NBA's partnership with CBS, the Charlotte Hornets would make their debut in 1988-89, citing the sport's popularity in the Carolinas as a reason for expansion.

==== Scheduling history overview ====
CBS scheduling tote boards
Game	Day	Date	Status
1979 NBA Final
1	Sunday	May 20	Live
2	Thursday	May 24	Tape delay
3	Sunday	May 27	Live
4	Tuesday	May 29	Live to Eastern/Central zones, tape delay to Mountain/Pacific zones (11:30 p.m. Eastern Time start)
5	Friday	June 1	Live (9 p.m. Eastern Time start)
1980 Eastern Conference Final
1	Friday	April 18	No broadcast
2	Sunday	April 20	Live
3	Wednesday	April 23	No broadcast
4	Thursday	April 24	No broadcast
5	Sunday	April 27	Live
1980 Western Conference Final
1	Tuesday	April 22	No broadcast
2	Wednesday	April 23	Live to Eastern/Central zones, tape delay elsewhere
3	Friday	April 25	Live to Eastern/Central zones, tape delay elsewhere
4	Sunday	April 27	Live
5	Wednesday	April 30	Live to Eastern/Central zones, tape delay elsewhere
1980 NBA Final
1	Sunday	May 4	Live
2	Wednesday	May 7	Live to Eastern/Central zones, tape delay elsewhere
3	Saturday	May 10	Live
4	Sunday	May 11	Live
5	Wednesday	May 14	Live to Eastern/Central zones, tape delay elsewhere
6	Friday	May 16	Affiliates had choice to show live or tape delay

===== 1976 =====
The 1976 NBA Finals had three straight off days between the Sunday afternoon opener and Game 2 the following Thursday night due to CBS' concern with low ratings for professional basketball. The 1975–76 network television season (as well as May sweeps) ended after Wednesday, May 26 (with weekend afternoon games not factored into the prime-time ratings). Accordingly, CBS allowed Game 1 to be played on Sunday afternoon since the ratings would not count, but would not permit Game 2 to be played live in prime time unless the NBA waited until Thursday evening.

For Game 3 of the Finals, CBS forced the NBA to start the game in Phoenix at 10:30 a.m. local time (1:30 p.m. Eastern Time) on a Sunday morning. This was done to accommodate a golf telecast that afternoon. Many local clergymen were outraged, as attendance at Sunday church services was drastically reduced that day.

===== 1977 =====
By 1977, CBS' NBA schedule was composed of six regionalized telecasts on Sundays. Not only that, the network would air one national game if they felt that the match-up itself warranted national coverage. CBS also could stage doubleheaders and switch from a one-sided game to a close one. During this period, the network stopped airing any games during prime time before the NBA Finals. Instead, CBS started airing several West Coast games at 11:30 p.m. Eastern Time.

For most of the early years, the NBA tried to assist CBS by allowing the network to choose any game it wanted to broadcast. But too often, these involved smaller-market teams (such as the Portland Trail Blazers) that were in the playoffs or had won the championship.

CBS wanted the NBA to start Game 6 of the Finals at 10:30 local time on Sunday morning to accommodate a golf telecast of the Kemper Open (similar to 1976). This time, the NBA refused and CBS agreed to a noon start in Portland. Even though this was the Finals' clinching game, CBS cut away from its NBA coverage very quickly after the game ended, skipping the trophy presentation in the Trail Blazers' locker room to instead televise the golf tournament.

===== 1978 =====
By 1978, NBC aired Saturday afternoon college basketball games, while CBS aired NBA doubleheaders on Sunday afternoons, and most independent stations aired local professional and college games. CBS started to fear that their ratings suffered as a result of too many basketball games being aired on television at once. As an experiment of sorts, the network decided to air the first two games of the Conference finals at 11:30 p.m. Eastern Standard Time.

===== 1979 =====
In 1979, Games 2 and 5 of the Eastern Conference finals were televised live, while Game 7 was broadcast on tape delay. Games 3 and 6 of the Western Conference finals aired live, while Games 2, 5, and 7 were televised via tape delay. Games 6 and 7 of the 1979 NBA Finals would have been televised live (at 3:30 p.m. on a Sunday and then 9 p.m. on the following Tuesday), but were unnecessary. However, Game 2 of the Finals was aired on tape delay while CBS affiliates in the DC area and the Pacific Northwest telecast the game live.

===== 1980 =====
By the 1979–1980 season, the network's NBA ratings had bottomed, with a regular season rating for the broadcasts at 6.4. By this time, the network had eliminated its regional coverage and only used two play-by-play announcers (Brent Musburger and Gary Bender) and three color commentators (Bill Russell and Rod Hundley, who teamed with Musburger and Rick Barry, who teamed with Bender); CBS felt that showing an NBA Finals game was not worth pre-empting their Friday night lineup (the smash hit Dallas in particular) during May sweeps (although the iconic episode in which J.R. Ewing was shot aired on March 21, 1980, and Dallas was already in summer reruns). The consensus was that a basketball game in prime time would have drawn fewer viewers. As a result, CBS used to regularly run NBA games in the 11:30 p.m. time slot (then occupied by The CBS Late Movie). For the 1980 and 1981 NBA Finals, CBS scheduled Games 3 and 4 on back-to-back days (Saturday and Sunday) to avoid an extra tape delay game.

When it came time for CBS to broadcast Game 6 of the 1980 Finals (on Friday, May 16), the network gave its affiliates the option of either airing the game live or on tape delay (in fact, WAGA-TV in Atlanta [home of the Hawks, and now a Fox owned-and-operated station] did not carry the NBA on CBS for numerous year and this game was no exception; ironically, thanks to an independent station picking it up, Atlanta was the only market outside of Philadelphia in the Eastern, Central and Mountain time zones to air it live). If the affiliate chose to air the game later that night, then the prime schedule would consist of reruns of The Incredible Hulk, The Dukes of Hazzard and Dallas (CBS, NBC and ABC ended the 1979–80 seasons in late March and early April in anticipation of a strike by the Screen Actors Guild, which came to fruition in July 1980). The clinching Game 6 of the 1980 Finals between the Los Angeles Lakers and Philadelphia 76ers was, most notably, aired live in the Philadelphia, Los Angeles, Portland, Seattle and San Francisco markets; CBS stations in the latter three markets were able to air the game live and still show most of the CBS prime schedule since the game tipped at 6 p.m. Pacific Time. Otherwise, most CBS affiliates chose to air Game 6 on tape delay.

The reason for this scheduling dilemma was the fact that the NBA had opted to start the regular season earlier. Starting in the mid-1970s, the NBA had pushed back the start of the regular season, resulting in it ending increasingly later (for example, April 6 in 1975, April 11 in 1976). Before that, the regular season had always ended in late March. For the 1979–1980 and 1980–1981 seasons, the NBA reverted to the earlier practice, with the season ending respectively on March 30, 1980, and March 29, 1981 (both falling on a Sunday). That meant that the Finals in those years began in the first week of May rather than the end of May, and as a result, the weeknight games were played during May ratings sweeps. Consequently, weeknight games held on the West Coast started at 8:30 p.m. Pacific Time, which was 11:30 p.m. in the Eastern Time Zone; those games could be shown live. However, non-West Coast weeknight games required tape-delay, to be shown at 11:30 p.m.

===== 1981 =====
The 1980–1981 season was arguably the rock bottom point of the tape delay era for CBS. CBS aired four of the six Finals games on tape delay and six of nine during the Conference finals. Just like the previous year, CBS scheduled Games 3 and 4 of the NBA Finals without an off-day to avoid yet another tape-delayed game. CBS wanted the Pacific teams to advance in the playoffs so that they could show live games at 11:30 p.m. on the Eastern U.S.; however, the Los Angeles Lakers and Portland Trail Blazers were upset in Round 1, while the Phoenix Suns were upset in Round 2. This left two teams located in the Central Time Zone, the Houston Rockets and Kansas City Kings (both with 40–42 regular season records), to play in the Western Conference finals.

===== Later years =====
The NBA responded to CBS' actions by returning to a schedule that started later – usually the last weekend in October – and ended in mid-to-late-April, resulting in the NBA Finals ending after sweeps. In the 1979–1980 and 1980–1981 seasons, the NBA had experimented with ending the regular season at the end of March, thereby ensuring that the Finals were played in early to mid May; starting with the 1981–1982 season, a late April regular-season finale was held, resulting in the finals starting in late May and stretching into June (for example, while the 1980 Finals were slated for May 4 to 18 if they went seven games, and the 1981 Finals for May 5–17, the 1982 Finals were scheduled for May 27 to June 10).

While CBS would stop tape delaying its game broadcasts after the 1981 NBA Finals, many first-round playoff games were not nationally televised (and would not become so until 1995). During this era, CBS typically provided regional coverage of two games in a late Sunday afternoon time slot during the first three weekends of the playoffs. In 1986, CBS provided regional coverage of the Eastern Conference Finals and Western Conference finals games on May 18. This would be the last time that any NBA Conference finals game was not nationally televised.

During the 1980s, CBS showed a mixture of NBA and college basketball games during the regular season. Each March, CBS would essentially suspend its NBA coverage during the NCAA men's basketball tournament. CBS typically showed a few regular season NBA games in the weeks after the NFL season ended, before March Madness and several weekends leading into the playoffs.

====== 1981–82 ======
CBS would reserve a playoff game with an early start (such as Game 6 of the Eastern Conference finals) for tape delay, preventing USA Network from televising it live.

The 1982 Finals marked the first time since 1978 that all of the games aired live in their entirety; As a compromise between CBS and the NBA, the season returned to late October after starting it in early October the previous two seasons, meaning that the championship series started after the conclusion of May sweeps. Also, Brent Musburger served as anchor for Game 1 in Philadelphia, but had to anchor Games 2 and 5 from New York, because he hosted CBS Sports Sunday. So anchoring the coverage in Musburger's absence were Frank Glieber (Games 2–4) and Pat O'Brien (Game 5).

====== 1982–83 ======
In the 1982–83 season, CBS significantly reduced the number of regular season broadcasts from 18 to four. The rationale was that cable television networks (namely, the USA Network and ESPN) were carrying a large number of regular season games (at least 40 each). In return, CBS executives believed that the public was being oversaturated with NBA coverage.

CBS added two broadcasts in November near the end of the 1982 National Football League players' strike. The 57-day walkout ended on November 16, and games resumed five days later.

====== 1983–84 ======
For the 1983–84 season, CBS would televise just ten (out of 170 nationally) regular season games. Meanwhile, CBS televised about 16 playoff games. 1984 featured an increase to 47 nationally televised playoff time slots (43 national games plus 8 regional games in four windows).

====== 1984–85 ======
On May 12, 1985, during halftime of the Boston Celtics–Philadelphia 76ers playoff game, CBS televised the first NBA draft lottery.

====== 1985–86 ======
1986 was the last time CBS aired an NBA playoff game on tape delay, Game 3 of the Western Conference finals between the Los Angeles Lakers and Houston Rockets, which was held on May 16 of that year. The game aired at 11:30 p.m. Eastern Time following a 9:30 p.m. tip. Also in 1986, CBS provided regional coverage of the Eastern Conference and Western Conference finals games on May 18. As previously mentioned, this was the last time that any NBA Conference finals game was not nationally televised.

As was the case in 1985, Game 1 of the 1986 NBA Finals was on Memorial Day afternoon. Game 3 of the NBA Finals in Houston was played during the midst of an electrical storm that knocked the picture out for approximately the first six minutes of the fourth quarter. Although the video was already on the fritz towards the end of the third, CBS announcer Dick Stockton waited for nearly three minutes before adjusting to a radio play-by-play.

====== 1986–87 ======
In 1987, CBS provided prime-time coverage for Game 6 of the Eastern Conference finals, marking the network's first pre-Finals prime-time playoff telecast since 1975. CBS was able to do this because the NBA decided to push the Finals back from late May until early June. With the Finals starting a week later, the awkward long pauses between Games 1 and 2 were no longer required. Because of this, instead of Game 2 of the Finals being shown on the first night after the sweeps ended, CBS could show Game 6 of the conference finals.

Also in 1987, the NBA Finals hit a then-record rating of 15.9. James Brown was the sideline reporter for Games 3 and 4 (the latter being the Magic junior skyhook game) of the Finals because Pat O'Brien attended the birth of his son, Sean Patrick. O'Brien called Games 1, 2, 5, and 6.

====== 1988–89 ======
By the late 1980s, CBS was telecasting 15 or 16 regular season games per year. In 1989 alone, only 13 of the 24 playoff games (Games 1–3, specifically) in Round 1 aired on TBS or CBS (for example, none of the four games from the Seattle–Houston first-round series appeared on national television). Notably, Game 5 of the 1989 playoff series between the Chicago Bulls and Cleveland Cavaliers (featuring Michael Jordan's now famous game-winning, last-second shot over Craig Ehlo) was not nationally televised. The CBS-affiliated stations in Virginia (WTKR in Norfolk, WTVR-TV in Richmond and WDBJ in Roanoke) elected to show the first game of a second round series between Seattle and the Lakers.

Meanwhile, many CBS affiliates on the West Coast (such as KCBS-TV in Los Angeles and KPIX-TV in San Francisco) were able to broadcast at least a portion of the Chicago-Cleveland game. In Los Angeles, the hometown Lakers finished their game (started at the same time as the Chicago-Cleveland game) just in time for CBS to switch to the Chicago-Cleveland game, where, as it happened, Jordan made his game-winner. The Portland Oregonian criticized CBS for its decision to show Game 1 of the second round Seattle-Lakers series in Portland on KOIN rather than that game. Furthermore, CBS only broadcast the fifth game of the first-round series between Atlanta and Milwaukee nationally. The nationally televised Atlanta-Milwaukee game aired at 1 p.m. Eastern Time, while the regionally televised Chicago-Cleveland and Seattle/L.A. Lakers games aired at 3:30 p.m. Eastern Time.

Perhaps even more confusing, both Game 5 sites (Coliseum at Richfield in Cleveland and Omni Coliseum in Atlanta) were in the Eastern Time Zone, so differing local start times were not a factor. Previously, CBS aired Game 2 of the Chicago-Cleveland series nationally, while relegating Game 2 of the Atlanta-Milwaukee series to TBS. CBS used its primary announcing team, Dick Stockton and Hubie Brown to call the latter game.

=== Resurgence of the NBA ===
Popular belief holds that the peak era of the NBA on CBS occurred from 1984 to 1987. During this period, CBS' NBA coverage was the beneficiary of a new era in the league that would forever link two of the game's greatest players, Larry Bird and Magic Johnson. Bird and Johnson entered the NBA (coming off playing against each other in the highest-rated NCAA Men's Division I Basketball Championship of all time), respectively playing for the Boston Celtics and Los Angeles Lakers. The Lakers and Celtics, two iconic teams in large television markets, rose to prominence during the period; many credit the theatrics of Bird and Johnson with boosting the overall popularity of the NBA (especially during the tape delay era of NBA telecasts). Within three years of Johnson and Bird entering the league, the NBA had a Game of the Week on CBS, and ratings for Finals games approached levels rivaling those of the World Series.

Before the Bird/Magic era, CBS used to televise approximately five to seven games regionally per week in a doubleheader format (1:45 and 4 p.m. Eastern Time) on Sundays. Ratings for regional were far outdrawn by NBC's college basketball coverage and ABC's Superstars program. After ratings bottomed out in 1980 and 1981, coinciding with CBS airing tape-delayed coverage, the network decided to scrap the regional telecasts. In its place, CBS sold the marquee players and teams (for example, "Julius Erving and the Philadelphia 76ers", "Larry Bird and the Boston Celtics" or "Magic Johnson and the Los Angeles Lakers") for a "Game of the Week" broadcast.

=== Memorable moments ===
During its tenure as the NBA's broadcast network partner, CBS aired notable Finals series between the Los Angeles Lakers and Boston Celtics, as well as both championships won by the "Bad Boy"-era Detroit Pistons.

=== Ratings ===
In 1976, CBS' regular season ratings earned an abysmal (by the standards of the time) 26 share on Sunday afternoons. In 1978, the deciding game of the NBA Finals ranked 442nd out of 730 shows from September 1, 1977, to August 31, 1978. The next highest-rated playoff game in prime time only ranked 619th.

CBS' NBA ratings were also extremely low during the early part of the 1980s. In 1980, the 26 share from 1976 had fallen to 18%. Ratings fell to a level where, as mentioned before, CBS began airing games on tape delay. The 1981 NBA Finals set the standard for futility, with an average rating of 6.7, the lowest in NBA history until the 2003 NBA Finals averaged a 6.5 on ABC.

With the rebirth of the Lakers–Celtics rivalry, ratings improved, especially in the three NBA Finals that the two teams played in. Between 1981 and 1983, ratings for CBS' NBA telecasts rose by 12%. CBS' highest-rated NBA game (and the only NBA game that scored more than 20 rating points for the network) was Game 7 of the 1988 NBA Finals between the Lakers and the Detroit Pistons. By the end of its coverage, CBS' NBA ratings had been mostly respectable, with the lowest-rated Final after 1982 scoring 12.3 (three times), a mark higher than any NBA Final since 1998.

=== The end of The NBA on CBS ===
On November 9, 1989, the NBA and NBC reached an agreement on a four-year, US$600 million contract (beginning in the 1990–91 season).

The NBA's popularity was skyrocketing by the late 1980s and Commissioner David Stern wanted more exposure. This meant that he wanted more than 15 games a year shown on network television. However, CBS didn't have the room to broadcast double and triple headers every Sunday like NBC could because of their NFL and college basketball coverage. Additionally, CBS had recently signed deals with Major League Baseball and the Winter Olympics, making it even more difficult to accommodate the NBA's request for more over the air telecasts. All in all, CBS was pretty much destined to cut ties with the NBA by 1990.

From 1986 to its final year in 1990, CBS paid about US$47 million per year for the NBA broadcast contract. The final NBA game that CBS televised to date was Game 5 of the NBA Finals between the Detroit Pistons and Portland Trail Blazers on June 14, 1990. The Pistons won 92–90 to clinch their second consecutive NBA Championship.

As the soundtrack for their goodbye montage, CBS used "The Last Waltz" by The Band and Marvin Gaye's rendition of "The Star-Spangled Banner" from the 1983 NBA All-Star Game, ending CBS Sports' relationship with the NBA after 17 years.

CBS broadcast all five NBA Finals involving Larry Bird, all four NBA Finals involving Julius Erving, nine of the ten involving Kareem Abdul-Jabbar (the 1971 NBA Finals were on ABC), and eight of the nine NBA Finals involving Magic Johnson (the following year's Finals were Johnson's last, Michael Jordan's first, and the first to be broadcast by NBC).

Before the closing montage, CBS's final NBA game broadcast ended with this sign-off by Dick Stockton:

Well, I guess now the time has come. This is our last game as many of you may know. And it's really the end of a 17-year love affair between CBS and the NBA. For every member of our broadcast team and I mean technicians, and cameramen, production people, the terrifically talented folks in the truck, where it all happens, and of course...the commentators, this has been an extraordinary experience. We've witnessed the careers of Julius Erving, and Larry Bird, and Magic Johnson. We've seen Michael Jordan take flight. All the players actually...fired the imagination not only for an entire generation of NBA fans but for all of us at CBS. We know we leave the NBA in good hands. But to Isiah and Hakeem and Patrick and David Robinson, to all the players, coaches...and you the viewers, we're going to miss all of you. So long!

==== Future ====
In May 2007, the NBA renewed its television contract with ESPN, making ABC the broadcast television home of the NBA through 2016. On October 6, 2014, ESPN and the NBA renewed their agreement through 2025. CBS has implied that it is unlikely to bid on further sports rights beyond those it already holds, including the NBA, because of the extensive investment it has made into its existing sports portfolio (especially college basketball).

On August 30, 2012, the CBS Sports Network signed a deal with the NBA Development League to televise 12 regular games, as well as the 2013 NBA D-League Playoffs and Finals. On April 22, 2019, CBS Sports Network signed a deal with the Women's National Basketball Association (WNBA) to televise 40 regular season games.

== Announcers ==
=== Brent Musburger ===
Musburger was involved in every NBA Finals (either as a play-by-play announcer or as a host) from 1975 to 1989 (with 1981 being the lone exception), and was the lead voice for NBA games on CBS for much of that period. From 1975 to 1980, Musburger worked with a variety of analysts for regular season games (including Billy Cunningham, Mendy Rudolph, Hot Rod Hundley, Oscar Robertson, Steve Jones, Tom Heinsohn and Rick Barry). Musburger called Game 5 of the 1976 NBA Finals, with Rick Barry and sideline reporters Mendy Rudolph and Sonny Hill. After 1980, Musburger became the lead studio host and secondary play-by-play announcer. With the latter role, Musburger worked alongside Kevin Loughery (1983–1984), Hubie Brown (1985), Billy Cunningham (1986–1987), Tom Heinsohn (1988) and Bill Raftery (1989), and called the other conference final not assigned to Dick Stockton's team on CBS from 1983 to 1989. Musburger was fired from CBS following the 1990 NCAA Division I Men's Basketball Championship Game, a few months before its contract with the NBA ended. However, he later resumed calling NBA games on ESPN Radio and later with ESPN through 2006.

=== Dick Stockton ===
Dick Stockton was the lead voice of The NBA on CBS from 1981 to 1990. After CBS failed in an attempt to compete with NBC's college basketball announcing team of Dick Enberg, Billy Packer and Al McGuire with Gary Bender (who was subsequently "promoted" to a play-by-play position on CBS' newly acquired college basketball package), Rick Barry and Bill Russell, Stockton became the voice of the NBA. Working with Tom Heinsohn (who was criticized by the media and viewers for being too biased to the Boston Celtics, a team he once played for and later coached) from 1983 to 1987, Stockton called some of the most memorable NBA Finals in league history. In 1984, 1985 and 1987, the Los Angeles Lakers and Boston Celtics played each other in the NBA Finals, and Stockton's broadcasts became the highest rated in NBA history at that time.

Stockton would call the NBA Finals through the rest of the 1980s and in 1990 as well, working the 1988 NBA Finals with Billy Cunningham and the 1989 and 1990 NBA Finals with Hubie Brown (after Cunningham left CBS Sports to accept a management job with the new Miami Heat). After CBS' run with the NBA ended, Brown moved to Turner Sports to fill the same role. Stockton would not call another NBA game until 1995, when he also joined Turner. Stockton and Brown would occasionally be paired together on TBS and TNT until 2002, when Brown was hired to coach the Memphis Grizzlies. Stockton continued to call NBA games with Turner until 2012.

=== Other personalities ===
CBS employed many NBA greats during its 17 years as the lead network carrier; Bill Russell was an analyst for several years, mainly in the 1970s and early 1980s. Elgin Baylor was an analyst during CBS' inaugural year in 1973–1974, and was fired during that year's playoffs due to what CBS considered a lackluster performance. He was replaced by another NBA great, Rick Barry, who held a fairly consistent role with CBS through the 1970s and early 1980s, including calling several NBA Finals. Steve "Snapper" Jones, best known from the NBA on NBC, was part of CBS' broadcast teams, partnering with Don Criqui in 1975–1976 and 1976–1977.

During Game 5 of the 1981 NBA Finals, CBS posted an old photo of Bill Russell, who was on the announcing team with Gary Bender and Rick Barry, on the 1956 Olympic team. Bender asked Barry, "Who do you think that is in the picture?" Barry answered:

I don't know, it looks like some fool with that big watermelon grin back there!

Some considered Barry's comments to be racially insensitive. Barry was adamant that they were taken out of context, but CBS did not renew his contract for the subsequent season. Russell stayed on with new play-by-play announcer Dick Stockton for two seasons before giving way to former Celtics teammate Tom Heinsohn for the 1983–84 season.

CBS often used the same analysts for both the NBA playoffs and NCAA Men's Division I Basketball Championship. Tom Heinsohn, Billy Cunningham, and Hubie Brown all worked NCAA Regional rounds during years when they also served as the lead NBA analyst for CBS. Billy Packer worked NBA playoff games in 1987 and 1988, while he was CBS' lead college basketball analyst.

As previously mentioned, during the 1984 NBA Finals, Lesley Visser (then wife of lead NBA on CBS play-by-play announcer Dick Stockton) became the first woman to cover an NBA Finals. She joined CBS Sports part-time in 1984 before joining full-time in 1987. When she was part-time with CBS, she still worked for the Boston Globe, as she had many diverse assignments with the newspaper. Visser became the first female NBA beat writer in 1976, when she was assigned to cover the Boston Celtics. Visser resigned from the Globe in late 1988.

While Brent Musburger did host most of CBS' NBA Finals pregame and halftime programs, Pat O'Brien hosted a pregame show during the earlier rounds of the playoffs called The Basketball Show. O'Brien, working with analyst Bill Raftery, also hosted the Prudential At The Half. When Musburger left CBS Sports in April 1990, O'Brien took over the NBA Finals (the last that CBS did) hosting duties full-time. In 1988 and 1989, Pat O'Brien filled-in for Brent Musburger (who was busy covering the College World Series for CBS) as the NBA Finals anchor for Game 2.

=== List of broadcasters ===
- Hubie Brown
- James Brown
- Quinn Buckner
- Charlsie Cantey
- Jane Chastain
- Doug Collins
- Bob Costas
- Don Criqui
- Irv Cross
- Billy Cunningham
- Terry Dischinger
- Eddie Doucette
- Len Elmore
- Keith Erickson
- Frank Glieber
- Jim Gray
- Jerry Gross
- Greg Gumbel
- John Havlicek
- Tom Heinsohn
- Sonny Hill
- Rod Hundley
- Steve "Snapper" Jones
- Andrea Joyce
- Sonny Jurgensen
- Jim Karvellas
- Jim Kelly
- Stu Lantz
- Kevin Loughery
- Verne Lundquist
- Pete Maravich
- Jon McGlocklin
- Dick Motta
- Jeff Mullins
- Brent Musburger
- Andy Musser
- Jim Nantz
- Pat O'Brien
- Billy Packer
- Mike Patrick
- Bill Raftery
- Cal Ramsey
- Oscar Robertson
- Mendy Rudolph
- Bill Russell
- Cazzie Russell
- Tim Ryan
- Lynn Shackelford
- Jimmy "The Greek" Snyder
- Larry Steele
- Dick Stockton
- Pat Summerall
- Lesley Visser
- Jerry West
- Jack Whitaker
- Lenny Wilkens

=== Announcing teams ===
==== 1980–1981 ====
1. Gary Bender, Bill Russell and Rick Barry
2. Dick Stockton and Kevin Loughery
3. Frank Glieber and Dick Motta
4. Rick Barry and Rod Hundley

==== 1981–1982 ====
1. Dick Stockton and Bill Russell
2. Frank Glieber and Hubie Brown
3. Jim Kelly and Doug Collins
4. Eddie Doucette and Kevin Loughery

==== 1982–1983 ====
1. Dick Stockton and Bill Russell
2. Brent Musburger and Kevin Loughery
3. Frank Glieber and Doug Collins
4. Jim Kelly and Bill Raftery

==== 1983–1984 ====
1. Dick Stockton and Tom Heinsohn
2. Brent Musburger and Kevin Loughery
3. Gary Bender and Doug Collins
4. Frank Glieber and James Brown

==== 1984–1985 ====
1. Dick Stockton and Tom Heinsohn
2. Brent Musburger and Hubie Brown
3. Gary Bender and Doug Collins
4. Frank Glieber and James Brown

==== 1985–1986 ====
1. Dick Stockton and Tom Heinsohn
2. Brent Musburger and Billy Cunningham
3. Gary Bender and Hubie Brown
4. Jim Nantz/Mike Patrick and Doug Collins

Jim Nantz called three games for CBS, all regional telecasts.

==== 1986–1987 ====
1. Dick Stockton and Tom Heinsohn
2. Brent Musburger and Billy Cunningham
3. Verne Lundquist and Hubie Brown
4. Tim Brant and Billy Packer

==== 1987–1988 ====
1. Dick Stockton and Billy Cunningham
2. Brent Musburger and Tom Heinsohn
3. Verne Lundquist and Hubie Brown
4. Tim Brant and Billy Packer

==== 1988–1989 ====
1. Dick Stockton and Hubie Brown
2. Brent Musburger and Bill Raftery
3. Verne Lundquist and Tom Heinsohn
4. Greg Gumbel and Quinn Buckner

==== 1989–1990 ====
1. Dick Stockton and Hubie Brown
2. Verne Lundquist and Len Elmore
3. James Brown and Tom Heinsohn
4. Greg Gumbel and Quinn Buckner

CBS NBA Final announcers
Year	Play-by-Play	Color
1990	Dick Stockton	Hubie Brown
1989	Dick Stockton	Hubie Brown
1988	Dick Stockton	Billy Cunningham
1987	Dick Stockton	Tom Heinsohn
1986	Dick Stockton	Tom Heinsohn
1985	Dick Stockton	Tom Heinsohn
1984	Dick Stockton	Tom Heinsohn
1983	Dick Stockton	Bill Russell
1982	Dick Stockton	Bill Russell
1981	Gary Bender	Bill Russell and Rick Barry
1980	Brent Musburger	Rod Hundley and Bill Russell
1979	Brent Musburger	Rick Barry and Rod Hundley
1978	Brent Musburger	Rick Barry and John Havlicek
1977	Brent Musburger	Rick Barry and Steve Jones
1976	Brent Musburger	Mendy Rudolph and Rick Barry
1975	Brent Musburger	Oscar Robertson
1974	Pat Summerall	Rick Barry and Rod Hundley

=== Christmas Day broadcasters ===
CBS broadcast a Christmas Day game each year from 1975 to 1989 with the exception of 1982.

Year	Teams	Play-by-play	Color commentator(s)
1975	Kansas City at Phoenix	Don Criqui	Mendy Rudolph
1976	Chicago at Kansas City	Don Criqui	Billy Cunningham
1977	Washington at Philadelphia	Don Criqui	Steve Jones
1978	Philadelphia at New York	Brent Musburger	Keith Erickson
1979	Philadelphia at Washington	Gary Bender	Rod Hundley
1980	Boston vs. New York	Gary Bender	Bill Russell and Rick Barry
1981	Los Angeles Lakers at Phoenix	Dick Stockton	Bill Russell
1983	New Jersey vs. New York	Dick Stockton	Tom Heinsohn
1984	Philadelphia at Detroit	Dick Stockton	Tom Heinsohn
1985	Boston vs. New York	Dick Stockton	Tom Heinsohn
1986	Chicago vs. New York	Dick Stockton	Tom Heinsohn
1987	Detroit at New York	Dick Stockton	Billy Cunningham
1988	Los Angeles Lakers at Utah	Dick Stockton	Hubie Brown
1989	Cleveland at Atlanta	Dick Stockton	Hubie Brown

== Theme music ==
Through the 1973–74 to 1975–76 seasons, as well as for most of the 1978–79 season, the theme music for The NBA on CBS incorporated lyrics; "Last Night" by The Mar-Keys was used roughly around 1975–76 as the play-by-play announcer would give a preview to the featured game.

Starting in 1977, CBS used an alternate opening showing a montage of still pictures of current NBA star athletes with music (similar to the music used by the network for its NFL coverage at that time) accompanying it. In 1980, CBS used rotoscoped animation in silhouette of one player shooting a jumpshot and the ball in mid-air rolling all the NBA teams as it spun in the air, set to disco–pop–moog music. During the 1978–79 season, the music for the highlights was "Chase", composed by Giorgio Moroder as the theme for the movie Midnight Express. The opening guitar and horn riff of the Chicago hit "Alive Again" were used for the highlights prior to the opening animation during the 1979–80 and 1980–81 seasons.

By the 1983 NBA Finals, the opening sequence was set in a primitive computer-generated montage of basketball action inside a virtual arena that was similar in resemblance to the Boston Garden. This opening sequence (which was usually intertwined by a montage of live basketball action complete with narration) was created by Bill Feigenbaum, who also created a similar open for The NFL Today used around the same time. This opening melody (mostly consisting of an uptempo series of four notes and three bars each) from 1983 to 1988 was composed by Allyson Bellink and is generally considered to be the most familiar theme music that The NBA on CBS used.

For the 1989 NBA Finals, CBS completely revamped the opening montage. The computer-generated imagery (once again set in and around a virtual arena) was made to look more realistic (live-action footage was incorporated in the backdrops). Also, the familiar theme music was rearranged to sound more intricate and to have a more emotional impact, along the lines of the network's later World Series coverage. Between the 1989 NBA Finals and the 1990 NBA Finals' intros, the theme music was slightly revised; the 1989 Finals intro incorporated more of a guitar riff, while the 1990 Finals intro featured a little more usage of trumpets.

== On-screen graphics ==
During the late 1980s, the time and score graphic appeared at the bottom of the screen after each score for only a few seconds, and when the shot clock was running down CBS provided a small blue graphic in the left portion of the screen that showed the clock running out. Also, when the game clock ran inside of two minutes, CBS would display the clock in the lower right-hand portion of the screen.

== Miscellaneous coverage ==
=== CBS Radio's coverage ===
From roughly the 1963–64 through the 1965–66 seasons, the CBS Radio Network broadcast NBA games with commentators Jerry Gross and Jack Buck.

=== WNBA on CBS ===
On April 22, 2019, CBS Sports Network and the WNBA struck a deal to televise 40 games in primetime and on weekends during the 2019 season. The games broadcast on CBS from local broadcasts already airing on the WNBA's streaming site, WNBA League Pass.

On June 19, 2021, CBS broadcast a WNBA game between the Connecticut Sun and Chicago Sky with Lisa Byington providing the play-by-play and Lisa Leslie providing analysis. On June 26, 2021, CBS broadcast a game between the Washington Mystics and Dallas Wings. The two games on CBS on June 19 and 26 averaged about 427,000 and 567,000 viewers respectively.

Initially, most games were broadcast via clean feeds provided by the league and the home team's regional broadcaster. Beginning in the 2024 season, the games carried on the CBS network are now produced in-house by CBS Sports, with the clean feed productions now used solely for games on CBS Sports Network.

== Statistics ==
Games televised / television contracts per season (CBS)
Season	1973–74	1974–75	1975–76	1976–77	1977–78	1978–79	1979–80	1980–81	1981–82	1982–83	1983–84	1984–85	1985–86	1986–87	1987–88	1988–89	1989–90
Games	40	37	40	40	40	38	36	40	40	26	32	32	33	38	42	36	45
Contracts	$27 million/3 years			$21 million/2 years		$74 million/4 years				$91.9 million/4 years				$173 million/4 years

Records
Preceded by ABC	NBA network broadcast partner 1973–1990	Succeeded by NBC
