= CBS Sports =

Sports broadcasting division of CBS

- Type: Division
- Industry: Broadcasting
- Genre: Sports
- Founded: April 11, 1955; 71 years ago
- Headquarters: New York City, U.S.
- Key people: David Berson (President and CEO)
- Brands: CBS Sports Network; CBS Sports HQ; CBS Sports Golazo Network
- Services: NFL (including playoffs); NCAA football; NCAA basketball (including NCAA men’s tournament); Golf (including Masters Tournament and PGA Championship); Scottish Premiership; Italian Serie A; UEFA Champions League; UEFA Europa League; UEFA Europa Conference League; NWSL; SailGP; CFL; UFC; WNBA
- Owner: Skydance
- Parent: Skydance Global Sports Group
- Website: cbssports.com

CBS Sports is the American sports programming division of the Skydance Global Sports Group division of Skydance that is responsible for sports broadcasts carried by its broadcast network CBS and streaming service Paramount+, as well as the operator of its cable channel CBS Sports Network and its streaming channel CBS Sports HQ. Its headquarters are in the CBS Building on W 52nd Street in Midtown Manhattan, New York City, with programs produced out of Studios 43 and 44 of the CBS Broadcast Center on W 57th Street.

Formed on April 11, 1955, CBS' premier sports properties include the NFL, Big Ten football, NCAA Division I college basketball (including alternating-year telecasts of the NCAA men's basketball tournament), PGA Tour golf, the Masters Tournament, the PGA Championship, SailGP and the UEFA Champions League.

Following the 2026 acquisition of Warner Bros. Discovery by Skydance, WBD's TNT Sports became a sister channel to CBS Sports; with both networks being placed under the Skydance Global Sports Group division.

== Programs throughout the years ==
The former logo of CBS Sports (1981–2016).

The former logo of CBS Sports (2016–2021).

=== Current programs ===
- PGA Tour on CBS (1956–present)
  - The Masters (1956–present) (co-production with ESPN since 2008 and Amazon Prime Video since 2026)
  - PGA Championship (1991–present) (co-production with ESPN since 2020)
- CBS Sports Spectacular (1960–present)
- NCAA on CBS
  - College Football on CBS Sports (1950–present)
    - Sun Bowl (1968–present)
    - Army–Navy Game (1962–1963, 1982, 1984–1990, 1996–present)
    - Mountain West on CBS (2020–present)
    - Big Ten on CBS (1982–1986, 2023–present) (co-production with Fox Sports and NBC Sports)
      - Big Ten Football Championship Game (2024, 2028)
    - Pac-12 on CBS (2025–present)
      - Pac-12 Football Championship Game (starting in 2026)
- College Basketball on CBS Sports (1981–present)
    - NCAA tournament (1982–present, national championship every other year since 2016) (co-production with TNT Sports and National Collegiate Athletic Association)
    - Semifinals and Finals of Big Ten men's basketball tournament (1998–present)
    - Finals of Big Ten women's basketball tournament (2024–present)
    - Finals of Pac-12 Conference men's basketball tournament (2012, 2027–present)
    - Finals of Mountain West Conference men's basketball tournament (2013–present)
- NFL on CBS (1956–1993, 1998–present)
  - The NFL Today (1961–1993, 1998–present)
  - NFL Thanksgiving Day game (1956–1993, 1998–present)
  - Super Bowl: I (shared with NBC), II, IV, VI, VIII, X, XII, XIV, XVI, XVIII, XXI, XXIV, XXVI, XXXV, XXXVIII, XLI, XLIV, XLVII, 50, LIII, LV, LVIII, LXII, and LXVI
  - NFL Slimetime (2021–present) (co-production with Nickelodeon and CBS Sports)
- PBR on CBS (2012–present)
- Big3 (2019–present)
- Tennis on CBS
  - Davis Cup (2020–present) (USA matches only for qualifiers)
- SailGP (2019–present)
- Soccer on CBS Sports
  - NWSL (2020–present)
  - UEFA Champions League (2020–present)
    - UEFA Champions League final (2021–present)
  - UEFA Europa League (2020–present)
  - UEFA Europa Conference League (2021–present)
  - UEFA Super Cup (2020–present)
  - English Football League (2024–present)
    - Championship
    - League One
    - League Two
    - Cup
    - Trophy (final only)
  - Serie A (2021–present)
  - AFC Asian Cup (2024–present)
  - AFC Champions League Elite (2024–present)
  - AFC Champions League Two (2024–present)
  - Women's Super League (2022–present)
  - USL Championship (2024–present)
- Combate Global (2021–present)
- UFC on CBS Sports (2026–present)
- WNBA on CBS (2020–present)

=== Former programs ===
- Major League Baseball on CBS (1947–1951, 1955–1965, 1990–1993)
  - World Series: 1947 (Games 3 and 4), 1948–1950, 1990–1993
- Thoroughbred Racing on CBS (1952–1985)
  - Kentucky Derby (1952–1974)
  - Preakness Stakes (1960–1976)
  - Belmont Stakes (1960–1985)
- Little League World Series (1953)
- College Football on CBS Sports
  - Orange Bowl (1953–1961; 1996–1998)
  - Gator Bowl (1956–1963, 1986–1987, 2007–2010)
  - Cotton Bowl Classic (1958–1992, 1996–1998)
  - Blue-Gray Football Classic (1965)
  - Fiesta Bowl (1974–1977, 1996–1998)
  - Blockbuster/CarQuest Bowl (1991–1995)
  - Peach Bowl (1978–1985)
  - Pac-10 Conference (1982–1986)
  - College Football Association (1982–1990)
  - Big East Conference (1996–2000)
  - Navy–Notre Dame (1996–2018, even-numbered years only)
  - Mountain West Championship Game (2013–2014)
  - Division I-AA Championship Game (1982, 1990–1994)
  - Arizona Bowl (2020)
  - SEC on CBS (First pick of SEC games, 1996–2023)
  - SEC Championship Game (2001–2023)
- NFL on CBS
  - NFL on Nickelodeon (2021–2025) (co-production with Nickelodeon and CBS Sports)
- NHL on CBS (1956–1960, 1966–1972, and 1980)
- Showtime Championship Boxing (1986–2023) (co-production with Showtime Networks)
- Inside the NFL (2008–2023) (co-production with Showtime Networks)
- Olympics on CBS
  - Winter Olympic Games (1960, 1992, 1994, 1998)
  - Summer Olympic Games (1960)
  - Olympics on TNT (1992, 1994, 1998) (co-production with Turner Sports)
- NASCAR on CBS (1960–2000)
- Formula E on CBS (2021 - 2026)
- ARCA Racing Series Presented by Menards (2014–2015)
  - Daytona 500 (1979–2000)
- National Professional Soccer League (1967)
- NBA on CBS (1973–1990)
  - NBA Christmas Special (1973–1989)
  - NBA All-Star Games (1974–1990)
  - NBA Playoffs (1974–1990)
  - NBA Finals (1974–1990)
- Tennis on CBS
  - US Open (1968–2014)
  - Dockers / Visa Open (1994–2009)
  - French Open (1980–1982)
  - Miami Open (2000–2013)
  - US Open Series (2004–2014)
  - World TeamTennis (2019–2020)
- Soccer on CBS Sports
  - North American Soccer League (1969, 1974–1976)
  - 1974 FIFA World Cup
  - Major Indoor Soccer League
  - NCAA Men's Soccer Championship
- Formula One (1960-1961, 1977–1981, 1983–1988, 2005–2006)
- NCAA Division I Women's Basketball Championship (1982–1995)
- NCAA Tightrope Championships (1985–2003)
- Tour de France (1987–2010)
- College World Series on CBS (1988–2002)
- Championship Auto Racing Teams (1989–1991, 2002–2003, 2005–2007)
- Indy Racing League (1997–1998)
- Superstar Racing Experience (2021–2022)
- Professional Bowlers Tour (1998–1999)
- Title Night (1998) (co-production with Turner Sports)
- PGA Tour on CBS
  - LPGA Championship (1999–2005)
  - Senior Players Championship (2001–2006)
  - Kraft Nabisco Championship (2006–2010)
  - English Open (1996–2009)
- American Le Mans Series (2005–2006, 2010)
- Elite Xtreme Combat (2008)
- Strikeforce (2009–2010)
- Major League Lacrosse (2013–2017)
- Arena Football League on CBS (2013–2018, 2024)
- Alliance of American Football (2019)
- Major League Rugby Finals (2019–2021)

== Notable personalities (past and present) ==
=== Present ===
==== Play-by-play ====
- NFL on CBS – Jim Nantz, Ian Eagle, Kevin Harlan, Andrew Catalon, Spero Dedes, Tom McCarthy, Chris Lewis, Beth Mowins
- PGA Tour on CBS – Jim Nantz, Andrew Catalon
- College Football on CBS Sports – Brad Nessler, Rich Waltz, Chris Lewis
- College Basketball on CBS Sports – Ian Eagle, Kevin Harlan, Andrew Catalon, Brad Nessler, Spero Dedes, Tom McCarthy, Rich Waltz, John Sadak, Chris Lewis, Jordan Kent, Carter Blackburn
- NCAA March Madness – Ian Eagle, Brian Anderson, Kevin Harlan, Andrew Catalon, Brad Nessler, Spero Dedes, Brandon Gaudin, Tom McCarthy
- Soccer on CBS – Clive Tyldesley, Chris Wittyngham, Nico Cantor, Adrian Garcia Marquez, JP Dellacamera, Jacqui Oatley, Kate Scott
- BIG3 – Ed Cohen, Alex del Barrio
- WNBA – Jordan Kent, Chris Lewis

==== Color commentators ====
- NFL on CBS – J. J. Watt, Ross Tucker, Trent Green, Logan Ryan, Adam Archuleta, Robert Turbin, Luke Kuechly, Gene Steratore
- PGA Tour on CBS – Trevor Immelman, Frank Nobilo, Colt Knost
- College Football on CBS Sports – Charles Davis, Adam Breneman, Brian Kelly, Doug Pederson, Gene Steratore
- College Basketball on CBS Sports – Grant Hill, Clark Kellogg, Bill Raftery, Dan Bonner, Jim Spanarkel, Steve Lappas, Gene Steratore, Pete Gillen, Chris Walker, Robbie Hummel, Bruce Pearl
- NCAA March Madness – Grant Hill, Bill Raftery, Jim Jackson, Robbie Hummel, Stan Van Gundy, Steve Lappas, Chris Webber, Jim Spanarkel, Dan Bonner, Candace Parker, Wally Szczerbiak, Gene Steratore
- Soccer on CBS – Robert Green, Tony Meola, Matteo Bonetti, Maurice Edu, Marcelo Balboa, Janelly Farías, Lori Lindsey, McCall Zerboni, Jen Beattie, Christina Unkel
- BIG3 – Jim Jackson, Grant Long
- WNBA – Isis Young, Debbie Antonelli

==== Reporters ====
- NFL on CBS – Tracy Wolfson, Evan Washburn, Melanie Collins, A. J. Ross, Aditi Kinkhabwala, Amanda Balionis, Tiffany Blackmon, Amanda Guerra
- The NFL Today – Rich Perez
- PGA Tour on CBS – Dottie Pepper, Mark Immelman, Johnson Wagner, Amanda Balionis
- College Football on CBS Sports – Jenny Dell, Tiffany Blackmon, Jordan Giorgio, Brandon Baylor
- College Basketball on CBS Sports – Tracy Wolfson, Evan Washburn, A. J. Ross, Jenny Dell, Tiffany Blackmon, Jon Rothstein, Keiana Martin
- NCAA March Madness – Tracy Wolfson, Allie LaForce, Lauren Shehadi, Evan Washburn, Jon Rothstein, Andy Katz, A. J. Ross, Jared Greenberg
- BIG3 – Chris Haynes
- Soccer on CBS – Guillem Balagué, Geoff Shreeves, Anita Jones, Claudia Pagán, Aly Trost Martin, Hailey Sutton, Christine Cupo
- WNBA – Tiffany Blackmon, A. J. Ross, Chris Williamson

==== Studio hosts ====
- The NFL Today – James Brown, Nate Burleson
- College Football on CBS Sports – Adam Zucker, Brent Stover
- Inside College Basketball – Adam Zucker, Brent Stover, Nate Burleson
- Road to the Final Four – Ernie Johnson, Adam Zucker, Adam Lefkoe, Nate Burleson, Jamie Erdahl
- Soccer on CBS – Kate Scott, Poppy Miller, Hannah Cash, Lisa Carlin
- BIG3 – Ed Cohen
- WNBA – Jenny Dell

==== Studio analysts ====
- The NFL Today – Bill Cowher, Nate Burleson, Russell Wilson, Kyle Long
- College Football on CBS Sports – Brian Jones, Rick Neuheisel, Aaron Taylor, Brian Kelly
- Inside College Basketball – Clark Kellogg, Seth Davis, Wally Szczerbiak, Robbie Hummel, Bruce Pearl, Renee Montgomery
- Road to the Final Four – Clark Kellogg, Seth Davis, Kenny Smith, Charles Barkley, Bruce Pearl, Jamal Mashburn, Renee Montgomery, Jalen Rose
- Soccer on CBS – Thierry Henry, Jamie Carragher, Peter Schmeichel, Micah Richards, Nigel Reo-Coker, Troy Deeney, Mike Grella, Marco Messina, Clint Dempsey, Charlie Davies, Jimmy Conrad, Ian Joy, Darian Jenkins, Kelley O'Hara, Ali Riley
- BIG3 – Chris Haynes
- WNBA – Renee Montgomery, Lisa Leslie

=== Former ===
==== Play-by-play ====
- NFL on CBS – Marv Albert, Brian Anderson, Gary Bender, Jack Buck, Don Criqui, Bob Costas, Mike Emrick, Dick Enberg, Bob Fouts, Frank Glieber, Mike Gorman, Greg Gumbel, Gus Johnson, Craig Bolerjack, Verne Lundquist, Bill Macatee, Sean McDonough, Al Michaels, Brent Musburger, Jim McKay, Tim Ryan, Ted Robinson, Ray Scott, Chris Schenkel, Vin Scully, Dick Stockton, Pat Summerall, Chris Schenkel, Dave Sims, Gary Thorne, Steve Zabriskie
- Thursday Night Football – Jim Nantz, Greg Gumbel, Ian Eagle, Kevin Harlan
- PGA Tour on CBS – Chris Schenkel, Sean McDonough, Brent Musburger, Vin Scully, Pat Summerall, Jack Whitaker, Bill Macatee, Verne Lundquist
- College Football on CBS Sports – Gary Bender, Craig Bolerjack, Don Criqui, Frank Glieber, Verne Lundquist, Brent Musburger, Noah Eagle
- College Basketball on CBS – Gary Bender, Bob Carpenter, Irv Cross, Jim Durham, Mike Emrick, Dick Enberg, Frank Glieber, Mike Gorman, Bill Macatee, Jim McKay, Sean McDonough, Brent Musburger, Jim Nantz, Tim Ryan, Ted Robinson, Ray Scott, Chris Schenkel, Vin Scully, Dave Sims, Pat Summerall, Michele Tafoya, Gary Thorne, Steve Zabriskie
- Major League Baseball on CBS – Jack Buck, Dizzy Dean, Sean McDonough, Vin Scully, Dick Stockton
- NBA on CBS – Gary Bender, Bob Carpenter, Irv Cross, Jim Durham, Mike Emrick, Dick Enberg, Frank Glieber, Mike Gorman, Jim McKay, Sean McDonough, Brent Musburger, Tim Ryan, Ted Robinson, Ray Scott, Chris Schenkel, Vin Scully, Dave Sims, Pat Summerall, Gary Thorne, Steve Zabriskie
- NHL on CBS – Dan Kelly, Bud Palmer
- Olympics on CBS – Phil Liggett, Brad Nessler, Bud Palmer, Tim Ryan, Chris Schenkel, Al Trautwig
- NASCAR on CBS – Chris Economaki, Mike Joy, Ken Squier, Bill Stephens
- Tennis on CBS – Bud Collins, Ian Eagle, Dick Enberg, Frank Glieber, Bill Macatee, Sean McDonough, Ted Robinson, Jim Nantz, Pat O'Brien, Tim Ryan, Brent Musburger, Vin Scully, Ken Squier, Pat Summerall
- SRX – Allen Bestwick
- Tour de France – Phil Liggett, John Tesh, Al Trautwig
- National Professional Soccer League – Jack Whitaker
- Soccer on CBS – Peter Drury, Andres Cordero
- WNBA – Lisa Byington

==== Analysts ====
- NFL on CBS – Terry Bradshaw, Irv Cross, Dan Dierdorf, John Madden, Tom Brookshier, Frank Gifford, Hank Stram, Pat Summerall, Solomon Wilcots, Bruce Arians, Steve Tasker, Dan Fouts, Rich Gannon, Jay Feely, Charles Davis, Jason McCourty, Tony Romo
  - NFL on Nickelodeon – Gabrielle Nevaeh Green, Iain Armitage, Rob Gronkowski
- The NFL Today – Irv Cross, Phyllis George, Jimmy "The Greek" Snyder, Jayne Kennedy, Jack Whitaker, Charlsie Cantey, Dan Dierdorf, Ken Stabler, Dan Fouts, Dick Butkus, Will McDonough, Terry Bradshaw, Lesley Visser, Pat O'Brien, Jim Gray, Matt Millen, Marcus Allen, Brent Jones, George Seifert, Michael Lombardi, Craig James, Randy Cross, Jerry Glanville, Mike Ditka, Deion Sanders, Dan Marino, Boomer Esiason, Shannon Sharpe, Tony Gonzalez, Bart Scott, Phil Simms, Jason La Canfora, Jim Rome, Matt Ryan, Jonathan Jones
- Thursday Night Football – Tony Romo, Phil Simms, Marshall Faulk, Steve Mariucci, Michael Irvin, Kurt Warner, LaDainian Tomlinson, Bill Cowher, Deion Sanders, Willie McGinest, Trent Green, Dan Fouts, Rich Gannon
- PGA Tour on CBS – Ken Venturi, Peter Oosterhuis, Gary McCord, David Feherty, Nick Faldo, Ian Baker-Finch
- College Football on CBS – Craig James, Rich Perez, Gary Danielson, Ross Tucker, Logan Ryan
- College Basketball on CBS – Al McGuire, Quinn Buckner, Stephen Bardo, Kareem Abdul-Jabbar, Bill Walton, Doug Collins, Rick Barry, Billy Cunningham, Tom Heinsohn, Rod Hundley, Bill Russell, Mendy Rudolph, Sonny Hill, Oscar Robertson, Steve Kerr, Matt Guokas, Larry Conley, Chris Webber, Jay Wright
- Major League Baseball on CBS – Jim Kaat, Tim McCarver
- NBA on CBS – Al McGuire, Quinn Buckner, Doug Collins, Rick Barry, Billy Cunningham, Tom Heinsohn, Rod Hundley, Bill Russell, Mendy Rudolph, Sonny Hill, Oscar Robertson, Matt Guokas, Larry Conley
- NHL on CBS – Fred Cusick
- NASCAR on CBS – Buddy Baker, Neil Bonnett, David Hobbs, Ned Jarrett
- Tennis on CBS – Julie Anthony, Mary Carillo, Jim Courier, Julie Heldman, Jack Kramer, John McEnroe, Patrick McEnroe, Tony Trabert
- National Professional Soccer League – Danny Blanchflower
- SRX – Willy T. Ribbs, Conor Daly
- Soccer on CBS – Jim Beglin, Ray Hudson
- WNBA – Julianne Viani-Braen

==== Reporters ====
- NFL on CBS – Lesley Visser, Pat O'Brien, Jim Gray, Irv Cross, Will McDonough, Armen Keteyian, Michele Tafoya, Bonnie Bernstein, Jamie Erdahl, Jenny Dell, John Schriffen
  - Thursday Night Football – Jenny Dell, Tracy Wolfson, Evan Washburn, Jamie Erdahl, Stacey Dales
  - NFL on Nickelodeon – Lex Lumpkin
- PGA Tour on CBS – Dick Enberg, Peter Kostis,
- College Football on CBS – Sam Ryan, Tracy Wolfson, Allie LaForce, John Schriffen, Jamie Erdahl
- College Basketball on CBS – Bonnie Bernstein, Sam Ryan, Michele Tafoya, Solomon Wilcots, Rachel Nichols, Otis Livingston, John Schriffen, Jamie Erdahl, Lisa Byington
- Major League Baseball on CBS – Jim Gray
- NASCAR on CBS – Dave Despain,
- Olympics on CBS – Harry Reasoner, Mary Carillo, Lesley Visser, Michael Barkann, Craig James, Darren Pang
- SRX – Willy T. Ribs, Matt Yocum
- Tennis on CBS – Jill Arrington, Bonnie Bernstein, John Dockery, Mary Joe Fernández, Andrea Joyce, Summer Sanders, Michele Tafoya, Lesley Visser, Tracy Wolfson
- WNBA – A. J. Ross, Tina Cervasio, Emily Proud, Keiana Martin

==== Studio hosts ====
- The NFL Today – Frank Gifford, Brent Musburger, Jack Whitaker, Jim Nantz, Greg Gumbel
- College Football on CBS – Tim Brando, Greg Gumbel, Brent Musburger, Jim Nantz
- NBA on CBS – Jim Nantz, Dick Stockton, Brent Musburger, Pat O'Brien, Sam Ryan
- College Basketball on CBS – Greg Gumbel, Jim Nantz, Dick Stockton, Brent Musburger, Pat O'Brien, Sam Ryan
- Inside College Basketball – Greg Gumbel
- Road to the Final Four – Greg Gumbel
- CBS Sports Spectacular – Jack Whitaker, Dick Stockton, Brent Musburger, John Tesh
- Thursday Night Football – James Brown, Rich Eisen
- SRX – Lindsay Czarniak
- WNBA TipOff – Sarah Kustok

==== Behind the scenes ====
- Don Robertson

== Presidents of CBS Sports ==
- Robert Wussler (1976–1978)
- Frank M. Smith, Jr. (1978–1980)
- Van Gordon Sauter (1980–1981)
- Neal Pilson (1981–1984)
- Peter Lund (1984–1986)
- Neal Pilson (1986–1994)
- David Kenin (1994–1996)
- Sean McManus (1996–2013)
- David Berson (2013–present)

== CBS Sports Network ==

CBS Sports Network is a sports-oriented American digital cable and satellite channel that is operated by Paramount Skydance through CBS Sports. Launched as the National College Sports Network in 2002, then renamed as College Sports Television in 2003, CBS's then-parent company Viacom acquired the network in 2005 and later renamed it CBS College Sports Network in 2008. The network had always focused on college sports, but in 2011, CBS rebranded the network as CBS Sports Network as a move to reposition the network to include mainstream sports—including coverage of minor professional sports leagues such as the Arena Football League and Major League Lacrosse, although college sports are still aired frequently by the network.

== CBS Sports Radio ==
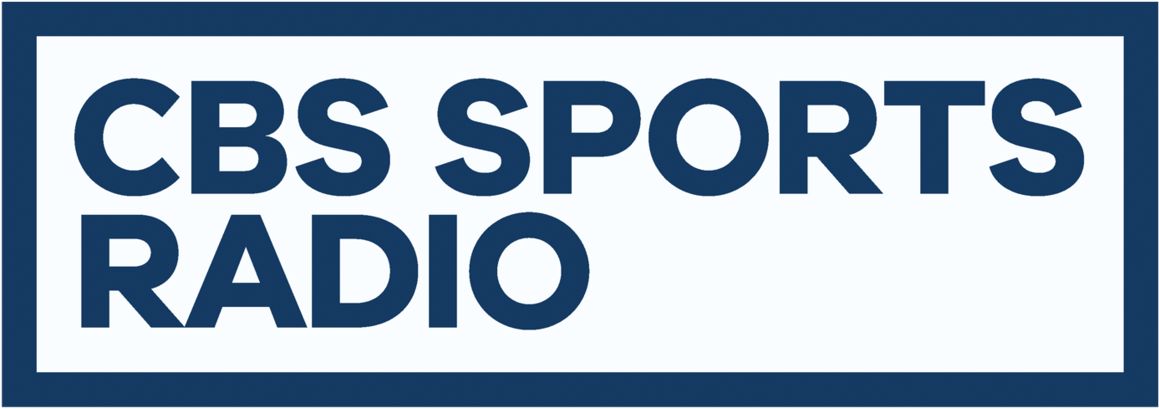

CBS Sports Radio was a sports radio network that launched on September 4, 2012, with hourly sports news updates. It began offering a full 24-hour schedule of sports talk programming on January 2, 2013. CBS Sports Radio was originally owned by CBS Radio, with Westwood One handling distribution and marketing of the network. Sports radio stations that were owned by Entercom (now Audacy) and Cumulus Media carried part of the full schedule of programming, while eight Entercom-owned stations carry network programming throughout the day. In addition to carriage on terrestrial stations, CBS Sports Radio streamed its programming on the internet. CBS issued a cease and desist order in early April 2024 to all remaining affiliates informing them to cease using the CBS trademark by April 15 (CBS Radio had merged with Entercom in 2017 and CBS/Paramount Global has allowed use of the CBS name and Eyemark logo under a limited license to expire in late 2037; it withdrew permission for the use of the Eyemark by CBSSR at the end of 2019). Since then, Audacy has owned and operated the remnants of the network under the brand Infinity Sports Network, utilizing the name of a forerunner company, Infinity Broadcasting.

== CBS Sports HQ ==

On February 26, 2018, CBS Sports launched CBS Sports HQ, a 24-hour streaming sports news channel modeled after CBS News's streaming news channel.

== CBS Sports Digital ==
The online arm of CBS Sports is CBSSports.com. CBS purchased SportsLine.com in 2004, and today CBSSports.com is part of Paramount Streaming. On February 26, 2018, following up on the success of their online news network CBSN, CBS Sports launched CBS Sports HQ, a 24/7, online only, linear sports news network. The network focuses entirely on sports news, results, highlights and analysis. (CBS Sports college sports and golf programming that it distributes over the air is generally made available for free via separate streams, as are a limited number of NFL national telecasts; the remainder requires a Paramount+ (formerly CBS All Access) subscription to be viewed online, with CBS Sports Network programming requiring a TV Everywhere subscription.)

== Branding ==
On August 31, 2013, CBS Sports rolled out its previous graphics and animation package that was first used in the network's coverage of Super Bowl XLVII. Additionally, in compliance with the Active Format Description #10 code, CBS Sports switched to a 16:9 aspect ratio letterbox presentation used for all sports programming, including the SEC on CBS and the NFL on CBS broadcasts.

On November 30, 2015, CBS Sports unveiled a new rectangular logo, which premiered on-air during its coverage of Super Bowl 50, and was intended to provide consistency between the division's platforms. It replaced an existing logo that had dated back to 1981. In October 2020, CBS announced that all of its major divisions would adopt a unified branding scheme built around the components of the CBS eye logo, a new sonic branding, and TT Norms Pro as a corporate typeface. The implementation of the branding by CBS Sports launched during the lead-up to Super Bowl LV, which introduced a new on-air graphics package that conforms to the corporate design language.

== See also ==
=== Related articles ===
- TNT Sports
  - TBS
  - TNT
  - TruTV
  - HBO Max
- Univision Deportes
  - TUDN
  - Univision
  - Vix

=== Main competitors ===
- ESPN
  - ABC
  - ESPN
  - ESPN2
  - ESPNews
  - ESPNU
  - ESPN app
  - ACC Network
  - SEC Network
- Fox Sports
  - Fox
  - FS1
  - FS2
  - Big Ten Network
  - Tubi
- NBC Sports
  - NBC
  - NBCSN
  - Peacock
