= Sandy Grossman =

American sports television director

- Grossman in 1993
- Born: Sanford Morton Grossman; June 12, 1935; Newark, New Jersey, U.S.
- Died: April 2, 2014 (aged 78); Boca Raton, Florida, U.S.
- Education: University of Alabama
- Occupation: NFL Director

Sanford Morton "Sandy" Grossman (June 12, 1935 – April 2, 2014) was an American sports television director. He directed television broadcasts of 10 Super Bowls, 18 NBA Finals, 5 Stanley Cup finals and Olympic hockey matches.

== Early life and career ==
He was born in Newark, New Jersey. After graduating from Weequahic High School, he studied broadcasting at the University of Alabama, where he called football games for the school radio station. He graduated in 1957 and wanted to pursue a career in the communication industry, but believed he did not have the right voice to be a broadcaster. Grossman worked as an usher for the Ed Sullivan Theater for several years before obtaining employment at the local CBS station, Channel 2. In 1963, he became a production assistant for CBS Sports.

=== CBS Sports (1963-94) ===
He was the chief director of broadcasting NBA games during the early 1970s and soon became the main NFL director. Grossmann innovated using music at the break of basketball games, and after he played "The Hustle" by Van McCoy, McCoy sent him a gold record in thanks of his promotion.

Grossman began working alongside John Madden and Pat Summerall on CBS in 1981, and their partnership lasted 21 seasons. Madden insisted that Grossman and producer Bob Stenner watch coaches’ films of the NFL teams, which helped Grossman choose the best shots to pair with Madden's commentary. Madden credits him for being the first director to widen the camera shot to incorporate footage of outside linebackers. He created these broadcasts out of a production truck crammed with television monitors that formed a screen shot. During a Giants-Bengals game in 1991, Stenner and Grossman made 1,100 decisions about camera angles and the like.

=== FOX Sports (1994-2012) ===
Summerall and Madden decided to move to Fox Sports after that network acquired broadcasting rights to NFL games in 1994, and Stenner and Grossman followed suit. He retired in 2012. That year, the Elite Football League of India hired Grossman to teach its camera crews how to cover the American sport. “There were some guys who couldn’t follow the players,” he said. “I said, ‘Get the kicker,’ and some of them didn’t know where to find him.”.

== Awards and honors ==
Grossman won eight Emmy Awards for his directing. In 2026, he was posthumously honored with the Pete Rozelle Radio-Television Award from the Pro Football Hall of Fame.

== Personal life ==
Grossman died from cancer on April 2, 2014, in Boca Raton, Florida. He was survived by his wife, Faithe; sons Bobby and Dean; daughters, Jodi Grossman Rose and Bari Grossman Rosenholtz; and eight grandchildren.
