= Giselle Fernández =

American television journalist and anchor

- Born: May 15, 1961 (age 65); Mexico City, Mexico
- Other name: Giselle Fernandez
- Citizenship: American
- Education: California State University, Sacramento
- Occupation: Television news anchor
- Years active: 1983–present
- Spouse: John Farrand (m. 2002; div. 2014)
- Children: 1
- Awards: Five Emmy Awards
- Website: Giselle.com

Giselle Fernández (born May 15, 1961) is an American television journalist and anchor for Spectrum News 1. Her appearances on network television include reporting and guest anchoring for CBS Early Show, CBS Evening News, Today, and NBC Nightly News, regular host for Access Hollywood, and contestant on Dancing with the Stars.

== Early life and education ==
Fernández was born in Mexico City and was brought to East Los Angeles in the United States at the age of four. Her Catholic father was a flamenco dancer, while her Jewish mother was a student of Mexican folklore. She graduated from Newbury Park High School in 1979 and then attended California State University, Sacramento, where she graduated in 1982 earning her B.A. in Journalism and Government.

== Career ==
Her television career began in 1983 with brief stops at KRDO-TV in Colorado Springs, Colorado, and then KEYT-TV in Santa Barbara, California. In 1985 she joined KTLA in Los Angeles as a reporter and weekend anchor. She was recommended to KTLA by actor Fess Parker, who lived in the Santa Barbara area and was a friend of KTLA's news managing director at the time. Two years later Fernandez moved to CBS-owned WBBM-TV in Chicago, and in 1989 to WCIX CBS's newly owned station in Miami. In 1988 she garnered some controversy in Chicago when she went boating with John Cappas, a drug dealer being sought by authorities, then accompanied him to his arrest by federal agents.

She gained her first national news job in October 1991 for CBS News, when she moved to New York City and became a correspondent and back-up anchor for the morning, evening, and weekend news broadcasts. She later moved to NBC, where she anchored Weekend Today and the Sunday edition of NBC Nightly News, and filled in for Brian Williams on the Saturday edition, and undertook various special reporting assignments in the U.S. and elsewhere. During this period of national news coverage, Fernández reported on the crisis from Cuban immigration, unrest in Haiti, the 1989 U.S. invasion of Panama, the trial of the conspirators from the 1993 World Trade Center bombing, and a scud missile attack while covering the Persian Gulf War. She was invited to make a rare interview of Fidel Castro, then president of Cuba.

From 1996 to 1999, Fernández was the co-host for Access Hollywood, an entertainment news program on NBC. She then co-hosted the This Week in History show on the History Channel. In October 2001, she returned to Los Angeles and rejoined KTLA. She left this position in August 2003 to pursue a variety of special projects, including making a movie and writing children's books. In 2004, her book titled Gigi and the Birthday Ring was published through the Laredo Publishing Company.

She is president of Skinny Hippo Productions, her own production company, and is co-president of F Squared Productions, where she is a developer of film and television projects. Giselle now works for Charter Communications' Spectrum News 1 Southern California.

Fernandez anchored Your Morning on Spectrum News 1 for six years since the launch of the channel in 2018. In August of 2024, Fernandez moved to the afternoon slot with a new three hour program called Rush Hour. She continues to host the Emmy-award winning weekly series LA Stories.

== Awards ==
Fernández has won five Emmy Awards for journalism. The Los Angeles Press Club gave Fernandez The President's Award for Impact on Media in 2023. She is a member of the Smithsonian National Board for Latino Initiatives and has worked on the board of trustees of the Children's Hospital Los Angeles. In 2006, she was named the year's Outstanding Philanthropist by the Association of Fundraising Professionals.

== Personal life ==
While in Chicago, she met Ron Kershaw, who was previously involved with Jessica Savitch. The two were engaged, but Kershaw died of pancreatic cancer and liver cancer. A month later her father died of Alzheimer's disease. In 2002, she married British executive John Farrand, former CEO of Panavision, Inc.; they had a daughter, Talei. The couple separated in April 2014. Fernández participated as a contestant on the second season of ABC's Dancing with the Stars in January 2006, but was the third contestant to be eliminated. She partnered with Jonathan Roberts and had an average of 23 points.

Media offices
Preceded by none	Host of Access Hollywood with Larry Mendte (1996 to 1997) and with Pat O'Brien (1997 to 1999); 1996–1999	Succeeded by Nancy O'Dell with Pat O'Brien
