= Nancy O'Dell =

American television personality (born 1966)

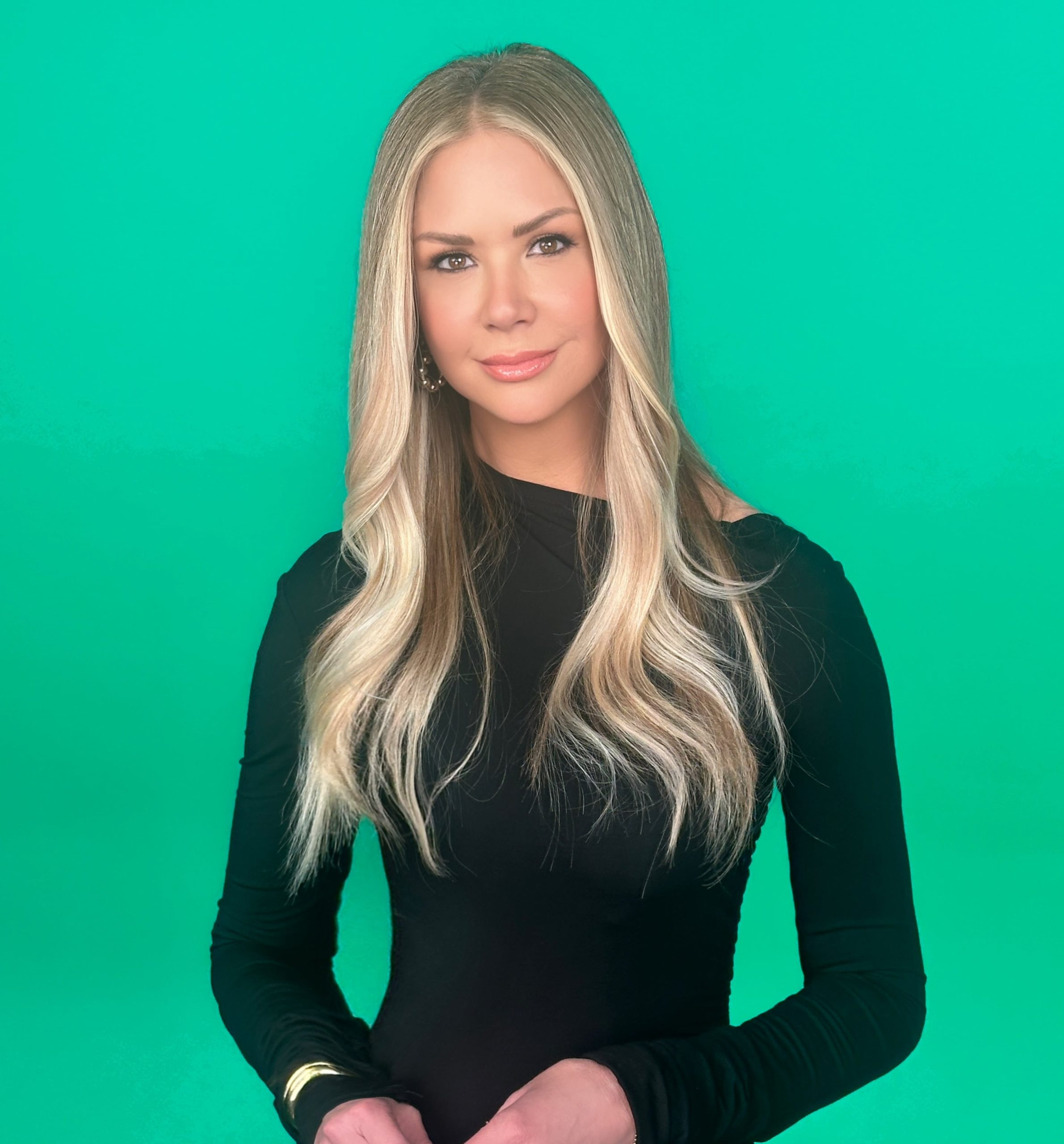
- Nancy O'Dell in 2024 on Crime Exposé
- Born: Nancy Evelyn Humphries; February 25, 1966 (age 60); Sumter, South Carolina, U.S.
- Education: Clemson University
- Occupations: Television journalist, personality
- Years active: 1987–present
- Notable credits: Access Hollywood; Nashville Star; Entertainment Tonight
- Title: Miss South Carolina 1987
- Spouses: Richard O'Dell (m. 1995; div. 2004) Keith Zubchevich (m. 2005; div. 2018)
- Children: 1
- Awards: Miss South Carolina 1987 (Winner); Miss America 1988 (Miss Lifestyle and Fitness); Miss South Carolina USA 1990 (1st Runner-Up)

Nancy O'Dell (born Nancy Evelyn Humphries; February 25, 1966) is an American television host and entertainment journalist. She served as co-anchor of the syndicated entertainment news shows Access Hollywood and Entertainment Tonight.

== Early life ==
O'Dell was born in 1966 in Sumter, South Carolina, and moved to Myrtle Beach as an infant. She has one sister. After her 1984 graduation from the now-defunct Coastal Academy High School, she graduated with a summa cum laude bachelor's degree in marketing from Clemson University in 1990. At Clemson, O'Dell joined Kappa Kappa Gamma. She won the Miss South Carolina pageant in 1987 and represented the state at Miss America 1988, where she won a preliminary swimsuit award. In 1990, in the Miss South Carolina USA pageant, she finished first runner-up to Gina Tolleson, who became the first runner-up in Miss USA 1990 before winning Miss World that year.

== Career ==
=== Early career ===
O'Dell began her broadcasting career as a reporter and anchor at WPDE-TV in Myrtle Beach, South Carolina. She later worked as morning news anchor and crime reporter at WCBD-TV in Charleston, South Carolina. While there, her reports on the lenient police approach to DUI cases led to a State Law Enforcement Division investigation that resulted in authorities issuing more stringent directive for such cases. She was honored by the Associated Press with the Best Report of the Year Award (all media, South Carolina). In 1993, she joined NBC's WTVJ in Miami, co-anchoring the 5:30 p.m. news with Jackie Nespral. O'Dell left that station in 1995 to move to Las Vegas. While there she worked as an entertainment reporter for the nationally syndicated tabloid show A Current Affair until the show ended in 1996.

=== Access Hollywood (1996–2009) ===
O'Dell joined the entertainment news program Access Hollywood when the program debuted in 1996. In addition to her work as Access Hollywood's lead anchor, O'Dell contributed to NBC News' Today and Dateline NBC. She covered such ceremonies as the Oscars, Emmys, Grammys, and Golden Globe Awards, as well as co-hosting a number of pre-shows and arrivals for the Emmys and Golden Globes.

O'Dell co-hosted the Miss USA and Miss Universe competitions in 2004 and 2005. She co-hosted the New York City St. Patrick's Day Parade on WNBC from 2004 to 2006. She co-hosted the Miss USA 2006 pageant with Drew Lachey, the Miss Universe 2006 pageant with Carlos Ponce, and the Miss USA 2007 pageant with Tim Vincent. During this period, she and Donald Trump worked together. Years later, her name was thrust into an ugly and durable spotlight when Trump made crass comments naming O'Dell and Arianne Zucker, while being recorded—perhaps unethically—on a microphone he knew he was wearing, that, in combination with other remarks, engulfed his first presidential campaign in national scandal, bringing her name to the attention of many American voters, in a negative political context, who had otherwise remained indifferent to her career.

O'Dell appeared in minor roles in the television series Charmed (season 1 finale (1999) and season 5 premiere (2002). She guest starred in The Simpsons episode "Hello Gutter, Hello Fadder" (1999), voicing herself. She also portrayed herself in Scream 2 (1997), Scream 3 (2000), and Scream 4 (2011) and served as host and consulting producer of the USA Network talent competition Nashville Star for its first two seasons.

On January 13, 2008, after the 65th Annual Golden Globe Awards were canceled as a result of the 2007–08 Writers Guild of America strike, she co-hosted NBC's 65th Annual Golden Globe Awards Winners Special with Access Hollywood co-anchor Billy Bush.

In 2009, O'Dell hosted NBC's pre-show for the 66th Annual Golden Globes with Tiki Barber and Brooke Burke. She portrayed herself in the Hannah Montana season three episode "Cheat It". She also appeared on the Fox sitcom Brothers, and in the same year she and Maria Menounos guest co-hosted WWE Raw on October 12. O'Dell was to participate in the eighth season of Dancing with the Stars, paired with professional dancer Tony Dovolani, but had to withdraw before the season started after tearing her meniscus during training; her replacement was Melissa Rycroft. O'Dell underwent arthroscopic surgery to repair it on March 20, 2009.

O'Dell's departure from Access Hollywood was announced in December 2009. She left the show with two years left on her contract.

On June 22, 2010, O'Dell hosted the Nashville Rising concert to provide flood relief for Nashville residents, after the floods in May of that year. She shared hosting duties with Tim McGraw and Faith Hill. In 2011, she gave an interview for a documentary film Still Screaming: The Ultimate Scary Movie Retrospective.

=== Entertainment Tonight (2011–2019) ===
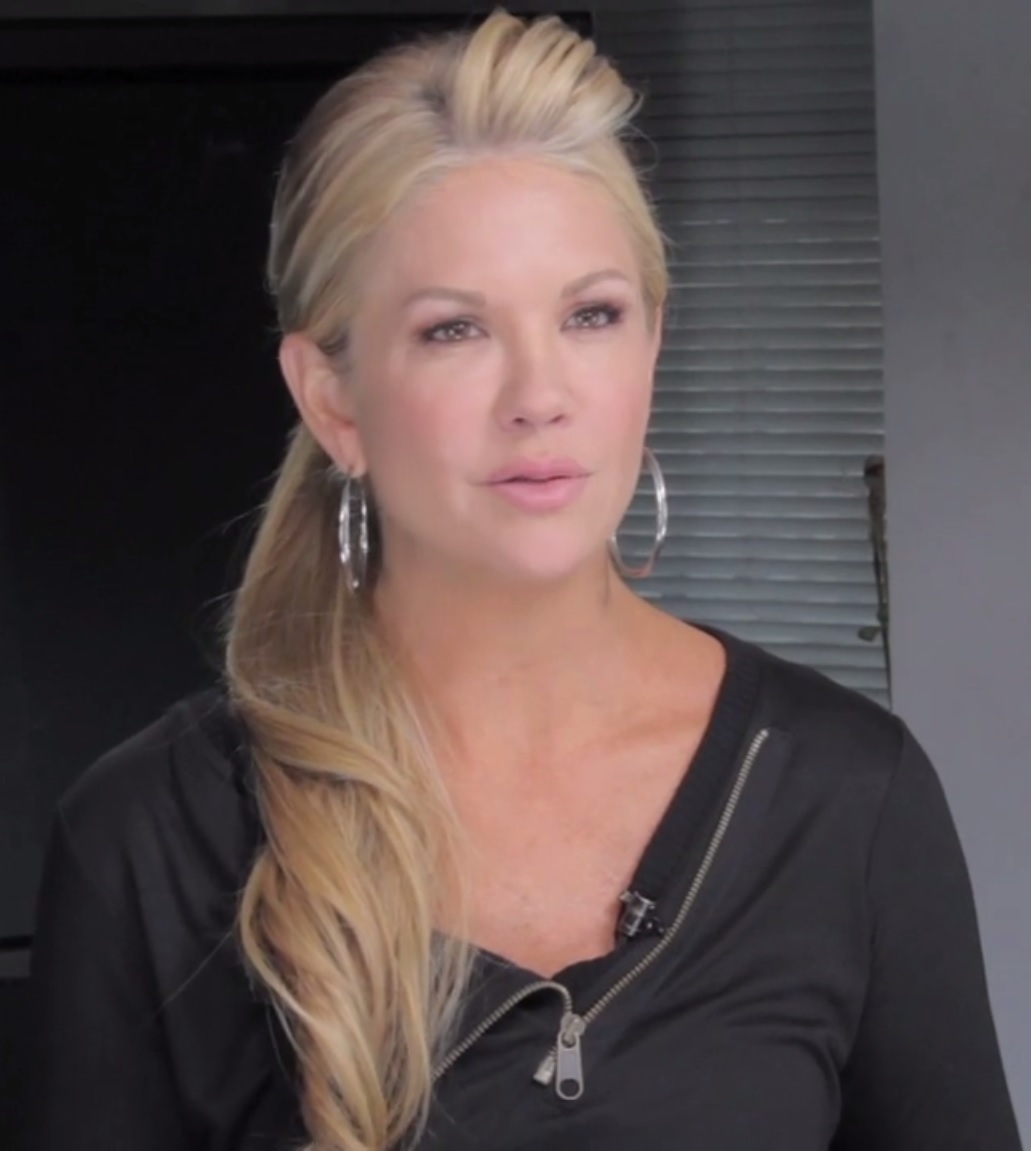
Nancy O'Dell on Olive Coco TV in 2011.

On January 3, 2011, O'Dell joined Entertainment Tonight as a special correspondent, and she succeeded Mary Hart as co-anchor after Hart left the show in May 2011. An avid scrapbooker, in 2010 O'Dell partnered with Creative Memories to release her first collection of scrapbooking supplies, the Hummingbird Collection, and her second book, Full of Love: Mom-to-Mom Advice for Enriching Families with Simple Photo Albums and Scrapbooking.

On August 2, 2019, O'Dell announced on-air that she would be leaving Entertainment Tonight after that day's broadcast. She also paid respects to her manager who recently died.

=== Crime Exposé with Nancy O'Dell (2024–present) ===
In September 2024, O'Dell began hosting and producing the nationally-syndicated true crime series, Crime Exposé with Nancy O'Dell.

== Personal life ==
O'Dell was married to Dr. Richard O'Dell from September 30, 1995, to November 4, 2004. In 2005, she married Keith Zubchevich. O'Dell gave birth to their daughter, Ashby Grace, in June 2007, at Cedars-Sinai Medical Center in Los Angeles. She said unexpected and surprising changes happened to her body during the pregnancy that prompted her to write a parenting book, Full of Life. She is one of the Muscular Dystrophy Association's National ALS Ambassadors. In September 2016, O'Dell filed for legal separation from Zubchevich and in November 2017, they filed for divorce.

In May 2013, O'Dell received an Honorary Doctorate of Humanities from Clemson University. At the ceremony, she spoke to the graduates, encouraging them to never give up in pursuing their dreams: "I decided that I would rather fail doing something I enjoyed than be successful doing something that would just be a grind [....] my wish for all of you is that you will do the same. Be who you are because you'll always be right."

Media offices
Preceded by Giselle Fernández; Pat O'Brien	Host of Access Hollywood; 1999–2009; With: Pat O'Brien (1999–2004); Billy Bush (2004–2009)	Succeeded by Billy Bush
Preceded by Billy Bush; Daisy Fuentes	Miss Universe host 2005–2006	Succeeded by Mario Lopez
Preceded by Billy Bush; Daisy Fuentes	Miss USA host 2004–2007	Succeeded by Donny Osmond; Marie Osmond
Preceded by Mary Hart	Co-host of Entertainment Tonight; 2011–2019	Succeeded by Current
