= Frank M. Smith Jr. =

American sports broadcaster (1927–1998)

Frank McGregor Smith Jr. (May 28, 1927 – April 2, 1998) was an American sports broadcaster.

== Early life ==
Smith was born on May 28, 1927, in Indianapolis, Indiana. He began his academic career at the prestigious prep school Deerfield Academy (class of 1945). Immediately following his graduation he entered World War II serving for the U.S. Army in Germany. Upon his return to the states, Frank enrolled at New York University where he earned a B.A. in Marketing.

== Career at CBS ==
It was soon thereafter that Frank would begin his career in the broadcasting world, working as a shipping clerk at Columbia Broadcasting Systems (CBS). His career at CBS was both long and accomplished. His final title at the company was President of CBS Sports. He had also held the title of Vice President of National Sales for many years. Frank was responsible for creating an unrivaled relationship with The Masters on CBS, where it remains still this day. Frank is also credited for the introduction of putting MLB and NHL coast to coast.

== Later life ==
After leaving CBS, Frank became the first paid president of the National Golf Foundation, located in Palm Beach, Florida in 1982.

He would later go on to be the head of the U.S. Equestrian team and develop a company called Playfone, responsible for integrating personal headsets for fans at the U.S. Open and the Super Bowl.

In 1994, he suffered a stroke that lead to his eventual death on April 2, 1998, aged 70.
