= John Farrand =

British-American business executive

John Stuart Farrand (born 1945) is a British-American business executive.

Farrand worked at Music Hire Group Limited for 14 years, serving as managing director beginning in 1973. From 1980 until 1985, he was a senior executive at Warner Communications which included heading up the Atari Coin-Operated Games division. From 1985 to 1988, Farrand served as president and chief operating officer of Panavision, and from 1998 to 2003, as chief executive officer.

In the 1980s, Warner Communications sold Panavision to an investment consortium led by Farrand, Ted Field, and Alan Hirschfield. Five months later, Farrand and Field bought out the other investors. They sold the company in 1987.

In 2002, Farrand married journalist Giselle Fernández with whom he had one daughter. The couple divorced in 2014.

In 2003, Farrand resigned from Panavision when his contract wasn't renewed amid efforts by Panavision to overcome financial difficulties.
