= John Sadak =

American sports announcer (born 1979)

- Born: September 15, 1979 (age 47)
- Education: Rowan University
- Occupation: Sports commentator
- Sports commentary career
- Genre: Play-by-play
- Sports: Major League Baseball; NCAA March Madness; College Football
- Employer: MLB Network (2026–present); Westwood One (2015-present); CBS Sports (2014-present)

John Sadak (born September 15, 1979) is an American TV/radio sports announcer with the Cincinnati Reds, CBS Sports, Westwood One radio, CBS Sports Network, the ESPN family of networks and Fox Sports 1.

== Personal life ==
Sadak is a two-time Rowan University graduate and a New York City native. The Brick Memorial High School alumnus who grew up in Edgewater, New Jersey and Brick Township, New Jersey lives in greater Cincinnati, Ohio.

== Broadcasting career ==
Sadak's broadcast work includes the play-by-play of NFL football, NBA basketball, MLB baseball, college football, basketball, baseball, softball, ice hockey, soccer, lacrosse, volleyball, water polo and field hockey. Sadak's work has aired on CBS Sports, Westwood One, CBS Sports Network, WGN-TV, NBC Sports Chicago, ESPNU, ESPNEWS, ESPN Radio, ESPN3, Longhorn Network, Fox Sports 1, Fox Sports 2, Root Sports, Fox College Sports, The Comcast Network, Comcast SportsNet, and Verizon FiOS1.

He has provided on-site reports for the Philadelphia Phillies, 76ers, and Flyers for ESPN Radio National. He spent nearly a decade as the voice of Princeton Tigers men's basketball, Delaware Fighting Blue Hens women's basketball, and the Wilmington Blue Rocks.

Beginning in 2015, Sadak's Westwood One work expanded to include the NCAA men's basketball tournament, the NCAA women's basketball Final Four, and the NFL on Westwood One. For five seasons (2013–17) he served as the lead TV/radio voice of the Triple-A affiliate of the New York Yankees, the Scranton/Wilkes-Barre RailRiders. Starting with the 2018–19 season, he began working select games as a fill-in TV voice for the Chicago Bulls on both WGN-TV and NBC Sports Chicago. In 2019, he joined the New York Mets Radio Network as a fill-in radio announcer covering New York Mets games on WCBS.

On February 4, 2021, the Cincinnati Reds named Sadak their TV play by play announcer for the 2021 season, with Sadak saying, "I want this to be my forever home."

== Awards ==
Sadak has been honored by Baseball America, Ballpark Digest, the National Sportscasters and Sportswriters Association, Delaware Press Association, Philadelphia Press Association, New Jersey Associated Press Broadcasters Association, Communicator Awards, Society of Professional Journalists and College Broadcasters Incorporated. In 2013, he was named Broadcaster of the Year by Ballpark Digest for his work with the RailRiders' radio and TV broadcasts. In 2016, Baseball America named him one of the game's top broadcast prospects. He was twice named Delaware Sportscaster of the Year according to the National Sportscasters and Sportswriters Association.
