= Pat O'Brien (radio and television personality) =

American author and radio host

- Born: Patrick John O'Brien; February 14, 1948 (age 78); Sioux Falls, South Dakota, U.S.
- Education: University of South Dakota; Johns Hopkins University
- Occupations: Author, radio host
- Political party: Democratic
- Spouse: Linda O'Brien (m. 1973; div. 2004)
- Partner: Betsy Hoyt Stephens (2008–present)
- Children: 1

Patrick John O'Brien (born February 14, 1948) is an American author and radio host, best known for his work as a sportscaster with CBS Sports from 1981 to 1997, as well as his work as the anchor and host of Access Hollywood from 1997 to 2004, and The Insider from 2004 to 2008.

O'Brien covered six Olympic Games, two for CBS (1992 Winter and 1994) and four for NBC (2000, 2002, 2004 and 2012). He has also covered the World Series, Super Bowl, NBA Finals, and Final Four as a pregame host while at CBS.

He wrote the book Talkin' Sports: A B.S.-er's Guide, published in 1998, and released an autobiography, I'll Be Back Right After This, in 2014.

== Education ==
Pat O'Brien grew up in Sioux Falls, South Dakota. He attended Axtell Park Middle School before graduating from Washington High School in 1966. O'Brien received a degree in government from the University of South Dakota (where he was a member of the Delta Tau Delta fraternity) in 1970. He subsequently earned a master's degree in international economics from the Paul H. Nitze School of Advanced International Studies at Johns Hopkins University in Washington, D.C. O'Brien was a member of Sioux Falls area rock and roll band Dale Gregory and the Shouters, from 1964 to 1967 for which he was inducted into the South Dakota Rock and Roll Hall of Fame on April 25, 2010. Subsequent to the Shouters, he was the lead band personality in the local band Those of Us, a compilation of the Shouters and the X-Men.

== Career ==
=== Early career (1970–1981) ===
O'Brien started his career working for KSOO TV-Radio in his hometown of Sioux Falls. After graduating from college in 1970, he worked as a researcher at NBC News in Washington, D.C., and was a production assistant for The Huntley-Brinkley Report. He then served as an anchor and reporter for WMAQ-TV in Chicago. In 1977, he moved to KNXT-TV (now KCBS-TV) in Los Angeles, where he earned four local Emmy Awards.

=== CBS Sports (1981–1997) ===
Pat O'Brien is perhaps best known for his sixteen-year association with CBS Sports, which he joined in 1981. While at CBS, O'Brien covered the Super Bowl, World Series, NBA draft, NBA Finals, Winter Olympic Games, the NCAA men's basketball tournament, NCAA Football Championship and the Final Four. While at CBS he hosted the short-lived (3 weeks) late night talk show Overtime...With Pat O'Brien. He has also hosted VH1's Fairway to Heaven and Lift Ticket to Ride. In 1990, he was a regular on The NFL Today with Greg Gumbel, Terry Bradshaw and Lesley Visser.

=== Entertainment anchor (1997–2008) ===
From 1997 to 2004 he was the co-host of Access Hollywood. His co-hosts included Giselle Fernandez until 1999, and then Nancy O'Dell through 2004. He became the lead host of the Entertainment Tonight spin-off The Insider from its inception in 2004 until 2008.

=== Fox Sports Radio (2010–2013) ===
On August 18, 2010, O'Brien joined Steve Hartman and Vic "The Brick" Jacobs on the Loose Cannons show. Subsequently, Vic left the show and it was renamed Primetime on Fox Sports Radio, which could be heard from 3 p.m. to 7 pm. E.S.T. Throughout O'Brien's show, he was often condescending about a Los Angeles–based newspaper sports writer, Tom Hoffarth. A memo sent to some people at Sherman Oaks–based Fox Sports Radio with a new lineup for early 2014, changes that left Pat O'Brien and Steve Hartman without a show.

=== Other appearances ===
In 1997 O'Brien appeared as himself in Season 2 Episode 7 of Everybody Loves Raymond, titled Working Late Again. In 2000, O'Brien returned to the sports world when he covered the Summer Olympic Games in Sydney for NBC, appearing on the CNBC channel. He also covered the 2002 Winter Olympics in Salt Lake City, Utah appearing on MSNBC. He also anchored the 2004 Games in Athens, Greece for NBC, this time appearing on both the Network and MSNBC, and in 2012 anchors the tennis tournament coverage which will be carried on Bravo. In addition to the Olympics, he also hosted the late night edition of the 2006 U.S. Open Tennis Championships for CBS Sports which was his return to CBS after a 9-year hiatus.

In 2001, O'Brien had a cameo appearance in P. Diddy's Bad Boy for Life music video. In early 2003, Pat O'Brien filled in for Casey Kasem three times on Kasem's radio programs American Top 40 and American Top 20, once in January, once in February, and once in March when Kasem took vacation time. O'Brien also voice-acted in an episode of The Twilight Zone entitled "Mr. Motivation". His voice is used for a doll named "Mr. Motivation".

O'Brien has been parodied or targeted on shows like The Simpsons, Home Movies, The Howard Stern Show, South Park, The Soup, Late Night with Conan O'Brien, Best Week Ever, The Adam Carolla Show, The Opie and Anthony Show, The Boondocks, Cheap Seats, The Showbiz Show with David Spade, The Larry Sanders Show, and by Jimmy Fallon on Saturday Night Live. He was also the subject of a TV Funhouse cartoon by Robert Smigel. In 2005, O'Brien appeared on the Adult Swim program Robot Chicken, lampooning himself and his hosting of The Insider.

He was featured on the Adult Swim show Hot Package.

O'Brien made a cameo appearance in the 1998 comedy BASEketball as himself.

== Personal life ==
=== Family ===
In August 2004, O'Brien filed for divorce from Linda, his wife of three decades. They have a son named Sean.

In July 2008, O'Brien announced his engagement to his girlfriend of five years, Betsy Hoyt Stephens, a clothing and accessories designer.

O'Brien enrolled at the University of California, Los Angeles for addiction studies in 2014.

=== Alcoholism and voice-mail episode ===
On March 20, 2005, O'Brien issued a written statement announcing that he had been admitted to a rehabilitation facility for alcoholism. Around the announcement of O'Brien entering rehabilitation, a string of sexually graphic voice-mail messages that contained O'Brien's voice started to make the rounds, particularly within the Internet community and radio programs The Bubba the Love Sponge Show, The Wendy Williams Experience, The Howard Stern Show and The Opie and Anthony Show. The drunk dialing incident consisted primarily of O'Brien, in a state of arousal, repeatedly recording sexually graphic messages, complete with suggestions of drug use, on the cellular voicemail box of a woman who remains anonymous.

On May 4, 2005, O'Brien was interviewed by talk show therapist Phil McGraw, which was featured during a prime time special on CBS. He disclosed the reasons behind his alcohol and drug abuse since the 1960s, as well as his experiences during rehabilitation. O'Brien also expressed remorse for the voice-mail incident and apologized for what his substance abuse did to his family. O'Brien returned to The Insider the next day, and reports said that O'Brien had been signed to a new deal as host of the show.

On February 8, 2008, it was reported that O'Brien reentered rehabilitation and Donny Osmond would be "filling in" as the co-host of The Insider alongside Lara Spencer. On March 5, 2008, it was reported that O'Brien had been removed from The Insider, with Osmond taking his place. However, a month later O'Brien resumed his hosting duties after Osmond declined to take a permanent hosting role. On September 18, 2008, O'Brien was officially fired from The Insider for emails disparaging Spencer.

Media offices
Preceded by Jim Nantz	Studio Host of College Basketball on CBS; 1990–1997	Succeeded by Greg Gumbel
Preceded by Frank Gifford; Kathie Lee Gifford	Late Night Host of the Winter Olympic Games; 1992–1994	Succeeded by Michele Tafoya; Al Trautwig
Preceded by Giselle Fernández; Larry Mendte	Host of Access Hollywood; 1997–2004; Served alongside: Giselle Fernández, Nancy O'Dell	Succeeded by Billy Bush; Nancy O'Dell
