= Sonny Hill =

American basketball player and announcer

Personal information
- Born: July 22, 1936 (age 90) Philadelphia, Pennsylvania, U.S.
- Listed height: 5 ft 10 in (1.78 m)

Career information
- High school: Northeast (Philadelphia, Pennsylvania)
- College: Central State
- Playing career: 1958–1968
- Position: Guard
- Coaching career: 1967–1968, 1973–1974

Career history

Playing
- 1958–1959: Allentown Jets
- 1959–1960: Wilkes-Barre Barons
- 1960–1961: Sunbury Mercuries
- 1961–1962: Camden Bullets
- 1962–1963: Wilkes-Barre Barons
- 1964–1966: Sunbury Mercuries

Coaching
- 1967–1968: Binghamton Flyers
- 1973–1974: Hazleton Bullets

William Randolph "Sonny" Hill (born July 22, 1936) is an American former announcer. He is a member of the Philadelphia Sports Hall of Fame, and current sports radio personality in Philadelphia, Pennsylvania. He also serves as an executive advisor for the Philadelphia 76ers. He is known as Mr. Basketball and "The Mayor of Basketball" in Philadelphia for founding the eponymous Sonny Hill League and for his many contributions to the game.

== Biography ==
=== Early life ===
Hill was born and raised in Philadelphia. After graduating from Northeast High School in 1955, he attended college for two years and then joined the Eastern Professional Basketball League (EPBL). Hill played in the EPBL for the Allentown Jets, Wilkes-Barre Barons, Sunbury Mercuries and Camden Bullets from 1958 to 1968. He was the head coach of the Binghamton Flyers during the 1967–68 season and the Hazleton Bullets during the 1973–74 season. .

Hill is the father of filmmaker K. Brent Hill.

=== Broadcasting career ===
Hill began his broadcast career in 1969 as a color commentator with Andy Musser for the Philadelphia 76ers. He was also a commentator with the NBA on CBS from 1973 until 1977. He has hosted a weekly show on SportsRadio 94 WIP since 1987.

== The Sonny Hill League ==
The Sonny Hill Community Involvement League is an amateur summer basketball organization in the Delaware Valley. The league was founded in 1968 as a safe haven from gang warfare and other violence. The league, which began as an extension of the Charles Baker Memorial League, today consists of more than 60 teams serving more than 800 student athletes.

== Awards and honors ==
- Hill received the Mannie Jackson Human Spirit Award from the Naismith Memorial Basketball Hall of Fame in 2008.
