= Andraya Carter =

American journalist

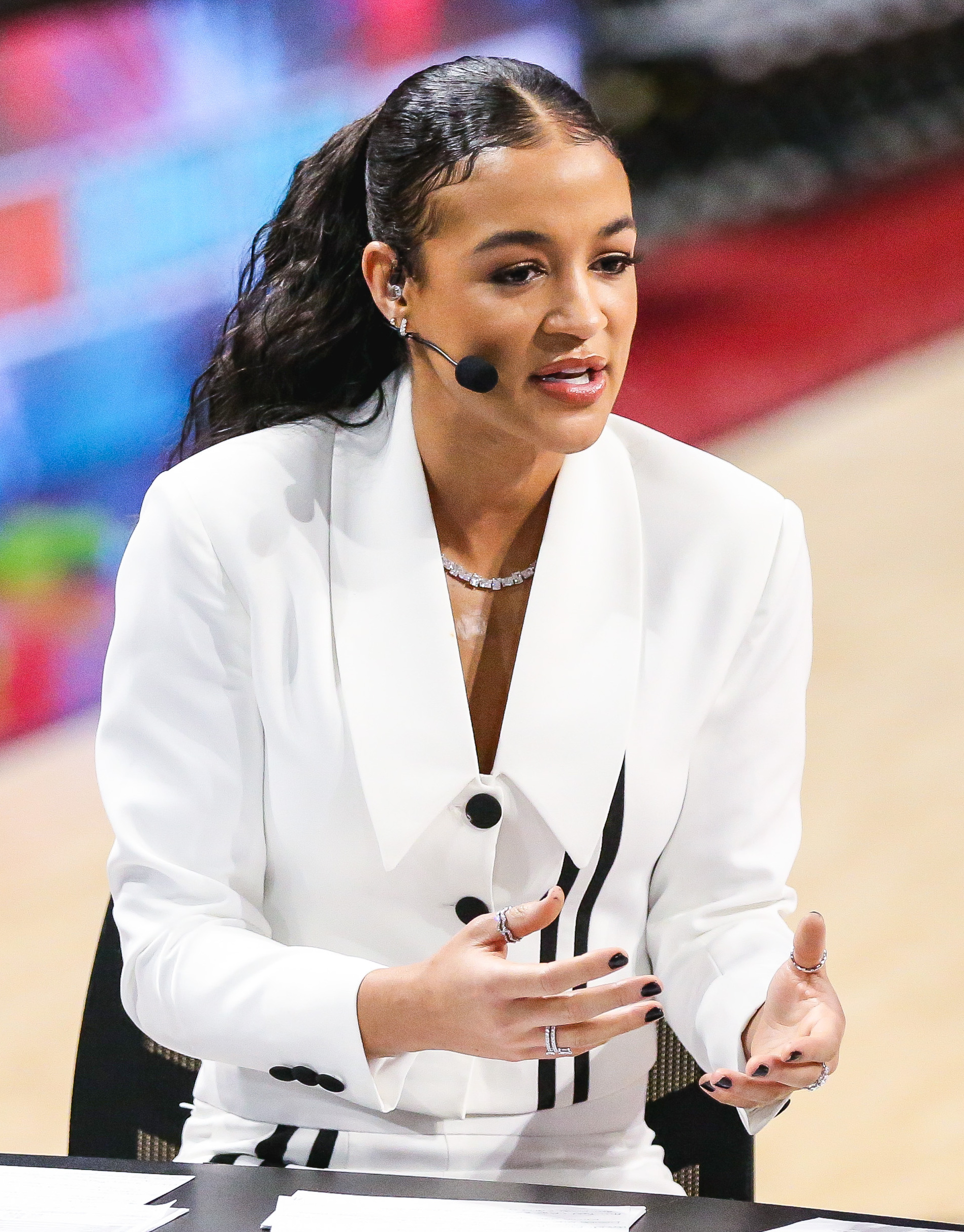
- Carter in 2025
- Born: November 12, 1993 (age 32); Flowery Branch, Georgia, U.S.
- Education: University of Tennessee
- Occupations: Analyst, co-host
- Employer(s): ESPN, SEC Network

Andraya Nichole Carter (born November 12, 1993) is an analyst and reporter for ESPN/SEC Network coverage of college basketball, college football, and the WNBA. She was a co-host for Out of Pocket with Alyssa Lang until 2023. She started working as a sideline reporter for the NBA on ESPN in 2023.

Carter played college basketball for the Tennessee Lady Volunteers.

== Early life and playing career ==
Carter was born in Flowery Branch, Georgia. She went to school and played basketball at Buford High School (Georgia) playing for the legendary coach Gene Durden, who also taught her multimedia presentations class.

She was one of the driving forces behind three straight Class 2A state championships for the Lady Wolves (2009–2011), averaging 13 points per game in those seasons. She ended up missing her senior season due to injuries. Despite this, she was still ranked the No. 21 prospect nationally by espnW.com for the class of 2012.

She accepted a scholarship to play for the Lady Volunteers |at the University of Tennessee. She was a fan of the Lady Vols and coach Pat Summitt prior to joining them. She was one of the last players to sign with Summitt. Carter played five games in the 2012–13 season before being redshirted due to injury. She was named to the SEC All-Freshmen Team for the 2013–14 season and led the conference in steals with 80 in the 2014–15 season. Mounting injuries forced her to retire after her redshirt junior season in 2015–16 ending her dreams of playing in the WNBA. Carter averaged 6.4 points per game and had 199 steals in her Vol Career.

Legend
GP	Games played	GS	Games started	MPG	Minutes per game	RPG	Rebounds per game
APG	Assists per game	SPG	Steals per game	BPG	Blocks per game	PPG	Points per game
TO	Turnovers per game	FG%	Field-goal percentage	3P%	3-point field-goal percentage	FT%	Free-throw percentage
**Bold**	Career best	°	League leader

=== College ===
Year	Team	GP	GS	MPG	FG%	3P%	FT%	RPG	APG	SPG	BPG	TO	PPG
2012–13	Tennessee	7	5	20.6	36.7	37.5	**90.0**	1.6	1.9	1.3	0.1	1.4	5.3
2013–14	Tennessee	35	21	26.3	**45.7**	**39.4**	69.2	2.7	**2.3**	1.6	0.2	1.4	6.9
2014–15	Tennessee	35	**31**	**30.0**	38.9	34.1	67.9	**3.1**	2.1	**2.3**	**0.4**	**1.3**	**7.7**
2015–16	Tennessee	**36**	25	26.2	35.8	25.4	80.0	2.3	1.7	1.5	0.3	1.7	4.8
**Career**		113	82	27.1	40.0	33.8	72.9	2.6	2.0	1.8	0.3	1.5	6.4
Statistics retrieved from Sports-Reference.

== Broadcasting career ==
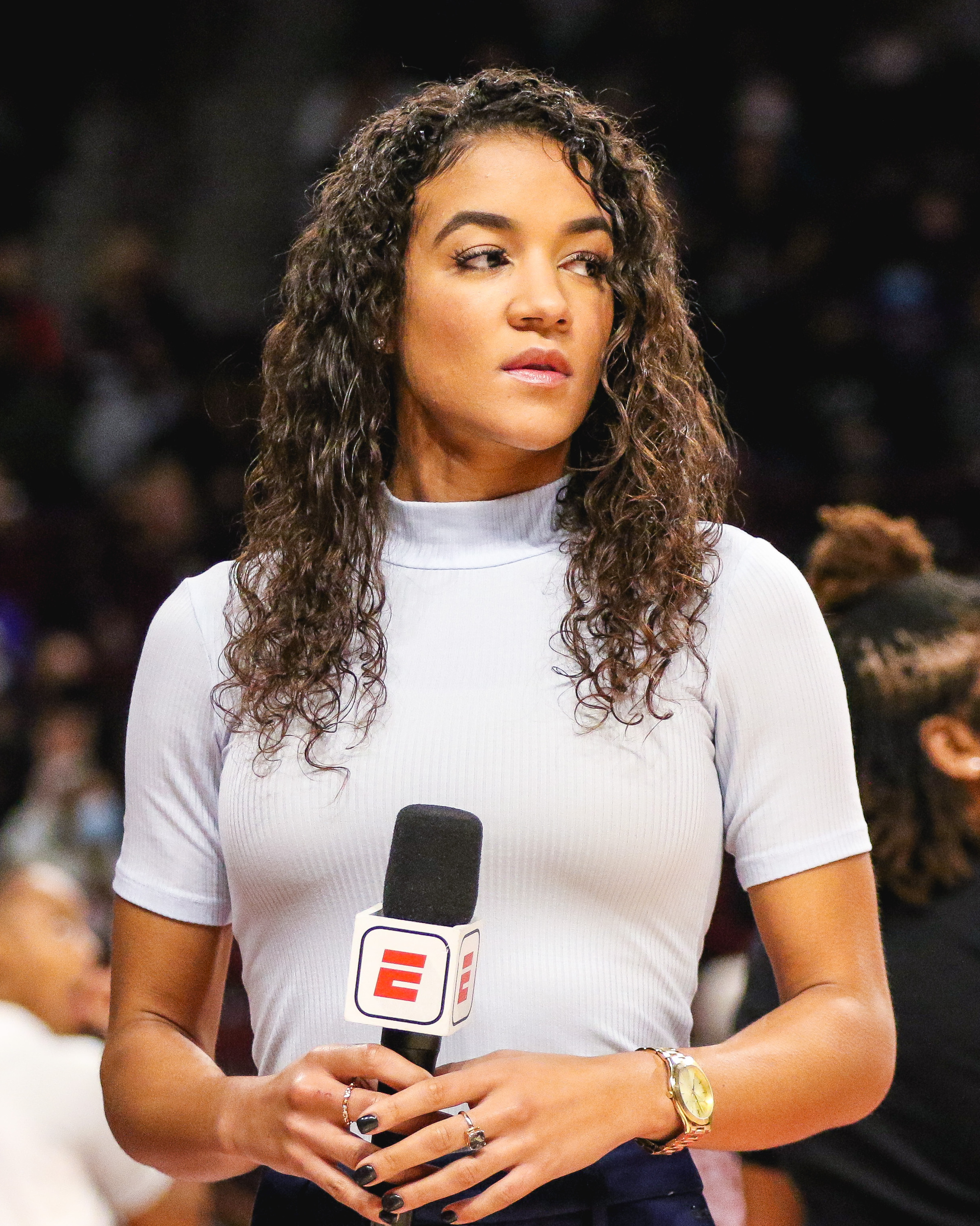
Carter reporting for ESPN at a college basketball game in 2021

In 2016 after ending her basketball career, she was looking for what to do after basketball when she was approached on campus by "The Vol For Life" production team about calling Tennessee basketball games online for ESPN3. Carter was given some games the following season, which led to a seasonal contract. She attended LaChina Robinson's Rising Media Stars media boot camp for women. She also covered the NBA G League as an analyst, and worked as an Orange Theory (fitness center) instructor. In 2022, she was named a sideline reporter for SEC Network's coverage of college football.

In 2024, Carter was an ESPN basketball analyst for the Women's Final Four along with Chiney Ogwumike and Elle Duncan. The women's NCAA championship game was the most-watched women's basketball game on record and drew a bigger television audience than the men's title game for the first time, with an average of 18.9 million viewers watching undefeated South Carolina beat Iowa and Caitlin Clark. The trio were called "the big three" on social media due to their impact on the growth of women's basketball.
