= Krista Blunk =

American sports broadcaster

Krista Lee Blunk acts as a play-by-play broadcaster or an analyst for Pac-12 Network, Westwood One, CBS Sports Network and ESPN covering women's soccer, volleyball, softball, and basketball, and, as of November 2024, men's college basketball. In addition to the networks above, she has been a sideline reporter for college football on Versus and done play-by-play or analysis duties for The Mtn., FSN, CSTV, Sacramento Monarchs games on Comcast SportsNet Bay Area, Team USA Olympics, and WNBA games on Oxygen.

== Early life and college ==
Krista Blunk's life in sports started early on. She attended high school at Tell City High School where she was a three-sport athlete, including basketball and volleyball. While Blunk's numbers aren't currently known, her stats earned her a full-ride scholarship to the University of Evansville. Blunk would later be inducted into the Tell City High School Hall of Fame.

Krista Blunk played collegiate basketball with the Evansville Purple Aces women's basketball team from 1990 to 1994. While at Evansville, Blunk would start all four seasons, scoring 1,123 points (which ranks 12th all-time) and 113 3-pointers (which ranks eighth). During her senior season, Blunk was named the NCAA "Sportswoman of the Year" recipient for her athletic and academic achievements. Blunk would graduate from Evansville with honors in telecommunications.

While Blunk has moved away from playing basketball, her playing days are not forgotten. In addition to being inducted into the Tell City High School Hall-of-Fame, Blunk was inducted into the Indiana Basketball Hall of Fame 2014 Silver Anniversary team.

== Professional career ==
After graduation Blunk decided to play professionally. Blunk would play overseas for N.S.W Australia from 1994 to 1995 before returning to the states to play for the Kentucky Marauders of the WBA in 1996.

After the 1996 season Blunk left the WBA and returned to Evansville and became a sports anchor and producer for WEVV and WFIE. While she wouldn't remain a full year, the experience launched her broadcasting career. Blunk left the stations to join the Golden State Warriors pre and post-game shows later that year. One year later Blunk would leave the Warriors to become the voice of the San Jose Lasers (1997–99), Stanford Cardinal women's basketball (1997–99), and the Sacramento Monarchs (1997–2009). In 1999 Blunk joined ESPN and Westwood One and became an analyst for the NCAA Women's Basketball Championships and other sports. Blunk remains working for ESPN and Westwood One today.
