= Debbie Antonelli =

American college basketball analyst

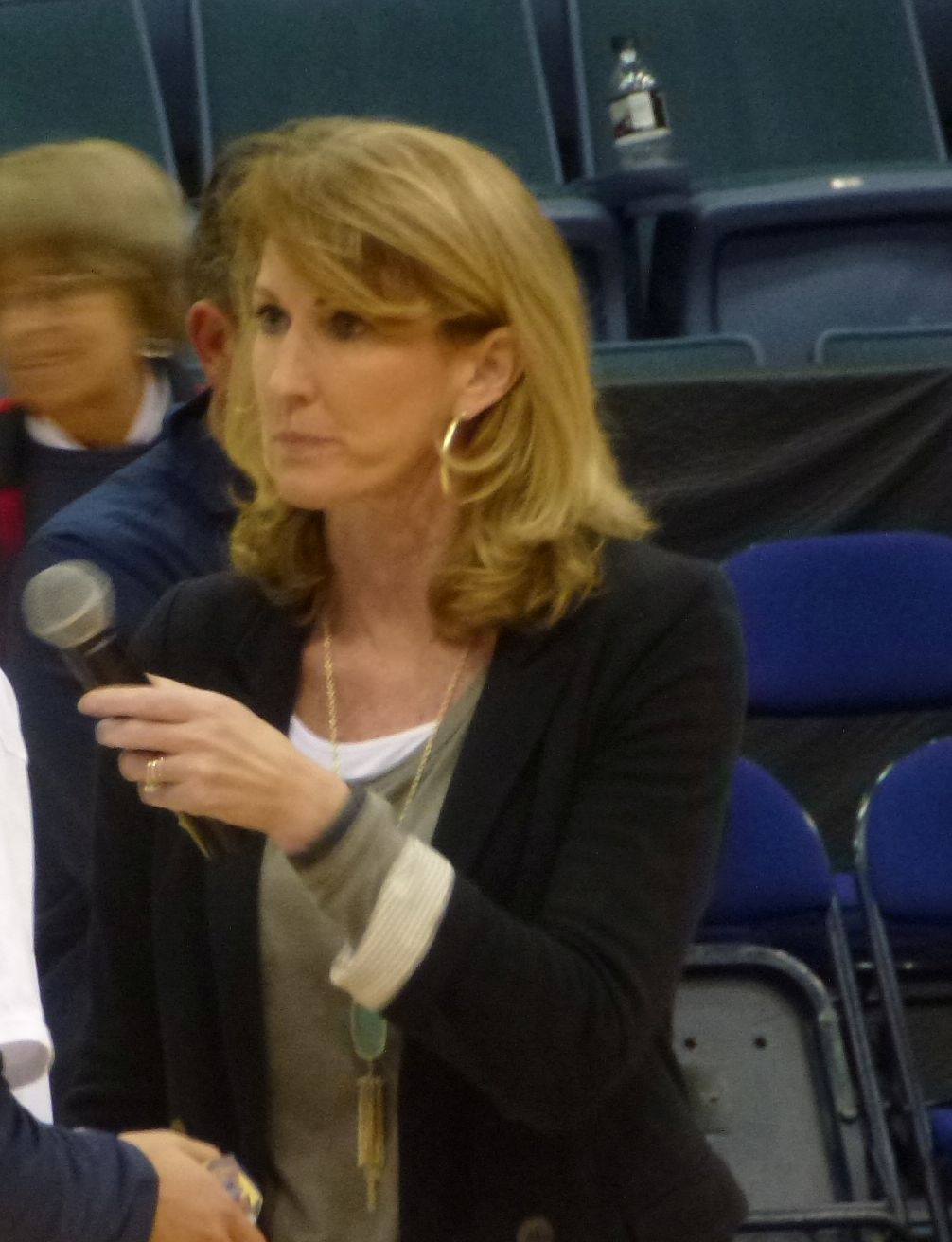
- Born: Deborah Lynn Mulligan; September 1, 1964 (age 62); Fayetteville, North Carolina, U.S.
- Occupation: Sports analyst

Debbie Antonelli (born September 1, 1964) is an American college basketball analyst and former player who works for ESPN, Big Ten Network, CBS, FOX, and Westwood One. She also does WNBA games for ESPN and NBATV, and has been the main play-by-play voice of the Indiana Fever since its inception in 2000.

== Early life and playing career ==
Antonelli was raised in Cary, North Carolina, and attended Cary High School. From 1982 to 1986, Antonelli played forward at North Carolina State University for coach Kay Yow, starting in three of those seasons. During her time at NC State, the Wolfpack made the NCAA Tournament four times and appeared in the Sweet Sixteen twice.

== Coaching and administration ==
After graduating from NC State, Antonelli moved on to Ohio University, where she spent the next year getting a master's degree in sports administration. While at Ohio, she served as the women's basketball student assistant coach. After obtaining her Master's from Ohio, Antonelli spent the next four years as director of marketing at the University of Kentucky before moving on to a similar role at Ohio State University.

== Broadcast career ==
When Antonelli arrived at Ohio State as director of marketing, Ohio State did not have any televised women's sports. Antonelli arranged a deal with a local station to air eight women's games per season, gathered the needed sponsors to produce those games, and as a bonus, became the play-by-play voice for those games. She announced Ohio State women's games for five years while also serving as an analyst for Dayton Flyers men's basketball games for three years. In 1995, after birth of her first child, Antonelli settled her mind on sports broadcasting, and shortly thereafter, she would sign on as a full-time broadcaster.

ESPN and CSTV eventually hired Antonelli as an analyst for select games; and the work would continue to grow. To this date Antonelli continues to broadcast through the Elite Eight for ESPN's NCAA Women's Tournament coverage. Additionally, Westwood One would hire her to be the analyst for their Final Four broadcasts; a position she has held since 2000. In 2007, she won the Women's Basketball Coaches Association Mel Greenberg Media Award which recognizes a member of the media who has best displayed a commitment to women's basketball and to advancing the role of the media in promoting the women's game. On June 11, 2022, Debbie was inducted into the Women's Basketball Hall of Fame.

Antonelli calls women's games in the Big Ten Conference for BTN Mondays. Saturdays are spent calling Conference USA or Big 12 Conference games for FSN. Sundays are with ACC Regional or ESPN calling an ACC or SEC game; and some Tuesdays and Wednesdays are with CBS Sports Network calling games for the American Athletic Conference or the Patriot League. She also serves as one of the three analysts calling games for College Basketball on CBS's January Saturday women's triple header.

Antonelli has a widespread workload during the basketball season and is in her 30th year. In November and December, she typically calls one to three games per week. Her broadcast duties include South Carolina Gamecocks and Tennessee Lady Volunteers games on Fox Sports South. Once January hits, Antonelli broadcasts three to five games each week.

== Personal life ==
Antonelli married her husband Frank on April 25, 1992. The couple currently lives in Mount Pleasant, South Carolina. They have three children, including Francis Marion Patriots basketball player Patrick. During the offseason, Antonelli provides basketball camps and clinics for the local community. Her family also run the foundation "Frankie and Friends," named after their son Frankie (who has Down syndrome); its main purpose is to stop bullying in schools. Antonelli's achievements as a fundraiser for the Coach Yow Stop Cancer Fund and Special Olympics were highlighted in a TV segment on "the Rise" in November 2022.
