= The Notch =

The Notch may refer to:

== Military ==
- The Post-Attack Command and Control System Facility, Hadley, Massachusetts, United States (historic)

== Places ==
- The Notch (Longs Peak), a rock gap on Longs Peak, Colorado, United States
- The Notch (Rock Mountain), a mountain pass in the San Juan Mountains of Colorado, United States
- The Notch (Madison County, Montana), a mountain pass in Madison County, Montana, United States
- The Notch (San Juan County, Utah), a mountain pass in San Juan County, Utah, United States
- The Notch (Summit County, Utah), a mountain pass in Summit County, Utah, United States
- The Granby Notch, a portion of Massachusetts that juts into Connecticut near Granby, part of Connecticut from 1774–1804
