= Matthew Laflin =

American businessman

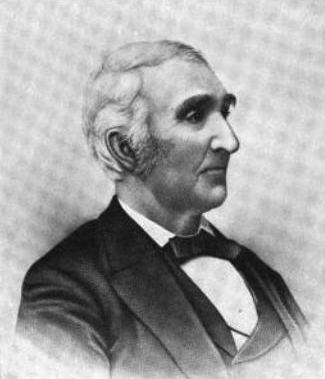
- Born: December 16, 1803; Southwick, Massachusetts, US
- Died: May 20, 1897 (aged 93); Chicago, Illinois, US
- Burial place: Rosehill Cemetery
- Occupations: Businessmen, philanthropist, and a pioneer of Chicago, Illinois
- Spouses: Henrietta Armenia Hinman; Catherine King
- Children: George Hinman Laflin; Georgina Laflin; Lycurgis Laflin

Matthew Laflin (December 16, 1803 – May 20, 1897) was an American manufacturer of gunpowder, businessman, philanthropist, and an early pioneer of Chicago, Illinois.

== Biography ==
=== Early life and ancestors ===
He was born on December 16, 1803, an American of Ulster Scots and early New England ancestry, at the Laflin-Phelps Homestead in Southwick, Hampden County, Massachusetts. He was the son of Matthew Laflin, a gunpowder manufacturer and Lydia Rising, the daughter of Amos Rising. He was the grandson of Matthew Laflin and Lucy Loomis and his great-grandfather, Charles Laflin, migrated to the US in 1740 from Ulster, Ireland settling at Oxford, Worcester County, Massachusetts. Charles Laflin and his family were living at Oxford, Massachusetts, when he purchased land in 1749 in the Southern (South-) village (-wick) part of the town of Westfield, Massachusetts. After manufacturing saltpeter for the Massachusetts militia during the American Revolutionary War, he built a powder mill in Southwick, Massachusetts, and the family successfully entered the explosives business.

=== Marriage and family ===
He married in 1827 at Canton, Connecticut, Henrietta Armenia Hinman, the daughter of Ransom Hinman and Mary Battele. She was born in Lee, Berkshire County, Massachusetts, on June 20, 1805, and died on February 12, 1834, in Canton, Hartford County, Connecticut. Matthew and Henrietta were the parents of three children. He married secondly, before 1837, Catherine King of Westfield, Massachusetts. She died in Chicago, Illinois, in 1891.

Their son, George H. Laflin, was born on July 19, 1828, at Canton, Connecticut. He died on July 24, 1904, at Pittsfield, Berkshire, Massachusetts. He married on September 3, 1851, at Pittsfield, Berkshire County, Massachusetts, Mary Minerva Brewster, who was born at Lenox, Massachusetts on January 24, 1832, and died at Chicago, Illinois on January 10, 1902. She was the daughter of Dr. John Milton Brewster and Philena Higley.

Their daughter Georgina, a twin of George H., died as an infant. Their youngest son was Lycurgus Laflin. He was born June 2, 1832, in Canton, Connecticut. He died on February 25, 1900, in Old Pt Comfort, Elizabeth Cty County, Virginia.

=== Career ===
He learned the trade from his father, also named Matthew Laflin, a manufacturer of gunpowder. He was attracted to Chicago because of the construction of the Illinois and Michigan Canal and hoped to sell gunpowder to the construction company. He quickly found a market for his product. The opening of the Illinois and Michigan Canal in 1848 allowed shipping from the Great Lakes through Chicago to the Mississippi River and the Gulf of Mexico. He relocated his family to Chicago in 1837 and his first home in Chicago was at Fort Dearborn, because no other shelter could be found in the young city.

With the money he made in the gunpowder business, he began to purchase large tracts of real estate and once owned 140 acres (0.57 km^{2}) of land within the city limits. He bought the land for $300 and lived to see it worth millions. In 1849, he purchased 100 acres (0.40 km^{2}) of land on the west side, extending eastward from Madison Street and Ogden Avenue. Here he built the Bull's Head Hotel, resort for men in the cattle business. The hotel was constructed complete with barns, sheds and cattle pens and so established Chicago's first stock yards. After its heyday, the hotel was used as an asylum for alcoholics before being torn down.

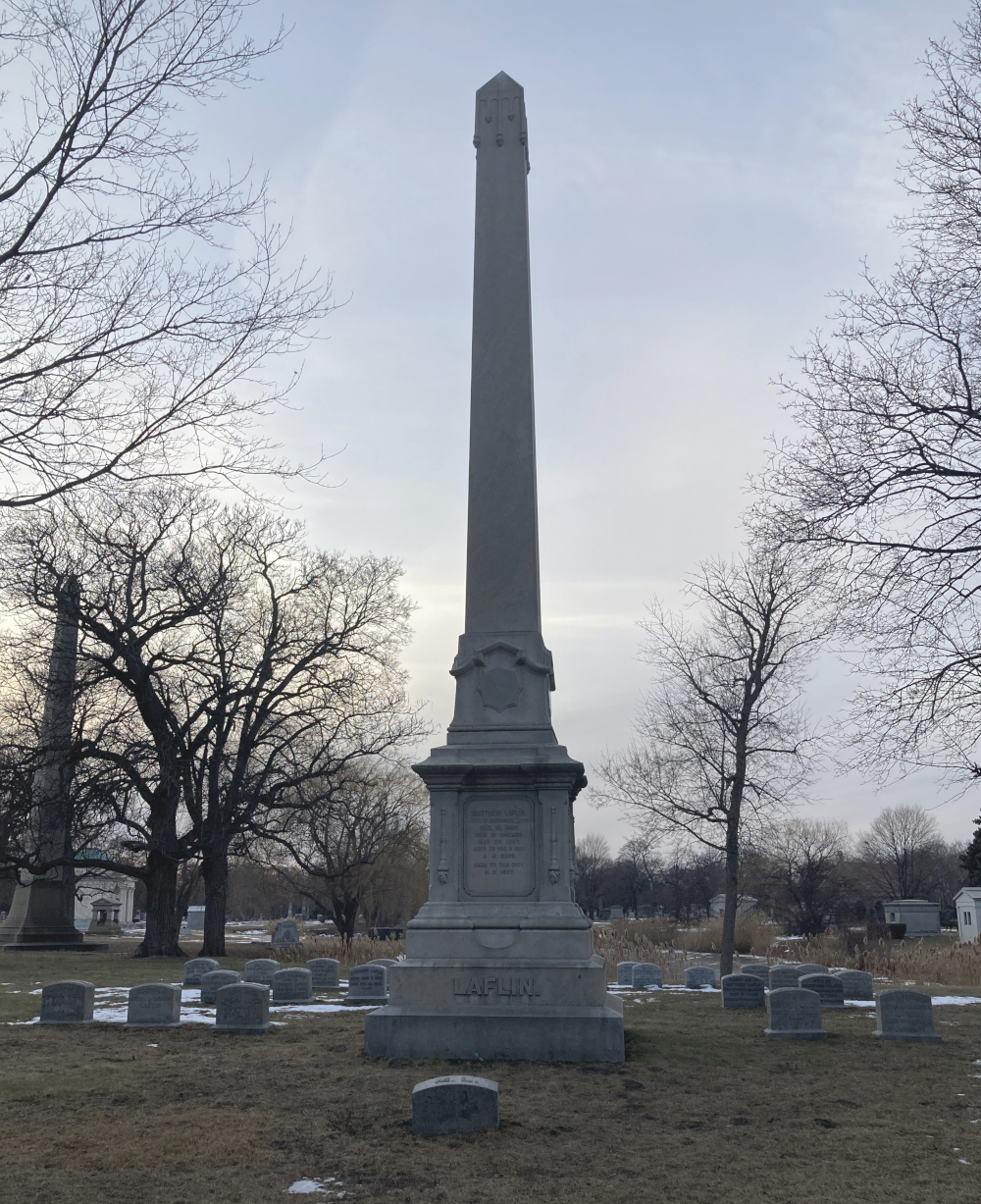
Laflin's grave at Rosehill Cemetery

In 1867, he refinanced the Elgin Watch Company when it was on the verge of failure, and became one of the largest stockholders in the company. The Laflin family sat on Elgin's board of directors for more than 70 years. It was his capital and enterprise that laid the foundation for Waukesha as a famous Wisconsin watering resort and he was the proprietor of the grand resort, the Fountain Spring House. Waukesha was once known for its extremely clean and good-tasting spring water and was called a "spa town." This earned the city the nicknames, "Spring City," and "Saratoga of the West." In the summer of 1905 the Fountain Spring House was sold by the heirs of Matthew Laflin to the Metropolitan Church Association of Chicago.

He built one of the first plank roads, known in those days as the Blue Island toll road. He operated the first omnibus line to carry his hotel patrons to his stock yards and the State Street markets. He also established the first water works system in Chicago by building a pine-log reservoir at Lake Street and the lake shore. Water funneled into the reservoir was distributed through wooden pipes to the city. During the Civil War, he was a Union Democrat. Laflin was also a founding member of the Chicago Board of Trade.

He died in Chicago on May 20, 1897, and was buried at Rosehill Cemetery.

=== Honors and legacy ===
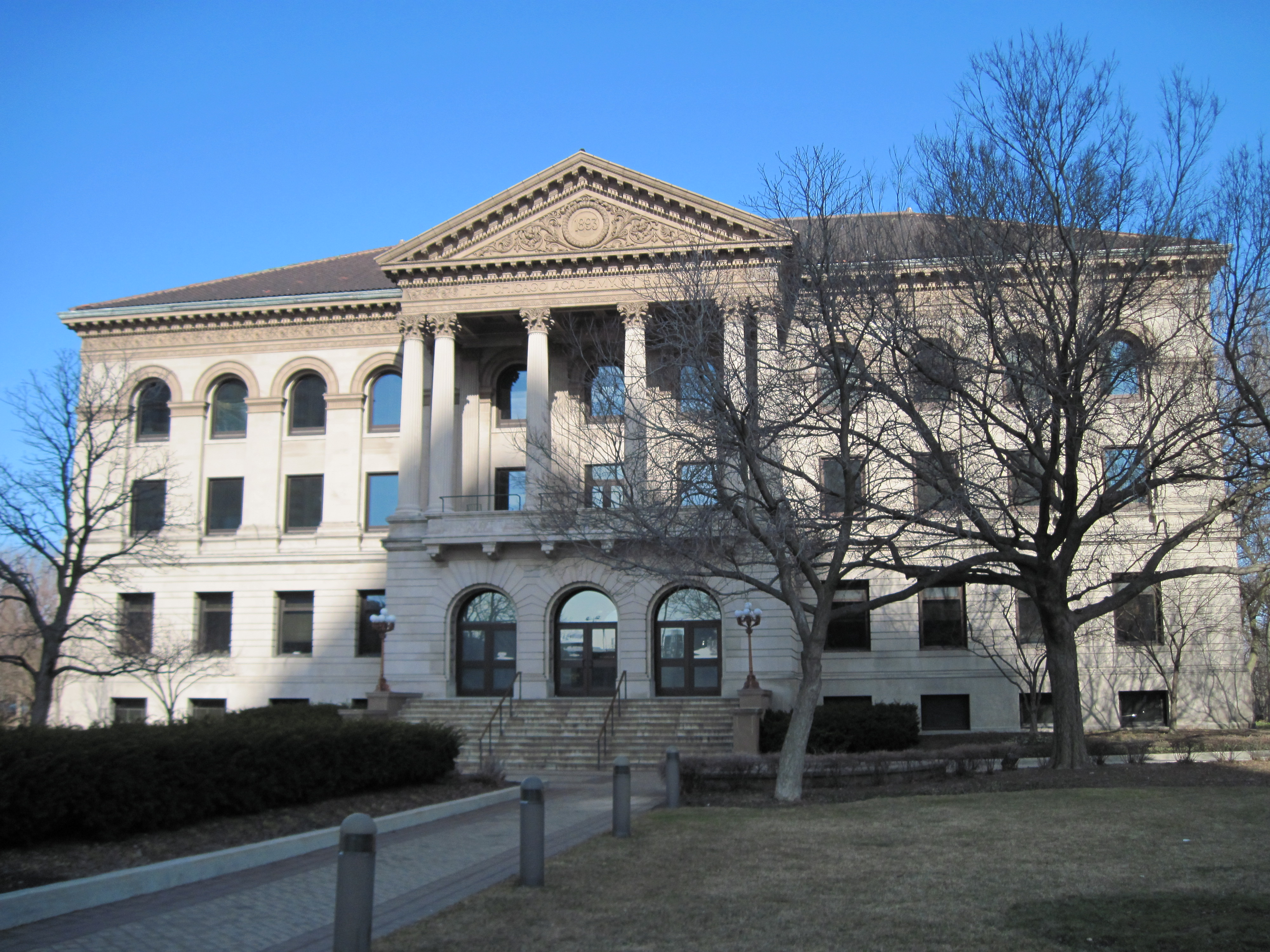
Matthew Laflin Memorial Building in Chicago

In 1892, Laflin made a lasting contribution to Chicago by donating $75,000 toward the building of a structure to house the Chicago Academy of Sciences, a scholarly society formed to promote the scientific investigation of natural history. As a result of Laflin's gift, the Academy of Sciences was granted a plot of land in Lincoln Park; the Lincoln Park Board of Commissioners then donated $25,000 in public funds to assure adequate financing for the project.

The building opened as the Matthew Laflin Memorial on October 31, 1894, and housed the academy until 1995 when it moved to a new building. The building reverted to the Chicago Park District, which rehabbed it into Lincoln Park Zoo administrative offices.

Laflin Street in Chicago begins 1500 West from 356 North to 12258 South, it is named in his honor.

=== Descendants ===
Matthew Laflin Rockwell (1915–1988) was an American architect and director of planning for the U.S. Army Corps of Engineers and responsible for the site selection, plan and design of O'Hare International Airport. He is a cousin of Sylvester "Pat" Laflin Weaver, actress Sigourney Weaver and comedian and actor Doodles Weaver. He is also the grandson of Francis Williams Rockwell, a United States representative from Massachusetts and the great-grandson of Julius Rockwell, a United States politician from Massachusetts.
