= Southwick Regional School =

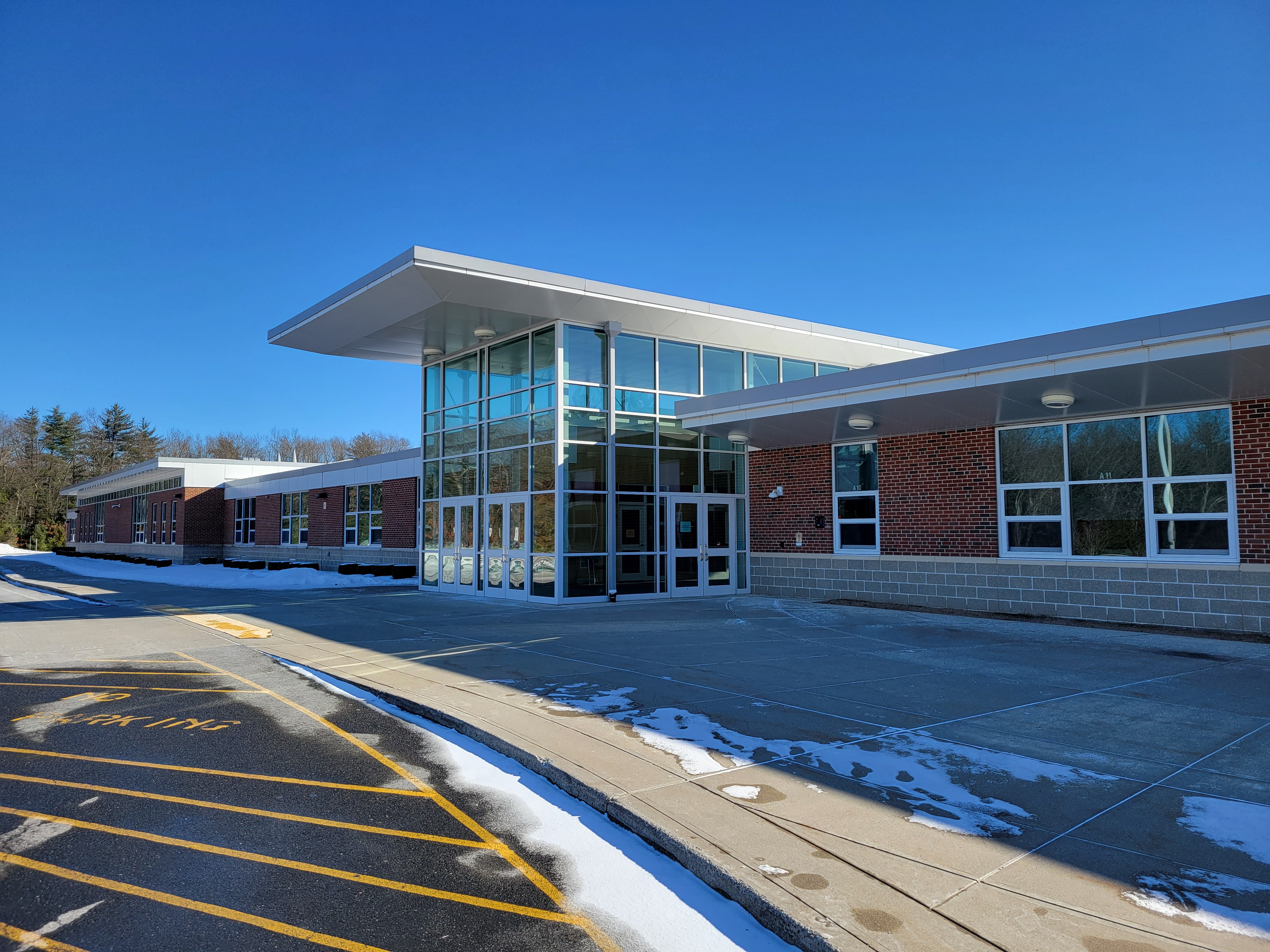
- Southwick Regional School

Location
- 93 Feeding Hills Road; Southwick, Hampden County, MA 01077; United States
- Coordinates: 42.0605°N 72.7473°W

Information
- Type: Public; Open enrollment
- Established: 1971
- School district: Southwick-Tolland-Granville Regional School District
- Superintendent: Jennifer Willard
- Principal: Dr. Diana Bonneville
- Teaching staff: 45 (2015)
- Grades: 7–12
- Enrollment: 614 (2023-2024)
- Hours in school day: 6 hours, 35 minutes
- Campus: Suburban
- Colors: Green and gold
- Slogan: Rams Belong
- Athletics conference: MIAA Division 3
- Mascot: Ram
- Team name: Rams
- Rival: Hampshire Regional
- Accreditation: NEASC
- Communities served: Southwick, Tolland, Granville

Southwick Regional School (SRS) is a public high school in Southwick, Massachusetts, United States serving grades 7–12 of the Southwick-Tolland-Granville Regional School District, which is made up of the towns of Southwick, Tolland, and Granville.

== Performance ==
Southwick Regional School was assessed by the New England Association of Schools and Colleges in 2004.

The school meets all requirements of the federal No Child Left Behind Act.

== Sports ==
STGRSD is active in interscholastic sports.

Rebecca Lobo, a former WNBA player, was a graduate of Southwick Regional School and held a state scoring record of 2,710 points, while in high school.

Southwick does not have a football team. The School added a Junior Varsity Hockey team prior to the 2016–2017 school year.

== Racism incidents ==
In February 2024, multiple allegations of incidents of racism surfaced from several students from the school, including multiple racist remarks from students, several incidents involving racist bullying, with one allegedly involving a student saying the n-word, and an alleged slave auction on Snapchat where students could bet on using students of color as slaves, leading to the NAACP filing a complaint against the school, demanding the school to launch an investigation over the incidents.

=== Response from school ===
After the allegations surfaced, the school launched an investigation into the incidents, which ended on the 16th of February. Administrators made apologies to the victims and their families, but did not identify any plan for changing the schools culture and environment in a way that will reduce the likelihood of future hate crimes. They were criticised by the NAACP for this, which has filed complaints with the state and other agencies that are still ongoing as of September 2024.

== Notable alumni ==
- Rebecca Lobo, women's professional WNBA basketball player
