= Bilqis Abdul-Qaadir =

American Basketball player

- Born: November 11, 1990 (age 35); Springfield, Massachusetts, U.S.
- Education: University of Memphis; Indiana State University; New Leadership Charter School (Springfield, Massachusetts)
- Height: 5 ft 4 in (163 cm)

Bilqis Abdul-Qaadir (Somali: Bilqis Abdul Qaadir; Arabic: بلقيس عبد القادر) (born 11 November 1990) is an American former collegiate basketball player. She was notable for playing basketball while wearing a hijab, a headscarf for Muslim women.

Abdul-Qaadir scored 3,070 points in her high school career, setting the all-time scoring record in Massachusetts. She played four years of college basketball for the University of Memphis. She finished her college basketball career at Indiana State University, where she later served as a graduate assistant with the team.

== Early life and high school career ==
Abdul-Qaadir was born in Springfield, Massachusetts, on November 11, 1990, to Tariq and Alooah Abdul-Qaadir. Her brother Yusuf Abdul-Ali played basketball for Bentley College and helped lead his school to two NCAA Division II Final Four appearances.

From a young age, Abdul-Qaadir and her cousins Barakah and Vanessa all knew she wanted basketball to be a part of her life. After first picking up a ball at the age of four at a local YMCA, her love for the game grew. Growing up in a practicing Muslim household, Abdul-Qaadir was to follow her religious beliefs as she grew older. She began wearing a headscarf, a traditional head covering for Muslim women, and practiced modesty on the court by covering all skin except her hands.

Abdul-Qaadir began playing varsity basketball in eighth grade at New Leadership Charter School. She reached 1,000 career points as a freshman, only the third player in Massachusetts history to do so (joining Rebecca Lobo and Kelsey O'Keefe). She finished her high school career with 3,070 points, surpassing Lobo's previous record of 2,740. Lobo played one more year of high school basketball than Abdul-Qaadir, with Lobo starting her varsity career in seventh grade.

Abdul-Qaadir was named 2009 Massachusetts Gatorade Player of the Year, averaging 42 points per game as a senior. In her final game in high school, Abdul-Qaadir scored 51 of her team's 56 points in a regional loss. She graduated from New Leadership Charter School as an honor student.

== College ==
Abdul-Qaadir's received a full scholarship to the University of Memphis where she played four years (2009–13). She graduated magna cum laude from Memphis with a degree in exercise science. While playing at Memphis, her teammates called her by the nickname Qisi.

As a freshman, Abdul-Qaadir tore her anterior cruciate ligament in the preseason and was redshirted for the 2009–2010 season. The following 2010–2011 season, she played in 34 games and averaged 3.9 points per game and 1.3 rebounds per game. This season marked the first time in NCAA history that a player played in a hijab. Abdul-Qaadir was awarded the United States Basketball Writers Association “Most Courageous” award at the NCAA Women's Final Four for being recognized as the first Muslim woman to play covered in NCAA history. She was also invited to the White House and was acknowledged by President Barack Obama for being the first Muslim woman to play covered in collegiate basketball.

In her 2011–2012 season, Abdul-Qaadir upped her scoring from 3.9 to 7.8 points per game and became the third Tiger point guard to record over 100 assists in a single season. She set a team record by making 26 consecutive free throws in the regular season.

In the 2012–2013 season, Abdul-Qaadir only played in 25 games, due to breaking her wrist early in the season. She averaged 10.6 points per game and 3.2 rebounds per game.

After graduating from the University of Memphis, Abdul-Qaadir used her final season of eligibility at Indiana State University. She was named Conference Outstanding Newcomer for the 2013–2014 season, and helped lead the Sycamores to the Missouri Valley Conference title. Abdul-Qaadir ranks 10th all-time on the team for single-season points scored (454), was also named First Team All-MVC, Second Team Scholar-Athlete, and earned a combined seven conference Player, Newcomer, and Scholar-Athlete of the Week awards. In the 2014–2015 season, Abdul-Qaadir worked as a graduate assistant on the Indiana State women's basketball staff.

=== Memphis and Indiana State statistics ===
Legend
GP	Games played	GS	Games started	MPG	Minutes per game
FG%	Field goal percentage	3P%	3-point field goal percentage	FT%	Free throw percentage
RPG	Rebounds per game	APG	Assists per game	SPG	Steals per game
BPG	Blocks per game	PPG	Points per game	**Bold**	Career high

Year	Team	GP	Points	FG%	3P%	FT%	RPG	APG	SPG	BPG	PPG
2009-10	Memphis	Medical redshirt									
2010-11	Memphis	**34**	131	33.1%	18.8%	78.7%	1.3	1.2	0.8	0.1	3.9
2011-12	Memphis	33	258	38.9%	32.4%	72.7%	**3.2**	3.4	**2.4**	0.1	7.8
2012-13	Memphis	25	265	39.0%	**38.6%**	**84.3%**	3.2	2.5	2.2	**0.2**	10.6
2013-14	Indiana State	32	**454**	**39.6%**	30.7%	77.3%	2.8	**4.4**	1.9	0.1	**14.2**
Career		124	1108	38.5%	32.4%	77.9%	2.6	2.9	1.8	0.1	8.9

== Post-college ==
Abdul-Qaadir's hopes were to continue playing professionally in Europe, but were quickly diminished when she was informed of the rule from the International Basketball Federation (FIBA) that prohibits headgear larger than five inches. Unwilling to stray in her beliefs, Abdul-Qaadir has stood up to the international rules, petitioning for an exemption to the rule. She put her dreams of playing professionally aside as she works to now pave a way for other Muslim women in sports. FIBA eventually ruled in her favor in 2017.

Abdul-Qaadir started an online campaign called “Muslim Girls Hoop Too” to raise awareness for Muslim women in sports with an emphasis on female basketball players. She hopes to use the organization to travel the world to empower young women to stay true to themselves while using physical activity and basketball as a platform. Through her campaign, Abdul-Qaadir was once again invited to the White House in March 2015 for the Muslim Leaders Meeting as one of 15 representatives that met with President Obama and his senior officials. That experience led her to an invitation to the 2015 White House Easter Egg Roll where she was able to raise awareness for physical activity under the First Lady's “Let’s Move” campaign.

Abdul-Qaadir resides in London, Ontario, with her husband, Abdulwaahid Massey, and son, where they own a basketball training gym.

== Awards ==
- 2009 Massachusetts Gatorade Player of the Year
- Western Massachusetts Player of the Year
- Boston Globe All-Dream Team
- Massachusetts Scoring
- ESPN High School National Honor Roll
- Graduated first in her class
- C-USA Commissioner's Honor Roll (2010, 2011, 2012)
- Tiger 3.0 Club (2009, 2010. 2011, Fall 2012)
- Dean's List (Fall 2009, Fall 2011, Fall 2012)
- C-USA Academic Medalist (2010)
- C-USA All-Academic Team (2013)

== Eid al-Fitr ==
In 2009 Abdul-Qaadir was invited to the White House by President Barack Obama for Eid al-Fitr. The president spoke about how much of an inspiration Abdul-Qaadir was, due to her being an honor student as well as an athlete, and how she was not only an inspiration to Muslim girls but an inspiration to everyone in the world today. He also joked and said how he wanted to play her in a game of 1-on-1.

== Closed-door White House meeting ==
On February 4, 2015, Abdul-Qaadir was one of 14 American Muslims invited to a closed-door meeting with President Barack Obama at the White House.
