= Southwick, Massachusetts =

- Town
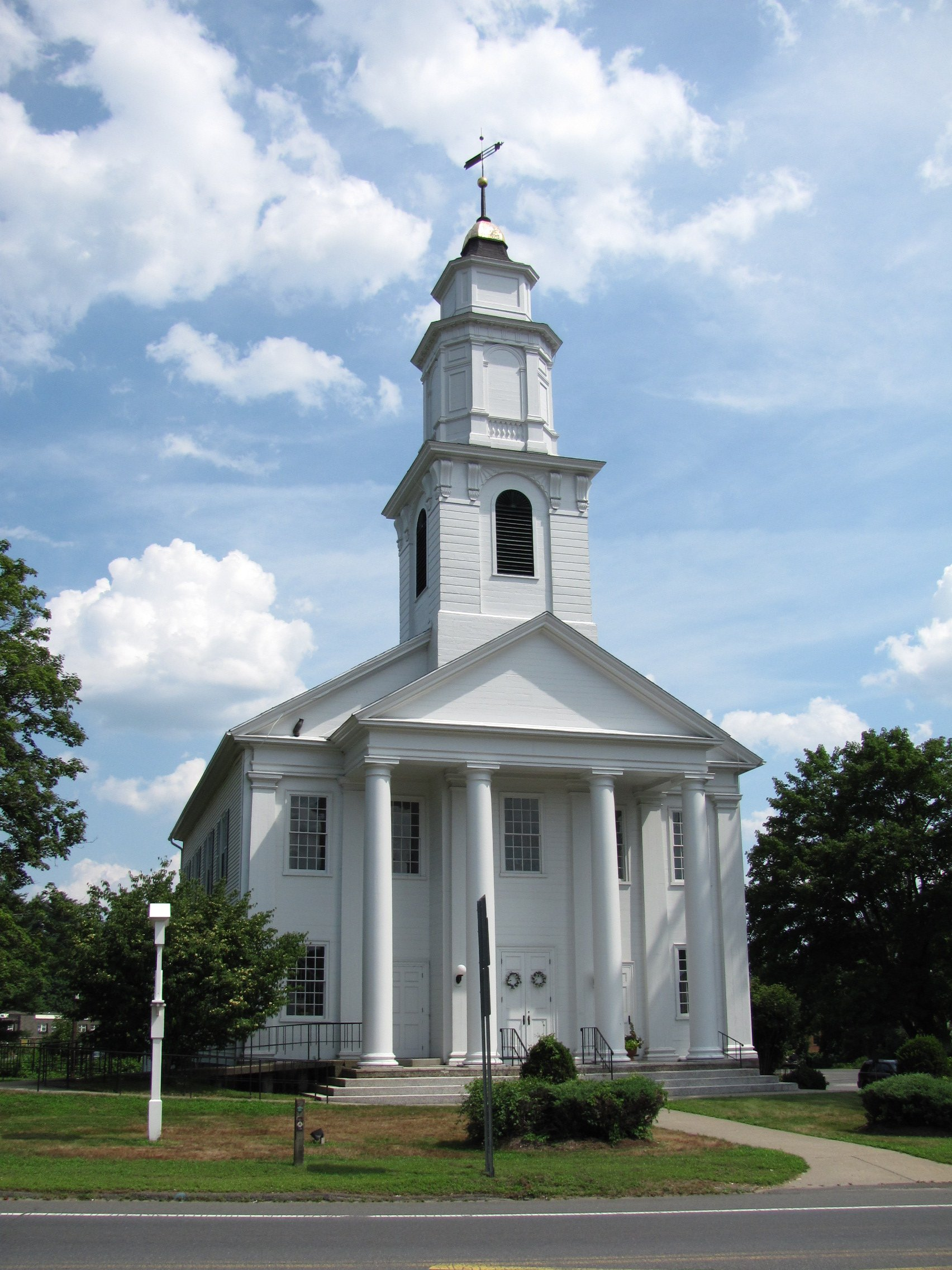
- Southwick Congregational Church

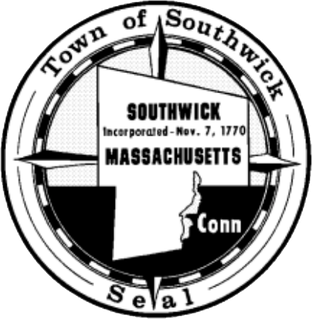
- Seal

- Location in Hampden County in Massachusetts
- Coordinates: 42°03′17″N 72°46′15″W
- Country: United States
- State: Massachusetts
- County: Hampden
- Settled: 1690
- Incorporated: November 7, 1770

Government
  - Type: Open town meeting, Board of selectmen

Area
  - Total: 31.7 sq mi (82.0 km^{2})
  - Land: 30.8 sq mi (79.8 km^{2})
  - Water: 0.85 sq mi (2.2 km^{2})
- Elevation: 243 ft (74 m)

Population (2020)
  - Total: 9,232
  - Density: 300/sq mi (116/km^{2})
- Time zone: UTC−5 (Eastern)
  - Summer (DST): UTC−4 (Eastern)
- ZIP Code: 01077
- Area code: 413
- FIPS code: 25-65825
- GNIS feature ID: 0618191
- Website: www.southwickma.org

Southwick is a town in Hampden County, Massachusetts, United States. The population was 9,232 at the 2020 census, down from 9,502 at the 2010 census. It is part of the Springfield, Massachusetts Metropolitan Statistical Area.

== History ==
Southwick was originally inhabited by either the Matitacooke, Mayawaug, or Woronoake Native American tribes.

=== Early history ===
In the mid-17th century, pioneering English explorers moving up the Connecticut River Valley in search of fertile farmlands and game discovered the area and settled Southwick. It became a farming community, defined as the Southern (South-) village (-wick) part of the town of Westfield. Early on, it was nicknamed "Poverty Plains" because the land was thought to be infertile. Its first residential home was built by Samuel Fowler and his wife Naomi Noble on what is now College Highway (US 202 and MA 10), approximately one-quarter mile (0.4 km) north of the current town center.

In colonial times, church attendance was mandatory. The 800 Christian residents of Southwick in the 1760–1770s were required to travel to Westfield to congregate. Their envisioned parish could only be established by first building their church community. On November 7, 1770, Southwick was incorporated as a separate district of Westfield. The area of Southwick became somewhat smaller in 1770. The southernmost portion of Southwick joined Suffield, Connecticut, as the result of a simultaneous secession of citizens in that part of the village.

=== Independence ===
Southwick became a fully independent town in 1770. The town remained divided until 1793 when Massachusetts claimed the area (known as the "Southwick Jog"). A border dispute continued until 1804 when the current boundary was established through a compromise between Connecticut and Massachusetts. As a result of this border resolution, Southwick is the southernmost town in western Massachusetts.

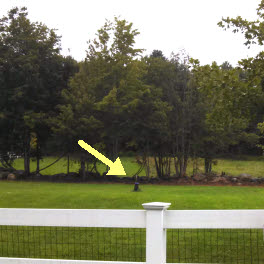
A stake marks the southernmost point in the "Southwick Jog" of the Massachusetts-Connecticut boundary. Seen from East Street in Granby, CT.

=== Early 1800s ===
In the early 19th century, the Farmington Canal and the Hampshire and Hampden Canal were built to link New Haven, Connecticut to Northampton through Southwick. Irish immigrants came to the area to labor on this project. Developers spoke of Southwick's potential, calling it the "Port of the World". Traces of the canal can still be found in the Great Brook and Congamond Lakes area. Due to winter freezing, summer drought, and wildlife impact (beaver dams, etc.), the canal was phased out in favor of a railroad.

Laflin-Phelps Homestead was built soon after the area was settled and remains the oldest standing structure in Southwick.

Completed in the late 1840s, the New Haven and Northampton Company's railroad was built alongside the canal. With the railroad came the ice industry and tourist resorts around the Congamond Lakes (which were named Wenekeiamaug by the previous native peoples). Along with the construction of a small amusement park, numerous elaborate hotels and dance halls were constructed. During the Industrial Era, summer vacationers and day-trippers would escape to Southwick from cities connected by the Northeast Railroad Corridor including New York City, Albany, Boston, Worcester, Hartford, and especially Springfield. There was a special stop near the lakes where visitors would disembark to swim and/or pile into canopied pleasure boats.

During WWI and WWII, trains loaded with soldiers would pass through town. It has been noted that local girls would gather letters thrown by the soldiers from the train and forward them to the intended recipients at the post office. The last train to pass along these tracks was circa 1976. As of 2022, the old railway was converted into a rail trail leading to Granby, Connecticut, known as the Farmington Canal Rail Trail.

All of Southwick's grand hotels and ornate train stations have since been torn down. Babb's Roller Skating Rink on the Suffield side of Congamond Lakes is all that remains of the amusement park.

== Industry ==
=== Tobacco farming ===
The farmland of Southwick is well-suited to grow tobacco, which is widely grown as a cash crop.

=== Ice harvesting ===
Ice collected from the Congamond Lakes was once stored in large ice houses in blocks and delivered via railway for food storage from New York City to Boston, before electric refrigerators were widely available.

== Geography ==
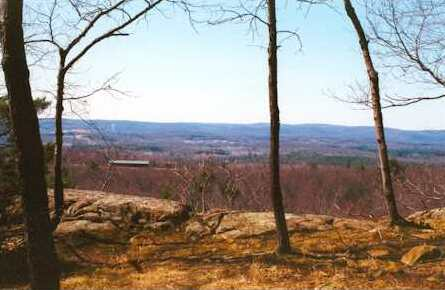
View from Provin Mountain over the Southwick countryside (along the Metacomet-Monadnock Trail)

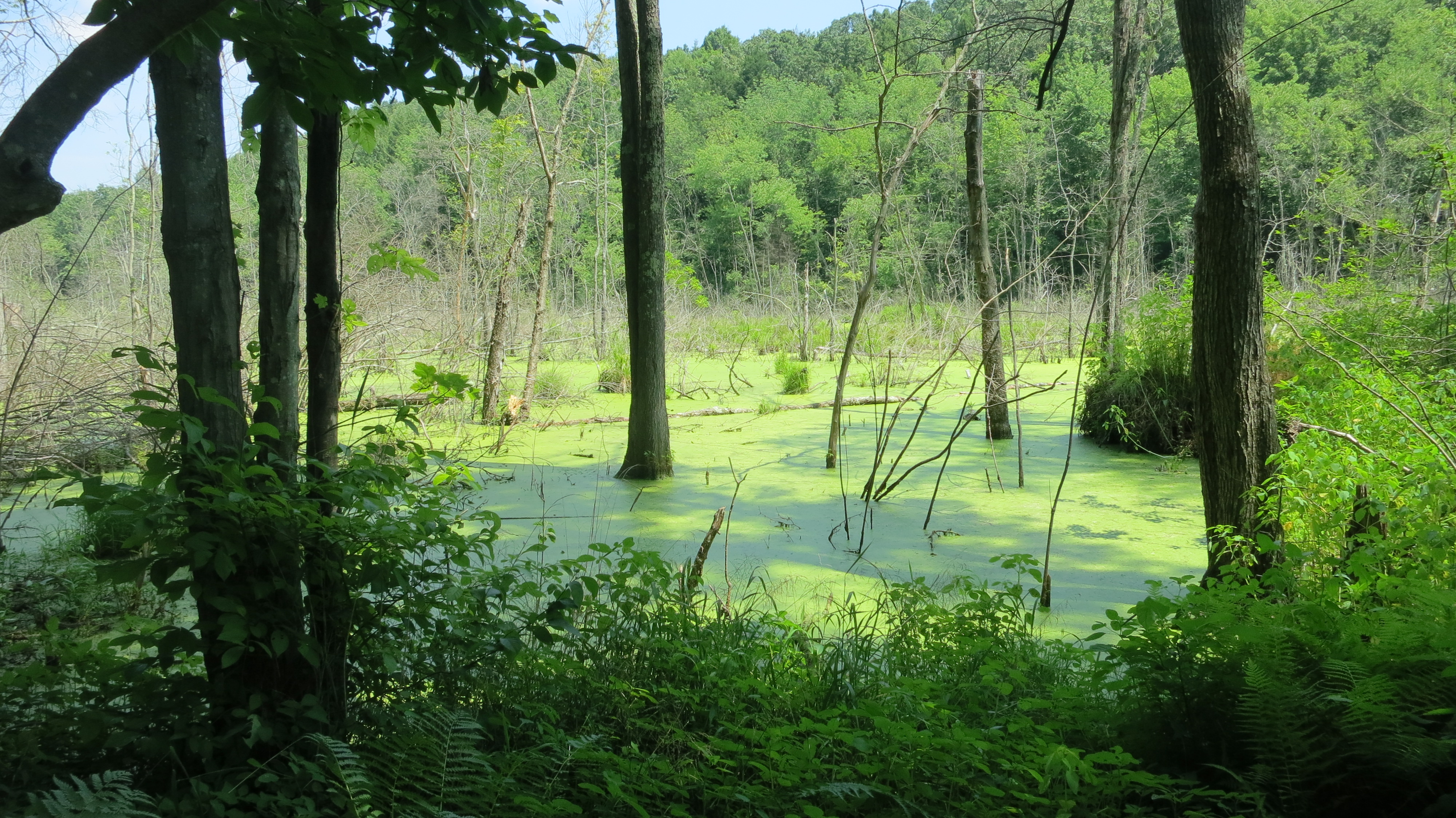
The M&M Trail skirts Harts Pond and its associated wetland before ascending to Provin Mountain.

Southwick is the southernmost town in western Massachusetts, as a result of the "jog" in the Massachusetts-Connecticut border. Southwick is bordered on the north by Westfield, on the east by Agawam, Massachusetts and Suffield, Connecticut, on the south by Suffield and Granby, Connecticut, and on the west by Granby and by Granville, Massachusetts.

U.S. Route 202 (College Highway) crosses the town, leading north from the town center 5 miles (8 km) to Westfield and south 7 miles (11 km) to Granby, Connecticut. Massachusetts Route 57 crosses Southwick east to west, leading east 12 miles (19 km) to downtown Springfield and west into the Berkshires.

According to the United States Census Bureau, the town of Southwick has a total area of 31.7 square miles (82.0 km^{2}), of which 30.8 square miles (79.8 km^{2}) are land and 0.85 square miles (2.2 km^{2}), or 2.63%, are water.

The 114-mile (183 km) Metacomet-Monadnock Trail (a hiking trail) passes through wetlands near Harts Pond before ascending over Provin Mountain, a trap rock ridge and cliff line that forms the eastern border of Southwick. Provin Mountain is part of the Metacomet Ridge, a mountainous trap rock ridgeline that stretches from Long Island Sound to near the Vermont border.

== Demographics ==
Historical population
Year	Pop.	±%
1790	841	—
1850	1,120	+33.2%
1860	1,188	+6.1%
1870	1,100	−7.4%
1880	1,104	+0.4%
1890	914	−17.2%
1900	1,040	+13.8%
1910	1,020	−1.9%
1920	1,194	+17.1%
1930	1,461	+22.4%
1940	1,579	+8.1%
1950	2,855	+80.8%
1960	5,139	+80.0%
1970	6,330	+23.2%
1980	7,382	+16.6%
1990	7,667	+3.9%
2000	8,835	+15.2%
2010	9,502	+7.5%
2020	9,232	−2.8%
2022	9,190	−0.5%
Source: United States census records and Population Estimates Program data.

As of the census of 2000, there were 8,835 people, 3,318 households, and 2,418 families residing in the town. The population density was 285.4 inhabitants per square mile (110.2/km^{2}). There were 3,533 housing units at an average density of 114.1 per square mile (44.1/km^{2}). The racial makeup of the town was 97.41% White, 0.51% African American, 0.20% Native American, 0.37% Asian, 0.01% Pacific Islander, 0.34% from other races, and 1.15% from two or more races. Hispanic or Latino of any race were 1.72% of the population.

There were 3,318 households, out of which 36.6% had children under the age of 18 living with them, 60.0% were married couples living together, 8.3% had a female householder with no husband present, and 27.1% were non-families. Of all households, 21.9% were made up of individuals, and 9.9% had someone living alone who was 65 years of age or older. The average household size was 2.66 and the average family size was 3.13.

In the town, the population was spread out, with 26.5% under the age of 18, 6.3% from 18 to 24, 32.2% from 25 to 44, 23.2% from 45 to 64, and 11.7% who were 65 years of age or older. The median age was 38 years. For every 100 females, there were 100.4 males. For every 100 females age 18 and over, there were 98.2 males.

The median income for a household in the town was $52,296, and the median income for a family was $64,456. Males had a median income of $41,863 versus $30,889 for females. The per capita income for the town was $21,756. About 3.8% of families and 6.1% of the population were below the poverty line, including 6.3% of those under age 18 and 9.8% of those age 65 or over.

== Education ==
Southwick is part of the Southwick-Tolland-Granville Regional School District, along with Granville and Tolland. Students attend Woodland School from grades K to 2, and Powder Mill School from grades 3 to 6. High school students attend Southwick Regional School from grades 7 to 12. A vote in May 2012 in Southwick approved a $62 million school renovation and construction project that was completed in 2015.

=== Select Board (formerly called Board of Selectmen) ===
- Diane Gale, Vice-Chair
- Doug Moglin, Clerk
- Russ Anderson, Member

=== Library ===
The Southwick Free Public Library was established in 1892. In fiscal year 2008, the town of Southwick spent 2.03% ($316,544) of its budget on its public library—approximately $33 per person, per year ($43.49 adjusted for inflation to 2022).

== Notable people ==
- Amasa Holcomb, (1787-1875) first telescope fabricator and manufacturer in the United States
- Matthew Laflin, (1803–1897) American businessman, philanthropist, and a founder of Chicago
- Rebecca Lobo, television basketball analyst and former player in the professional Women's National Basketball Association (WNBA) for the New York Liberty (1997-2001), Houston Comets (2002), and Connecticut Sun (2003).
- Jerri Nielsen, a physician who self-treated her breast cancer while stationed at Amundsen–Scott South Pole Station in Antarctica.
