= Rebecca Lobo =

American basketball player (born 1973)

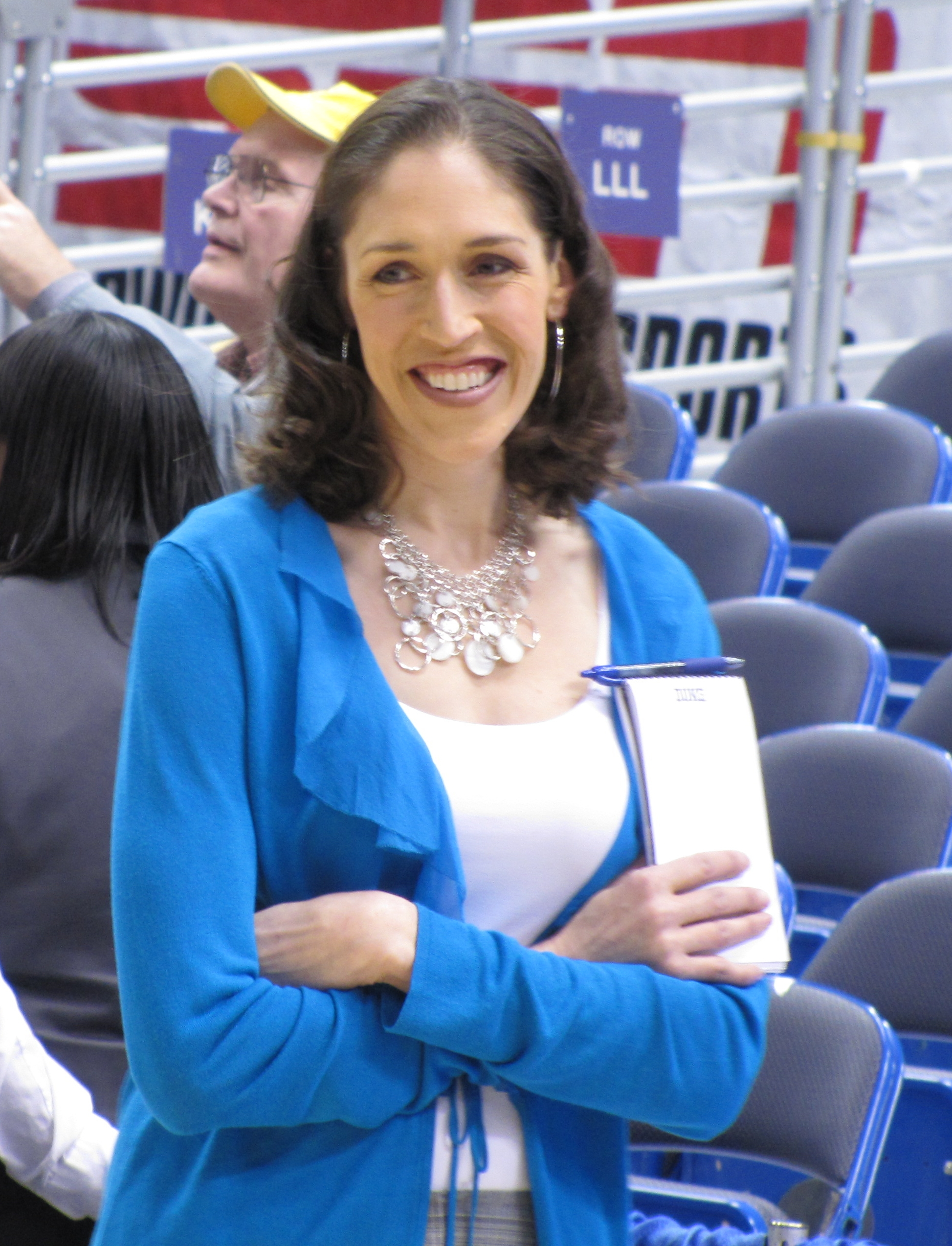
- Lobo in 2012

Personal information
- Born: October 6, 1973 (age 53) Hartford, Connecticut, U.S.
- Listed height: 6 ft 4 in (1.93 m)
- Listed weight: 185 lb (84 kg)

Career information
- High school: Southwick-Tolland (Southwick, Massachusetts)
- College: UConn (1991–1995)
- WNBA draft: 1997: Allocated
- Drafted by: New York Liberty
- Playing career: 1997–2003
- Position: Center
- Number: 50

Career history
- 1997–2001: New York Liberty
- 2002: Houston Comets
- 2002–2003: Springfield Spirit
- 2003: Connecticut Sun

Career highlights
- WNBA All-Star (1999); All-WNBA Second Team (1997); NCAA champion (1995); NCAA Tournament MOP (1995); AP Player of the Year (1995); Honda Sports Award (1995); Honda-Broderick Cup (1995); Naismith College Player of the Year (1995); Wade Trophy (1995); WBCA Player of the Year (1995); USBWA National Player of the Year (1995); NCAA Woman of the Year Award (1995); Women's Basketball Academic All-American of the Year (1995); 2× All-American – Kodak, USBWA (1994, 1995); First-team All-American – AP (1995); 2× Big East Player of the Year (1994, 1995); Big East Tournament MOP (1994); 3× First-team All-Big East (1993–1995); Big East Freshman of the Year (1992); Big East All-Freshman Team (1992); No. 50 retired by UConn Huskies
- Stats at Basketball Reference
- Basketball Hall of Fame
- Women's Basketball Hall of Fame
Medals
Representing the United States
Olympic Games
| Gold medal – first place | 1996 Atlanta | Team competition |
FIBA Under-18 Americas Championship
| Silver medal – second place | 1992 Mexico | Team |

Rebecca Rose Lobo-Rushin (born October 6, 1973) is an American television basketball analyst and former professional women's basketball player in the Women's National Basketball Association (WNBA) from 1997 to 2003. Lobo, at 6'4", played the center position for much of her career. She played college basketball at the University of Connecticut, where she was a member of the team that won the 1995 national championship, going 35–0 on the season in the process. She was inducted into the Women's Basketball Hall of Fame in 2010. She has been inducted into the Naismith Basketball Hall of Fame twice: in 2017 for her individual playing career, and in 2026 as a member of the 1996 United States women's Olympic basketball team.

== Early life ==
Lobo was born in Hartford, Connecticut, the youngest daughter of RuthAnn (née Hardy) and Dennis Joseph Lobo. Her father is of Cuban descent, while her mother was of German and Irish heritage. Lobo was raised a Catholic. Her brother Jason played basketball at Dartmouth College and her sister Rachel played basketball at Salem State College. Lobo's mother and father were both teachers; her father also coached basketball and track and field. Raised in Southwick, Massachusetts, Lobo was the state scoring record-holder with 2,740 points in her high school career for Southwick-Tolland Regional High School in Massachusetts. She held this record for 18 years until it was surpassed by Bilqis Abdul-Qaadir of the new Leadership Charter School in Springfield on January 26, 2009.

== College career ==
More than 100 colleges recruited Lobo, but she chose the University of Connecticut due to its proximity and her belief in its academic excellence. She helped lead the Huskies to the 1995 National Championship with an undefeated 35–0 record. In her senior year, Lobo was the unanimous national player of the year, winning the 1995 Naismith College Player of the Year award, the Wade Trophy, the AP Player of the Year award, the USBWA Player of the Year award, the Honda Sports Award for basketball, and the WBCA Player of the Year award. She was awarded the prestigious Honda-Broderick Cup for 1994–95, presented to the athlete "most deserving of recognition as the Collegiate Woman Athlete of the Year". She was a member of the inaugural class of inductees to the University of Connecticut women's basketball "Huskies of Honor" recognition program. The Women's Sports Foundation named Lobo the 1995 Sportswoman of the Year (in the team category). She was the first player in the Big East Conference to earn first-team all-American honors for both basketball and academics.

== USA Basketball ==
Lobo was named to the USA U18 team (then called the Junior World Championship Qualifying Team) in 1992. The team competed in Guanajuato, Mexico in August 1992. The team won their first four games, then lost 80–70 to Brazil, finishing with the silver medal for the event, but qualifying for the 1993 world games. Lobo averaged 6.8 points per game during the event.

Lobo continued with the team to the 1993 U19 World Championship (then called the Junior World Championship). The team won five games and lost two, but that left them in seventh place. Lobo averaged 7.7 points per game and recorded six blocks, highest on the team.

In 1995, Lobo passed through tryouts to join the national team, which later became the US team for the 1996 Olympics in Atlanta, GA. Though her minutes on the floor were few, Lobo shared in the gold medal.

== Professional career ==
In 1997, the WNBA was formed and enjoyed its inaugural season, and Lobo was assigned to the New York Liberty during the league's first player allocations on January 22, 1997. Her debut game was played on June 21, 1997, in a 67 - 57 victory over the Los Angeles Sparks where she recorded 16 points, 6 rebounds and 3 assists. In her first season, the Liberty fell to the Houston Comets in the WNBA Finals.

Lobo remained a centerpiece of the Liberty in the 1998 season, averaging 11.7 points and 6.9 rebounds as the Liberty finished 18 - 12. Although they had a great record, the Liberty would not make the playoffs in 1998 due to being 5th in the league standings and only the top 4 teams made the playoffs. The Charlotte Sting also had a 18 - 12 record, but made it in the playoffs over the Liberty due to having a better Conference record (11 - 5 to New York's 8 - 8).

Lobo suffered a setback in 1999, tearing her left anterior cruciate ligament and her meniscus in the first game of the season. In 1999, she was selected to the inaugural WNBA All Star team but could not play because of the injury. In December, she reinjured her knee and ended missing all of the 2000 season.

Lobo returned during the 2001 season but played sparingly, only 85 minutes in total.

In January 2002, during the WNBA offseason, Lobo joined the Springfield Spirit in the National Women's Basketball League.

On April 3, 2002, the Liberty traded her to the Houston Comets in exchange for Houston's second-round selection (26th overall) in the 2002 WNBA draft (the Liberty would use the pick to draft Linda Fröhlich).

During the WNBA offseason, Lobo returned again to the Spirit. In her first game of the season in February 2003, she had 25 points and 14 rebounds.

On February 14, 2003, Lobo was traded to the Connecticut Sun for a 2003 second-round pick (which the Comets used to select Lori Nero). Lobo played in 29 games for the Sun, averaging 2.4 points and 2.1 rebounds. Her final WNBA game ever was played in Game 2 of the 2003 Eastern Conference Finals against the Detroit Shock on September 7, 2003. Lobo recorded 9 points, 6 rebounds, 4 assists, and 3 blocks but the Sun lost the game 73 - 79 and would be eliminated from the playoffs. Lobo would announce her retirement on September 23, 2003.

== Awards and honors ==
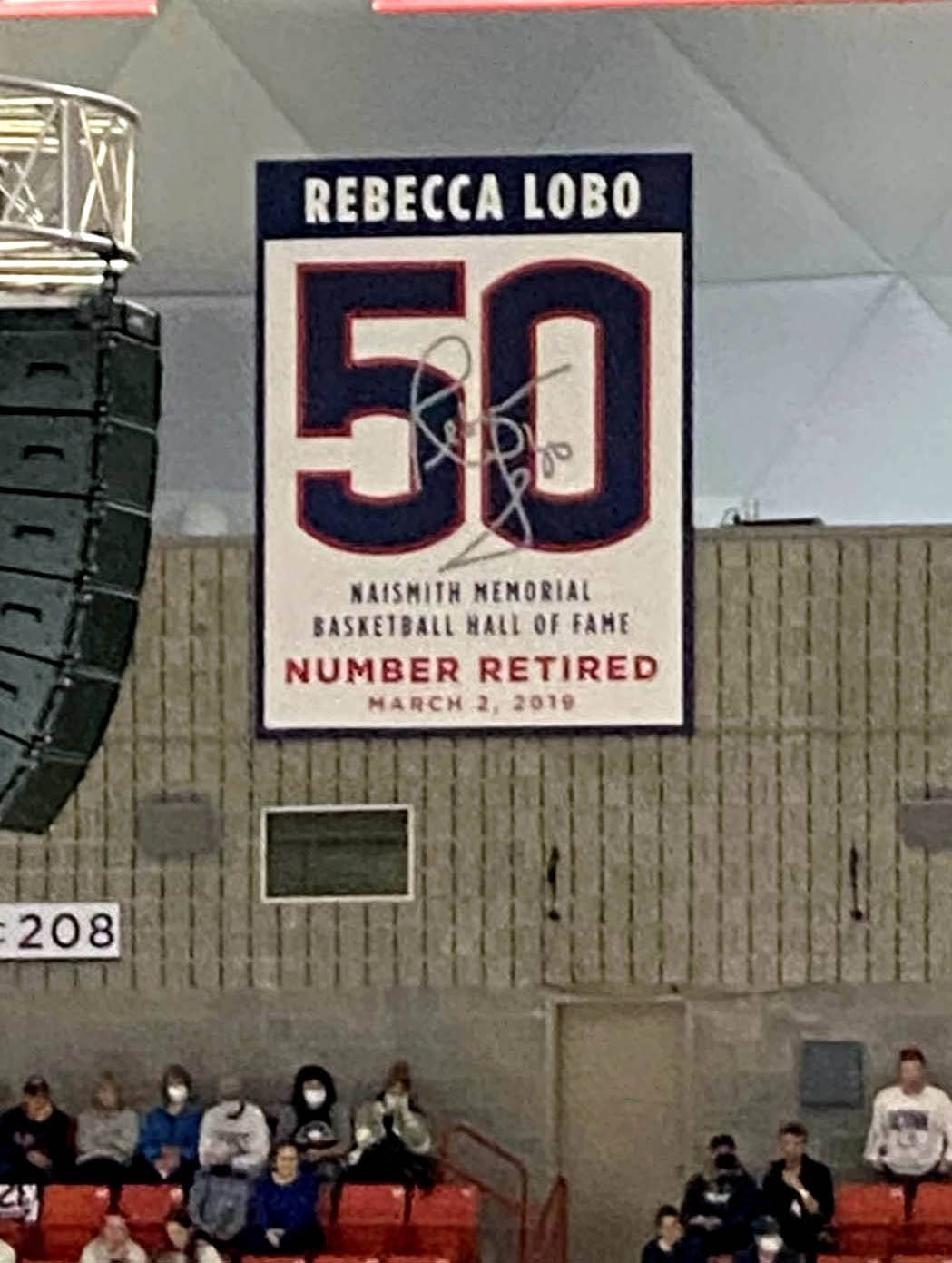
The retired #50 worn by Rebecca Lobo at UConn in 2022

1994

- Kodak First team All-America

1995

- Honda-Broderick Cup
- ESPY Award–Outstanding Female Athlete
- AP Female Athlete of the Year
- NCAA Women's Basketball Player of the Year
- Women's Sports Foundation–Sportswoman of the Year
- Wade Trophy
- Kodak First team All-America
- Honda Sports Award, basketball

1997

- All WNBA Second team
- WNBA Eastern All-Star team

2010

- Women's Basketball Hall of Fame

2017

- Basketball Hall of Fame

2019

- UConn jersey No. 50 retired

=== Women's Basketball Hall of Fame ===
Lobo was inducted into the Women's Basketball Hall of Fame as part of the class of 2010.

At the induction ceremony, she was introduced by her college coach, Geno Auriemma, who praised her for her "impact on the court and off the court" as "one of the founders [of the WNBA]", and "as a representative of our university, [and] as a member of the board of trustees".

== Career statistics ==
=== College ===
Rebecca Lobo Statistics at University of Connecticut
| Year | G | FG | FGA | PCT | 3FG | 3FGA | PCT | FT | FTA | PCT | REB | AVG | A | TO | B | S | MIN | PTS | AVG |
| 1991–92 | 29 | 167 | 338 | 0.494 | 0 | 1 | 0.000 | 82 | 117 | 0.701 | 228 | 7.9 | 26 | 78 | 46 | 30 | 675 | 416 | 14.3 |
| 1992–93 | 29 | 189 | 421 | 0.449 | 29 | 85 | 0.341 | 77 | 119 | 0.647 | 326 | 11.2 | 37 | 75 | 97 | 26 | 926 | 484 | 16.7 |
| 1993–94 | 33 | 243 | 445 | 0.546 | 11 | 34 | 0.324 | 138 | 187 | 0.738 | 371 | 11.2 | 68 | 107 | 131 | 34 | 966 | 635 | 19.2 |
| 1994–95 | 35 | 238 | 476 | 0.5 | 18 | 51 | 0.353 | 104 | 154 | 0.675 | 343 | 9.8 | 129 | 91 | 122 | 40 | 1005 | 598 | 17.1 |
| Totals | 126 | 837 | 1680 | 0.498 | 58 | 171 | 0.339 | 401 | 577 | 0.695 | 1268 | 10.1 | 260 | 351 | 396 | 130 | 3572 | 2133 | 16.9 |

=== WNBA ===
Legend
| GP | Games played | GS | Games started | MPG | Minutes per game | RPG | Rebounds per game |
| APG | Assists per game | SPG | Steals per game | BPG | Blocks per game | PPG | Points per game |
| TO | Turnovers per game | FG% | Field-goal percentage | 3P% | 3-point field-goal percentage | FT% | Free-throw percentage |
| **Bold** | Career best | ° | League leader |

==== Regular season ====
| Year | Team | GP | GS | MPG | FG% | 3P% | FT% | RPG | APG | SPG | BPG | TO | PPG |
|---|---|---|---|---|---|---|---|---|---|---|---|---|---|
| 1997 | New York | 28 | 28 | **33.5** | .376 | .286 | .610 | **7.3** | **1.9** | **0.9** | **1.8** | 3.1 | **12.4** |
| 1998 | New York | **30** | **30** | 29.2 | **.484** | .308 | **.710** | 6.9 | 1.5 | 0.6 | 1.1 | 2.2 | 11.7 |
| 1999 | New York | 1 | 1 | 1.0 | | | | 1.0 | 0.0 | 0.0 | 0.0 | 1.0 | 0.0 |
| 2001 | New York | 16 | 0 | 5.3 | .318 | **.500** | .500 | 0.9 | 0.1 | 0.1 | 0.0 | **0.4** | 1.1 |
| 2002 | Houston | 21 | 0 | 6.3 | .469 | .429 | .250 | 1.1 | 0.6 | 0.1 | 0.2 | 0.5 | 1.6 |
| 2003 | Connecticut | 25 | 13 | 11.9 | .284 | .250 | .222 | 2.1 | 0.2 | 0.2 | 0.6 | 0.6 | 2.4 |
| Career | 6 years, 3 teams | 121 | 72 | 19.2 | .407 | .295 | .628 | 4.1 | 1.0 | 0.4 | 0.9 | 1.6 | 6.7 |

==== Playoffs ====
| Year | Team | GP | GS | MPG | FG% | 3P% | FT% | RPG | APG | SPG | BPG | TO | PPG |
|---|---|---|---|---|---|---|---|---|---|---|---|---|---|
| 1997 | New York | **2** | **2** | **34.0** | **.429** | .000 | **.583** | **9.0** | 2.0 | 0.0 | **2.0** | 2.5 | **12.5** |
| 2003 | Connecticut | **2** | 1 | 19.0 | .400 | **.250** | .000 | 4.0 | **2.5** | 0.0 | **2.0** | **1.0** | 4.5 |
| Career | 2 years, 2 teams | 4 | 3 | 26.5 | .419 | .143 | .583 | 6.5 | 2.3 | 0.0 | 2.0 | 1.8 | 8.5 |

== Broadcast career ==
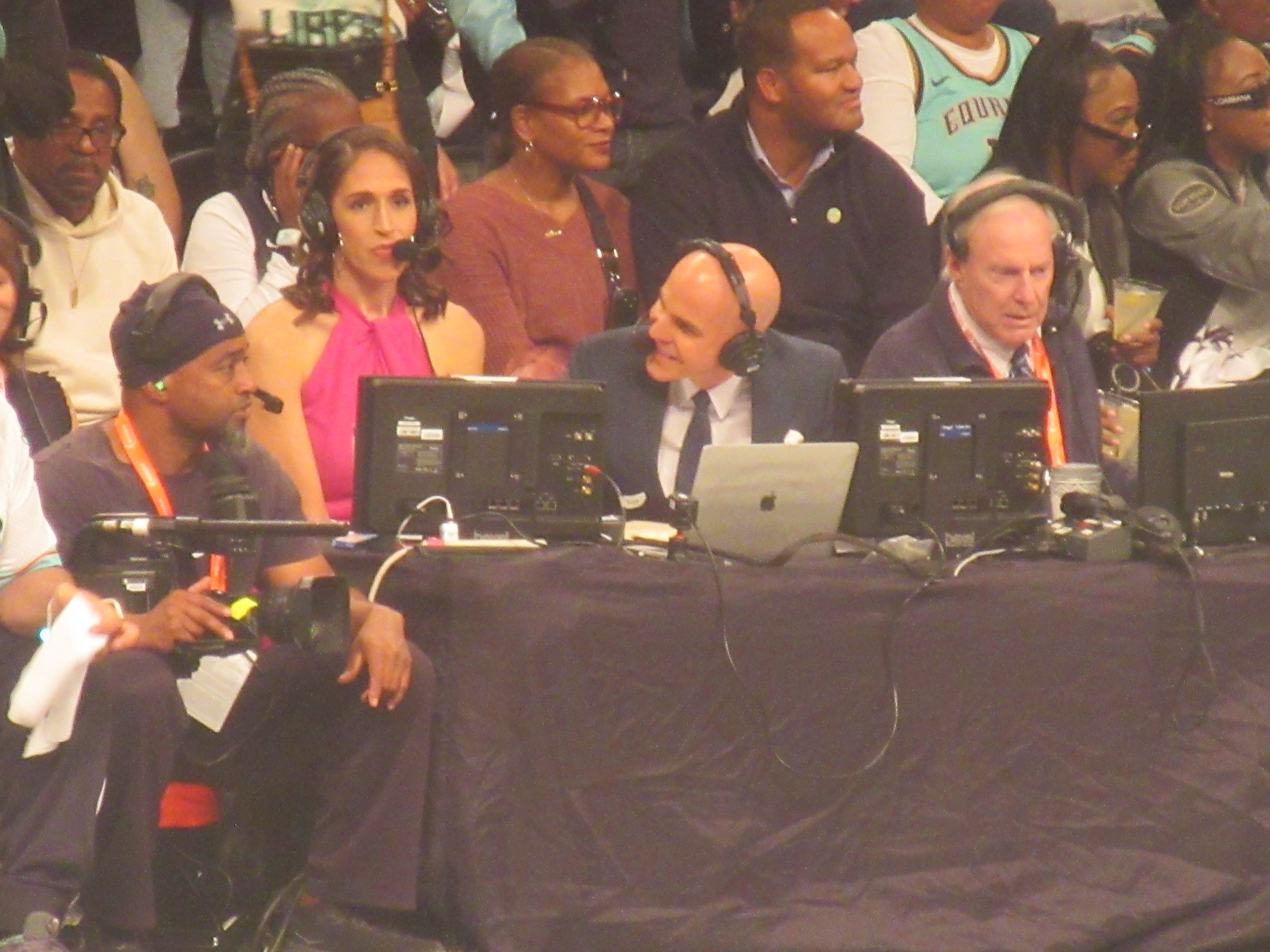
Calling Game 1 of the 2024 WNBA Finals for ESPN

Today, Lobo is a reporter and color analyst for ESPN with a focus on women's college basketball and WNBA games.

Lobo faced criticism for her commentary during an April 1, 2024, NCAA women's basketball Elite Eight game between the Iowa Hawkeyes and LSU Tigers in Albany, New York, after she remarked during an exchange with ESPN announcer Ryan Ruocco, "And, by the way, good luck finding something to do in Albany." Lobo has since apologized to the city of Albany.

== Breast cancer advocate and health spokesperson ==
In 1996, Lobo and her late mother, Ruth Ann Lobo, collaborated on a book entitled The Home Team, which dealt with Ruth Ann's battle with breast cancer. They also founded the Ruth Ann and Rebecca Lobo Scholarship, which offers a scholarship to the UConn School of Allied Health for Hispanic students. Lobo was the 1996 spokesperson for the Lee National Denim Day fundraiser which raises millions of dollars for breast cancer research and education.

Starting in 2000, Lobo served as national spokesperson and backer for Body1.com, a consumer-targeted network of sites providing interactive content-rich information on medical technologies that treat ailments and diseases specific to body parts. Due to her recurring problems with a torn anterior cruciate ligament (ACL), she campaigned to raise awareness of knee injury risks in women. She shared her story with others suffering from the same type of injury and advocated for patient self-education via the Internet.

== Personal life ==
On April 12, 2003, Lobo changed her last name to Lobo-Rushin after marrying Sports Illustrated writer Steve Rushin at the Basketball Hall of Fame in Springfield, Massachusetts. They have three daughters and one son.

== Ball & Chain Podcast ==
Lobo and Rushin host the weekly Ball & Chain Podcast, where they discuss current events, sports and family life. They released its first episode on October 23, 2017.

== See also ==
- List of Connecticut Huskies women's basketball players with 1000 points
- List of Connecticut Huskies women's basketball players with 1000 rebounds
