= Laflin-Phelps Homestead =

United States historic place in Southwick, Massachusetts

- U.S. National Register of Historic Places
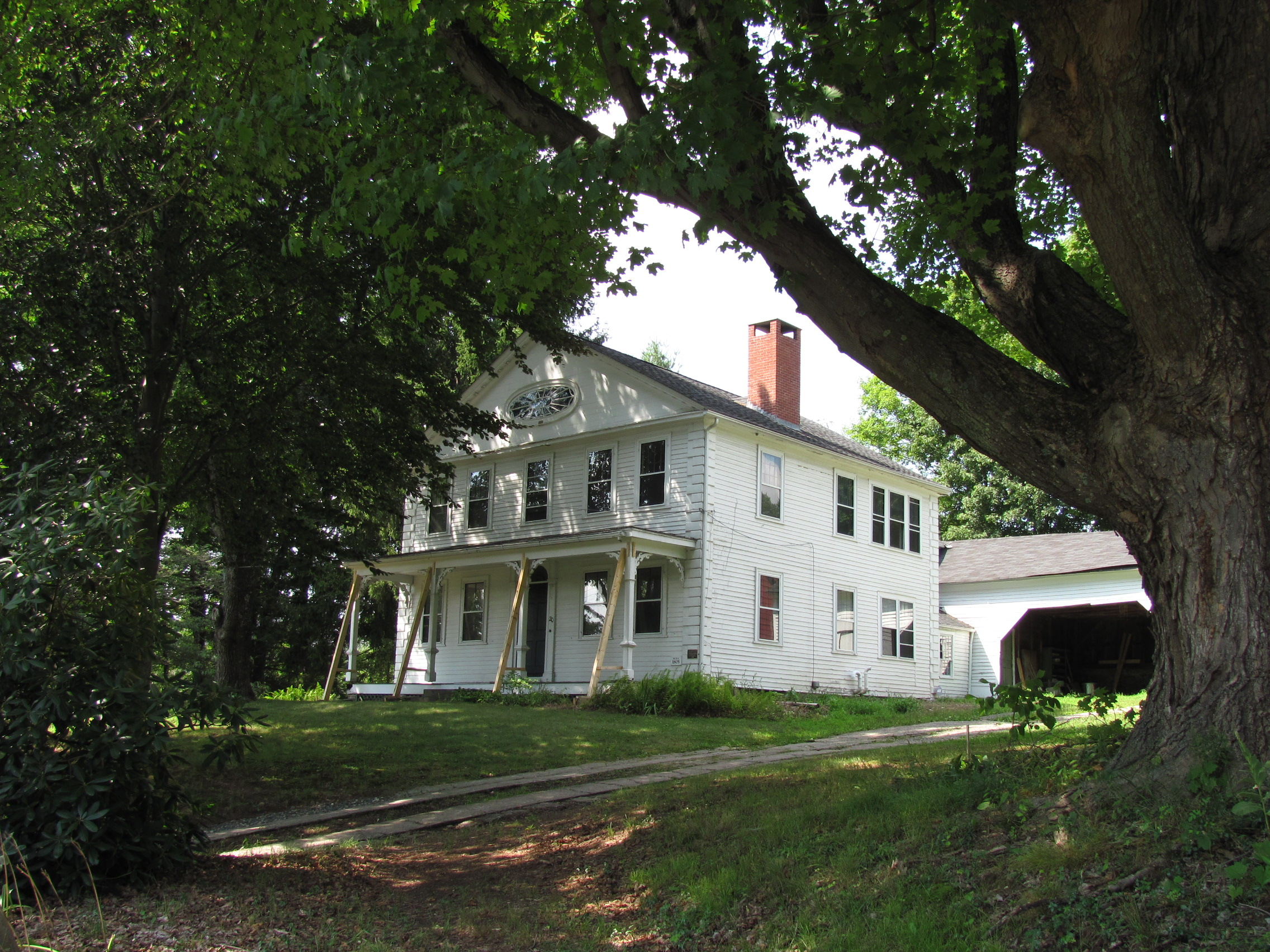
- Laflin-Phelps Homestead

- Location within Massachusetts Location within the United States
- Location: 20 Depot St., Southwick, Massachusetts
- Coordinates: 42°3′14″N 72°46′2″W
- Area: 27 acres (11 ha)
- Built: c. 1808–1821
- Architectural style: Federal
- NRHP reference No.: 05001371
- Added to NRHP: December 6, 2005

The Laflin—Phelps Homestead is a historic house at 20 Depot Street in Southwick, Massachusetts. Built in the early 19th century, circa 1808–1821, it is a local example of Federal style architecture. The property was listed in the National Register of Historic Places in 2005.

== Description and history ==
The Laflin—Phelps Homestead is located on the eastern fringe of Southwick's village center, on the north side of Depot Street opposite its junction with Sheep Pasture Road. It is a 2 1/2-story wood-frame structure, with a gabled roof and clapboarded exterior. It originally had a 1 1/2-story ell on the back, which was expanded to a full 2 1/2 stories sometime between 1830 and 1850. The main facade is five bays wide, with a single-story Victorian porch extending across the front. It has wooden corner quoin, and a fully pedimented gable with an oval window in the center. The interior follows a modified center hall plan, with the central staircase closed off from the hall and set further back than is typical for houses of its period. The right front parlor features a particularly fine Federal style fireplace mantel, and wide pine floors are found in several rooms. A barn, built c. 1820, was demolished in 2004; only its foundation remains.

The date of the house's construction is uncertain: the property was purchased in 1809 by Heman Laflin, member of the locally prominent Laflin family, who were among Southwick's early settlers. It is not believed that there was a house on the property in 1807, so the house may have been built either by or for Laflin. The Laflins were the first family in the town to establish industry in Southwick, founding mills for the manufacture of gunpowder in 1775, some of which supported the Continental Army during the American Revolutionary War. The house was purchased from the Laflin family by Marcus Phelps in 1865, in whose family it remained as of 2016. The house stands on just over 27 acres (11 ha), reduced from a larger farm parcel.

== See also ==
- National Register of Historic Places listings in Hampden County, Massachusetts
