= Southwick Jog =

Salient in Southwick, Massachusetts, US

Southwick on a map of Massachusetts

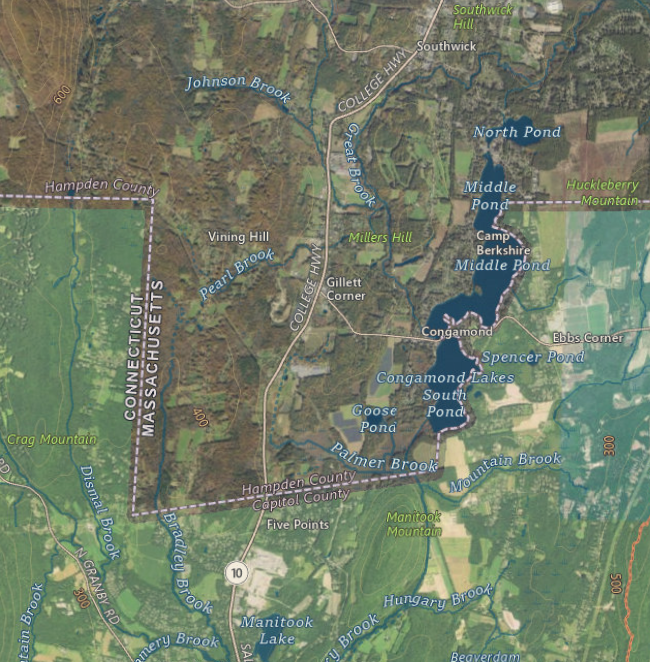
Close-up of the Southwick Jog

The Southwick Jog is a two-square-mile salient in Southwick, Massachusetts, United States. The land sits along the Massachusetts–Connecticut border and is noted for being an irregularity along a mostly straight line. In Connecticut, it is also known as the Southwick Notch, Congamond Notch, Granby Notch, or simply The Notch.

Between 1642 and 1804, the land was contested between Massachusetts and Connecticut and was two times larger before a compromise was reached.

== History ==
=== Early disputes ===
After the conclusion of the Pequot War, Massachusetts claimed territory that had been controlled by the Pequot peoples. They demanded land down to the Mystic River in southern Connecticut, though Connecticut immediately repudiated these demands as baseless. The land fell well outside of the claims in the Massachusetts charter, and so they soon gave up their claims.

=== Initial surveys ===
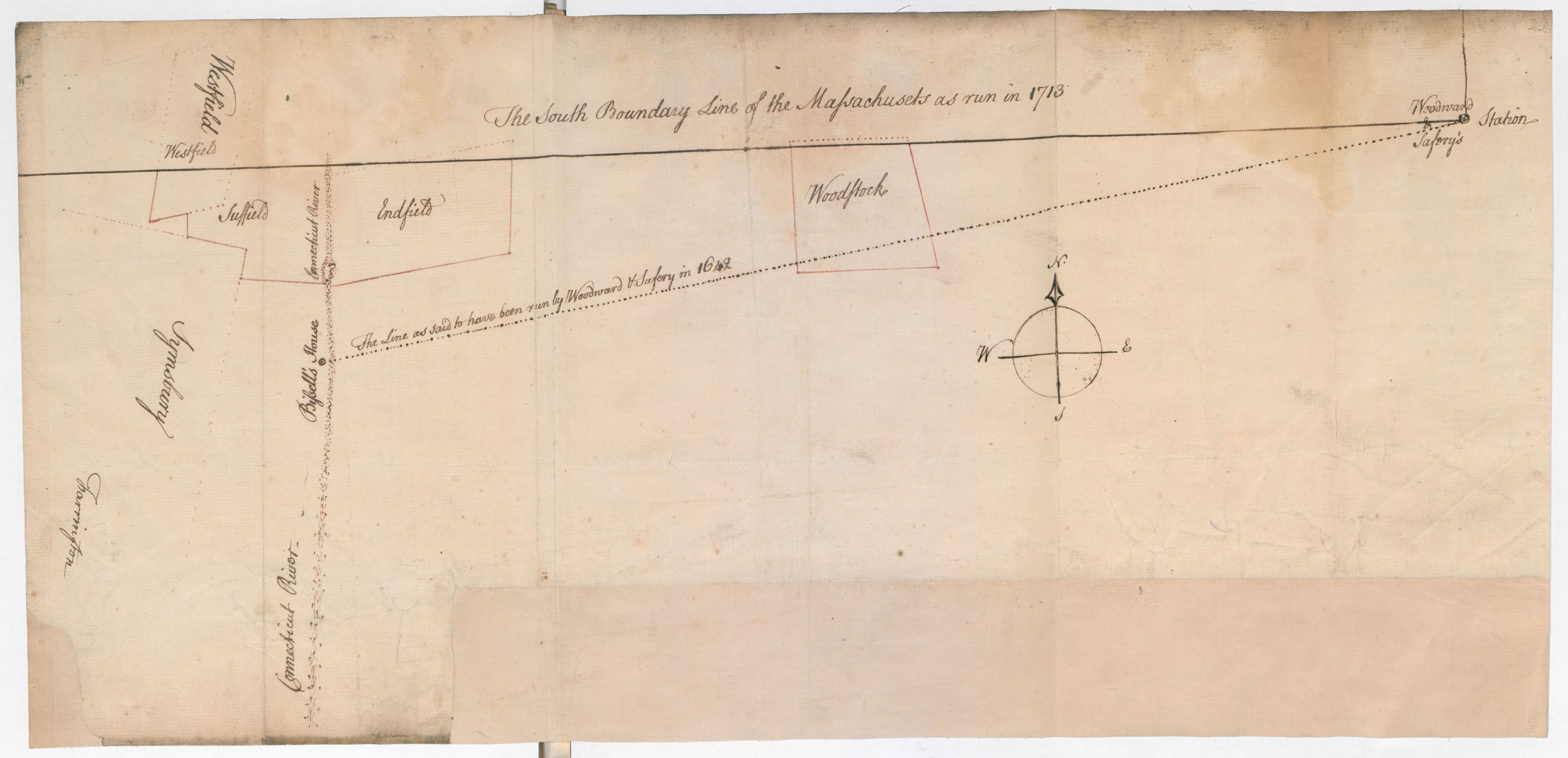
1713 map of the border, depicting contemporary and past claims

After the founding of Hartford, Connecticut, in 1635 and Springfield, Massachusetts, in 1636, colonists began rapidly settling the region, and the western boundary of the Massachusetts Bay Colony and Connecticut Colony became a pressing issue. Springfield was initially believed to fall south of the border and thus be part of Connecticut. To resolve the issue, John Winthrop of the Massachusetts Bay Colony hired two surveyors, Nathaniel Woodward and Solomon Saffery, to map the border in 1642. The border was described in the Massachusetts Charter as heading due west from a point three miles south of the southernmost point of the Charles River. Thus, instead of directly west from the starting point, the surveyors attempted to save time by sailing into the Long Island Sound and up the Connecticut River, where they believed they would stake the western end of the border at the same latitude as the eastern end. However, they fixed the line much further south than described in the Charter. (Note: The disparity has been described as four miles at its narrowest and either seven or eight miles at its widest.) (Note: A common tale includes that the mistake was due to Woodward and Saffery being drunk on the day of the survey, but this is not based in fact.) While Connecticut protested the survey at a 1649 meeting between the colonies, they had no proof it was incorrect and no charter demarcating their own border.

The creation of The Connecticut Charter of 1662, which delineated Connecticut's borders, and the founding of Enfield and Suffield by Massachusetts below the charter lines increased the importance of the border in subsequent decades. Due to the growth of the border town of Windsor, Connecticut, it grew unclear where the Woodward–Saffery line fell through it. Massachusetts proposed a re-survey of the land and offered that the line could be extended north in the area around the town. Connecticut rejected the offer, instead proposing a joint survey to find the true line. Massachusetts rejected this, and so Connecticut hired two men (Note: Identified as William Whitney and either John Butler or John Butcher) to perform an overland resurvey of the territory. The survey took place in 1695 and conclusively found the line to be too far south. Massachusetts rejected the results, maintaining that the Woodward–Saffery line was perfectly fine. On May 9, 1700, Connecticut offered to settle the line as it was originally surveyed, on the condition that they would take land a mile north of the line when it reached within 12 miles of the Connecticut River. Massachusetts rejected the offer, demanding that the line be pushed south and the town of Woodstock, split between the two states, be fully placed under Massachusetts ownership. Negotiations subsequently stalled.

A third survey was conducted in 1702 by Massachusetts citizen James Taylor and Connecticut citizens Pitkin and Whiting. It came to almost exactly the same results as the Butler–Whitney survey conducted two years earlier. When presented with the results, Massachusetts claimed that the Woodward–Saffery line was still in effect, and Taylor had no right to represent Massachusetts. Both colonies threatened that they would appeal to Great Britain if their claims were not accepted. In 1708, the Connecticut General Assembly revived these threats, and soon after, both colonies would send memorials to Great Britain appealing their cases. Connecticut argued that the Woodward–Saffery line violated Massachusetts' charter, while Massachusetts claimed that no survey had produced the identical lines, and the Woodward–Saffery line was the oldest. However, Connecticut lacked the funds to properly advocate their claims, and their agent, Sir Henry Ashurst, in Great Britain, died after the memorial was delivered. As a result, the state decided to negotiate the border with Massachusetts directly. In 1713, a compromise was struck between the two states: the border would be moved north of the Woodward–Saffery line, Massachusetts would receive the towns of Enfield, Suffield, and Woodstock below the new border, and Connecticut would take a proportional amount of territory from Massachusetts. The land Connecticut took from Massachusetts, measuring a total of 107,793 acres (436.22 km^{2}), was sold back to Massachusetts in 1715 for £683. The line would be laid in 1717 without any dispute.

=== Border town dispute and resolution ===
While Connecticut had relinquished all claims over Enfield and Suffield to Massachusetts, the two towns opposed the transfer. Connecticut had lower taxes, a significantly more liberal charter than Massachusetts, and a large Connecticut population. They would request admission to Connecticut in 1724, who declined the request so as to not reopen the border dispute. However, Massachusetts' taxes would continue to rise in subsequent decades to pay for King George's War. In March 1747 the town of Woodstock would request admission to Connecticut with the support of the attorney general of New York. They argued that they were not consulted in the transfer and that colonies could not exchange territory without the approval of the crown. Soon after, Enfield and Suffield would reopen their requests.

For decades, tensions rose between Massachusetts and Connecticut, and calls for England to settle the matter were ignored, as the country was in the midst of the Seven Years' War. By 1768, Massachusetts formally claimed the four towns involved, despite them remaining governed by Connecticut.

In 1797, boundary commissioners appointed by the states were requested to run a straight line along the border. As a result of the four disputed towns now being within the territory of Connecticut, the commissioners instead awarded Massachusetts a two-and-a-half square mile plot of land now known as the Southwick Jog. The current border was not defined until 1804, when the area of the Congamond Lakes was split between the states, with five-eighths of the land going to Massachusetts.

== In local culture ==
In the years after the border was resolved, people living around the jog began creating folklore and urban legends to explain the existence of the unusual border. Some stories are that the surveyors had been drunk during the border's creation, or that it was so Massachusetts didn't slide into the Atlantic Ocean.

In modern times, a playful dispute over the territory has remained. In the area, T-shirts and other merchandise can be found with the slogan "take back the notch", and a forum of the same name can be found on Reddit.

== Cited works ==
- Bowen, Clarence (1882). The Boundary Disputes of Connecticut. Boston: James R. Osgood and Company.
- Clark, George (1914). A History of Connecticut: Its People and Institutions. G.P. Putnam's Sons.
- Dodge, Edward (1970). "The Southwick Jog" (PDF). Southwick Massachusetts.
- Holland, Josiah (1855). History of Western Massachusetts. S. Bowles and Company.
- Hooker, Roland Mather (1933). Boundaries of Connecticut. Tercentenary Commission of the state of Connecticut. Yale University Press.
