= List of NCAA Division I men's basketball tournament Final Four broadcasters =

Since 2010, the NCAA has had a joint contract with CBS and Warner Bros. Discovery. The coverage of the tournament is split between CBS, TNT, TBS, and truTV.

Broadcasters from CBS, TBS, and TNT's sports coverage are shared across all four networks, with CBS' college basketball teams supplemented with TNT's NBA teams, while studio segments take place at the CBS Broadcast Center in New York City and TNT's studios in Atlanta. In the New York–based studio shows, CBS' Adam Zucker and Clark Kellogg are joined by Ernie Johnson, Kenny Smith, and Charles Barkley of TNT's Inside the NBA while Seth Davis and Jay Wright of CBS assist with NBA on TNT Tuesday's Adam Lefkoe and Candace Parker. While three of TNT's NBA voices, Kevin Harlan, Ian Eagle, and Spero Dedes are already employed by CBS in other capacities, TNT also lends analysts Stan Van Gundy, Jim Jackson, Grant Hill, and Steve Smith, secondary play-by-play man Brian Anderson, and reporters Allie LaForce and Lauren Shehadi, the latter being from TBS's MLB coverage, to CBS. In turn, CBS announcers Brad Nessler, Andrew Catalon, and Tom McCarthy appear on WBD network broadcasts along with analysts Jim Spanarkel, Bill Raftery, Dan Bonner, Steve Lappas, and Brendan Haywood, as well as reporters Tracy Wolfson, Evan Washburn, AJ Ross, and Jon Rothstein, and rules analyst Gene Steratore. Announcers from other networks like Lisa Byington and Robbie Hummel from Fox, the latter also working for Peacock and Big Ten Network, Jalen Rose from NBC Sports, who also does work for TNT and NBA TV, Debbie Antonelli from ESPN, Jamie Erdahl from NFL Network, and Andy Katz from NCAA.com are also lent to CBS and TNT.

The current contract runs through 2032 and, for the first time in history, provides for the nationwide broadcast each year of all games of the tournament. All First Four games air on truTV. A featured first- or second-round game in each time "window" is broadcast on CBS, while all other games are shown either on TBS, TNT or truTV. The regional semifinals, better known as the Sweet Sixteen, are split between CBS and TBS. CBS had the exclusive rights to the regional finals, also known as the Elite Eight, through 2014. That exclusivity extended to the entire Final Four as well, but after the 2013 tournament Turner Sports elected to exercise a contractual option for 2014 and 2015 giving TBS broadcast rights to the national semifinal matchups. CBS kept its national championship game rights.

Since 2015, CBS and TBS split coverage of the Elite Eight. Since 2016, CBS and TBS alternate coverage of the Final Four and national championship game, with TBS getting the final two rounds in even-numbered years, and CBS getting the games in odd-numbered years. March Madness On Demand would remain unchanged, although Turner was allowed to develop their own service.

== Television ==
Date	Network	Location	Play-by-play announcer	Color commentator(s)	Sideline reporter(s)	Rules analyst(s)	Studio host	Studio analyst(s)
1963	SNI	Freedom Hall (Louisville, Kentucky)	Bill Flemming					
1964	SNI	Municipal Auditorium (Kansas City, Missouri)	Bill Flemming	Keith Jackson				
1965	SNI	Memorial Coliseum (Portland, Oregon)	Bill Flemming					
1966	SNI	Cole Field House (College Park, Maryland)	Bill Flemming	Frank Sims				
1967	SNI	Freedom Hall (Louisville, Kentucky)	Bill Flemming	Frank Sims				
1968	SNI	Los Angeles Memorial Sports Arena (Los Angeles, California)	Bill Flemming	Frank Sims				
1969	NBC	Freedom Hall (Louisville, Kentucky)	Curt Gowdy	Jim Simpson				
1970	NBC	Cole Field House (College Park, Maryland)	Curt Gowdy	Jim Simpson				
1971	NBC	Astrodome (Houston, Texas)	Curt Gowdy	Tom Hawkins				
1972	NBC	Los Angeles Memorial Sports Arena (Los Angeles, California)	Curt Gowdy	Tom Hawkins				
1973	NBC	St. Louis Arena (St. Louis, Missouri)	Curt Gowdy	Tom Hawkins			Jim Simpson	
1974	NBC	Greensboro Coliseum (Greensboro, North Carolina)	Curt Gowdy	Tom Hawkins				
1975	NBC	San Diego Sports Arena (San Diego, California)	Curt Gowdy	Billy Packer	Jim Simpson		Tim Ryan	Al McGuire
1976	NBC	Spectrum (Philadelphia, Pennsylvania)	Dick Enberg	Curt Gowdy	John Wooden		Bryant Gumbel and Lee Leonard	Billy Packer
1977	NBC	The Omni (Atlanta, Georgia)	Curt Gowdy and Dick Enberg	Billy Packer			Bryant Gumbel	
1978	NBC	The Checkerdome (St. Louis, Missouri)	Dick Enberg (Kentucky vs Arkansas and Duke vs Kentucky); Curt Gowdy (Duke vs Notre Dame)	Billy Packer and Al McGuire			Bryant Gumbel	
1979	NBC	Jon M. Huntsman Center (Salt Lake City, Utah)	Dick Enberg	Billy Packer and Al McGuire	John Wooden		Bryant Gumbel	
1980	NBC	Market Square Arena (Indianapolis, Indiana)	Dick Enberg	Billy Packer and Al McGuire	John Wooden		Bryant Gumbel	
1981	NBC	Spectrum (Philadelphia, Pennsylvania)	Dick Enberg	Billy Packer and Al McGuire	John Wooden		Bryant Gumbel	
1982	CBS	Louisiana Superdome (New Orleans, Louisiana)	Gary Bender	Billy Packer			Brent Musburger	
1983	CBS	University Arena (Albuquerque, New Mexico)	Gary Bender	Billy Packer			Brent Musburger	
1984	CBS	Kingdome (Seattle, Washington)	Gary Bender	Billy Packer			Brent Musburger	
1985	CBS	Rupp Arena (Lexington, Kentucky)	Brent Musburger	Billy Packer			Dick Stockton	
1986	CBS	Reunion Arena (Dallas, Texas)	Brent Musburger	Billy Packer			Jim Nantz	
1987	CBS	Louisiana Superdome (New Orleans, Louisiana)	Brent Musburger	Billy Packer	James Brown		Jim Nantz	
1988	CBS	Kemper Arena (Kansas City, Missouri)	Brent Musburger	Billy Packer	James Brown		Jim Nantz	
1989	CBS	Kingdome (Seattle, Washington)	Brent Musburger	Billy Packer	Lesley Visser and James Brown		Jim Nantz and James Brown	
1990	CBS	McNichols Sports Arena (Denver, Colorado)	Brent Musburger	Billy Packer	Lesley Visser		Jim Nantz	Mike Francesa
1991	CBS	Hoosier Dome (Indianapolis, Indiana)	Jim Nantz	Billy Packer	Lesley Visser and James Brown		Pat O'Brien	Mike Francesa
1992	CBS	Metrodome (Minneapolis, Minnesota)	Jim Nantz	Billy Packer	Lesley Visser and James Brown		Pat O'Brien	Mike Francesa
1993	CBS	Louisiana Superdome (New Orleans, Louisiana)	Jim Nantz	Billy Packer	Lesley Visser and Jim Gray		Pat O'Brien	John Thompson (Semifinals only) and Mike Krzyzewski
1994	CBS	Charlotte Coliseum (Charlotte, North Carolina)	Jim Nantz	Billy Packer	Jim Gray		Pat O'Brien	Rick Pitino (Semifinals only) and Dean Smith
1995	CBS	Kingdome (Seattle, Washington)	Jim Nantz	Billy Packer	Michele Tafoya		Pat O'Brien	Mike Krzyzewski, Quinn Buckner and John Wooden
1996	CBS	Continental Airlines Arena (East Rutherford, New Jersey)	Jim Nantz	Billy Packer	Michele Tafoya and Andrea Joyce		Pat O'Brien	Quinn Buckner, Mike Krzyzewski and Jim Harrick
1997	CBS	RCA Dome (Indianapolis, Indiana)	Jim Nantz	Billy Packer	Michele Tafoya and Andrea Joyce		Pat O'Brien	Clark Kellogg and Mike Krzyzewski
1998	CBS	Alamodome (San Antonio, Texas)	Jim Nantz	Billy Packer	Michele Tafoya and Armen Keteyian		Greg Gumbel	Clark Kellogg and Dean Smith
1999	CBS	Tropicana Field (St. Petersburg, Florida)	Jim Nantz	Billy Packer	Bonnie Bernstein and Armen Keteyian		Greg Gumbel	Clark Kellogg and Rick Majerus
2000	CBS	RCA Dome (Indianapolis, Indiana)	Jim Nantz	Billy Packer	Bonnie Bernstein and Armen Keteyian		Greg Gumbel	Clark Kellogg and Bobby Cremins
2001	CBS	Metrodome (Minneapolis, Minnesota)	Jim Nantz	Billy Packer	Bonnie Bernstein and Armen Keteyian		Greg Gumbel	Clark Kellogg and Bill Walton
2002	CBS	Georgia Dome (Atlanta, Georgia)	Jim Nantz	Billy Packer	Bonnie Bernstein and Armen Keteyian		Greg Gumbel	Clark Kellogg
2003	CBS	Louisiana Superdome (New Orleans, Louisiana)	Jim Nantz	Billy Packer	Bonnie Bernstein and Armen Keteyian		Greg Gumbel	Clark Kellogg and Tom Izzo
2004	CBS	Alamodome (San Antonio, Texas)	Jim Nantz	Billy Packer	Bonnie Bernstein and Armen Keteyian		Greg Gumbel	Clark Kellogg and Seth Davis
2005	CBS	Edward Jones Dome (St. Louis, Missouri)	Jim Nantz	Billy Packer	Bonnie Bernstein and Armen Keteyian		Greg Gumbel	Clark Kellogg and Seth Davis
2006	CBS	RCA Dome (Indianapolis, Indiana)	Jim Nantz	Billy Packer	Dan Bonner		Greg Gumbel	Clark Kellogg and Seth Davis
2007	CBS	Georgia Dome (Atlanta, Georgia)	Jim Nantz	Billy Packer	Sam Ryan		Greg Gumbel	Clark Kellogg and Seth Davis
2008	CBS	Alamodome (San Antonio, Texas)	Jim Nantz	Billy Packer	Sam Ryan		Greg Gumbel	Clark Kellogg and Seth Davis
2009	CBS	Ford Field (Detroit, Michigan)	Jim Nantz	Clark Kellogg	Tracy Wolfson		Greg Gumbel	Greg Anthony and Seth Davis
2010	CBS	Lucas Oil Stadium (Indianapolis, Indiana)	Jim Nantz	Clark Kellogg	Tracy Wolfson		Greg Gumbel	Greg Anthony and Seth Davis
2011	CBS	Reliant Stadium (Houston, Texas)	Jim Nantz	Clark Kellogg and Steve Kerr	Tracy Wolfson		Greg Gumbel	Greg Anthony, Seth Davis, Kenny Smith, and Charles Barkley
2012	CBS	Mercedes-Benz Superdome (New Orleans, Louisiana)	Jim Nantz	Clark Kellogg and Steve Kerr	Tracy Wolfson		Greg Gumbel	Greg Anthony, Seth Davis, Kenny Smith, and Charles Barkley
2013	CBS	Georgia Dome (Atlanta, Georgia)	Jim Nantz	Clark Kellogg and Steve Kerr	Tracy Wolfson		Greg Gumbel	Greg Anthony, Doug Gottlieb, Kenny Smith, and Charles Barkley
2014	CBS (championship game); TBS (national semifinals)	AT&T Stadium (Arlington, Texas)	Jim Nantz	Greg Anthony and Steve Kerr	Tracy Wolfson		Greg Gumbel and Ernie Johnson	Clark Kellogg, Kenny Smith, Charles Barkley, Seth Davis, Grant Hill, and Reggie Miller
2015	CBS (championship game); TBS (national semifinals)	Lucas Oil Stadium (Indianapolis, Indiana)	Jim Nantz	Bill Raftery and Grant Hill	Tracy Wolfson		Greg Gumbel and Ernie Johnson	Clark Kellogg, Kenny Smith, Charles Barkley, Seth Davis, Grant Hill, and Reggie Miller
2016	TBS	NRG Stadium (Houston, Texas)	Jim Nantz	Bill Raftery and Grant Hill	Tracy Wolfson		Greg Gumbel and Ernie Johnson	Clark Kellogg, Kenny Smith, Charles Barkley, Seth Davis, Steve Smith, and Reggie Miller
2017	CBS	University of Phoenix Stadium (Glendale, Arizona)	Jim Nantz	Bill Raftery and Grant Hill	Tracy Wolfson		Greg Gumbel and Ernie Johnson	Clark Kellogg, Kenny Smith, Charles Barkley, Seth Davis, Steve Smith, and Jay Wright
2018	TBS	Alamodome (San Antonio, Texas)	Jim Nantz	Bill Raftery and Grant Hill	Tracy Wolfson		Greg Gumbel and Ernie Johnson	Clark Kellogg, Kenny Smith, Charles Barkley, Seth Davis, Brendan Haywood, Candace Parker, Christian Laettner, Danny Manning, and Kris Jenkins
2019	CBS	U.S. Bank Stadium (Minneapolis, Minnesota)	Jim Nantz	Bill Raftery and Grant Hill	Tracy Wolfson	Gene Steratore	Greg Gumbel and Ernie Johnson	Clark Kellogg, Kenny Smith, Charles Barkley, Seth Davis, Candace Parker, Wally Szczerbiak, and Jay Wright
2020	Not held because of the COVID-19 pandemic							
2021	CBS	Lucas Oil Stadium (Indianapolis, Indiana)	Jim Nantz	Bill Raftery and Grant Hill	Tracy Wolfson	Gene Steratore	Greg Gumbel and Ernie Johnson	Clark Kellogg, Kenny Smith, Charles Barkley, Seth Davis, Candace Parker, and Jim Jackson
2022	TBS; TNT truTV	Caesars Superdome (New Orleans, Louisiana)	Jim Nantz	Bill Raftery and Grant Hill	Tracy Wolfson	Gene Steratore	Greg Gumbel and Ernie Johnson	Clark Kellogg, Kenny Smith, Charles Barkley, Seth Davis, Candace Parker, and Bobby Hurley
2023	CBS	NRG Stadium (Houston, Texas)	Jim Nantz	Bill Raftery and Grant Hill	Tracy Wolfson	Gene Steratore	Greg Gumbel and Ernie Johnson	Clark Kellogg, Kenny Smith, Charles Barkley, Jay Wright, Seth Davis, and Candace Parker
2024	TBS; TNT truTV	State Farm Stadium (Glendale, Arizona)	Ian Eagle	Bill Raftery and Grant Hill	Tracy Wolfson	Gene Steratore	Ernie Johnson and Adam Lefkoe	Clark Kellogg, Kenny Smith, Charles Barkley, Jay Wright, Seth Davis, and Candace Parker
2025	CBS	Alamodome (San Antonio, Texas)	Ian Eagle	Bill Raftery and Grant Hill	Tracy Wolfson	Gene Steratore	Ernie Johnson and Adam Zucker	Clark Kellogg, Kenny Smith, Charles Barkley, Jay Wright, Seth Davis, Wally Szczerbiak, and Jalen Rose
2026	TBS; TNT truTV	Lucas Oil Stadium (Indianapolis, Indiana)	Ian Eagle	Bill Raftery and Grant Hill	Tracy Wolfson	Gene Steratore	Ernie Johnson and Adam Lefkoe	Clark Kellogg, Kenny Smith, Charles Barkley, Bruce Pearl, Jamal Mashburn, Jalen Rose, Chris Webber, and Candace Parker

=== Notes ===
==== 1960s ====
- In 1962, ABC showed the NCAA Championship Game on a one-day delayed basis, as part of Wide World of Sports.
- From 1969 to 1972, both the Consolation (3rd place) Game and the Championship Game were televised on Saturday afternoon as a doubleheader. In 1969 and 1970, Curt Gowdy and Jim Simpson reversed roles for the telecast; Gowdy called the title game and Simpson earlier called the "consy." In 1973, the final was moved to Monday night, and the consy was no longer televised. In 1982, the consy game was dropped altogether.
- Prior to 1969, the NCAA Championship was never on live network television. However, the one-time rival NIT tourney had been on CBS for many years in the 1960s and well into the 1970s. Before the NCAA allowed conferences to receive multiple bids in 1975, the NIT fielded some high-quality tournaments.

==== 1970s ====
- In 1976, Dick Enberg and Billy Packer called the first game while Packer teamed with Curt Gowdy for the second game. For the Championship Game, Dick Enberg and Curt Gowdy called it while NBC used Billy Packer as a studio analyst.
- The 1979 championship game between Larry Bird's Indiana State Sycamores and Magic Johnson's Michigan State Spartans to this day, remains the highest-rated game in the history of televised college basketball.

==== 1980s ====
- 1982 marked the first year that the Selection Show was broadcast.
- 1987 marked the first year that CBS used the song "One Shining Moment" for its tournament epilogue.
- In 1989, Lesley Visser became the first woman to cover the Final Four.

==== 1990s ====
- The 1990 Championship Game marked Brent Musburger's final assignment for CBS Sports as he was dismissed (under great controversy) just a day earlier (April 1).
- CBS did not use a sideline reporter for the 1994 Championship Game.

==== 2000s ====
- In 2008, CBS' studio team did not travel to the Final Four site. Instead, Greg Gumbel, Clark Kellogg and Seth Davis remained at the CBS Broadcast Center in New York City.
- Clark Kellogg replaced Billy Packer as CBS' lead basketball color commentator for the 2008–2009 college basketball season and called the 2009 NCAA Final Four.

==== 2010s ====
- Despite CBS' contract to carry the tournament until 2013, the NCAA had the option of ending the agreement after the 2010 championship. This led to speculation that ESPN would snag the rights to future tournament games. However, on April 22, 2010, the NCAA signed a 14-year agreement with CBS and Turner Broadcasting System worth more than $10.8 billion, allowing CBS to continue airing the entire regional finals through the national championship, with CBS and Turner splitting coverage of earlier rounds in the now 68-team field. After 2015, the regional finals will be shared and the Final Four and National Championship alternating between CBS and TBS.
- In 2014, Turner introduced team centric alternate broadcasts during the Final Four, called Team Stream. The broadcasters were as follows:
  - David Steele/Mark Wise/James Bates – Florida Teamcast on TNT
  - Eric Frede/Donny Marshall/Swin Cash UConn Teamcast on truTV
  - Rob Bromley/Rex Chapman/Dave Baker Kentucky Teamcast on TNT
  - Wayne Larrivee/Mike Kelley/Phil Dawson Wisconsin Teamcast on truTV
- In 2015, the Team Stream broadcasters were as follows:
  - Tom Werme/Alaa Abdelnaby/Chris Spatola – Duke Team Stream on TNT
  - Brian Anderson/Mateen Cleaves/Shireen Saski – Michigan State Team Stream on truTV
  - Dave Baker/Rex Chapman/Michael Eaves – Kentucky Team Stream on TNT
  - Wayne Larrivee/Mike Kelley/Phil Dawson – Wisconsin Team Stream on truTV
- In 2016 the Team Stream broadcasts were extended to the National Championship game. The Team Stream broadcasters were as follows:
  - Chad McKee/Eduardo Nájera/Jessica Coody – Oklahoma Team Stream on TNT
  - Scott Graham/Brian Finneran/Kacie McDonnell – Villanova Team Stream on truTV
  - Wes Durham/Brendan Haywood/Dwayne Ballen – North Carolina Team Stream on TNT
  - Tom Werme/Roosevelt Bouie/Donovan McNabb – Syracuse Team Stream on truTV
- In 2017 there was no Team Stream. In 2018 the Team Stream broadcasters were as follows:
  - Matt Park/Jay Feely/Dr. Sanjay Gupta – Michigan Team Stream on TNT
  - Jeff Hagedorn/Jerry Harkness/Shams Charania – Loyola–Chicago Team Stream on truTV
  - Dave Armstrong/Scot Pollard/Rob Riggle– Kansas Team Stream on TNT
  - Scott Graham/Randy Foye/Kacie McDonnell – Villanova Team Stream on truTV

==== 2020s ====
- There was no coverage in 2020, due to the NCAA cancelling that year's tournament due to concerns about the coronavirus pandemic.
- † Expected announcer, subject to change.

=== See also ===
- NCAA Men's Division I Basketball Championship#Television
- Men's college basketball on television

== Radio ==
=== National ===
Date	Network	Location	Play-by-play announcer	Color commentator(s)	Sideline reporter(s)	Studio host	Studio analyst(s)
1979	NBC Radio	Special Events Center (Salt Lake City, Utah)	Cawood Ledford	Bobby Knight	Jack O’Rourke		
1982	CBS Radio	Louisiana Superdome (New Orleans, Louisiana)	Cawood Ledford	Curt Gowdy			
1983	CBS Radio	University Arena (Albuquerque, New Mexico)	Cawood Ledford	Curt Gowdy	Jim Kelly		
1984	CBS Radio	Kingdome (Seattle, Washington)	Dick Stockton (semifinal and championship); John Rooney (semifinal)	Dave Gavitt and Curt Gowdy			
1985	CBS Radio	Rupp Arena (Lexington, Kentucky)	Cawood Ledford (semifinal and championship); John Rooney (semifinal)	Dave Gavitt and Curt Gowdy			
1989	CBS Radio	Kingdome (Seattle, Washington)	Cawood Ledford (semifinal and championship); John Rooney (semifinal)	Ron Franklin (semifinal); Quinn Buckner (semifinal and championship)		Ron Franklin	
1990	CBS Radio	McNichols Sports Arena (Denver, Colorado)	Cawood Ledford (semifinal and championship); John Rooney (semifinal)	Ron Franklin (semifinal); Quinn Buckner (semifinal and championship)		Ron Franklin	
1991	CBS Radio	Hoosier Dome (Indianapolis, Indiana)	Cawood Ledford (semifinal and championship); John Rooney (semifinal)	Ron Franklin (semifinal); Quinn Buckner (semifinal and championship)			
1992	CBS Radio	Hubert H. Humphrey Metrodome (Minneapolis, Minnesota)	Cawood Ledford (semifinal and championship); John Rooney (semifinal)	Quinn Buckner			
1993	CBS Radio	Louisiana Superdome (New Orleans, Louisiana)	John Rooney	Bill Raftery			
1994	CBS Radio	Charlotte Coliseum (Charlotte, North Carolina)	John Rooney	Bill Raftery			
1995	CBS Radio	Kingdome (Seattle, Washington)	John Rooney (UCLA-Oklahoma State and Championship Game); Marty Brennaman (Arkansas-North Carolina)	Bill Raftery (UCLA-Oklahoma State and Championship Game); Ron Franklin (Arkansas-North Carolina)			
1996	CBS Radio	Continental Airlines Arena (East Rutherford, New Jersey)	John Rooney (semifinal and championship); Marty Brennaman (semifinal)	Bill Raftery (semifinal and championship); Ron Franklin (semifinal)			
1997	CBS Radio	RCA Dome (Indianapolis, Indiana)	John Rooney (semifinal and championship); Marty Brennaman (semifinal)	Bill Raftery (semifinal and championship); Ron Franklin (semifinal)			
1998	Westwood One	Alamodome (San Antonio, Texas)	John Rooney (semifinal and championship); Marty Brennaman (semifinal)	Bill Raftery (Semifinal and Championship); Ron Franklin (Semifinal)			
1999	Westwood One	Tropicana Field (St. Petersburg, Florida)	John Rooney (Duke-Michigan State and Connecticut-Duke); Marty Brennaman (Connecticut-Ohio State)	Bill Raftery (Duke-Michigan State and Connecticut-Duke); Ron Franklin (Connecticut-Ohio State)		Ron Franklin	
2000	Westwood One	RCA Dome (Indianapolis, Indiana)	John Rooney (semifinal and championship); Marty Brennaman (semifinal)	Bill Raftery (semifinal and championship); Dave Gavitt (semifinal)		Tommy Tighe	
2001	Westwood One	Metrodome (Minneapolis, Minnesota)	John Rooney (semifinal and championship); Marty Brennaman (semifinal)	Bill Raftery (semifinal and championship); Dave Gavitt (semifinal)		Tommy Tighe	
2002	Westwood One	Georgia Dome (Atlanta, Georgia)	John Rooney (semifinal and championship); Marty Brennaman (semifinal)	Bill Raftery (semifinal and championship); Ron Franklin (semifinal)	Jim Gray	Dave Sims	
2003	Westwood One	Louisiana Superdome (New Orleans, Louisiana)	Kevin Harlan	John Thompson and Bill Raftery	Jim Gray		
2004	Westwood One	Alamodome (San Antonio, Texas)	Kevin Harlan	John Thompson and Bill Raftery	Jim Gray		
2005	Westwood One	Edward Jones Dome (St. Louis, Missouri)	Kevin Harlan	John Thompson and Bill Raftery	Jim Gray	John Tautges	
2006	Westwood One	RCA Dome (Indianapolis, Indiana)	Kevin Harlan	John Thompson and Bill Raftery	Jim Gray	John Tautges	
2007	Westwood One	Georgia Dome (Atlanta, Georgia)	Kevin Harlan	John Thompson and Bill Raftery	Jim Gray	Tommy Tighe	
2008	Westwood One	Alamodome (San Antonio, Texas)	Kevin Kugler	John Thompson and Bill Raftery	Jim Gray	Tommy Tighe	
2009	Westwood One	Ford Field (Detroit, Michigan)	Kevin Kugler	John Thompson and Bill Raftery	Jim Gray	Tommy Tighe	
2010	Westwood One	Lucas Oil Stadium (Indianapolis, Indiana)	Kevin Kugler	John Thompson and Bill Raftery	Jim Gray	John Tautges	Bill Walton
2011	Westwood One	Reliant Stadium (Houston, Texas)	Kevin Kugler	John Thompson and Bill Raftery	Jim Gray	John Tautges	Bill Walton
2012	Dial Global	Mercedes-Benz Superdome (New Orleans, Louisiana)	Kevin Kugler	John Thompson and Bill Raftery	Jim Gray	John Tautges	Bill Walton
2013	Dial Global	Georgia Dome (Atlanta, Georgia)	Kevin Kugler	John Thompson and Bill Raftery	Jim Gray	John Tautges	Bill Walton
2014	Westwood One	AT&T Stadium (Arlington, Texas)	Kevin Kugler	John Thompson and Bill Raftery	Jim Gray	Jason Horowitz	Bill Walton
2015	Westwood One	Lucas Oil Stadium (Indianapolis, Indiana)	Kevin Kugler	Clark Kellogg	Jim Gray	Jason Horowitz	Bill Walton
2016	Westwood One	NRG Stadium (Houston, Texas)	Kevin Kugler	John Thompson and Clark Kellogg	Jim Gray	Jason Horowitz	Bill Walton
2017	Westwood One	University of Phoenix Stadium (Glendale, Arizona)	Kevin Kugler	Clark Kellogg	Jim Gray	Jason Horowitz	Bill Walton
2018	Westwood One	Alamodome (San Antonio, Texas)	Kevin Kugler	John Thompson and Clark Kellogg	Jim Gray	Jason Horowitz	Bill Walton
2019	Westwood One	U.S. Bank Stadium (Minneapolis, Minnesota)	Kevin Kugler	John Thompson and Clark Kellogg	Jim Gray	Jason Horowitz	Bill Walton
2020	Not held because of the COVID-19 pandemic						
2021	Westwood One	Lucas Oil Stadium (Indianapolis, Indiana)	Kevin Kugler	Jim Jackson and P. J. Carlesimo	Jim Gray	Jason Horowitz	
2022	Westwood One	Caesars Superdome (New Orleans, Louisiana)	Kevin Kugler	P. J. Carlesimo and Clark Kellogg	Andy Katz	Jason Horowitz	Bill Walton and Doug Gottlieb
2023	Westwood One	NRG Stadium (Houston, Texas)	Kevin Kugler	Jim Jackson and Clark Kellogg	Andy Katz	Jason Horowitz	Bill Walton, P. J. Carlesimo, and Doug Gottlieb
2024	Westwood One	State Farm Stadium (Glendale, Arizona)	Kevin Kugler	Jim Jackson and Clark Kellogg	Andy Katz	Jason Horowitz	P. J. Carlesimo and Doug Gottlieb
2025	Westwood One	Alamodome (San Antonio, Texas)	Kevin Kugler	Robbie Hummel and P. J. Carlesimo	Andy Katz	Jason Horowitz	Doug Gottlieb
2026	Westwood One	Lucas Oil Stadium (Indianapolis, Indiana)	Kevin Kugler	Robbie Hummel and P. J. Carlesimo	Andy Katz	Jason Horowitz	Nick Bahe

== See also ==
- List of NCAA Women's Final Four broadcasters
