= List of NCAA March Madness commentary crews for CBS/TNT Sports =

== 2026 ==
- Studio Hosts: Nate Burleson (New York), Adam Lefkoe (Atlanta), Adam Zucker (New York), Ernie Johnson Jr. (Indianapolis; Final Four and National Championship), and Jamie Erdahl (In-game updates)
- Studio Analysts: Clark Kellogg, Charles Barkley, Kenny Smith, Renee Montgomery, Bruce Pearl, Seth Davis (New York), Seth Davis, Bruce Pearl, Jamal Mashburn, and Jalen Rose (Atlanta)
- Rules Analyst: Gene Steratore
1. Ian Eagle/Bill Raftery and Grant Hill/Tracy Wolfson
2. Brian Anderson or Jason Benetti (Round of 64)/Jim Jackson/Allie LaForce
3. Kevin Harlan/Robbie Hummel and Stan Van Gundy/Lauren Shehadi
4. Andrew Catalon/Steve Lappas/Evan Washburn
5. Brad Nessler/Wally Szczerbiak/Jared Greenberg
6. Spero Dedes/Jim Spanarkel/Jon Rothstein
7. Tom McCarthy/Candace Parker/Dan Bonner/AJ Ross
8. Brandon Gaudin/Chris Webber/Andy Katz
9. Jordan Kent/Jim Spanarkel/Jenny Dell (First Four only)
10. Brian Anderson/Charles Barkley/Dick Vitale/Jenny Dell (First Four only)

== 2025 ==
- Studio Hosts: Ernie Johnson Jr. (New York), Adam Lefkoe (Atlanta), Adam Zucker (New York), and Jamie Erdahl (In-game updates)
- Studio Analysts: Clark Kellogg, Charles Barkley, Kenny Smith, Wally Szczerbiak (New York), Jay Wright, Seth Davis, Candace Parker, and Jalen Rose (First Four) (Atlanta)
- Rules Analyst: Gene Steratore
1. Ian Eagle/Bill Raftery and Grant Hill/Tracy Wolfson
2. Brian Anderson/Jim Jackson/Allie LaForce
3. Kevin Harlan/Dan Bonner and Stan Van Gundy/Lauren Shehadi
4. Andrew Catalon/Steve Lappas/Evan Washburn
5. Brad Nessler/Brendan Haywood/Dana Jacobson
6. Spero Dedes/Jim Spanarkel/Jon Rothstein
7. Lisa Byington/Robbie Hummel and Jalen Rose/Andy Katz
8. Tom McCarthy/Debbie Antonelli and Steve Smith/AJ Ross

== 2024 ==
- Studio Hosts: Ernie Johnson Jr. (New York), Adam Lefkoe (Atlanta), Adam Zucker (New York), Jamie Erdahl (In-game updates)
- Studio Analysts: Clark Kellogg, Charles Barkley, Kenny Smith, Wally Szczerbiak (New York), Seth Davis, Jay Wright, Candace Parker (Atlanta)
- Rules Analyst: Gene Steratore
1. Ian Eagle/Bill Raftery and Grant Hill/Tracy Wolfson
2. Brian Anderson/Jim Jackson/Allie LaForce
3. Kevin Harlan/Dan Bonner and Stan Van Gundy/Andy Katz
4. Andrew Catalon/Steve Lappas/Evan Washburn
5. Brad Nessler/Brendan Haywood/Dana Jacobson
6. Spero Dedes/Jim Spanarkel/Jon Rothstein
7. Lisa Byington/Steve Smith and Robbie Hummel/Lauren Shehadi
8. Tom McCarthy/Debbie Antonelli and Avery Johnson/AJ Ross

== 2023 ==
- Studio Hosts: Greg Gumbel (New York), Ernie Johnson Jr. (Atlanta), Adam Lefkoe (Atlanta), Adam Zucker (New York/In-game updates)
- Studio Analysts: Clark Kellogg, Charles Barkley, Kenny Smith, Wally Szczerbiak (New York), Seth Davis, Jay Wright, Candace Parker (Atlanta)
- Rules Analyst: Gene Steratore
1. Jim Nantz/Bill Raftery and Grant Hill/Tracy Wolfson
2. Ian Eagle/Jim Spanarkel/Evan Washburn
3. Brian Anderson/Jim Jackson/Allie LaForce
4. Kevin Harlan/Dan Bonner and Stan Van Gundy/Lauren Shehadi
5. Andrew Catalon/Steve Lappas/Jamie Erdahl
6. Brad Nessler/Brendan Haywood/Dana Jacobson
7. Spero Dedes/Debbie Antonelli/AJ Ross
8. Lisa Byington/Steve Smith and Avery Johnson/Andy Katz
9. Tom McCarthy/Avery Johnson/Jon Rothstein (First Four only)

== 2022 ==
- Studio Hosts: Greg Gumbel and Ernie Johnson Jr. (New York), Nabil Karim (Atlanta), Adam Lefkoe (In-game updates)
- Studio Analysts: Clark Kellogg, Charles Barkley, Kenny Smith, Wally Szczerbiak (New York), Seth Davis, Candace Parker, Dwyane Wade, Rex Chapman (Atlanta)
- Rules Analyst: Gene Steratore
1. Jim Nantz/Bill Raftery and Grant Hill/Tracy Wolfson
2. Ian Eagle/Jim Spanarkel/Jamie Erdahl
3. Brian Anderson/Jim Jackson/Allie LaForce
4. Kevin Harlan/Dan Bonner and Reggie Miller/Dana Jacobson
5. Andrew Catalon/Steve Lappas/Andy Katz
6. Brad Nessler/Brendan Haywood/Evan Washburn
7. Spero Dedes/Debbie Antonelli/AJ Ross
8. Lisa Byington/Steve Smith and Avery Johnson/Lauren Shehadi
9. Tom McCarthy/Steve Lavin and Avery Johnson/Jon Rothstein (First Four only)

== 2021 ==
- Studio Hosts: Greg Gumbel (New York), Ernie Johnson Jr. (Atlanta), Adam Zucker (New York/In-game updates), Matt Winer (In-game updates)
- Studio Analysts: Clark Kellogg, Seth Davis, Wally Szczerbiak (New York), Charles Barkley, Kenny Smith, Andy Katz (Atlanta), Candace Parker, Jim Jackson (Final Four)
- Rules Analyst: Gene Steratore
1. Jim Nantz/Bill Raftery and Grant Hill (Sweet 16, Elite 8, Final Four, and National Championship Game)/Tracy Wolfson
2. Brian Anderson/Jim Jackson/Allie LaForce
3. Ian Eagle/Grant Hill (1st & 2nd Rounds) or Jim Spanarkel (Regionals)/Jamie Erdahl
4. Kevin Harlan/Dan Bonner/Dana Jacobson
5. Brad Nessler/Steve Lavin and Avery Johnson (First Four only)/Evan Washburn
6. Spero Dedes/Brendan Haywood/Lauren Shehadi
7. Andrew Catalon/Steve Lappas/AJ Ross
8. Carter Blackburn/Debbie Antonelli/Evan Washburn, Dana Jacobson or Lauren Shehadi
9. Lisa Byington/Steve Smith/AJ Ross or Lauren Shehadi
10. Tom McCarthy/Avery Johnson/AJ Ross or Lauren Shehadi

== 2020 ==
This event was cancelled due to the COVID-19 pandemic.

== 2019 ==
- Studio Hosts: Greg Gumbel and Ernie Johnson Jr. (New York), Casey Stern (Atlanta), Adam Zucker (In-game updates)
- Studio Analysts: Clark Kellogg, Charles Barkley, Kenny Smith, Seth Davis, Wally Szczerbiak, Candace Parker and Brendan Haywood
- Rules Analyst: Gene Steratore
1. Jim Nantz/Bill Raftery and Grant Hill/Tracy Wolfson
2. Brian Anderson/Chris Webber/Allie LaForce
3. Ian Eagle/Jim Spanarkel/Jamie Erdahl
4. Kevin Harlan/Reggie Miller and Dan Bonner/Dana Jacobson
5. Brad Nessler/Steve Lavin and Jim Jackson/Evan Washburn
6. Spero Dedes/Steve Smith and Len Elmore or Jim Jackson (First Four)/Rosalyn Gold-Onwude
7. Andrew Catalon/Steve Lappas/Lisa Byington
8. Carter Blackburn/Debbie Antonelli/John Schriffen

== 2018 ==
- Studio Hosts: Greg Gumbel and Ernie Johnson Jr. (New York), Casey Stern (Atlanta)
- Studio Analysts: Clark Kellogg, Charles Barkley, Kenny Smith, Seth Davis, Wally Szczerbiak, Candace Parker and Brendan Haywood
1. Jim Nantz/Bill Raftery and Grant Hill/Tracy Wolfson
2. Brian Anderson/Chris Webber/Lisa Byington
3. Ian Eagle/Jim Spanarkel/Allie LaForce
4. Kevin Harlan/Reggie Miller and Dan Bonner/Dana Jacobson
5. Brad Nessler/Steve Lavin/Evan Washburn
6. Spero Dedes/Steve Smith and Len Elmore/Rosalyn Gold-Onwude
7. Andrew Catalon/Steve Lappas/Jamie Erdahl
8. Carter Blackburn/Debbie Antonelli/John Schriffen

== 2017 ==
- Studio Hosts: Greg Gumbel and Ernie Johnson Jr. (New York), Casey Stern (Atlanta), and Adam Zucker (Final Four)
- Studio Analysts: Clark Kellogg, Charles Barkley, Kenny Smith, Seth Davis, Wally Szczerbiak, Bruce Pearl, Brendan Haywood, and Jay Wright (Final Four)
1. Jim Nantz/Bill Raftery and Grant Hill/Tracy Wolfson
2. Brian Anderson/Chris Webber or Clark Kellogg (First Four)/Lewis Johnson
3. Verne Lundquist/Jim Spanarkel/Allie LaForce
4. Kevin Harlan/Reggie Miller and Dan Bonner/Dana Jacobson
5. Ian Eagle/Steve Lavin/Evan Washburn
6. Spero Dedes/Steve Smith and Len Elmore/Rosalyn Gold-Onwude
7. Andrew Catalon/Steve Lappas/Jamie Erdahl
8. Carter Blackburn/Mike Gminski and Debbie Antonelli/Lisa Byington

== 2016 ==
- Studio Hosts: Greg Gumbel and Ernie Johnson Jr. (New York), Matt Winer (Atlanta)
- Studio Analysts: Clark Kellogg, Charles Barkley, Kenny Smith, Seth Davis, Wally Szczerbiak and Swin Cash
1. Jim Nantz/Bill Raftery and Grant Hill/Tracy Wolfson
2. Brian Anderson/Steve Smith/Dana Jacobson
3. Verne Lundquist/Jim Spanarkel/Allie LaForce
4. Kevin Harlan/Reggie Miller and Dan Bonner/Lewis Johnson
5. Ian Eagle/Chris Webber and Len Elmore/Evan Washburn
6. Spero Dedes/Doug Gottlieb/Rosalyn Gold-Onwude
7. Andrew Catalon/Steve Lappas/Jamie Erdahl
8. Carter Blackburn/Mike Gminski/Jaime Maggio

== 2015 ==
- Studio Hosts: Greg Gumbel and Ernie Johnson Jr. (New York), Matt Winer (Atlanta)
- Studio Analysts: Clark Kellogg, Charles Barkley, Kenny Smith, Steve Smith, Seth Davis, Mateen Cleaves and Wally Szczerbiak
1. Jim Nantz/Bill Raftery and Grant Hill/Tracy Wolfson
2. Marv Albert or Brian Anderson (Regional Finals)/Chris Webber and Len Elmore/Lewis Johnson
3. Verne Lundquist/Jim Spanarkel/Allie LaForce
4. Kevin Harlan/Reggie Miller and Dan Bonner/Rachel Nichols
5. Ian Eagle/Doug Gottlieb/Evan Washburn
6. Brian Anderson/Steve Smith/Dana Jacobson or Lewis Johnson (First Four)
7. Spero Dedes/Mike Gminski/Jaime Maggio
8. Andrew Catalon/Steve Lappas/Jamie Erdahl

== 2014 ==
Note: Steve Kerr joined Jim Nantz and Greg Anthony for the Final Four and national championship game.

- Studio Hosts: Greg Gumbel and Ernie Johnson Jr. (New York), Matt Winer (Atlanta)
- Studio Analysts: Clark Kellogg, Charles Barkley, Kenny Smith, Grant Hill, Seth Davis, Mateen Cleaves and Steve Smith
1. Jim Nantz/Greg Anthony/Tracy Wolfson
2. Marv Albert/Steve Kerr/Craig Sager
3. Verne Lundquist/Bill Raftery/Allie LaForce
4. Kevin Harlan/Reggie Miller and Len Elmore/Rachel Nichols
5. Ian Eagle/Jim Spanarkel/Lewis Johnson
6. Brian Anderson/Dan Bonner/Kristine Leahy
7. Spero Dedes/Doug Gottlieb/Jaime Maggio
8. Andrew Catalon/Mike Gminski/Otis Livingston

== 2013 ==
- Studio Hosts: Greg Gumbel and Ernie Johnson Jr. (New York), Matt Winer (Atlanta)
- Studio Analysts: Greg Anthony, Charles Barkley, and Kenny Smith (New York); Rex Chapman, Seth Davis and Steve Smith (Atlanta)
1. Jim Nantz/Clark Kellogg/Tracy Wolfson
2. Marv Albert/Steve Kerr/Craig Sager
3. Verne Lundquist/Bill Raftery/Rachel Nichols
4. Kevin Harlan/Reggie Miller and Len Elmore/Lewis Johnson
5. Ian Eagle/Jim Spanarkel/Allie LaForce
6. Brian Anderson/Dan Bonner/Marty Snider
7. Tim Brando/Mike Gminski/Otis Livingston
8. Spero Dedes/Doug Gottlieb/Jaime Maggio

== 2012 ==
- Studio Hosts: Greg Gumbel and Ernie Johnson Jr. (New York), Matt Winer (Atlanta)
- Studio Analysts: Greg Anthony, Charles Barkley, and Kenny Smith (New York), Seth Davis and Steve Smith (Atlanta)
1. Jim Nantz/Clark Kellogg/Tracy Wolfson
2. Marv Albert/Steve Kerr/Craig Sager
3. Verne Lundquist/Bill Raftery/Lesley Visser
4. Kevin Harlan/Reggie Miller and Len Elmore/Marty Snider
5. Ian Eagle/Jim Spanarkel/Lewis Johnson
6. Brian Anderson/Dan Bonner/David Aldridge
7. Tim Brando/Mike Gminski/Otis Livingston
8. Spero Dedes/Bob Wenzel/Jaime Maggio

== 2011 ==
- Studio Hosts: Greg Gumbel and Ernie Johnson Jr. (New York), and Matt Winer (Atlanta)
- Studio Analysts: Greg Anthony, Charles Barkley, and Kenny Smith (New York), Seth Davis and Steve Smith (Atlanta)
1. Jim Nantz/Clark Kellogg/Tracy Wolfson
2. Marv Albert/Steve Kerr/Craig Sager
3. Verne Lundquist/Bill Raftery/Lesley Visser
4. Gus Johnson/Len Elmore/Marty Snider
5. Kevin Harlan/Reggie Miller and Dan Bonner/Sam Ryan
6. Ian Eagle/Jim Spanarkel/David Aldridge
7. Tim Brando/Mike Gminski/Lewis Johnson
8. Spero Dedes/Bob Wenzel/Jaime Maggio
