= College Basketball on ABC =

- Genre: College basketball telecasts
- Country of origin: United States
- Original language: English
- No. of seasons: 24

Production
- Camera setup: Multi-camera
- Running time: 120 minutes or until end of game
- Production companies: ABC Sports; Raycom Sports; ESPN

Original release
- Network: ABC; ESPN+ (2018–present); Disney+ (2024–present)
- Release: January 18, 1987 – present

Related
- ESPN College Basketball

ABC first broadcast selected college basketball games of the now-NCAA Division I during the 1960s and 1970s, before it began televising them on a regular basis on January 18, 1987, with a game between the LSU Tigers and Kentucky Wildcats). As CBS and NBC were also broadcasting college games at the time, this put the sport on all three major broadcast television networks.

After the ABC Sports division was merged into ESPN Inc. by parent company Disney in 2006, broadcasts have since been produced by ESPN and have primarily used the ESPN College Basketball branding and graphics instead of the College Basketball on ABC branding.

After a five-year hiatus, ABC returned to airing college basketball in 2019 with five games on the network, and has continued to do so since.

== Overview ==
=== 1960s ===
ABC first broadcast college basketball games in 1962, when the network aired the NCAA Championship Game on a day-behind delayed basis, as part of its Wide World of Sports anthology series. On December 15, 1973, ABC aired what is considered to be the first telecast of a regular season college basketball game by a major broadcast network. A feature of the afternoon episode of the program, ABC's Wide World of Sports, the game was a special presentation rather than the start of regular telecasts., and matched UCLA and North Carolina State in St. Louis). Previously, postseason games in the NCAA tournament had been shown on NBC. Regular season college basketball games, though not on ABC, NBC or CBS, had been syndicated to U.S. television stations, such as the so-called ""Game of the Century"" sold to stations nationwide by the TVS Television Network in 1968. ABC (which had recently lost the NBA rights to CBS) televised this game using its former NBA announcing crew of Keith Jackson and Bill Russell.

=== 1970s ===
In the 1977–78 season, C.D. Chesley (who controlled the rights to the Atlantic Coast Conference (ACC) at the time) wanted NBC to televise select ACC games as part of its national package as it had done the previous few years. However, NBC wanted to feature intersectional games. This action greatly upset Chesley, who wound up selling the rights to the ACC Tournament final to ABC. ABC would televise the 1978 ACC Tournament final as part of Wide World of Sports. The game, called by Keith Jackson and Bill Russell, marked the first time Duke University's Blue Devils basketball team played on national television.

=== 1980s ===
When ABC's coverage began in 1987, the network primarily covered the Big Ten, Big 8 and Pac-10 Conferences.

In the 1987–88 season, ABC did not air any college basketball games during the last three weekends of February due to the network's coverage of the Winter Olympics.

=== 1990s ===
Coverage by ABC steadily increased during the early 1990s; by the 1991–92 season, ABC was carrying regional games in many timeslots on Saturday and Sunday afternoons.

By 1991 (around the time NBC was phasing out their own college basketball coverage), ABC ramped up its basketball coverage in an effort to fill the void. As a result, the network also started to cover games focusing on teams from the Atlantic Coast Conference (ACC) and Southeastern Conference (SEC). Otherwise, it was essentially, a considerable hodge-podge with an ACC game one week, or a Pac-10 or Big 10 game the next. The games that were broadcast were a hodge-podge of conference matchups even after the ESPN on ABC brand change, with SEC and Big East match-ups occasionally being shown alongside frequent ACC, Big 12 and Pac-10 match-ups.

ABC's early regular season broadcasts were, for the most part, technically time buys from organizations such as Raycom (particularly, around 1990–91) or sister network ESPN. This in return, was a way to avoid union contracts which require that 100% of network shows had to use crew staff who were network union members. During the early 1990s, Raycom paid ABC US$1.8 million for six weeks of network airtime of 26 regional games. The format allowed Raycom to control the games and sell the advertising.

By 1997, ABC's presenting sponsor was Paine Webber.

Starting in 1997, coverage of the PGA Tour limited the number of games that the network showed; this continued through 2006.

=== 2000s ===
Coverage of the NBA further decreased college basketball coverage on the network when ABC Sports acquired the broadcast rights to the league (through a production arrangement with ESPN) beginning in 2002. Beginning with the 2007 season, all games were rebranded as part of the integration of ABC Sports into ESPN as ESPN on ABC (meaning that all sports telecasts on ABC would exclusively feature ESPN's graphics, music and announcers) and Sunday games were discontinued. From 2007 to 2009, all games began at 3:30 p.m. Eastern Time, which was a departure from the differing broadcast times that were previously assigned to the game telecasts.

=== 2010s ===
From 2010 to 2013, ABC broadcast the semi-finals and finals of the SEC men's basketball tournament. In 2014, ABC only broadcast the semi-final round of the tournament.

For the first time since 2009, ABC returned to airing regular season college basketball games in 2019. The network would air 5 games, starting on December 8, when the Texas Longhorns hosted the Texas A&M Aggies, and has slowly increased since then.

=== 2020s ===
Beginning with the 2021 NCAA Division I women's basketball tournament, select women's college basketball games have also aired on ABC. In December 2021, the first regular season women's college basketball game aired on ABC. Beginning with the 2022 NCAA Division I women's basketball tournament, ABC also airs the final of the tournament, along with select weekend tournament games.

Beginning in 2022, the number of college basketball games on ABC was reduced due to ABC's coverage of the XFL and later the United Football League, as well as the return of the National Hockey League.

On December 10, 2020, ESPN announced that it had acquired the top-tier rights to the SEC under a 10-year, $3 billion contract beginning in the 2024–25 season; similar to the conference's football rights, ABC will hold exclusive over-the-air rights to the SEC, replacing CBS. However, the SEC men's basketball tournament championship will remain on ESPN. The first SEC game to air on ABC under this new agreement was a women's college basketball doubleheader on Sunday, February 16, 2025. The first men's game was on Saturday, March 1, 2025.

On March 1, 2025, ESPN suffered a malfunction with its broadcast truck during the Auburn Tigers/Kentucky Wildcats NCAA Division I men's basketball game televised on ABC with 12:26 left in the 2nd half. According to a statement by ESPN, a generator that was connected to the truck at Rupp Arena caught on fire, causing them to lose power and knock the game off the air. The game was then moved to ESPNews due to the Pittsburgh Penguins/Boston Bruins National Hockey League game that was also scheduled for broadcast on ABC (Had the technical issues not occurred, the first few minutes of the Penguins/Bruins game would've likely aired on ESPNews and would be moved to ABC once the Auburn/Kentucky game concluded). Many fans and viewers alike were angry and took to social media to express their displeasure with ESPN over the way they handled the technical problem.

For the 2025–26 season, ABC announced an expanded schedule of college basketball games. ABC aired 11 games, all but one of which was in February 2026. For the first time, a women's college basketball game between South Carolina and LSU aired in primetime on February 14, 2026.

The schedule further expanded for the 2026–27 season to 13 men's and women's regular season games. For the first time, ABC will air a matchup between North Carolina and Duke on Saturday, February 13, 2027.

== Commentators ==
Currently, Dan Shulman, Jay Bilas, and Jess Sims are the primary announcing team for men's college basketball, while Ryan Ruocco, Rebecca Lobo, and Holly Rowe are the primary announcing team for women's college basketball.

In the early years of ABC's regular college basketball coverage, Keith Jackson and Dick Vitale were the primary announcing crew, while Gary Bender was the secondary play-by-play announcer behind Jackson. Meanwhile, Al Michaels did regional games during this period.

When Brent Musburger came over from CBS in late 1990, he started working with Dick Vitale on the main team. Jim Valvano did color commentary on games for ABC for a few years until his death in 1993; Vitale and Valvano were paired as co-analysts on ABC's college basketball broadcasts a few times during the 1991–92 season. In the 1992–93 season, Terry Gannon filled in on a few games for Valvano, who at the time was battling cancer, which would ultimately claim his life in April 1993.

Steve Lavin replaced Dick Vitale as the lead analyst beginning in 2005, as Vitale moved to ESPN's weekly primetime showcase game. From 2010 until 2014, when ABC only aired the SEC men's basketball tournament, Brad Nessler and Jimmy Dykes served as the broadcast team. When college basketball returned to ABC during the 2019–2020 season, a variety of ESPN College Basketball analysts were used, including Dick Vitale.

=== Play-by-play ===
- Dave Armstrong (1993)
- Dave Barnett (1992, 2001)
- Gary Bender (1987–1992)
- Jason Benetti (2019)
- Tim Brant (1994, 1998)
- Tim Brando (1993)
- Jim Brinson (1992–1997)
- Bob Carpenter (1995, 2000–2004)
- Bill Doleman (1999)
- Ron Franklin (2000–2007)
- Terry Gannon (2000–2009)
- Mike Goldberg (1999)
- Rich Hollenberg (2020)
- Keith Jackson (1987–1991)
- Mark Jones (1992–2006)
- Wayne Larrivee (1995)
- Chris Marlowe (1995, 2003)
- Al Michaels (1987–1989)
- Brent Musburger (1990–2009)
- Brad Nessler (2000–2002, 2005, 2007–2014)
- Dave O'Brien (2003–2004, 2007)
- Dave Pasch (2005–2006, 2019)
- Mike Patrick (2009)
- Steve Physioc (1996)
- Robin Roberts (1996)
- Jon Sciambi (2019)
- Dan Shulman (2002–2006)
- Dave Strader (2000–2002)
- Jim Szoke (1999)
- Gary Thorne (2005)
- Mike Tirico (2000–2001)
- Barry Tompkins (1992–1993)
- Al Trautwig (1987–1989)
- Roger Twibell (1989–1999)
- Fred White (1992–1993)
- Bob Wischusen (2008)

=== Color commentary ===
- Stephen Bardo (2007)
- Dan Belluomini (1992, 1997–1999)
- Jay Bilas (2000–2003, 2019)
- Quinn Buckner (2000–2002)
- Larry Conley (2000–2003)
- Brad Daugherty (2001–2004)
- Jimmy Dykes (1998–2014)
- Len Elmore (2000–2005, 2009)
- Larry Farmer (1994–1997)
- Fran Fraschilla (2003–2008, 2020)
- Terry Gannon (1993–1999)
- Doug Gottlieb (2005)
- Joe B. Hall (1987–1990)
- Steve Lavin (2004–2009)
- Tim McCormick (2004)
- John Mengelt (1993–1999)
- Ann Meyers (2002–2005)
- Cheryl Miller (1989–1993)
- Bob Ortegel (1992)
- David Robinson (1988)
- Digger Phelps (1987, 2019)
- Chris Piper (1995)
- Paul Splittorff (1993)
- Jon Sundvold (2000–2004)
- Gary Thompson (1992)
- Bob Valvano (2005)
- Jim Valvano (1990–1993)
- Dick Vitale (1987–2005, 2019)
- Bill Walton (2019)
- Bob Wenzel (2008)

=== Studio hosts ===
- Karl Ravech
- John Saunders
- Terry Gannon
- Bonnie Bernstein

=== Studio analysts ===
- Tom Brennan
- Doug Gottlieb

=== Reporters ===
- Thea Andrews
- Jack Arute

== See also ==
- ESPN on ABC
- Men's college basketball on television
- ESPN College Basketball
- List of ESPN College Basketball personalities

Preceded by None	NCAA Men's Division I Basketball Championship television broadcaster 1962	Succeeded by SNI
Preceded by ESPN	NCAA Division I women's basketball tournament television broadcaster 2022–present	Succeeded by Incumbent
