= College Basketball on NBC Sports =

- NBC's current college basketball logo during Big Ten Conference games.
- Genre: College basketball telecasts
- Presented by: See List of College Basketball on NBC personalities
- Theme music composer: Roger Tallman; Alex Hitchens
- Country of origin: United States
- Original language: English

Production
- Camera setup: Multi-camera
- Running time: 120 minutes or until end of game
- Production companies: NBC Sports; TVS Television Network

Original release
- Network: NBC (1969–1998 and 2024–present); NBCSN (2007–2021 and 2025–present); USA Network (2022–2025); Peacock (2020–present)
- Release: March 8, 1969 – February 28, 1998
- Release: January 1, 2012 – present

Related
- College Basketball on USA

College Basketball on NBC Sports is the de facto branding used for broadcasts of NCAA Division I men's college basketball games produced by NBC Sports, the sports division of the NBC television network in the United States. The NBC network broadcast college basketball games in some shape or form between 1969 and 1998. From 1969 to 1981, NBC covered the NCAA Division I men's basketball tournament. It became the first major network to broadcast the championship game, at a cost of more than US$500,000 in 1969.

In 2011, Comcast's sports channel Versus became part of NBC Sports after the company's acquisition of NBC Universal, and was relaunched as NBC Sports Network (NBCSN) in 2012. During the 2010s, NBCSN primarily carried coverage of basketball from the Atlantic 10 Conference, Colonial Athletic Association (CAA), and Ivy League.

NBCSN would lose the CAA and Ivy League, but retained its A-10 package. It was renewed in 2021 under a multi-year deal, and moved to USA Network in January 2022 after the shutdown of NBCSN. In August 2022, NBC Sports announced that it had acquired rights to Big Ten basketball as part of a larger agreement with the conference, with a package of games airing on Peacock beginning in the 2023–24 season.

On November 12, 2022, college basketball returned to the main NBC network when the Notre Dame women's college basketball team took on the California women's college basketball team as part of the inaugural Citi Shamrock Classic. It was the first women's college basketball game to ever air on NBC, and the first college basketball game of any kind since 1998. Men's college basketball returned to the main NBC network during the 2024–25 season.

== History ==
=== Early history ===
NBC's relationship with college basketball dates as far back as February 28, 1940, when W2XBS (the future flagship station for NBC, WNBC) presented a doubleheader at New York City's Madison Square Garden. The University of Pittsburgh faced off against Fordham University, followed by Georgetown University against New York University.

For NBC's first year of NCAA tournament coverage in 1969, the network aired the consolation game nationally, the national semi-finals on a regional basis (which were held on a Thursday night) and the championship game.

=== 1970s: NCAA Tournament coverage ===
The 1972 marked the final year that NBC aired the consolation game. The following year marked the first time that the Final Four was held on a Saturday, and was the first prime time championship game to air on NBC.

From 1969 to 1972, Final Four contests were split national telecasts. Because the NCAA Tournament wasn't seeded, but based on geography, the Final Four generally had two eastern and two western teams. NBC, with a prime-time slot, televised the eastern-oriented game in the east, and the western-oriented game in the west. It essentially was a split-national telecast, with the split occurring over the time, not simultaneous games. This inevitably created problems, such as when Louisville played UCLA in the late game in 1972, people in the east didn't see it. And, if the first game went into overtime, NBC couldn't close out the eastern window and open the western window. The western United States would get the end of the early game, but the east would still not get to see the late game. The secondary problem was that the east didn't get to see UCLA in the tournament until the title game.

By 1974, NBC was providing coverage of nine games in seven windows (a far cry from the current tournament coverage). The following year, NBC aired ten games in nine windows – presenting the regional finals as a tripleheader with regional coverage in the middle time slot; this was also the first year that Billy Packer covered the Final Four.

NBC did not start airing regular season games until about 1975–76, when the network partnered with the ad-hoc sports service TVS Television Network. While NBC Sports' on-air talent was used, the production was covered by TVS. By this point, NBC would air regional and national games on Saturdays, and national games (called by Dick Enberg, Al McGuire and Billy Packer) on Sundays. As for the regional telecasts on Saturdays, typically in the Northeast, before the game featuring the Big East or Atlantic 10 conferences, it was the "ECAC Game of the Week".

For the 1976–77 season, NBC moved the national games to Sundays. NBC added a Saturday game on the last weekend of the season to show undefeated San Francisco take on Notre Dame.

NBC added first round Sunday coverage during the 1977 tournament.

In the 1977–78 season, C.D. Chesley (who controlled the Atlantic Coast Conference (ACC) rights at the time) wanted NBC to televise select ACC games as part of its national package as it had the previous few years. However, NBC wanted to feature intersectional games. This action greatly upset Chesley, who wound up selling the rights to the ACC Tournament final to ABC. As a result, there was a notable absence of ACC home games in NBC's college basketball schedule for the 1977–78 season. For this season, NBC added Al McGuire to the No. 1 team alongside Dick Enberg and Billy Packer. Early in the season, NBC stationed McGuire in a remote location and went to him only for periodic commentary. Eventually, NBC moved McGuire courtside to form a three-man announcer team. Dick Stockton filled in for Enberg on at least three games.

In 1978, NBC aired all regional finals games nationally for the first time, moving two of the games to Sunday. NBC split up the analysts from its No. 1 announcer team for the first two weekends of the tournament. Al McGuire for the most part, worked with Curt Gowdy while Billy Packer generally worked with Dick Enberg. While Dick Enberg served as the play-by-play announcer for NBC's Final Four coverage in 1978, Curt Gowdy moved over to a hosting role for the Final Four coverage.

NBC's coverage of the 1979 NCAA championship game between Indiana State and Michigan State to this day, remains the highest-rated game (garnering a 24.1 rating) in the history of televised college basketball.

=== 1980s: Loss of NCAA Tournament, continued regular season coverage ===
On Super Bowl Sunday 1981, NBC broadcast the Ohio State-Virginia game (with Don Criqui doing play-by-play) at 1:30 pm. ET. In NBC's final year covering the NCAA tournament, 1981, the network introduced a policy of switching from game to game on the fly. Before this, NBC would naturally, stay with the regionally-televised games to their conclusion.

After NBC lost the tournament rights to CBS (which started a separate regular season package) beginning in 1982, they continued with TVS through 1983, wrapping up with the ACC Tournament Final (which NBC had traditionally wrapped up their coverage with, by this point).

After TVS went back to broadcasting separate, regional games beginning in 1983–84, NBC was left to pick up the games that CBS did not want (save for the ACC Final) for the rest of the 1980s.

During this period, NBC's promotional slogan for its game broadcasts was "College basketball, it's the stuff Saturdays are made of!" Another slogan that NBC used in game promotions was "Sunday come on home to college basketball on NBC!"

On January 27, 1985, Jim Valvano (who was still the NC State coach) called a game between Indiana and Illinois alongside Bob Costas for NBC after coaching a game the previous day.

=== 1990s: Decline ===
With CBS and ESPN gaining strength in the 1990s, all NBC could put together was a 4–5 game package featuring a then-mediocre Notre Dame program. By the 1992–93 season, NBC only broadcast two games, both involving Notre Dame (a February 6 contest against Duke, and a February 13 contest against Kentucky). NBC was seeing much more success with its broadcasts of Notre Dame football games than the team's basketball telecasts by this point.

On February 22, 1992, Al McGuire called his last game for NBC (UCLA @ Notre Dame). CBS signed McGuire for the NCAA tournament. In the 1993–94 season, NBC only aired one game, which was UCLA @ Notre Dame on February 5.

In the meantime, NBC also aired the Wooden Classic from 1994 to 1996.

For the 1995 edition of the Wooden Classic, ABC regionally televised the first half of the doubleheader (Villanova vs. Purdue) with Roger Twibell and Dick Vitale on the call. At approximately 3:45 pm. Eastern time, NBC broadcast Maryland vs. UCLA for the second half. On December 7, 1996, the first game of the Wooden Classic doubleheader (Utah vs. Arizona) tipped off at 1:45 pm, but NBC joined the action in progress at 2 p.m. for most of the country.

NBC's final men's college basketball during this period was a February 28, 1998 contest between Notre Dame and the Providence Friars. NBC continues to maintain a broadcasting relationship with the university as it airs all Notre Dame football home games and select away games.

=== 2010s: Coverage returns on cable ===
When Comcast and NBC Universal merged in 2011, college basketball on Versus was integrated into NBC Sports with the channel's relaunch as NBC Sports Network (NBCSN) on January 1, 2012. In 2012, NBC Sports reached agreements to carry Colonial Athletic Association (CAA) basketball and football on NBCSN and Comcast SportsNet, Atlantic 10 Conference (A-10) basketball on NBCSN, and renewed NBCSN's rights to the Ivy League for two additional seasons. By the late-2010s, NBC Sports had lost the CAA and Ivy League to other broadcasters.

=== 2020s: Expansion of coverage over-the-air and streaming ===
In 2021, NBCSN continued its relationship with the A-10 under a multi-year deal. 25 regular season games are broadcast per-season, as well as selected games from the Atlantic 10 men's basketball tournament. NBCSN shut down at the end of 2021, after which USA Network assumed its A-10 broadcasts (among other sports properties).

In August 2022, NBC Sports announced that it had reached a seven-year deal to carry Big Ten Conference athletics on its platforms, which will include a package of Big Ten men's and women's basketball games on Peacock beginning in the 2023–24 season. Peacock will air up to 47 men's basketball games and 30 women's basketball games per-season (including 32 and 20 intraconference games respectively), as well as the opening night doubleheaders of the men's and women's conference tournaments.

NBC Sports carried two inaugural showcase games during the 2022–23 season; NBC aired the Citi Shamrock Classic on November 12, 2022, between Notre Dame and California's women's basketball teams. It marked the first women's college basketball game to ever air on NBC, and its first college basketball game overall since 1998. Peacock would sponsor and air the Peacock Classic on December 2, 2022, between Baylor and Gonzaga—a rematch of the 2021 national championship game.

For the 2023–24 season, it was announced that Noah Eagle, Jac Collinsworth, and Terry Gannon would be the primary play-by-play broadcasters for Big Ten men's basketball, while Robbie Hummel and Stephen Bardo will be the primary game analysts. Additionally, Paul Burmeister, Steve Burkowski, Rich Lerner, and Steve Schlanger would provide play-by-play on select games, while Tre Demps would be an additional game analyst. For Big Ten women's basketball, Zora Stephenson, Cindy Brunson, and Sloane Martin were announced as play-by-play broadcasters, with Meghan McKeown and Julianne Viani serving as game analysts. Ahmed Fareed was announced as studio host for Big Ten men's coverage, working with studio analysts Josh Pastner, and Jordan Cornette, while Carolyn Manno was announced as the studio host for Big Ten women's coverage, with studio analysts Aliyah Boston and Meghan McKeown. Along with Big Ten basketball, Peacock also announced they would air the Indy Classic and the final day of the Philadelphia Big 5, the latter of which was also simulcast on NBC Sports Philadelphia Plus.

On December 14, 2023, NBC Sports announced an extension to its Atlantic 10 agreement. NBC Sports will continue to air 25 men's regular season games and 3 women's regular season games, mostly on USA Network. USA Network will also air the first, second and quarterfinals of the Atlantic 10 men's basketball tournament and the quarterfinals of the Atlantic 10 women's basketball tournament. Games that previously streamed for free on the NBC Sports App would now air on Peacock.

On June 27, 2024, the Big East announced new media rights agreements with NBC, Fox, and TNT Sports; in the 2024–25 season, Peacock would air 30 games, including five tournament games in the early round and quarterfinal stages, and two would air on NBC. The coverage will expand to 60 men's and women's games beginning in the 2025–26 season. NBC also aired three women's and two men's Big Ten games in the 2024–25 season, an increase from the previous season. For the first time, the NBC Sports FAST channel (later NBC Sports NOW) aired games including the inaugural Women's Basketball Coaches Association Showcase, one game from the NABC Hall of Fame Classic, and the men's and women's HBCU All-Star Game.

NBC Sports underwent significant changes to its coverage for the 2025–26 season. Prior to the season, NBC Sports announced an agreement with the Big 12 Conference to exclusively broadcast 20 men's basketball games. In addition to coverage of the Big 12, Big Ten and Big East, in 2025–26, NBC Sports also aired the NABC Hall of Fame Classic, Basketball Hall of Fame Tip-Off, and the Shamrock Classic. Beginning on November 18, 2025, select college basketball games originally scheduled for Peacock also began airing on NBCSN. Finally, due to the spin off of USA Network into Versant, Atlantic 10 basketball coverage is no longer being produced by NBC Sports and will no longer air on Peacock. Instead, games will be produced by USA Sports under the College Basketball on USA brand.

== Coverage overview ==
=== Current ===
- Citi Shamrock Classic on NBC (2022–2023, 2025–present)
- Big Ten Conference on NBC, Peacock and NBCSN (2023–present)
- Big East Conference on NBC, Peacock and NBCSN (2024–present)
- NABC Hall of Fame Classic on NBC Sports NOW and Peacock (2024–present)
- HBCU All-Star Game on NBC Sports NOW and Peacock (2024–present)
- Big 12 Conference on Peacock and NBCSN (2025–present)
- Basketball Hall of Fame Tip-Off (2025–present)

=== Former ===
- NCAA Division I men's basketball tournament on NBC (1969–1981)
- Regular season coverage via TVS Television Network on NBC (1975–1983)
- Western Athletic Conference men's basketball tournament championship on NBC (1984)
- Southwest Conference men's basketball tournament championship on NBC (1984)
- Southeastern Conference men's basketball tournament championship on NBC (1984–1986)
- Regular season coverage via various conferences on NBC (1984–1998)
- Atlantic Coast Conference men's basketball tournament championship on NBC (1984–1990)
- Southeastern Conference men's basketball tournament semifinal on NBC (1987)
- Wooden Classic on NBC (1994–1996)
- Battle 4 Atlantis on NBCSN (2012–2013)
- Mountain West Conference on NBCSN (2012–2013)
- Ivy League on NBCSN (2012–2014)
- Colonial Athletic Association on NBCSN and CSN/NBC Sports Regional Networks (2012–2016)
- Atlantic 10 on USA Network, Peacock, NBCSN and CSN/NBC Sports Regional Network (2012–2025)
- Barclays Center Classic on NBCSN (2013–2014)
- Peacock Classic on Peacock (2022)
- Indy Classic on Peacock (2023)
- Philadelphia Big 5 on Peacock and NBC Sports Philadelphia Plus (2023)
- Women's Basketball Coaches Association Showcase on NBC Sports NOW and Peacock (2024)

== Announcers ==
=== Play-by-play ===
- Noah Eagle
- Paul Burmeister
- Jac Collinsworth
- Terry Gannon
- Jason Knapp
- Rich Lerner
- John Fanta
- Michael Grady
- Justin Kutcher
- Cindy Brunson
- Steve Schlanger
- Zora Stephenson
- Sloane Martin
- Mike Corey
- Steve Burkowski
- Ted Robinson
- Noah Reed
- Ann Schatz
- Geoff Arnold

=== Color commentary ===
- Corey Robinson
- Tim McCormick
- Robbie Hummel
- Stephen Bardo
- Matt McCall
- Julianne Viani
- Meghan McKeown
- John Giannini
- Tre Demps
- LaChina Robinson
- Donny Marshall
- Nik Stauskas
- Darren Collison
- Kim Adams
- Aja Ellison
- Tom Crean
- Isis Young
- Austin Rivers
- Tykera Carter
- Dominique Patrick
- Nikki Cardano-Hillary

=== Sideline reporters ===
- Caroline Pineda
- Brittany Eurton
- Kira K. Dixon
- Katie Storm

=== Studio hosts ===
- Ahmed Fareed
- Jac Collinsworth
- Carolyn Manno
- Lindsay Czarniak

=== Studio analysts ===
- Jordan Cornette
- Matt McCall
- Calbert Cheaney
- Evan Turner
- Meghan McKeown-Wallace
- Aliyah Boston
- Nicole Auerbach
- Lisa Bluder

=== Former commentator pairings ===
As previously mentioned, NBC and TVS were partners in televising college basketball from 1975 to 1983. Typically on Saturdays, NBC and TVS would broadcast a regional slate of college basketball from the various conferences.

Conference	Play-by-play	Color commentator(s)
Big East/ECAC	Marv Albert/Andy Musser	Bucky Waters
Big 10	Merle Harmon/Bob Costas	Jerry Lucas/Fred Taylor/Steve Grote
Big 8	Fred White/Jay Randolph/Merle Harmon	Gary Thompson/Glen Potter
SEC	John Ferguson/Tom Hammond	Joe Dean
Pac-10	Ross Porter/Barry Tompkins	Lynn Shackelford
SWC	Frank Fallon/Frank Glieber	Rudy Davalos/Dan Spika

== See also ==
- Men's college basketball on television
- NCAA Division I men's basketball tournament#Television coverage and revenues
- College Football on NBC Sports
- College Basketball on USA

Preceded by SNI	NCAA Men's Division I Basketball Championship television broadcaster 1969 – 1981	Succeeded by CBS
