= Billy Packer =

American sportscaster (1940–2023)

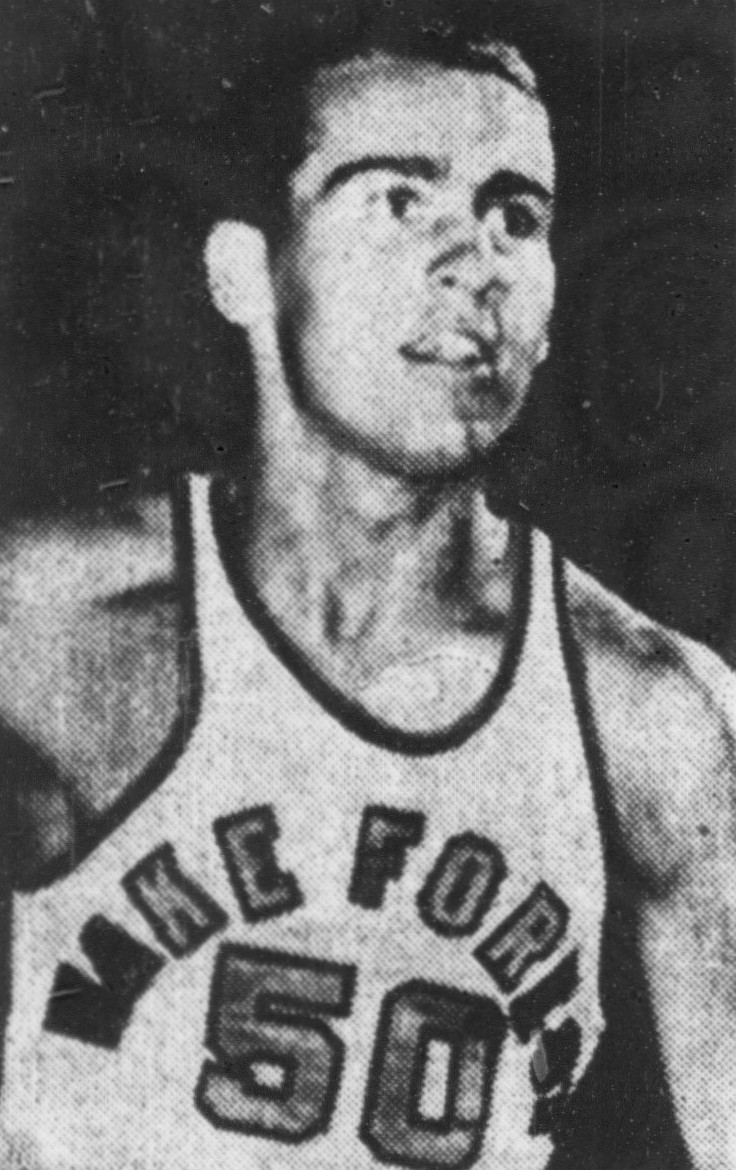
- Packer, circa 1960
- Born: Anthony William Paczkowski; February 25, 1940; Wellsville, New York, U.S.
- Died: January 26, 2023 (aged 82); Charlotte, North Carolina, U.S.
- Education: Wake Forest University
- Occupation: Sports commentator
- Years active: 1972–2008
- Spouse: Barbara Ann Sucansky (m. 1961; died 2022)
- Children: 3
- Sports commentary career
- Genre: Play-by-play
- Sport: NCAA March Madness
- Employer: NBC Sports (1974–1981); CBS Sports (1981–2008)

Anthony William Packer (né Paczkowski; February 25, 1940 – January 26, 2023) was an American college basketball player, sportscaster, and author. Packer spent more than three decades working as a color analyst for television coverage of college basketball.

== Early life and education ==
Packer was born Anthony William Paczkowski in Wellsville, New York. His parents subsequently changed their Polish surname from Paczkowski to Packer. His father Tony was an outstanding athlete in football, basketball, and baseball at St. Lawrence University and was inducted into the university's Hall of Fame in 1982. Tony's 35 years of service at Lehigh University included 16 seasons as the school's men's basketball head coach from 1950 to 1966.

Packer was a graduate of Liberty High School in Bethlehem, Pennsylvania. He attended Wake Forest University in Winston-Salem, North Carolina from 1958 to 1962 and played guard on the school's basketball team for his last three years of college (at the time, freshmen were not eligible for varsity sports). He led Wake Forest to two Atlantic Coast Conference titles and the 1962 Final Four. He was a member of the Delta Nu chapter of Sigma Chi fraternity.

After graduation, he had a brief stint as an assistant coach for his alma mater. In 1972, Packer began his career in broadcasting in Raleigh, North Carolina, when he was asked to fill in as color analyst for a regionally televised ACC game. He became a regular the next season.

== Broadcasting career ==
Packer first worked at the network level with NBC (1974–1981) and then CBS (1981–2008). He covered every NCAA Men's Division I Basketball Championship, including the Final Four from 1975 to 2008. For many years he also covered ACC games for Raycom Sports. In 1986 he helped create the computer game Hoops. He won a Sports Emmy Award in 1993.

In 2005, Packer received the Marvin Francis Award for "notable achievement and service in coverage of the ACC," as reported by The Washington Post.

On July 15, 2008, CBS announced that Packer would be replaced by Clark Kellogg on the network's lead broadcast crew. This marked the end of 35 straight years of Packer covering the NCAA tournament as a TV analyst.

In March 2009, he returned to the studio with Bob Knight for Survive and Advance, an NCAA tournament preview show produced by Fox Sports Net. Packer also served as a color commentator for Putt-Putt Professional Putters Association television broadcasts. He called the historic 1982 PPA National Championship, which featured 4 future Hall of Fame players among the 8 contestants.

=== Broadcasting partners ===
Packer's broadcast teammates included Curt Gowdy, Jim Thacker, Dick Enberg, Al McGuire, Gary Bender, and Brent Musburger. From 1991 to 2008 he worked alongside Jim Nantz and Verne Lundquist (usually during pre-Championship Week while Nantz was covering the NFL and/or golf). When working games for Raycom Sports, Packer's on-air partner was Tim Brant. When Nantz was a broadcaster for the 1992 Winter Olympics for CBS, Packer's on-air partner was Mel Proctor. Packer also did play-by-play alongside McGuire for two games (a February 6, 1994, contest with Purdue at Iowa and a February 27, 1994, Indiana at Minnesota game while Jim Nantz was broadcasting the 1994 Winter Olympics for CBS).

=== Memorable calls ===
He was part of the March 26, 1979 broadcast with Dick Enberg and Al McGuire for the NCAA championship game between Michigan State and Indiana State. The game, which featured Magic Johnson and Larry Bird, saw an estimated 35.1 million view the game, which is the largest television audience for an NCAA game as of 2022.

On April 4, 1983, after Lorenzo Charles made a game-winning slam dunk as North Carolina State upset Houston to win the NCAA title, Packer said, "They won it... on the dunk!"

In the 1991 national semi-final game with Duke losing by 5 to undefeated UNLV with just over 2 minutes left, Packer said, "Duke doesn't need a 3 pointer here" just as Bobby Hurley shot and made one of the biggest baskets in Duke basketball history.

After the University of Arizona won the 1997 national title, Arizona star player Miles Simon celebrated on the court. Observing the scene Packer said, "Simon says... championship."

=== Career timeline ===
- 1972–2008: C.D. Chesley/MetroSports/Raycom/Jefferson-Pilot Sports ACC Basketball Analyst
- 1974–1981: NBC Sports Lead College Basketball Analyst
- 1981–2008: CBS Sports Lead College Basketball Analyst

== Controversy ==
=== Announcing style ===
Packer was described as a broadcaster as "overbearing, arrogant, condescending, dismissive and petulant". Sports-radio talk-show host Mike Francesa would say Packer would broadcast games with a red marker. A red marker is often used by teachers to correct errors by students. Packer was criticized for always telling fans what went wrong instead of complimenting players and strong play. If a team scored, it was always the fault of poor defense. If a team didn't score, he would often criticize a player for failing to execute a play properly or taking an ill-advised shot. Players and games were always expected to be better. He was also noted for constantly criticizing coaching strategies. This was a stark contrast to the enthusiasm of other noted college basketball broadcasters like Dick Vitale and Bill Raftery. Francesa said Packer's constant negativity could be off-putting to the audience watching at home. Others in the media, also started to feel that Packer had become too much of a curmudgeon and constantly harped on everything wrong in college basketball and society at large. Many other viewers appreciated Packer's insights about finer points of the game.

=== Legal cases and politics ===
Packer involved himself in high-profile legal cases, hiring a psychic to find the weapon in the O. J. Simpson murder case. When he was in Atlanta right after the bombing at the 1996 Olympic Games, he was curious about the scenario and did his own reenactment that led him to believe Richard Jewell (accused of the bombing) was innocent; he soon started a legal defense fund for Jewell. Packer purchased Picasso ceramics and displayed them in a makeshift plexiglass and plywood work desk he had created. Packer once directed his interest to politics by approaching 123 random women, without identifying himself, and asked them if they would vote for Hillary Clinton.

=== Iverson comment ===
In 1996, during an on-air broadcast of a game between Georgetown and Villanova, Packer described Hoyas star guard Allen Iverson as a "tough monkey." Packer later apologized, insisting he was actually trying to praise Iverson's relentless play. Neither Iverson nor Georgetown coach John Thompson said he was offended by the remark. Thompson told USA Today he did not "have to explain to anybody about Billy being a racist because he's not."

=== Apology to Duke students ===
In 2000, Packer publicly apologized to two Duke University students for allegedly sexist comments he made before a men's basketball game in Cameron Indoor Stadium. According to published reports when the students asked Packer to show his press pass, he responded, "Since when do we let women control who gets into a men's basketball game? Why don't you go find a women's game to let people into?" Packer apologized after his comments were published in Duke University's student-run newspaper, The Chronicle.

=== 2006 comments on mid-majors ===
In 2006, Packer again hit sports headlines after blasting the inclusion of mid-major teams in the NCAA tournament, when larger conference teams like Cincinnati and Florida State were left out altogether. His comments caused a backlash among fans of mid-major conferences such as the Missouri Valley Conference, which Packer had singled out for getting four teams in; and the Colonial Athletic Association, both of which ended up having successful tournament showings (Bradley and Wichita State making it to the Sweet Sixteen and George Mason advancing to the Final Four). Packer complained on Selection Sunday that teams from these two conferences had won just one game between them in the past three years' tournaments, despite committee chairman Craig Littlepage repeatedly telling Packer and his colleague Jim Nantz that past tournament performance was not a factor in determining the field. A week later, Packer tried to defuse the controversy by saying on CBS airwaves, that he was "often wrong, but never in doubt." (March 19, 2006)

=== Kansas-North Carolina Final Four game ===
In a semi-final game at the 2008 Final Four between Kansas and North Carolina, the Jayhawks jumped out to a 38–12 lead at which time Billy Packer declared, "This game is over." However, the Tar Heels clawed their way back in the second half, cutting the deficit to four points midway through the second half, although Kansas finished strong to win 84–66. Pundits commented that this may have been an ominous allusion to Packer's future career as a broadcaster, which was "over" when CBS announced over the summer of 2008 that Clark Kellogg would be taking over the lead color commentary duties.

== Author ==
Packer was the author of Hoops, Why We Win, and a number of other basketball books.

== Personal life ==
He was married to Barbara (née Sucansky), and they had three children. Two of his children (Brandt and Mark) work in sports media, Brandt works as a producer for Golf Channel and Mark is a sports radio host based in Charlotte, North Carolina. In 1988, Billy Packer was inducted into the National Polish American Sports Hall of Fame.

== Death ==
Packer died of kidney failure on January 26, 2023, in Charlotte, North Carolina, at the age of 82.

== See also ==
- List of All-Atlantic Coast Conference men's basketball teams

== Notes and references ==
Preceded by Curt Gowdy	Lead analyst, NCAA Men's Basketball Championship (with Al McGuire, 1978–1981); 1977–2008	Succeeded by Clark Kellogg
