= Clark Kellogg =

American basketball player (born 1961)

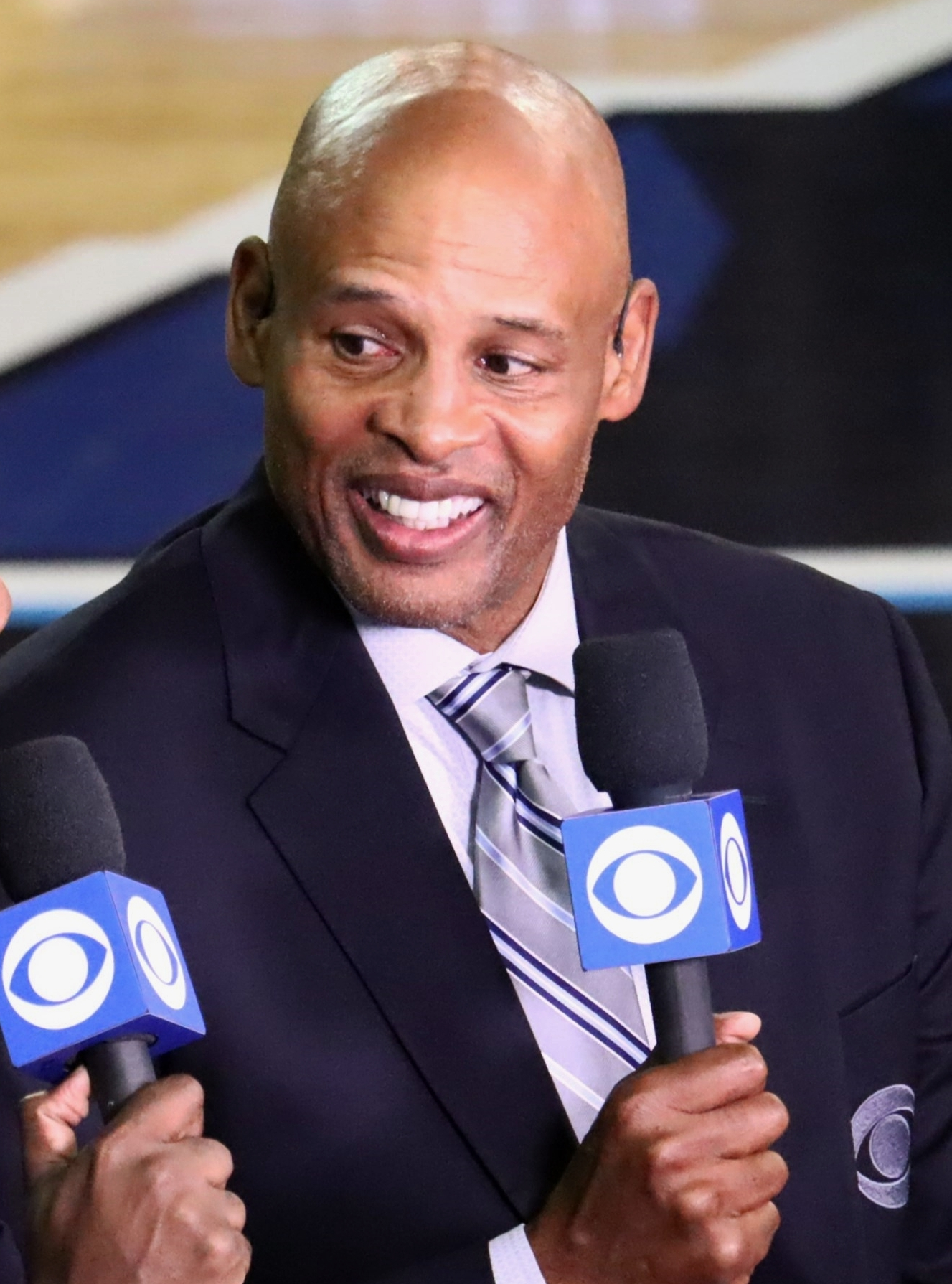
- Kellogg in 2023

Personal information
- Born: July 2, 1961 (age 65) Cleveland, Ohio, U.S.
- Listed height: 6 ft 7 in (2.01 m)
- Listed weight: 225 lb (102 kg)

Career information
- High school: St. Joseph (Cleveland, Ohio)
- College: Ohio State (1979–1982)
- NBA draft: 1982: 1st round, 8th overall pick
- Drafted by: Indiana Pacers
- Playing career: 1982–1987
- Position: Power forward
- Number: 33

Career history
- 1982–1987: Indiana Pacers

Career highlights
- NBA All-Rookie First Team (1983); First-team All-Big Ten (1982); Mr. Basketball USA (1979); First-team Parade All-American (1979); McDonald's All-American (1979)

Career NBA statistics
- Points: 4,918 (18.9 ppg)
- Rebounds: 2,482 (9.5 rpg)
- Assists: 764 (2.9 apg)
- Stats at NBA.com
- Stats at Basketball Reference

Clark Clifton Kellogg Jr. (born July 2, 1961) is an American former professional basketball player who is the lead college basketball analyst for CBS Sports. He played in the National Basketball Association (NBA) for the Indiana Pacers.

== Basketball career ==
=== High school ===
Clark "Special K" Kellogg grew up in East Cleveland, Ohio, attended Chambers Elementary, W.H. Kirk Middle School (both in East Cleveland), and St. Joseph High School in Cleveland, Ohio, and had a high school basketball career generally regarded as one of the finest in Cleveland history. The highlight was a 74–65 loss in the 1979 state championship game to Columbus East that saw Kellogg score 51 points and grab 24 rebounds. His 51-point game is still an Ohio high school state finals record. Kellogg also played in the McDonald's All-American and Capital Classic games.

=== College ===
From 1979 to 1982, Kellogg played for Ohio State University, where he earned All-Big Ten Conference and Most Valuable Player honors; in 1996, he received his marketing degree. In June 2010, Ohio Gov. Ted Strickland appointed Kellogg to the university's board of trustees, where he served until 2019.

=== NBA ===
In 1982, Kellogg declared for the NBA draft after his junior year of college and was a 1st-round draft pick (8th overall) of the Indiana Pacers. In his first season, he was selected as a member of the NBA All-Rookie Team. He is one of only a handful of rookies in NBA history to average 20 points and 10 rebounds a game, having averaged 20.1 points, 10.6 rebounds, and 2.6 assists per game. Kellogg came in second place in NBA Rookie of the Year voting, losing to Terry Cummings, who is also one of the only four players to average 20 points and 10 rebounds in a rookie season and not make the Basketball Hall of Fame. Following his rookie year success, Kellogg was much heralded as the next breakout NBA superstar. Converse signed him to an endorsement deal, to release his own Converse "Special K" sneaker. However, he only played three full seasons, and portions of two others for the Pacers before chronic knee problems forced him to retire. During his three full seasons with Indiana, they went a combined 68–178.

== Personal life ==
Kellogg married his wife Rosy, in 1983. They have two sons, Clark (Alex) and Nick, and a daughter, Talisa. Alex played basketball for Providence College and Ohio University. Nick played basketball for Ohio University and Talisa played Division I volleyball at Georgia Tech.

Kellogg became a Christian in 1985 after questioning his "purpose in life." Kellogg has spoken about his faith saying, "...my faith remains my foundation. Christ is my all and the driver of my life."

== Career statistics ==
Legend
GP	Games played	GS	Games started	MPG	Minutes per game
FG%	Field goal percentage	3P%	3-point field goal percentage	FT%	Free throw percentage
RPG	Rebounds per game	APG	Assists per game	SPG	Steals per game
BPG	Blocks per game	PPG	Points per game	**Bold**	Career high

=== NBA ===
==== Regular season ====
Year	Team	GP	GS	MPG	FG%	3P%	FT%	RPG	APG	SPG	BPG	PPG
1982–83	Indiana	**81**	**81**	**34.1**	.479	.222	.741	**10.6**	2.8	**1.7**	**0.5**	**20.1**
1983–84	Indiana	79	79	33.9	**.519**	.333	**.768**	9.1	3.0	1.5	0.4	19.1
1984–85	Indiana	77	65	31.8	.505	**.500**	.760	9.4	**3.2**	1.1	0.3	18.6
1985–86	Indiana	19	12	29.9	.473	.308	**.768**	8.8	3.0	1.5	0.4	17.6
1986–87	Indiana	4	4	15.0	.364	**.500**	.750	2.8	1.5	1.3	0.0	5.0
Career		260	241	32.7	.497	.338	.757	9.5	2.9	1.5	0.4	18.9

== Broadcasting career ==
=== ESPN ===
In 1989, he joined ESPN as a basketball analyst. He has also worked for the Big East Network and Prime Sports.

=== WTTV/FSN-Indiana ===
Kellogg served as a television analyst for Indiana Pacers road games.

=== CBS Sports ===
From 1993 to 1994, Kellogg served as a game analyst for the CBS Sports coverage of the NCAA tournament. From 1994 to 1997, he served as a studio co-host for the early round coverage of the NCAA Tournament. In 1997, Kellogg joined CBS Sports full-time as a studio/game analyst for college basketball coverage and was one of three in-studio hosts for March Madness along with Greg Gumbel and Sports Illustrated's Seth Davis. He would typically work as the #2 game analyst until around Championship Week when he would move into the studio for the remainder of the season. He is known for using the phrase "spurtability" as a reference to a team's ability to score points in quick succession.

Kellogg replaced Billy Packer as CBS' lead basketball game analyst beginning in the 2008–2009 college basketball season and called the 2009 NCAA men's basketball championship with Jim Nantz. He also worked games at the beginning of the season with Verne Lundquist when Nantz was on other CBS Sports duties including the NFL and golf.

In March 2010, Kellogg played a game of H.O.R.S.E. against U.S. President Barack Obama. The game, called "P.O.T.U.S." for the occasion, was won by Obama, who had P.O.T.U. to Kellogg's P.O.T.U.S.

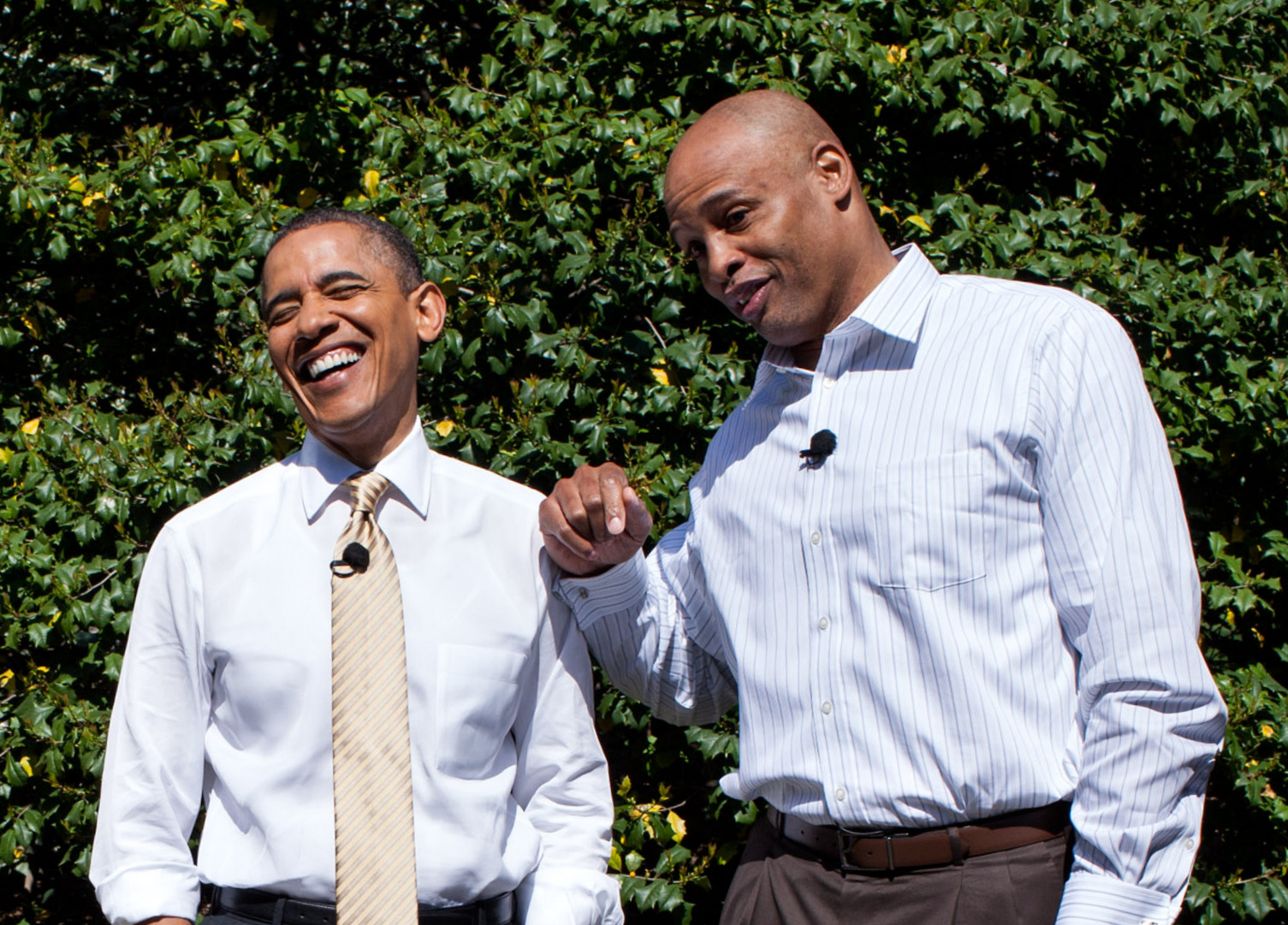
Kellogg with President Barack Obama in 2012.

During the 2012 NCAA men's tournament, the Ohio Bobcats, for whom Kellogg's son, Nick, played, advanced to the Sweet Sixteen round with a win over South Florida in Nashville. At the same time Kellogg was calling another tournament game, the Lehigh – Xavier game almost 500 miles (805 km) away in Greensboro, North Carolina. Kellogg, in a digression from his impartiality as a commentator, exclaimed "Way to go, Bobcats!" when the final score rolled on his monitor.

In 2014, Kellogg returned to his previous role as a studio analyst. In return, Greg Anthony (who himself had been a studio analyst since 2008) took over Kellogg's role as lead college basketball game analyst. In 2025, Kellogg was a recipient of the Curt Gowdy Electronic Media Award by the Naismith Memorial Basketball Hall of Fame along with basketball play-by-play broadcaster George Blaha of Fan Duel Sports Detroit.

=== NBA 2K announcer ===
Kellogg appeared in the popular NBA video game NBA 2K9 as the co-commentator alongside Kevin Harlan. The pair rejoined for future games in the series; they have appeared in every game since.

== See also ==
- Coach Wooden "Keys to Life" Award
