= ESPN College Basketball =

American live sports television series

- Genre: College basketball telecasts
- Country of origin: United States
- Original language: English

Production
- Camera setup: Multi-camera
- Running time: 120 minutes or until end of game

Original release
- Network: ESPN
- Release: 1979 – present

Related
- ESPN College GameDay; College Basketball on ABC

ESPN College Basketball is a blanket title used for presentations of college basketball on ESPN and its family of networks (including ABC since 2006). Its coverage focuses primarily on competition in NCAA Division I, holding broadcast rights to games from most major conferences, and a number of mid-major conferences.

ESPN was the first broadcaster to provide extensive early-round coverage of NCAA Men's Division I Basketball Championship, prior to CBS, later in partnership with Turner Sports, holding sole rights to "March Madness". ESPN also covers a number of early-season tournaments and conference championships, and is also the exclusive broadcaster of the NCAA Division I women's tournament and the National Invitation Tournament (NIT).

== History ==
=== 1979 ===
ESPN has aired college basketball games from its inception, starting in 1979 with DePaul's victory over Wisconsin with a then-novice color commentator Dick Vitale and Joe Boyle doing the play-by-play. In the early days, Vitale was paired with veteran sportscaster Jim Simpson.

=== 1980s ===
One of the first milestone events that ESPN covered was the NCAA tournament. In 1980, the fledgling channel had a total of 23 tournament games. More specifically, ESPN aired the NCAA Productions telecasts of all 16 first-round games (12 on tape delay). Jay Randolph, Gary Thompson, Steve Shannon, Steve Grad, Fred White, Larry Conley, Bill O'Donnell, Bucky Waters, and Jeff Mullins were among the commentators. ESPN again aired 16 first-round games (12 on tape delay) produced by NCAA Productions in 1981. That year, ESPN aired the BYU-Notre Dame (at Atlanta) with Bill O'Donnell and Jeff Mullins on the call. This particular game soon became famous for Danny Ainge's coast-to-coast buzzer beater to send BYU to Elite 8. ESPN also aired the last Final Four consolation game at 5 p.m. on March 30, 1981.

They intensively covered the early rounds of March Madness, gaining the entire tournament much prestige. The early rounds of course were not the most ideal time, many games taking place during work hours. When CBS gained exclusive coverage in 1991, they would largely mimic how their predecessor had covered the event. ESPN aired the NCAA productions telecasts of all 16 first-round games (12 on tape delay).

During the 1985 NCAA tournament, ESPN aired five live games on each first round day which, combined with the CBS games and the around the clock ESPN tape delayed games, made for almost non-stop basketball for 55 consecutive hours from Thursday noon through early Saturday evening. With four games at each first round site, NCAA Productions typically sent two announcer crews to each site to call two games each.

One of the next milestones in ESPN's coverage was when they aired Championship Week for the first time in 1986 (the term would be coined later however). The network was given critical acclaim for its coverage of the conference tournaments, of bouncing from game to the next. It also raised the profile of many "mid-major" and "minor" conferences who received their only national attention during a single game, usually the championship game of their conference tournament. Like everything else with ESPN, the success and expansion of the network led to more games being televised in this made-for-TV event.

1987 was the last year that ESPN was involved in the regional semifinals of the NCAA Tournament. John Saunders was ESPN's studio host in the afternoon while Bob Ley was the studio host in the evening. Dick Vitale served as the studio analyst for both men. In 1989, Tim Brando became the afternoon studio host while John Saunders moved to the evening. And then a year later, Chris Fowler replaced Brando as the afternoon studio host. As previously mentioned, 1990 was also the last year ESPN/NCAA Productions' involvement.

In the late 1980s and early 1990s with only a single network; no regional or internet coverage, ESPN televised around 200 games a year.

=== 1990s ===
In 1991, they would lose coverage of the early rounds of the NCAA Tournament but would continue to televise just as many regular season games and conference tournament games.

In 1993, ESPN aired the Women's Selection Show for the first time ever. Unlike the men's tournament, ESPN is the only network that airs the unveiling.

In 1996, ESPN and ESPN2 aired a total of 281 men's games and 22 women's games.

=== 2000s ===
ESPN has rapidly increased its coverage throughout the years as the network as expanded from a single cable channel to a multiple outlets including the internet.

In 2003, ESPN and its sister networks aired all the games of the Women's NCAA Tournament for the first time ever, a practice that still exists today.

On March 4, 2005, ESPNU premiered on the outset of a Texas–Oklahoma State game from Stillwater, Oklahoma with a special two-hour edition of College GameDay.

In 2007, ESPN Radio aired its first-ever coverage of the Selection Sunday.

The ESPN networks aired about 1,100 games during the 2008–09 season, including 148 women's games (including the entire NCAA Tournament).

In the 2009–10 season, ESPN began a 15-year deal to serve as the main rightsholder of the SEC. The package initially contained a broadcast television package via ESPN Regional Television (SEC Network, later SEC TV), which replaced the conference's long-standing association with Raycom Sports. ESPN later launched an SEC Network cable network.

=== 2010s ===
In 2010, ESPN reached a deal for rights to Atlantic Coast Conference (ACC) basketball and football, while still maintaining Raycom's long-standing syndicated package. In July 2016, ESPN announced an extension of the agreement, which would include the formation of the ACC Network cable channel, and the end of Raycom's broadcast television package after the 2018–19 season. In 2017, ESPN renewed its rights to the Big Ten through the 2022–23 season.

In 2017, ESPN unveiled a significantly redesigned on-air presentation for college basketball games; ESPN explained that the new branding was designed to reflect the fan culture and tribalism of the game.

=== 2020s ===
In August 2022, ESPN lost its rights to the Big Ten after the upcoming 2022–23 season. In October 2022, ESPN renewed with the Big 12 Conference.

In the 2023–24 season, ESPN aired five additional Wednesday-night games in January 2024, replacing NBA Wednesday games that had been relocated to ABC as replacement programming due to the WGA and SAG-AFTRA strikes.

Ahead of the 2026–27 season (where ESPN planned to broadcast over 4,000 games in total, with at least 750 on linear television), ESPN acquired rights to the Players Era Festival, and debuted a new on-air presentation for college basketball.

== Coverage ==
=== Game coverage ===
ESPN broadcasts weekly games in various windows. Its flagship weekly games are

- Big Monday: A Monday-night doubleheader on ESPN, aired after the conclusion of Monday Night Football for the season. From the 2013–14 season, it has consisted of an Atlantic Coast Conference (ACC) game, followed by a Big 12 Conference game. Prior to its realignment in the 2013–14 season, the Big East was featured as the early game alongside the Big 12 (hence the title). The second game was initially a Big Ten game; in the 1991–92 season, they were moved to an early window on Tuesdays in favor of the then-Big Eight Conference, citing that the conference's territorial footprint was more favorable for 9:30 p.m. ET starts than the Big Ten. Previously, Big Monday also featured a third, west coast game at 12:00 a.m. ET (9 p.m. PT), which in the past had featured games involving conferences such as the Big West (especially UNLV during its glory years under Jerry Tarkanian), Western Athletic Conference (WAC), and West Coast Conference (WCC).

- Super Tuesday, a Tuesday-night doubleheader on ESPN; before losing rights to the conference, it typically featured a Big Ten Conference game, followed by an SEC game.

- Wednesday Night Hoops

- Thursday Night Showcase

- Saturday Primetime

ESPN currently airs many pre-season tournaments and showcases, some of which are organized by ESPN Events, including the AdvoCare Invitational, the ACC–SEC Challenge (which replaced the ACC–Big Ten Challenge held from 1999 through 2022), the Champions Classic, the Jimmy V Classic, the NIT Season Tip-Off, and the Players Era Festival. The Jimmy V Classic is accompanied by "Jimmy V Week", a charity appeal across ESPN's networks for the V Foundation for Cancer Research. The event traditionally includes an airing of Jim Valvano's speech at the 1993 ESPY Awards, where he addressed his condition and announced the formation of the charity.

The final week of the regular season is branded as "Bracket Builder Week" (formerly "Judgment Week") and highlights games involving possible contenders for the NCAA tournament, while "Champ Week" (formerly "Championship Week") is used as the blanket branding for coverage of conference tournaments. ESPN formerly broadcast other in-season events, including

- The Tip-Off Marathon, held from 2008 through 2017, was a marathon of live games and other studio programs across ESPN's networks to mark the first day of the college basketball season. The first edition of the event on November 18, 2008, featured 14 games and 33 hours of programming across ESPN, ESPN2, and ESPNU, beginning with a late-night tripleheader that started at 12:00 a.m. ET (9 p.m. PT) with games from Memphis, Saint Mary's (CA), and Hawaii.
- Until 2014, ESPN scheduled an annual slate of games known as BracketBusters, which showcased teams in mid-major conferences that were potential at-large selections for the NCAA tournament.
- ESPNU Campus Connection Week (originally "Student Spirit Week") was formerly featured across a week of game broadcasts in January, which featured segments profiling student-athletes, students taking on selected production and on-air roles, student-produced segments aired during games, and reports from student sections.

==== Post-season tournaments ====
ESPN has held exclusive rights to the NCAA Division I women's basketball tournament since 1996, with all games airing on an ESPN network or ABC; the Women's Final Four is carried by ESPN, while the national championship has aired on ABC since 2023.

ESPN has aired the National Invitation Tournament since 1989. While domestic rights to the NCAA men's tournament are held by CBS and Turner Sports, ESPN International distributes coverage of the tournament internationally, and produces its own feed of the Final Four and championship game using the ESPN College Basketball staff. In 2013, ESPN International's Final Four coverage was called by Dan Shulman and Dick Vitale (alternatively joined by Brad Nessler for one of the semi-final games).

=== Non-games ===
ESPN has traditionally aired coverage of non-game action including Midnight Madness, which it helped popularize by airing the first practices.

College GameDay which grew as a spin-off of the popular football series is a weekly series that airs during conference play and post-season action. The main difference however is that the sites are pre-determined based on the location of the Saturday Primetime match-up. The show incorporates many of the features and is similar to the football edition.

During the NCAA tournament, many ESPN personalities including Dick Vitale appear to discuss the tournament. In addition during the Final Four, there is an on-location set. Typically special editions of College GameDay and SportsCenter appear during this time. In 2017, ESPN first held the Tournament Challenge Marathon—a 24-hour-long marathon of programming (including special editions of existing ESPN studio shows) devoted to bracketology that began following its selection shows for the NIT and NCAA Division I women's tournament. The event is co-promoted with ESPN.com's ESPN Tournament Challenge bracket game, and contained charity appeals for the V Foundation. The event was revived in 2018, with a 25-hour marathon of tournament-related programming.

=== Women's coverage ===
ESPN has greatly expanded its coverage of the women's game, which now includes the entire NCAA Women's Division I Basketball Championship tournament, culminating with the Final Four. They air many of the same pre-season and conference tournaments as the men do including Jimmy V Women's Basketball Classic, Holiday Hoops, ESPNU Campus Connection Week, February Frenzy, Rivalry Week, and Championship Week. The season begins with the State Farm Tip-Off Classic. ESPN2 airs a weekly Big Monday game in primetime. In addition, ESPN airs the Maggie Dixon Classic. The Women's Selection Show is aired on ESPN including bonus coverage on ESPNU on Selection Monday after many years of being overshadowed by the men's show.

=== Criticism ===
ESPN is often accused of having a bias towards certain teams, including the Atlantic Coast Conference (ACC), particularly the Duke Blue Devils and North Carolina Tar Heels. ESPN and the ACC have a rights deal that extends through the 2026–27 season which provides additional football, men's and women's basketball and Olympic sports coverage on a variety of platforms, suggesting the bias may have a financial motivation. In addition, ESPN has also been very fond of the Kentucky Wildcats as most of ESPN's Super Tuesday weeks usually tends to feature a game involving Kentucky, even when it is playing against one of the lesser SEC teams.

Dick Vitale is often criticized for being a "homer" for Duke, especially for former coach Mike Krzyzewski, as well as most teams in the ACC. For example, a February 28, 2017 game between Indiana vs. Purdue game was scheduled to be on ESPN but was demoted to ESPN2 in favor of Florida State vs. Duke. He is also known for mentioning Duke frequently during broadcasts, even when Duke is not playing. Temple head coach John Chaney once said "You can't get Dick Vitale to say 15 words without Duke coming out of his mouth". He is sometimes called "Duke Vitale" or "Dookie V", a take-off on his "Dickie V" nickname, by detractors for the same reason. Although his bias towards Duke is widely speculated, he is also believed to favor the entire ACC in general, including Duke's rival, North Carolina as well as Kentucky.

A large number of college basketball games are covered off-site, with announcers watching games on television at a studio at Bristol or Los Angeles. For instance, some 2016 NCAA Women's Division I Basketball Championship games are produced off-site.

== Typical games ==
During the regular season, typical games that are shown almost every year on the ESPN family of networks include Duke-North Carolina, Florida-Kentucky, Texas Tech-Baylor, Gonzaga-Saint Mary's, and Kansas-Kansas State.

Championship Week always features most Division I conference tournaments including expanding coverage of the "major" conferences. The "mid-major" and/or "low-major" conferences will typically only get the latter rounds of the tournaments or only the conference championship game carried.

== Personalities ==
=== Present ===
==== Play-by-play ====
- Dan Shulman (Men's)
- Dave O'Brien (Men's)
- Jon Sciambi (Men's)
- Wes Durham (Men's)
- Kevin Fitzgerald (Men's)
- Ryan Ruocco (Women's)
- Beth Mowins (Men's and Women's)

==== Color commentators ====
- Mark Adams (Men's)
- Debbie Antonelli (Men's and Women's)
- Jay Bilas (Men's)
- Jimmy Dykes (Men's)
- Sean Farnham (Men's)
- Cory Alexander (Men's)
- Fran Fraschilla (Men's)
- Rebecca Lobo (Women's)
- Stephanie White (Women's)
- Andraya Carter (Women's)
- Carolyn Peck (Women's)
- Christy Thomaskutt (Women's)

==== Sideline reporters ====
- Kris Budden (Women's)
- Holly Rowe (Women's)

=== Past ===
==== Play-by-play ====
- Jim Kelly
- Brent Musburger
- Mike Tirico

==== Color commentators ====
- Hubie Brown
- Quinn Buckner
- Bill Walton

==== Sideline reporters ====
- Doris Burke

==== Studio hosts ====
- Mike Tirico

== See also ==
- Men's college basketball on television
- College GameNight
- College Basketball on ABC
- College Basketball on CBS
- College Basketball on NBC
- CBS Sports Network
- Big Ten Network
- MountainWest Sports Network
