= Men's college basketball on television =

Men's college basketball on television includes the broadcasting of college basketball games, as well as pre- and post-game reports, analysis, and human-interest stories. Within the United States, the college version of basketball annually garners high television ratings.

Not all games are televised. Coverage is dependent on negotiations between the broadcaster and the college basketball conference or team. In general, major programs will be televised more often than smaller programs. The televised games may change from year-to-year depending on which teams are having a strong season, although some traditional rivalry games are broadcast each year. Major match-ups between top-ranked teams or major rivals are often broadcast nationally. Some games are traditionally associated with a specific event or holiday, and viewing the game itself can become a holiday tradition for fans.

== History ==
College basketball was first televised during the "experimental" era of television's broadcasting history, when W2XBS broadcast a men's basketball doubleheader from Madison Square Garden in New York City on February 28, 1940. Fordham University and the University of Pittsburgh played in the first game, and New York University played Georgetown University in the second game.

In 1968, the "Game of the Century", played between UCLA and Houston, was syndicated by the TVS Television Network, attracting a significant television audience. The game is widely cited as a catalyst for the explosion and expansion of the televised college basketball landscape.

== Broadcast rights ==
=== Networks ===
In addition, some regional syndicators broadcast games on over the air television. Most notably, Raycom Sports syndicate their games to broadcast stations. ESPN Plus, which was a syndication unit of ESPN, also previously syndicated basketball games from various conferences to stations until its 2014 closure in the wake of Big 12 games moving to the ESPN cable networks, and the inception of the cable-only SEC Network. In 2014, Sinclair Broadcasting launched a new syndication programming service, the American Sports Network, to syndicate basketball games in various areas of the country, including a few NCAA Division II games (beginning in 2016).

Raycom in the early 1990s paid ABC $1.8 million for six weeks of network airtime of 26 regional games. The format allowed Raycom to control the games and sell the advertising.

=== Conference/School-specific stations ===
In September 2006, the Mountain West Conference was the first to launch a conference-exclusive television network named MountainWest Sports Network. In August of the following year, the Big Ten followed suit with the launch of the Big Ten Network. In 2014, ESPN and the Southeastern Conference launched the SEC Network. In August 2019, the ACC launched the ACC Network, which obtained the rights from the ACC Network syndication package that were previously held by Raycom.

The Pac-12 Networks debuted in 2012 and shut down on July 1, 2024 at midnight PT.

BYU launched their channel, BYUtv, in 2000. With BYU joining the Big 12 in the 2023–24 season, BYUtv ceased carrying Cougars sports telecasts, due to a contract with ESPN+ to hold the third-tier media rights of all teams in the conference. The telecasts are still produced by BYU staff, and BYUtv continues to carry studio programming.

Texas launched their own channel, Longhorn Network, in the fall of 2011. As a result of the school's move to the SEC, the channel shut down in 2024.

=== ESPN ===
ESPN has been airing regular-season games since 1980, ESPN2 since 1993, and ESPNU since 2005.

College basketball has been a staple for nearly the whole history of ESPN. Scotty Connal, then-vice president of the all-sports network in Bristol, Conn., offered Dick Vitale a position, shortly after being fired from the Detroit Pistons. The coverage of college basketball and the early rounds of the NCAA tournament increased both college basketball and ESPN's credibility.

=== Virtual Reality ===
In 2016, Fox partnered with NextVR to live stream four Big East Conference games in virtual reality.

=== Current lineup ===
By home team

- ABC and ESPN networks (ESPN, ESPN2, ESPNU, ESPNews, and ESPN+): A10, ACC, America East, American, ASUN, Big 12, Big East, Big Sky, Big South, Big West, C-USA, Horizon, Ivy, MAC, MEAC, Metro, MVC, NEC, OVC, Patriot, SBC, SEC, SLC, SoCon, SWAC, UAC and WCC
- CBS/CBS Sports Network: A10, ACC, Big 12, C-USA, CAA, MAC, Mountain West, MVC, Pac-12, Patriot, SLC, Summit, WCC and NCAA tournament
- The CW/ESPN Unlimited: ACC, Mountain West and Pac-12
- Fox networks (Fox, FS1 and FS2): Big 12, Big East, Big Ten and Mountain West
- ACC Network: ACC
- Big Ten Network: Big Ten
- FloSports: CAA
- HBCU GO: SWAC
- Mountain West+: Mountain West
- MVC TV Network: MVC
- NBC networks (Peacock, NBC and NBCSN): Big 12, Big East and Big Ten
- NEC Front Row: NEC
- Ryz Sports Network: NEC
- SEC Network: SEC
- SWAC.TV: SWAC
- TNT networks (TBS, TNT and truTV): Big 12, Big East and NCAA tournament
- USA: A10 and Pac-12

== Postseason ==
=== NCAA tournament ===
In 1974, Brent Musburger started using the term March Madness when describing the tournament.

In 1991, CBS received exclusive rights to the entire tournament for the first time. Previously, ESPN had aired early round games. Beginning in 2011, CBS shared the early tournament rounds with TBS, TNT, and TruTV. The Final Four and Championship began alternating between CBS and TBS in 2016.
