= Andy Katz =

American journalist (born 1968)

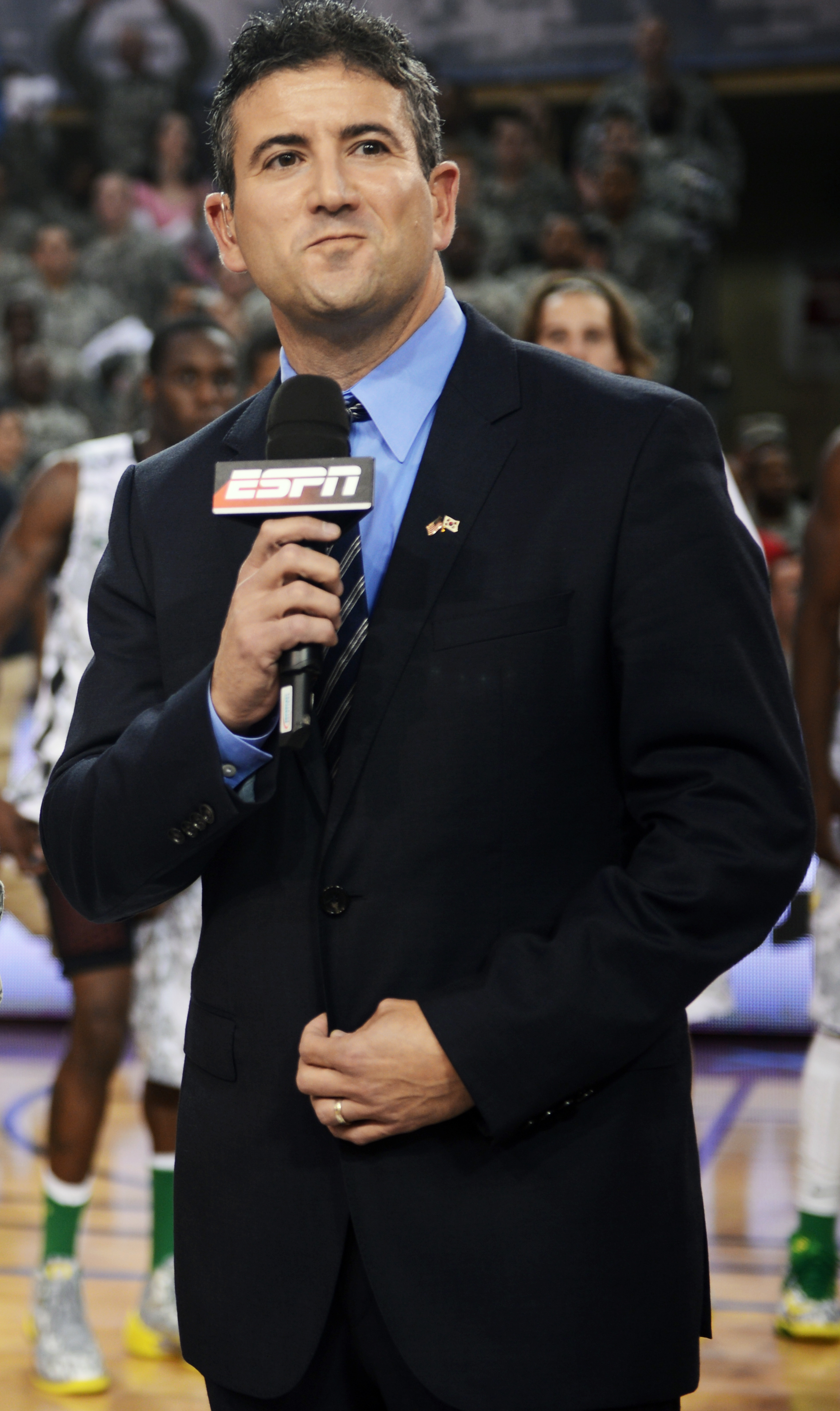
- Katz in November 2013
- Born: April 7, 1968 (age 58); Newton, Massachusetts, U.S.
- Education: University of Wisconsin, Madison; B.A., History & Political Science (1990)
- Occupation: sports reporter (basketball)
- Years active: 1989-present
- Employer: ESPN (2000-2017) Big Ten Network (2017-present)
- Title: Senior Writer
- Board member of: former board member, United States Basketball Writers Association

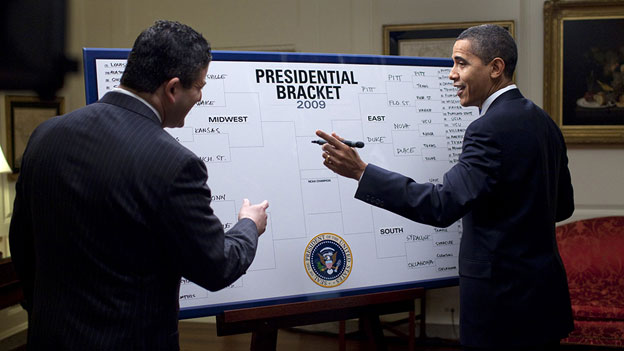
President Obama fills out his picks for the NCAA Men's Div I Tournament with ESPN's Andy Katz. President Barack Obama picked North Carolina to win the National Championship when he shared his "Barack-etology" with Katz on March 18, 2009. Other teams in his Final Four were Pittsburgh, Louisville, and Memphis.

Andrew D. Katz (born April 7, 1968) is a college basketball analyst for the Big Ten Network and a college basketball correspondent for the NCAA. He formerly worked as a senior college basketball journalist for ESPN.com, and was a regular sports analyst on College GameNight on ESPN. Katz earned a B.A. at the University of Wisconsin–Madison (1990), and began working for ESPN in 2000.

== Career ==
Katz first started in sports journalism as play-by-play for Newton North and Newton South High School games in 1985 as a senior in high school, and then at The Daily Cardinal, Wisconsin State Journal, and Milwaukee Journal in college. Before Katz joined ESPN, he was a sports reporter for The Fresno Bee (1995–1999); the Albuquerque Journal (1990–1995); and the Milwaukee Journal Sentinel (1989–1990)

At ESPN, Katz had a notable incident for mispronouncing "bulging discs" during coverage of the 2012 NBA draft. He profiled Barack Obama's love of basketball as part of ESPN's coverage of the 2008 United States presidential election, which later resulted in eight appearances of "Barack-etology" during his presidency. He also was a primary backup to Bob Ley on Outside The Lines, ESPN's sports investigative journalism program. On April 26, 2017, Katz was among over 100 employees laid off by ESPN.

After leaving ESPN, Katz did color commentary for the Paradise Jam tournament held in Lynchburg, VA. Later in 2017, Katz took on a role with the Big Ten Network as a studio analyst. Since then, he expanded his role to include color commentary and sideline reporting, and appears on NCAA March Madness as a sideline reporter and studio analyst during the tournament as part of his role with the NCAA. He also makes appearances on NBA TV and FoxSports.com.

In January 2026, Katz and acclaimed college basketball analyst Seth Davis launched The Hoops HQ Show, a new talk show on Fubo Sports Network and YouTube covering all things college basketball, including breaking news, pre and post-game analysis, and hot takes. The show is produced by Hoops HQ, Davis and InsideHook's subscription-based sports media platform, on which Katz is a senior correspondent.

== Sources ==
- Andy Katz ESPN Bio
