= Lisa Byington =

American athlete and journalist

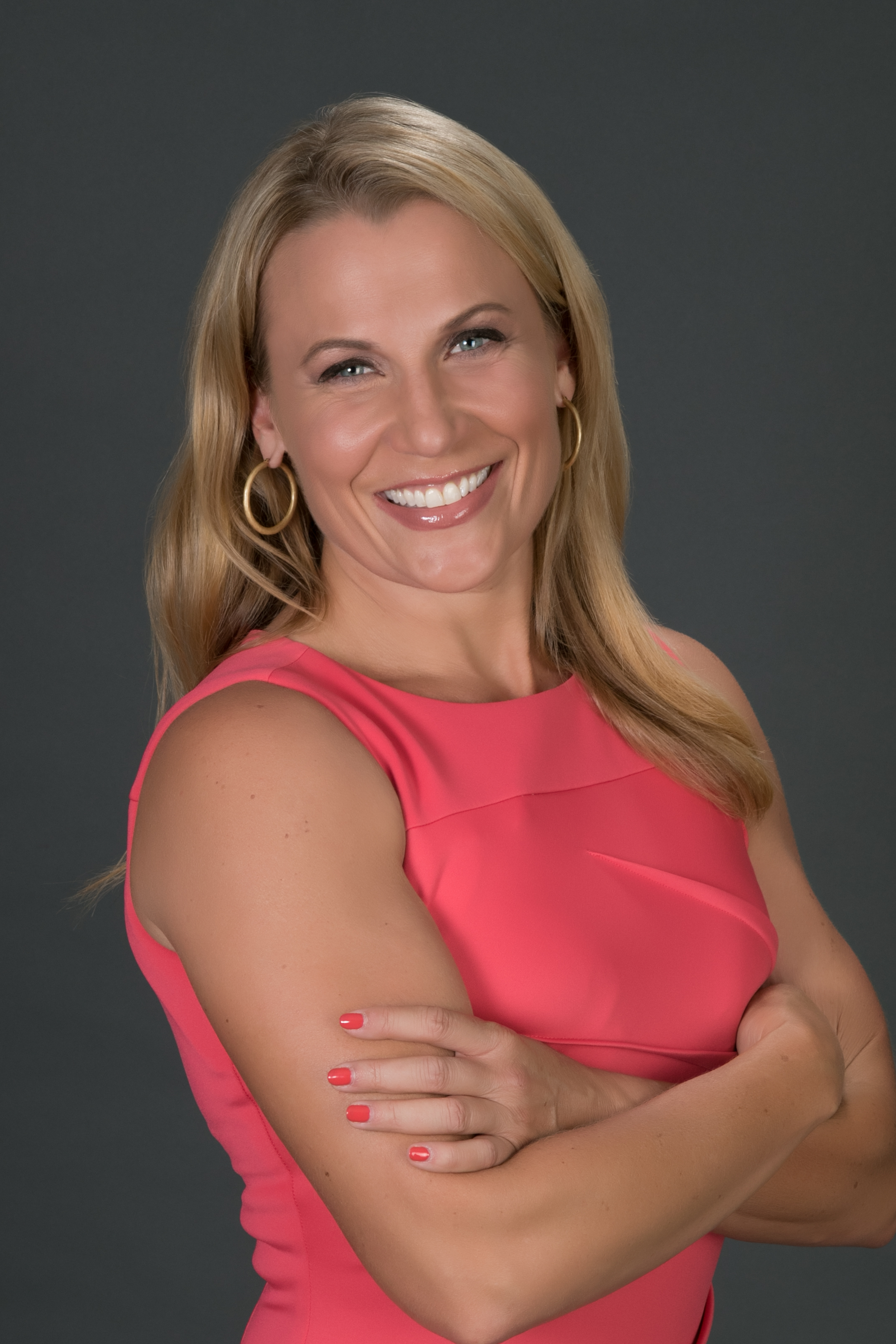
- Byington in 2015
- Born: May 18, 1976 (age 50)
- Education: Northwestern University
- Sports commentary career
- Genre: Play-by-play
- Sports: Basketball, Soccer
Association football career
- Position: Forward
College career
Years	Team	Apps	(Gls)
1997–1998	Northwestern Wildcats		

Lisa Byington (born May 18, 1976) is an American play-by-play announcer, studio host, and feature producer/reporter. She has broadcast games for Fox Sports, FS1, Big Ten Network, CBS, Turner Sports, Marquee Sports Network, Pac-12 Network, ESPN, and the SEC Network.

== Education ==
Byington, a native of Portage, Michigan, was a two-sport athlete at Northwestern University, playing four years of basketball and two years of soccer. Both teams made the NCAA Tournament.

== Career ==
Byington has worked primarily as a play-by-play announcer and reporter on FOX Sports and Big Ten Network's coverage of college football and basketball games. In 2017, Byington became the first female play-by-play to call a college football game for the Big Ten Network.

Byington announced the 2019 Women's World Cup for Fox and the 2020 Olympic Games as a play-by-play announcer for men's and women's soccer. Byington has also worked as a sideline reporter for the NCAA men's basketball tournament with CBS and Turner since 2017. On March 19, 2021, she became the first woman to do play-by-play in March Madness history for CBS and Turner Sports.

In 2021, Byington became the first female full-time play-by-play voice for a major men's professional sports team when she became the full time play-by-play announcer of the Milwaukee Bucks. Byington also handles play-by-play work for the WNBA’s Chicago Sky.
