= Evan Washburn =

American sports journalist and reporter (born 1984)

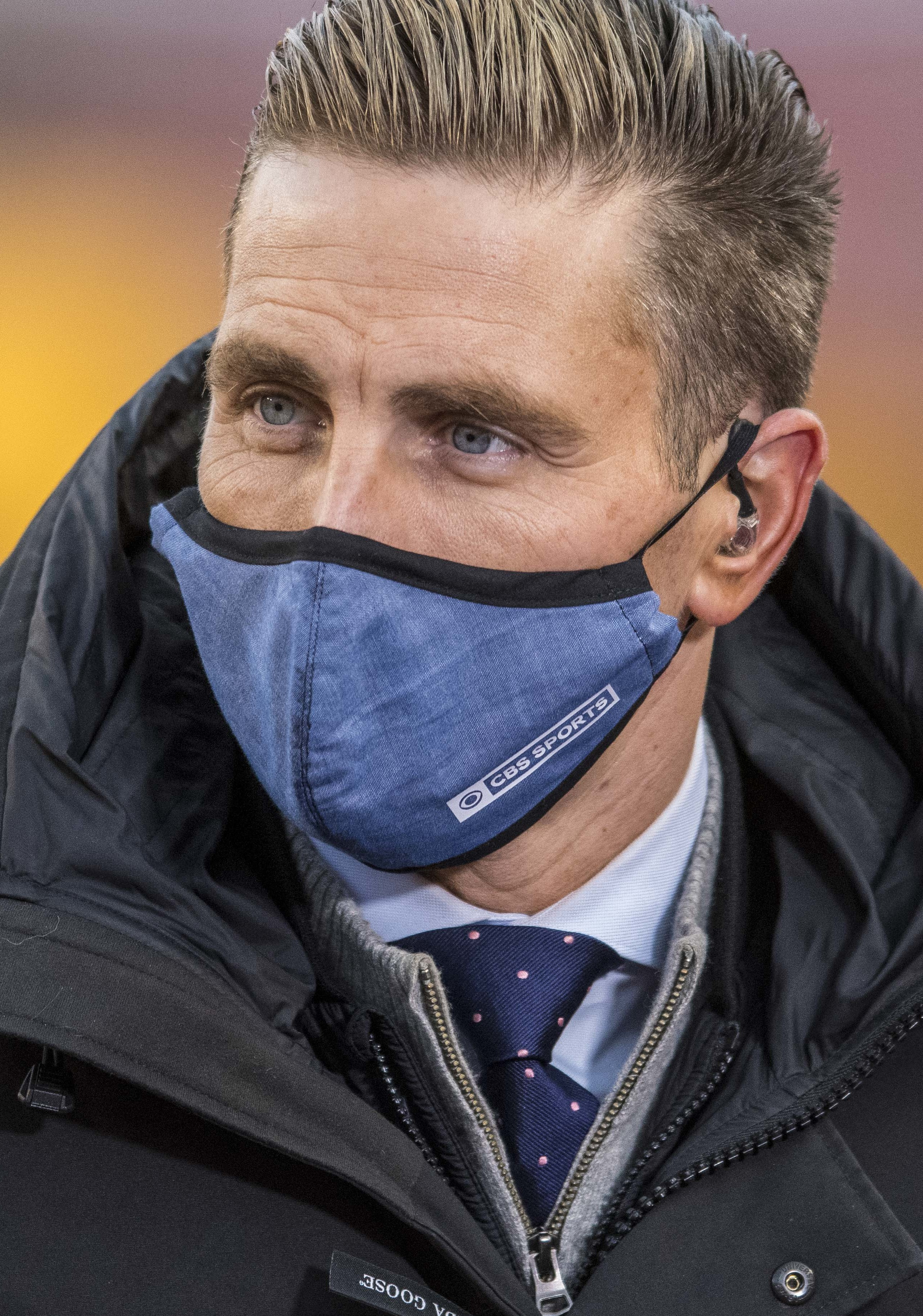
- Washburn in 2020
- Born: September 25, 1984 (age 42); Annapolis, Maryland, U.S.
- Occupation: Sports journalist
- Spouse: Kate Washburn (m. 2014)
- Children: 1

Evan Washburn (born September 25, 1984) is an American reporter for CBS Sports. He joined CBS in 2014, and is a part of the network's coverage of the NFL and NCAA basketball, along with contributing to CBS Sports Network. He is also the sideline reporter for the local TV broadcasts of the Baltimore Ravens pre-season games.

== College ==
Washburn graduated from the University of Delaware in 2008 with a bachelor’s degree in Journalism. He played college lacrosse for four years, leading Delaware to the NCAA Tournament Final Four in 2007. As team captain in 2008, he was selected All-CAA Conference First Team.

== Career ==
Washburn joined CBS Sports in 2014, serving for their coverage of NFL, the NCAA Men’s Basketball Tournament and lacrosse (as an analyst drawing on his experience with the Delaware Fightin’ Blue Hens ). Working with CBS Sports coverage of the NFL, Washburn was on the sidelines as a reporter for Super Bowl 50 in 2016 and Super Bowl LIII in 2019.

== Personal life ==
Washburn married Kate Washburn in 2014 and they had their first child, a boy, Hudson, in 2016.
