= Hughes Television Network =

American television network and production company

- The Hughes Television Network logo in 1979, preceding an NHL Network broadcast.
- Type: Occasional broadcast television network

Ownership
- Key people: Joseph M. Cohen

History
- Founded: December 1955; 70 years ago
- Launched: 1956; 70 years ago
- Founder: Dick Bailey
- Former names: Sports Network

HTN Communications, better known as Hughes Television Network (HTN) and formerly Sports Network, was an American television network created by Richard Eugene Bailey. The company is now in the business of providing video and audio services to sports networks.

It never lived up to its dream of being the nation's fourth television network, following the demise of the DuMont Television Network. HTN limited itself to broadcasting sports events, including the Stanley Cup Final, PBA Bowling and special programming, including the Muppets special The Frog Prince, and provided facilities links to a loose network of stations, who were usually independents or affiliates of ABC, CBS, or NBC.

In 2013, HTN Communications merged with The Switch.

== History ==
=== Sports Network Incorporated ===
Originally working as chief network coordinator at ABC in 1954, Richard Eugene Bailey conceived of a cost-effective means of broadcasting away Major League Baseball games to their home cities. The idea came from the BBDO advertising agency, who appealed to Bailey on behalf of advertisers, Schaefer Beer and Lucky Strike cigarettes, to save money on their broadcast of Brooklyn Dodgers games; Bailey came up with the concept of "streamlining transmission operations." This innovation for covering away games became the basis for the Sports Network.

Bailey capitalized his company with $1,000. In December 1956, Bailey met with sponsors, ad agencies and the baseball teams' representatives at Chicago's Hotel Knickerbocker to get SNI off the ground. In 1956, the first operational year, the network had 300 television and 1,200 radio broadcasts of major league baseball games.

In the fall 1956, SNI started showing Cleveland Browns football games. In later years, they acquired rights to Big Ten and Atlantic Coast Conference basketball. SNI's coverage of the 1963 NCAA final, where Loyola University Chicago upset the University of Cincinnati, was a ratings smash, with a larger audience than CBS' hit westerns Have Gun – Will Travel and Gunsmoke.

By the early sixties, the Browns (still on SNI) were the only NFL team not signed to a major TV network. At the insistence of new commissioner Pete Rozelle, the Browns dropped SNI when the entire league signed a collective television contract with CBS in 1962.

=== Hughes Television Network ===
After Howard Hughes failed to purchase a controlling interest in ABC in 1968, Hughes' Hughes Tool Company purchased the Sports Network and renamed it the Hughes Television Network, with Dick Bailey continuing as president. On a staggered schedule in May 1971, The Frog Prince was shown on HTN with 150 stations including WCBS-TV and sponsored by RJR Foods. During the 1973–74 ABA season, the American Basketball Association had signed a contract with the Hughes Television Network to air games on its network in an attempt to gain financial stability during what became the league's last few years of existence.

Paramount Pictures purchased the Network including its satellite time in planning for the Paramount Programming Service in 1976. After the planned network's launch was scuttled in 1978, Paramount sold HTN to Madison Square Garden in 1979. In 1986, Joseph M. Cohen, a Madison Square Garden executive, led an investment group in purchasing HTN from Madison Square Garden. IDB Communications purchased the company in 1989.

In March, 1991, HTN purchased fiber optic transmission services from Vyvx NVN to supplement its existing satellite network. In 1995, HTN was purchased by Globecast.

In 2003, Cohen acquired the Network again.

== Programming ==
As Sports Network, the Network broadcast on a network basis sports programming in the following sports: auto racing, baseball, basketball (pro and college), bowling, boxing, dog shows, football (pro and college), frostbite sailing, golf, gymnastics, horse racing, iceboating, ice hockey, jai alai, lacrosse, polo, skiing, soccer, swimming, tennis, track and wrestling.

SNI pick up rights for:

- Cleveland Browns football games (1956–1959)
- Big Ten Conference basketball
- Atlantic Coast Conference basketball
- 1963 Bing Crosby pro-amateur golf tournament
- PGA National Tour program
- 1963 NCAA Men's Division I Basketball Tournament
- 1974 ABA All-Star Game

=== Monday Night Football ===
According to the book Monday Night Mayhem (Reed Business Information, 1988), the National Football League received a bid from HTN for broadcast rights to Monday Night Football; this, while negotiations with ABC were nearing a standoff. HTN was reportedly offering a significantly higher price than any other network, including ABC. Reportedly, had Hughes made the deal, about half of ABC's affiliates would have carried the HTN football games anyway, including at least one ABC owned-and-operated station. Ultimately, the league agreed that it would be in the NFL's best interests to sign with an established network, eventually striking a deal with ABC for a lower amount than Hughes was offering.

=== Cleveland Browns broadcasters ===
- 1956 Browns – Ken Coleman/Otto Graham
- 1957 Browns – Ken Coleman/Jimmy Dudley
- 1958 Browns – Ken Coleman/Jimmy Dudley
- 1959 Browns – Ken Coleman/Jimmy Dudley
- 1960 Browns – Ken Coleman/Jimmy Dudley
- 1961 Browns – Ken Coleman/Cliff Lewis

== See also ==
- KLAS-TV
- The NHL Network (1975–79)
- Mobil Showcase Network
- Fourth television network

Preceded by NHL Network	NHL network broadcast partner in the United States (with CBS); 1980	Succeeded by None
Preceded by ABC	NCAA Men's Division I Basketball Championship television broadcaster 1963 – 1968	Succeeded by NBC
