= Bill Raftery =

American basketball player-coach and current broadcaster for college basketball

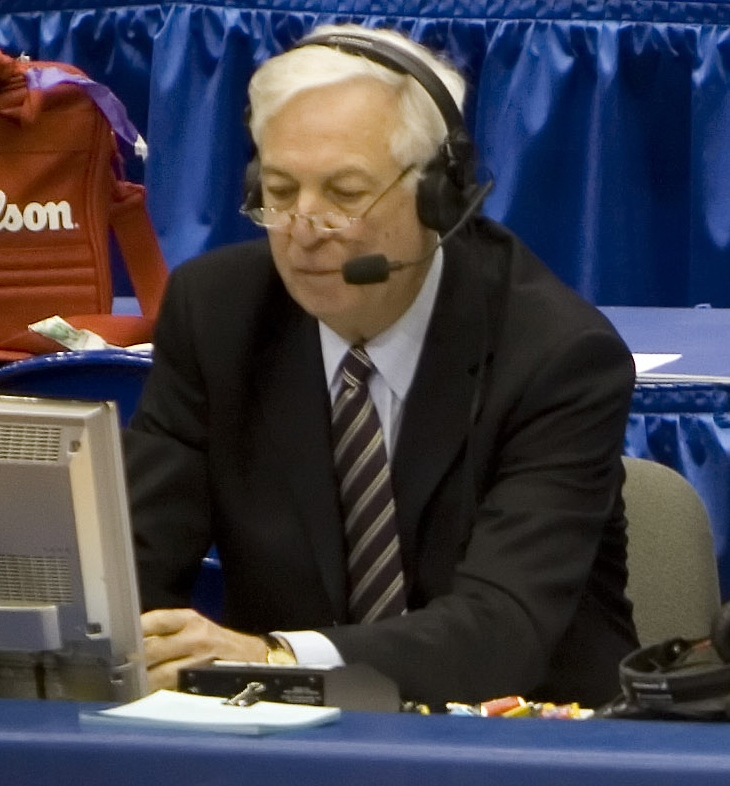
- Raftery at the 2009 NCAA tournament

Personal information
- Born: Orange, New Jersey, U.S.

Career information
- High school: Saint Cecilia (Kearny, New Jersey)
- College: La Salle (1960–1963)
- NBA draft: 1963: 14th round, 82nd overall pick
- Drafted by: New York Knicks
- Position: Guard
- Coaching career: 1963–1981

Career highlights
- As player: Mr. Basketball USA (1959); First-team Parade All-American (1959); As head coach: NJ-NY 7 regular season champion (1977)
- Stats at Basketball Reference

William Joseph Raftery (born April 19, 1941) is an American basketball analyst and former college basketball coach.

== Early life and playing years ==
Born William Joseph Raftery in Orange, New Jersey, and raised in nearby Kearny, Raftery grew up in a Catholic family with Irish immigrant parents, Francis and Margaret. He had a brother, Francis, and a sister, Rita, who was a Catholic nun (Sr. Francis Raftery) who served as president of the College of Saint Elizabeth.

Raftery graduated in 1959 from the now defunct St. Cecilia High School in Kearny, where he starred in basketball and became the all-time leading scorer in state history with 2,193 points, a record he held for nine years. (Shaheen Holloway, one of his successors as head coach at Seton Hall University, scored 42 fewer points and Kyrie Irving had 113 fewer as New Jersey high school players.) In 1959, among high school basketball teams in New Jersey that were non-public, Raftery was awarded all-state honors and led his team to a state championship. He was also named all-state in baseball and soccer. He has been named, retroactively, Mr. Basketball USA for 1959.

Raftery played for the La Salle Explorers men's basketball team under coach Donald "Dudey" Moore. During his freshman year he scored a freshman record 370 points, followed by a team leading 17.8 points per game in his sophomore year. As a senior, he co-captained the Explorers to the National Invitation Tournament. Just before graduating with a B.A. in history, he was selected in the 14th round (82nd overall) of the 1963 NBA draft by the New York Knicks, but he never played in the NBA.

== Coaching career ==
Raftery began his coaching career at Fairleigh Dickinson University at Madison (now in Florham Park, New Jersey) where he was the head basketball coach from 1963 to 1968. There, Raftery also coached golf and served as associate athletic director.

From 1970 to 1981, Raftery was the head coach of the Seton Hall Pirates, where he posted a 154–141 record and led the team to four ECAC postseason tournaments and two National Invitational Tournament appearances. In 1979, he was named Coach of the Year by the New Jersey Sports Writers Association. His 154 wins as a coach places him fifth on the all-time list at Seton Hall behind Honey Russell, P. J. Carlesimo, Frank Hill, and Kevin Willard.

=== Head coaching record ===
Record table
Season	Team	Overall	Conference	Standing	Postseason
Fairleigh Dickinson–Madison Devils (NCAA College Division independent) (1963–1968)
1963–64	Fairleigh Dickinson–Madison	8–10			
1964–65	Fairleigh Dickinson–Madison	10–12			
1965–66	Fairleigh Dickinson–Madison	12–10			
1966–67	Fairleigh Dickinson–Madison	15–9			
1967–68	Fairleigh Dickinson–Madison	18–6			
Fairleigh Dickinson–Madison:		63–47			
Seton Hall Pirates (NCAA University Division / Division I independent) (1970–1976)
1970–71	Seton Hall	11–15			
1971–72	Seton Hall	10–16			
1972–73	Seton Hall	8–17			
1973–74	Seton Hall	16–11			NIT First Round
1974–75	Seton Hall	16–11			
1975–76	Seton Hall	18–9			
Seton Hall Pirates (New Jersey-New York 7 Conference) (1976–1979)
1976–77	Seton Hall	18–11	3–1	T–1st	NIT First Round
1977–78	Seton Hall	16–11	1–5	6th	
1978–79	Seton Hall	16–11	5–1	2nd	
Seton Hall Pirates (Big East Conference) (1979–1981)
1979–80	Seton Hall	14–13	1–5	6th	
1980–81	Seton Hall	11–16	4–10	7th	
Seton Hall:		154–141	14–22		
Total:		217–188			
National champion Postseason invitational champion Conference regular season champion Conference regular season and conference tournament champion Division regular season champion Division regular season and conference tournament champion Conference tournament champion

== Broadcasting career ==
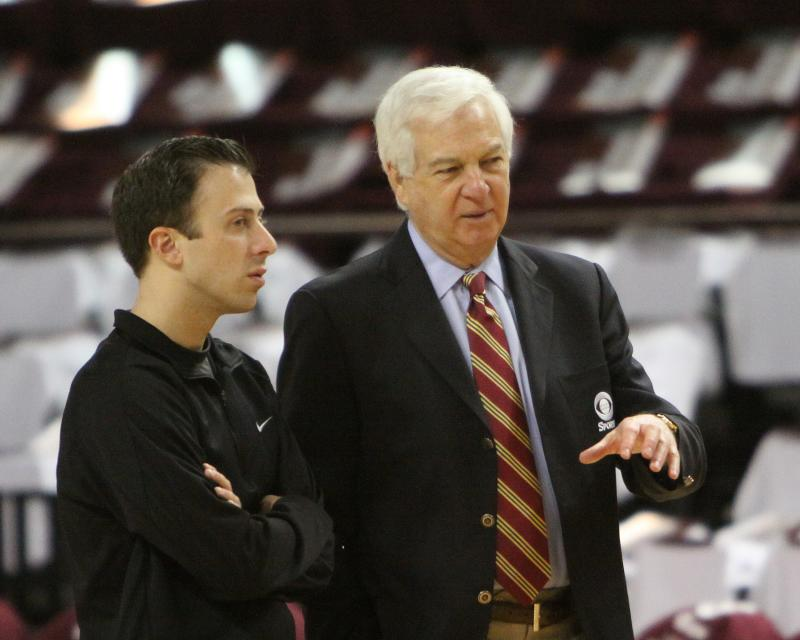
Richard Pitino and Raftery (right) in 2011

Raftery said it was during his senior year in college, when La Salle was competing in the NIT, that legendary New York sportscaster Bob Wolff suggested he eventually consider a career in broadcasting. “It always stuck in my head,” Raftery said. “It was just one of those things in the back of my head, and I said, ‘This will keep me in the game that I enjoy.’”

He began his broadcasting career as co-host of ESPN’s College Hoops Tonight in 1980. He began calling New Jersey Nets games in 1982.

Raftery has served as an analyst and color commentator for CBS Sports' college basketball coverage since 1983. During CBS' coverage of March Madness, Raftery had long partnerships with James Brown (1990–93) and Sean McDonough (1995–99) but rose to prominence during his 15-year partnership (2000–14) with Verne Lundquist.

During the 2014–15 collegiate basketball season, CBS/Turner Sports partnered Raftery with Jim Nantz and Grant Hill to make up the primary announcing team for the remainder of the regular season following the arrest of Greg Anthony for soliciting a prostitute, all the way through the NCAA men's basketball tournament and the Final Four.

Raftery was also an analyst with ESPN, primarily partnered with Sean McDonough and Jay Bilas and formerly Mike Gorman for Big East games.

Before CBS elevated him to their primary announcing team, he served as an analyst for CBS Radio/Westwood One's coverage of the NCAA Men's Final Four from 1991 to 2014 working in later years with Kevin Kugler and John Thompson.

After the media rights for the Big East moved from ESPN to Fox Sports in 2013, Raftery signed with Fox Sports to call Big East basketball games on the upstart network Fox Sports 1 with Gus Johnson.

Raftery was also the lead analyst for the Nets (prior to the franchise's move to Brooklyn) for over 20 years until 2002 and was an on-course commentator for PGA Tour Champions Tour events. While at CBS he also worked as an analyst for select NBA games, paired with Brent Musburger and Dick Stockton.

Beginning with the 2024 NCAA Tournament, Raftery has been paired with Ian Eagle, his former partner with the Nets and frequent regular season college basketball partner.

His trademark quotes include:

- "Onions!" (when a shot is made late in a close game),
- "Send it in big fella!" (when a post player makes a slam dunk),
- "With a little kiss!" (when a shot banks in, usually in a nonstandard way),
- "A little nickel-dimer!" (when a soft foul is called)
- "Get the puppies organized!" (in reference to good footwork)
- "A little lingerie on the deck!" (when a player makes a nifty move with the ball and fakes out the defender).
- "Man-to-man!", which he announces at the start of the game if the defense comes out playing man-to-man defense rather than zone.

Additionally, he is remembered for "Send It In, Jerome!", his call immediately after Jerome Lane of the University of Pittsburgh shattered the backboard with a powerful dunk during a January 25, 1988 game against Providence.

== Awards and honors ==
- Sports Broadcasting Hall of Fame (2017)
- NSSA Hall of Fame (2015)
- Curt Gowdy Media Award from Naismith Memorial Basketball Hall of Fame (2006)
- Four-time Sports Emmy Award winner for Outstanding Sports Event Analyst
- La Salle University Hall of Athletes (2004)
- Fairleigh Dickinson Athletics Hall of Fame inductee (1997)
- Coach of the Year by the New Jersey Basketball Writers Association (1979)

== Other ventures ==
Aside from his commentating duties, Raftery was also the president of W.J. Raftery Associates, an event/marketing firm.

== Personal life ==
Raftery earned an M.A.E. in education from Seton Hall University in 1966. In 2001, he received an honorary doctorate from La Salle.

Raftery and his wife, the former Joan Fleming, live in Florida. Previously they lived in Florham Park, New Jersey, where they raised four children, Billy, Kristi, Kelli and Suzi. They have five grandchildren.

In 2015, Billy and his father's broadcasting partner, Grant Hill, produced With A Kiss, a documentary about Raftery's first shot at calling the Final Four at age 71. The documentary premiered in 2016, hours before the longtime broadcaster called his second Final Four as a television analyst for CBS Sports. In 2018, Billy and Hill formed Point Road Productions.
