= Seth Davis =

American sportswriter and broadcaster (born 1970)

- Born: 1970 (age 55–56); Connecticut, United States
- Education: Duke University
- Occupations: Writer, author, sports commentator
- Parent(s): Lanny Davis; Elaine Charney

Seth Davis (born 1970) is an American sportswriter and broadcaster. He is currently the Editor-in-Chief and co-founder of Hoops HQ and is a host on Campus Insiders, an in-studio analyst for CBS, Fox Sports, and Big Ten Network men's college basketball coverage and an analyst for the NBA Draft on NBA TV. He writes for The Athletic and is a former writer for Sports Illustrated magazine.

== Biography ==
Davis attended Duke University, graduating in 1992 with a degree in political science. He was host of a sports-related cable television show on Cable 13, also a sports columnist for the university's daily campus newspaper, The Chronicle.

Davis began writing at Sports Illustrated in July 1995. During his tenure at SI, he became a staff writer and authored the "Inside College Basketball" column during the college basketball season. It was announced on May 11, 2017 that he had been laid off from Sports Illustrated. Before joining Sports Illustrated, Davis spent several years at the New Haven Register, where he wrote about various sports, including the NFL, NBA, college basketball and local high school sports.

Davis appeared in an episode of the HBO show Real Sex in 1996.

In 2003, his book Equinunk, Tell Your Story: My Return to Summer Camp about his experiences as a camp counselor, was published. His second book, When March Went Mad, was published in 2009.

He was also a reporter on The NFL Today.

In 2013, Davis joined Campus Insiders, campusinsiders.com, as an on-air host for their all-digital network. The Seth Davis Show launched on August 26, 2013.

In May 2017 he was fired by Sports Illustrated as a cost-cutting measure. He subsequently started work for The Athletic.

In November of 2024, he co-founded and became the Editor-in-Chief of Hoops HQ, a college basketball website that covers men's and women's hoops year-round.

== Personal ==
Davis was born in Connecticut and raised in Potomac, Maryland, and graduated from the Bullis School in 1988. Davis is married and has three children.

Davis is the son of Elaine Charney and Lanny Davis, who was the special counsel for former President Bill Clinton from 1996 to 1998.

== Books ==
- Equinunk, Tell Your Story: My Return to Summer Camp (2002)
- When March Went Mad: The Game That Transformed Basketball (2009)
- Wooden: A Coach's Life (2014)
- Getting to Us: How Great Coaches Make Great Teams (2018)
