= Cycling on NBC =

- Also known as: NBC Sports Cycling
- Genre: Multiple-stage bicycle racing
- Directed by: Kelly Atkinson
- Starring: See commentators section
- Country of origin: United States
- Original language: English

Production
- Producers: David Michaels (coordinating producer); Joel Felicio (live producer)
- Production locations: France and other countries
- Camera setup: Multi-camera
- Running time: 3 1/2 hours
- Production company: NBC Sports

Original release
- Network: NBC; NBCSN; NBC Sports Gold; Peacock; USA Network
- Release: 2011

Related
- Cycling on CBS; Sportsworld Olympics on NBC

Cycling on NBC is the de facto name for broadcasts of multiple-stage bicycle races produced by NBC Sports, the sports division of the NBC television network. This includes broadcasts of the Tour de France, Vuelta a España, UCI World Tour Championships, Tour of California, USA Pro Cycling Challenge, and Liège–Bastogne–Liège.

== Overview ==
=== Coors Classic coverage ===
In 1985, NBC broadcast the Coors International Bicycle Classic as part of its anthology program Sportsworld. Greg Lewis anchored NBC's coverage alongside Connie Carpenter and Alexi Grewal.

=== Tour de Trump coverage ===
From 1989 to 1990, NBC broadcast the Tour de Trump, which was a North American cycling stage race initially sponsored by businessman (and later U.S. President) Donald Trump.

For the very first edition in 1989, Dick Enberg anchored the coverage alongside Gary Gerould and analyst Clif Halsey. Greg Lewis meanwhile, interviewed cyclists after the final stage. NBC would cover at least two weeks worth of action for two hours each on Sunday afternoons while ESPN otherwise, provided the bulk of the coverage.

The following year, NBC announced that it would commit to airing at least six hours worth of the Tour de Trump race. This time, John Tesh anchored NBC's coverage alongside Phil Liggett.

Incidentally, the idea for the race was conceived by John Tesh, who had covered the 1987 Tour de France for CBS and on his return suggested holding a race in the United States to the basketball commentator and entrepreneur Billy Packer. Packer originally planned to call the race the Tour de Jersey. He approached representatives of casinos in Atlantic City for sponsorship, and Donald Trump offered to be the race's primary sponsor and Packer's business partner in the venture. It was Packer who suggested the Tour de Trump name.

=== Tour de France coverage ===
In 1999, NBCSN, then known as Outdoor Life Network (or OLN) acquired the U.S. broadcast rights to the Tour de France for US$3 million. Coverage of the Tour on OLN brought substantially greater viewership to the then fledgling channel, due in part to the then-growing popularity of American rider Lance Armstrong. In 2004, where Armstrong would aim for a record-breaking sixth straight Tour de France title, OLN would devote over 344 hours in July to coverage of the Tour, along with documentaries and other original programming surrounding the event – which was promoted through a US$20 million advertising campaign.

Overall, while its coverage of the Tour de France helped OLN expand its carriage to over 60 million homes, rumors surrounding Armstrong's possible retirement from racing led to concerns over OLN's emphasis on him (to the point that some critics referred to OLN as standing for "Only Lance Network"), with critics questioning whether the network could sustain itself without the viewership that Lance Armstrong's presence had brought to its coverage.

Carriage of the Tour de France continued through OLN's retooling as a mainstream sports channel and rebranding as Versus. In 2011, Versus owner Comcast acquired a majority stake in NBC Universal, and merged its sports cable networks with that company's NBC Sports division. NBC Sports would continue to carry the Tour on Versus, later rebranded as the NBC Sports Network (NBCSN). The 2015 Tour de France saw its highest ratings on NBCSN since 2010, with average viewership increased to 365,000, and stage 8 having nearly a million viewers on NBC.

Beginning in 2016, NBC began to stream additional coverage via a subscription service, including replays, the commercial-free world feed, and other second screen content. This app expanded into the "Cycling Pass" service on NBC Sports Gold in 2017, which would also include coverage of the UCI Road World Championships, Colorado Classic, and Volta a Catalunya.

After the discontinuation of OLN's successor NBCSN at the end of 2021, linear television coverage of the Tour de France moved to other NBCUniversal cable networks such as USA Network and CNBC. NBCUniversal's streaming service Peacock would also carry all stages . On February 15, 2023, NBC Sports announced that it had renewed its media rights to broadcast the Tour de France through 2029. Beginning in 2024, cable simulcasts will be discontinued, with all stages becoming exclusive to Peacock, and occasional stages simulcast by NBC.

==== CNBC's coverage ====
In 2015, CNBC aired portions of the 2015 UCI Road Cycling World Championships.

In 2020, CNBC aired Stage 14 and Stage 15 of the Tour de France.

In 2022, CNBC aired stage 8 of the Paris–Nice.

In 2022, CNBC aired portions of the Women's Tour de France.

== Commentators ==
- Adam Blythe – He was an "on-site" reporter for NBC Sports' coverage of the 2020 Tour de France, and fulfilled that role again for 2021.
- Paul Burmeister – He has hosted NBC's studio coverage of the Tour de France.
- Connie Carpenter
- Jenna Corrado
- Chris Horner – In 2019, Horner joined the team of broadcaster NBC for their coverage of the Tour de France, acting as a commentator.
- Todd Gogulski – In 2009, he joined the NBC Universal Sports cycling TV commentary team with Steve Schlanger, with whom he covers the Tour of the Basque Country, the Giro d'Italia, the Vuelta a España, the World Road Championships, Milan–San Remo, and others. For 2011, he joined the Versus Tour de France TV broadcasting team alongside Bob Roll, Phil Liggett, Paul Sherwen, and Liam McHugh.
- Alexi Grewal
- Todd Harris – Harris has acted as host for the network's coverage of the Tour de France.
- Craig Hummer – In 2010, Hummer was host of the daily news segments for Universal Sports' Vancouver Olympic Games coverage. He was an announcer on the Las Vegas Super Sprint in 2014, and became the announcer for La Course, a woman's race produced by Le Tour de France.
- Liam McHugh – In the summer of 2011, McHugh stepped into the role of host for NBC's live daily coverage of the Tour de France.
- Greg Lewis
- Phil Liggett – Liggett has reported on over 15 Olympic Games and 44 Tours de France, generally alongside fellow veteran cycling commentators and former cyclists Paul Sherwen (UK) and Bob Roll (US). Because of his varied assignments, Liggett has worked for all of the American Big Three networks: ABC, CBS, and NBC.
- Carolyn Manno
- Scott Moninger
- Steve Porino
- Bob Roll – He has been a member of the veteran cable television broadcasting team (along with Phil Liggett, MBE and Paul Sherwen) who served as road cycling expert-commentators for the NBC Sports Network cable network's coverage of the Tour de France, Vuelta a España, Giro d'Italia, Paris–Roubaix, Tour of California, and other international cycling road races.
- Steve Schlanger
- Paul Sherwen – Up until the conclusion of the 2016 Tour de France, Sherwen provided the commentary broadcast internationally for many television networks including Australia's SBS Network and the United States' NBC Sports with Phil Liggett.
- John Tesh
- Al Trautwig – He co-anchored coverage of the Tour de France from 2004 to 2007 on Versus (formerly OLN). Despite his years of experience as a broadcaster, he was sometimes criticized by cycling fans, for his occasionally uninformed commentary, and his tendency to compare the Tour to various mainstream sports he has covered.
- Christian Vande Velde – He has been a cycling analyst for NBC Sports since 2014.
- Jens Voigt – After his career, he worked as a TV presenter in Germany and in the USA. In the US he has been part of the NBC Sports coverage team which was initially led by Phil Liggett and Paul Sherwen, and was later led by Liggett and Bob Roll with added commentary from Voigt, Steve Porino, Christian Vande Velde, Paul Burmeister and Chris Horner.
- Laura Winter – She is the NBC reporter and commentator for the Tour of California women's race.

=== Summer Olympics ===
Year	Play-by-play	Color commentator(s)	Field reporter(s)
1988	Gary Gerould	Brian Drebber and Davis Phinney	
1992	John Tesh (road cycling); Phil Liggett (track cycling)	Phil Liggett and Mark Gorski (road cycling); Mark Gorski (track cycling)	Al Trautwig (road cycling)
1996	Al Trautwig	Phil Liggett and Paul Sherwen	
2000	Al Trautwig (road cycling); Phil Liggett (track cycling and mountain biking)	Paul Sherwen (road cycling); Jessica Grieco (track cycling)	
2004	Pat Parnell; Steve Podborski	Paul Sherwen	Robbie Floyd
2008	Pat Parnell; Craig Hummer	Kenan Harkin; Paul Sherwen	Marty Snider
2012	Steve Schlanger (road); Todd Harris (track & BMX)	Paul Sherwen (road & track); Jamie Bestwick (BMX)	Todd Harris
2016	Paul Sherwen	Bob Roll and Christian Vande Velde; Chris Doyle (BMX)	Steve Porino
2020	Steve Schlanger; Todd Harris (BMX)	Bob Roll and Christian Vande Velde; Chris Doyle (BMX)	Steve Porino
