= Cycling on CBS =

- Genre: Multiple-stage bicycle racing
- Directed by: David Michaels
- Starring: Greg Amsinger; Tim Brant; James Brown; John Dockery; Jim Gray; Eric Heiden; Craig Hummer; Armen Keteyian; Bob Neumeier; Phil Liggett; Tim Ryan; Paul Sherwen; John Tesh
- Composers: John Tesh; Yanni; Geoffrey Downes
- Country of origin: United States
- Original language: English

Production
- Executive producers: Ted Shaker; Harold Bryant
- Producers: David Michaels; Victor Frank
- Production locations: France and other countries
- Animator: Post Group
- Editors: Raymond Ek; Stig Johansson
- Camera setup: Multi-camera
- Running time: 3 1/2 hours
- Production companies: CBS Sports; OLN

Original release
- Network: CBS
- Release: 1980 – July 24, 1988
- Release: 2001 – July 25, 2010

Related
- Cycling on ABC; Cycling on NBC; CBS Sports Sunday

Cycling on CBS is the de facto name for broadcasts of multiple-stage bicycle races produced by CBS Sports, the sports division of the CBS television network. CBS was notably the first American television network to provide coverage of the Tour de France. CBS also provided coverage of Paris–Roubaix during the 1980s.

== Overview ==
=== Tour de France coverage ===
CBS first covered the Tour de France in 1980, airing approximately five minutes of action. During that time, CBS typically taped segments of the beginning of the stage in order to air them the following weekend on CBS Sports Sunday. The final stage would however, be broadcast live.

On April 7, 1985, CBS entered into an agreement with Broadcasting Rights International Corporation to retain the American television broadcasting rights to the Tour de France through 1988. The agreement was said to initially be worth approximately $50,000 with an additional $237,000 for the broadcasting rights to the 1987 tour. By 1986, CBS would devote to 3 1/2 hours of coverage for five consecutive weekends.

When CBS broadcast their final Tour de France in 1988, their coverage for the first three weekends consisted of highlights and features. Tim Brant and Phil Liggett served as hosts for the telecasts airing under the CBS Sports Sunday umbrella. CBS would however, air the final stage live on July 24.

In 2001, the Outdoor Life Network (or OLN) replaced ABC and ESPN as the principal American television broadcaster for the Tour de France. The network in the process, purchased air time on CBS, where three one-hour tape delayed specials would air on Sunday afternoons. These specials mainly recapped the past few days of action from the final three weeks of the tour. CBS however, devoted 3 1/2 hours to the final stage of the tour on CBS Sports Spectacular. In total, the arrangement with OLN and CBS was worth approximately $3.3 million.

CBS employed the services of commentators Armen Keteyian, Phil Liggett, and Paul Sherwen. In 2006, Bob Neumeier succeeded Armen Keteyian as the host. The following year, Craig Hummer succeeded Neumeier in the hosting role for CBS.

In 2008, Greg Amsinger hosted the Tour de France for CBS.

CBS' involvement with the Tour de France once again ended when NBC took over the American broadcast television network rights in 2011.

=== Tour of America ===
In 1983, CBS teamed with World Tour Cycling to devote at least 27 minutes to the Tour of America, which was a 130 km race from Williamsburg, Virginia to Richmond, Virginia.

=== Paris–Roubaix ===
CBS began covering Paris–Roubaix in 1984 and continued on through 1988, when the coverage like with the Tour de France moved over to ABC. Theo de Rooij, a Dutchman, had been in a promising position to win the 1985 race but had then crashed, losing his chance of winning. Covered in mud, he offered his thoughts on the race to John Tesh after the race:

"It's a bollocks, this race!” said de Rooij. "You're working like an animal, you don't have time to piss, you wet your pants. You're riding in mud like this, you're slipping ... it’s a pile of shit".

When then asked if he would start the race again, de Rooij replied:

"Sure, it's the most beautiful race in the world!”

=== Tour DuPont ===
In 1991, CBS succeeded NBC in providing broadcast network coverage of the Tour DuPont. While ESPN would provide daily, 30-minute long recaps each weeknight, CBS would provide their coverage on May 12 and May 19 as part of CBS Sports Sunday. The following year, CBS again provided two weeks worth of coverage, this time on May 10 and May 17 on 3 p.m. and 4:30 p.m. Eastern time respectively. Jim Gray anchored the broadcasts alongside Phil Liggett and James Brown. By 1994, when CBS Sports Sunday was now branded as Eye on Sports, CBS devoted at least two hours to the finale on May 15. James Brown once again helped anchor the coverage.

== Commentators ==
- Greg Amsinger
- Tim Brant
- James Brown
- John Dockery
- Jim Gray
- Eric Heiden
- Craig Hummer
- Armen Keteyian
- Bob Neumeier
- Phil Liggett
- Tim Ryan
- Paul Sherwen
- John Tesh

== See also ==
- Sports broadcasting contracts in the United States#Cycling
