= Musburger =

Musburger is a surname. Notable people with the surname include:

- Brent Musburger (born 1939), American sportscaster
- Todd Musburger, American attorney

== See also ==
- Meusburger
