= Cycling on ABC =

- Genre: Bicycle racing
- Directed by: Larry Kamm; Joel Feld
- Starring: John Eustice; Terry Gannon; Frank Gifford; Adrian Karsten; Jim Lampley; Phil Liggett; Diana Nyad; Sam Posey; Robin Roberts; Beth Ruyak; Pierre Salinger; Paul Sherwen; Al Trautwig
- Country of origin: United States
- Original language: English
- No. of seasons: 12

Production
- Executive producers: Roone Arledge; Jack O'Hara; Howard Katz
- Producers: Larry Kamm; Dennis Lewin; Amy Sacks; Jim Carr
- Production locations: France and other countries
- Camera setup: Multi-camera
- Running time: 90 minutes
- Production company: ABC Sports

Original release
- Network: ABC
- Release: July 1, 1989 – July 22, 2000

Related
- Wide World of Sports; Olympics on ABC; Cycling on ESPN

Cycling on ABC is the de facto name for broadcasts of bicycle races produced by ABC Sports, the sports division of the American Broadcasting Company television network.

== Overview ==
=== Race Across America ===
In 1982, Wide World of Sports devoted the April 17 and 23 editions to coverage of the Race Across America, which was then known as the Great American Bike Race. Jim Lampley anchored ABC's coverage of the inaugural race alongside Diana Nyad. ABC's coverage of the 1982 Great American Bicycle Race wound up garnering an Emmy for the Best Sports Documentary.

In total, ABC would cover the first five installments of the Race Across America. From 1983 to 1985, ABC aired the Race Across America in two one hour segments on Wide World of Sports. For their final year of covering the event (1986), ABC aired the Race Across America on Wide World of Sports as a single two-hour program.

=== Tour de France coverage ===
On July 26, 1976, Wide World or Sports provided coverage of the Tour de France for the very first time.

ABC later covered the Tour de France from 1989–2000, succeeding CBS in that capacity. ABC agreed to pay $1 million a year for the television rights to the Tour de France. ABC also carried Paris–Roubaix in this time frame under the Wide World of Sports umbrella.

In 1989, Sam Posey was brought in as part of the ABC Sports broadcast team covering the Tour de France. Many people were surprised by Posey's knowledge and genuine enthusiasm for the sport. ABC would bring him back as the lead anchor for the 1990 and 1991 races.

ABC's standard format for broadcasting the Tour de France consisted of a 12-minute report on behalf of Wide World of Sports on Saturdays and then, 1 1/2 hours worth of coverage the following afternoon. In total, ABC would present approximately eight same day telecasts. Four of them would be scheduled for broadcast on Wide World of Sports while the other four would be classified as special Sunday broadcasts.

ABC's coverage of the 1996 Tour de France was nominated for an Emmy for Outstanding Live Event Turnaround.

In 2001, ABC as well as their sister network, ESPN, would be supplanted by the Outdoor Life Network in broadcasting the Tour de France.

=== Summer Olympic coverage ===
At the 1984 Summer Olympics in Los Angeles, Al Michaels provided the play-by-play commentary for the road cycling events alongside Greg LeMond and Eric Heiden. For the track events, Bill Flemming had the play-by-play duties alongside Eric Heiden.

== Commentators ==
- John Eustice
- Terry Gannon
- Frank Gifford
- Adrian Karsten
- Jim Lampley
- Phil Liggett
- Brent Musburger
- Diana Nyad
- Sam Posey
- Robin Roberts
- Paul Sherwen
- Beth Ruyak
- Pierre Salinger
- Al Trautwig

== See also ==
- Sports broadcasting contracts in the United States § Cycling
- Cycling on ESPN
