= List of events at T-Mobile Arena =

T-Mobile Arena is a multipurpose indoor arena on the Las Vegas Strip in Paradise, Nevada. This is a list of past and upcoming events held at the arena.

Home games of the Vegas Golden Knights and Vegas Vanguards, regular tenants of the arena, are listed collectively and not individually.

== List ==
Musical events
Sports events
Other entertainment events

Date	Event	Notes
March 31, 2016	Martina McBride & Cam	Soft opening / dress rehearsal
April 6, 2016	The Killers, with Wayne Newton & Shamir	Opening night concert
April 7, 2016	Nicki Minaj, with Ariana Grande	
April 8–9, 2016; November 17, 2017	Guns N' Roses	Not in This Lifetime... Tour
April 19, 2016	Harlem Globetrotters	2016 World Tour
April 22, 2016 — December 3, 2022 (36 dates)	George Strait	Strait to Vegas
April 30, 2016	Billy Joel	Billy Joel in Concert
May 7, 2016	Canelo Álvarez vs. Amir Khan	
May 22, 2016	Billboard Music Awards	
June 5, 2016	Miss USA	
June 19, 2016	WWE Money in the Bank	
June 24–25, 2016; July 2–4, 2016	Garth Brooks, with Trisha Yearwood	Garth Brooks World Tour with Trisha Yearwood
July 9, 2016	UFC 200: Tate vs. Nunes	
July 16, 2016	Dixie Chicks	DCX MMXVI World Tour
July 22, 2016	Argentina vs. USA basketball	
August 6, 2016	Barbra Streisand	The Music... The Mem'ries... The Magic!
August 19, 2016	Gwen Stefani, with Eve	This Is What the Truth Feels Like Tour
August 20, 2016	UFC 202: Diaz vs. McGregor 2	
August 21, 2016	Slipknot & Marilyn Manson	The Hell Not Hallelujah Tour
September 1, 2016	Coldplay	A Head Full of Dreams Tour
September 11, 2016	Drake & Future	Summer Sixteen Tour
September 23–24, 2016	iHeartRadio Music Festival	
October 7, 2016	Dallas Stars vs. Los Angeles Kings	Frozen Fury
October 8, 2016	Colorado Avalanche vs. Los Angeles Kings	Frozen Fury
October 9, 2016	ASU vs. UNLV hockey	
October 13, 2016	Sacramento Kings vs. Los Angeles Lakers	
October 15, 2016	Golden State Warriors vs. Los Angeles Lakers	
October 21, 2016	Keith Urban	Ripcord World Tour
October 22, 2016	The Rolling Stones	
October 28, 2016	Five Finger Death Punch & Shinedown	
October 29, 2016	Kanye West	Saint Pablo Tour
November 2–6, 2016	Professional Bull Riders World Finals	
November 17, 2016	Latin Grammy Awards	
November 19, 2016	Sergey Kovalev vs. Andre Ward	
November 26, 2016	Carrie Underwood	Storyteller Tour: Stories in the Round
December 9, 2016	Maxwell & Mary J. Blige	King and Queen of Hearts World Tour
December 10, 2016	Duke vs. UNLV basketball	
December 17, 2016	CBS Sports Classic	College basketball doubleheader
December 19–21, 2016	Play 4Kay Shootout	Women's college basketball tournament
December 30, 2016	UFC 207: Nunes vs. Rousey	
January 18–22, 2017	Cirque du Soleil	Toruk: The First Flight
January 26, 2017	Calibash Las Vegas	Latin music festival
January 27, 2017	Joel Osteen	A Night of Hope
February 9, 2017	Harlem Globetrotters	2017 World Tour
February 13, 2017	WWE Monday Night Raw	
February 25, 2017; March 17, 2018	Bon Jovi	This House Is Not For Sale Tour
March 4, 2017	UFC 209: Woodley vs. Thompson 2	
March 8–11, 2017	Pac-12 men's basketball tournament	
April 2, 2017	Academy of Country Music Awards	
April 22, 2017	John Mayer	The Search for Everything World Tour
May 6, 2017	Canelo Álvarez vs. Julio César Chávez Jr.	
May 21, 2017	Billboard Music Awards	
May 28, 2017	New Kids on the Block, Boyz II Men & Paula Abdul	The Total Package Tour
June 16, 2017	Roger Waters	Us + Them Tour
June 21, 2017	NHL Awards & Expansion Draft	
June 24, 2017	Queen + Adam Lambert	2017–18 tour
June 30, 2017	Future	Nobody Safe Tour
July 1, 2017	Rammstein, Korn, Stone Sour	
July 3, 2017	Iron Maiden	The Book of Souls World Tour
July 7, 2017	The Ultimate Fighter 25 Finale	
July 8, 2017	UFC 213: Romero vs. Whittaker	
July 13, 2017	Tim McGraw & Faith Hill	Soul2Soul The World Tour 2017
July 15, 2017	Bruno Mars	24K Magic World Tour
July 21, 2017	Hall & Oates & Tears For Fears	
August 4, 2017	Ed Sheeran	÷ Tour
August 5, 2017	Kendrick Lamar	The Damn. Tour
August 11, 2017; December 16, 2017	Lady Gaga	Joanne World Tour
August 26, 2017	Floyd Mayweather Jr. vs. Conor McGregor	
September 15, 2017	Alejandro Fernández	
September 16, 2017	Canelo Álvarez vs. Gennady Golovkin	
September 22–23, 2017	iHeartRadio Music Festival	
September 26, 2017 – June 7, 2018 (54 dates)	2017–18 Vegas Golden Knights season	Culminating in the Stanley Cup Final
September 29, 2017	Imagine Dragons	Evolve Tour
September 30, 2017	Depeche Mode	Global Spirit Tour
October 6, 2017	UFC 216: Ferguson vs. Lee	
October 8, 2017	Sacramento Kings vs. Los Angeles Lakers	
October 14, 2017	The Weeknd	Starboy: Legend of the Fall Tour
October 28, 2017	Jay-Z	4:44 Tour
November 1–5, 2017	Professional Bull Riders World Finals	
November 20 & 22, 2017	MGM Resorts Main Event	
December 1, 2017	Vegas Strong Benefit Concert	Benefit for Las Vegas shooting victims
December 30, 2017	UFC 219: Cyborg vs. Holm	
January 5–6, 2018	Ice Vegas Invitational	College hockey tournament
January 20, 2018	Katy Perry	Witness: The Tour
January 27, 2018	Calibash Las Vegas	Latin music festival
February 16, 2018	Midland vs. UNLV hockey	
February 25, 2018	WWE Elimination Chamber	
March 3, 2018	UFC 222: Cyborg vs. Kunitskaya	
March 7–10, 2018	Pac-12 men's basketball tournament	
April 14–15, 2018; March 8, 2019	Justin Timberlake	Man of the Woods Tour
May 11–12, 2018	U2	Experience + Innocence Tour
May 26, 2018; April 12, 2019	Pink	Beautiful Trauma World Tour
July 7, 2018	UFC 226: Miocic vs. Cormier	
August 4, 2018	Chris Brown	Heartbreak on a Full Moon Tour
August 18, 2018	Panic! at the Disco	Pray for the Wicked Tour
September 2, 2018	Smashing Pumpkins	Shiny and Oh So Bright Tour
September 7, 2018	J. Cole	KOD Tour
September 8, 2018	Def Leppard & Journey	2018 tour
September 15, 2018	Canelo Álvarez vs. Gennady Golovkin II	
September 16, 2018 – April 21, 2019 (48 dates)	2018–19 Vegas Golden Knights season	
September 21–22, 2018	iHeartRadio Music Festival	
September 29, 2018	Wild 'N Out Live	
October 6, 2018	UFC 229: Khabib vs. McGregor	
October 10, 2018	Golden State Warriors vs. Los Angeles Lakers	
October 19, 2018	System of a Down	
November 7–11, 2018	Professional Bull Riders World Finals	
November 19 & 21, 2018	MGM Resorts Main Event	
November 26, 2018	Metallica	WorldWired Tour
November 30, 2018 November 16, 2019	Fleetwood Mac	2018–19 tour
December 11, 2018	WWE SmackDown Live	
December 15, 2018	Neon Hoops Showcase	College basketball doubleheader
December 30–31, 2018	Bruno Mars	24 Karat Magic New Year's
January 4–5, 2019	Ice Vegas Invitational	College hockey tournament
January 12, 2019	Disturbed	Evolution World Tour
January 25, 2019	Día Nacional de la Banda	Latin music festival
January 26, 2019	Calibash Las Vegas	Latin music festival
February 6, 2019	Travis Scott	Astroworld: Wish You Were Here Tour
February 15, 2019	Kiss	End of the Road Tour
March 2, 2019	UFC 235: Jones vs. Smith	
March 13–16, 2019	Pac-12 men's basketball tournament	
March 30, 2019; September 24, 2021	Michael Bublé	An Evening with Michael Bublé
April 20, 2019	Jordan Brand Classic	
May 4, 2019	Canelo Álvarez vs. Daniel Jacobs	
May 11, 2019	Ariana Grande	Sweetener World Tour
May 17, 2019	Florence and the Machine	High as Hope Tour
June 15, 2019	Jennifer Lopez	It's My Party Tour
June 22, 2019	Hootie & the Blowfish	Group Therapy Tour
June 28–29, 2019	Paul McCartney	Freshen Up Tour
July 6, 2019	UFC 239: Jones vs. Santos	
August 5, 2019	Washington Mystics vs. Las Vegas Aces	
August 9, 2019	USA basketball scrimmage	
September 6–7, 2019	Elton John	Farewell Yellow Brick Road
September 13, 2019	Eric Clapton	
September 14, 2019	Tyson Fury vs. Otto Wallin	
September 15, 2019 – March 3, 2020 (41 dates)	2019–20 Vegas Golden Knights season	Suspended due to COVID-19 pandemic
September 20–21, 2019	iHeartRadio Music Festival	
October 11, 2019	WWE SmackDown Live	Featured the 2019 WWE draft
October 18, 2019	Lynyrd Skynyrd	Last of the Street Survivors Farewell Tour
October 19, 2019	Phil Collins	Still Not Dead Yet, Live
November 6–10, 2019	Professional Bull Riders World Finals	
November 24 & 26, 2019	MGM Resorts Main Event	
December 14, 2019	UFC 245: Usman vs. Covington	
December 18, 2019	Kentucky vs. Utah basketball	Neon Hoops Showcase
December 21, 2019	CBS Sports Classic	College basketball doubleheader
January 3–4, 2020	Fortress Invitational	College hockey tournament
January 17, 2020	Tool	
January 18, 2020	UFC 246: McGregor vs. Cowboy	
January 24, 2020	Día Nacional de la Banda	Latin music festival
January 25, 2020	Calibash Las Vegas	Latin music festival
March 7, 2020	UFC 248: Adesanya vs. Romero	
March 11, 2020	Pac-12 men's basketball tournament	Suspended due to COVID-19 pandemic
November 25, 2020	Washington vs. San Diego State women's basketball	
November 28 – December 1, 2020	Men's Vegas Bubble	
January 14 – June 22, 2021 (38 dates)	2020–21 Vegas Golden Knights season	
March 10–13, 2021	Pac-12 men's basketball tournament	
May 8, 2021	San Jose Barracuda vs. Henderson Silver Knights	
July 10, 2021	UFC 264: Poirier vs. McGregor 3	
August 21, 2021	Manny Pacquiao vs. Yordenis Ugás	
September 17–18, 2021	iHeartRadio Music Festival	
September 25, 2021	UFC 266: Volkanovski vs. Ortega	
September 26, 2021 – April 24, 2022 (45 dates)	2021–22 Vegas Golden Knights season	
October 2, 2021	Alanis Morissette	Jagged Little Pill Tour
October 9, 2021	Tyson Fury vs. Deontay Wilder III	
November 3–7, 2021	Professional Bull Riders World Finals	
November 19 & 21, 2021	Roman Main Event	
November 22–23, 2021	Empire Classic	
November 26, 2021	Duke vs. Gonzaga basketball	
December 11, 2021	UFC 269: Oliveira vs. Poirier	
December 15, 2021	Luke Combs	What You See Is What You Get Tour
December 18, 2021	CBS Sports Classic	
December 19, 2021	Pac-12 Coast-to-Coast Challenge	
January 22, 2022	Tool	Fear Inoculum Tour
February 4–5, 2022	NHL All-Star Weekend	
February 6, 2022	Kane Brown	Blessed & Free Tour
March 5, 2022	UFC 272: Covington vs. Masvidal	
March 9–12, 2022	Pac-12 men's basketball tournament	
March 18, 2022	André Rieu and His Johann Strauss Orchestra	
March 25, 2022	Dua Lipa	Future Nostalgia Tour
March 31, 2022	Hillsong United & Chris Tomlin	Tomlin United Tour
April 1, 2022	Billie Eilish	Happier Than Ever: The World Tour
April 23, 2022	Ricardo Arjona	Blanco y Negro Tour
May 7, 2022	Canelo Álvarez vs. Dmitry Bivol	
May 13, 2022	Eric Church	The Gather Again Tour
May 29, 2022	AEW Double or Nothing	
June 30, 2022	UFC Hall of Fame Induction Ceremony	
July 2, 2022	UFC 276: Adesanya vs. Cannonier	
July 15, 2022	Machine Gun Kelly	Mainstream Sellout Tour
July 30, 2022	James Taylor	
August 6, 2022; August 20, 2022	Daddy Yankee	La Última Vuelta World Tour
August 26, 2022	The Killers	Imploding the Mirage Tour
August 27, 2022	Chris Brown & Lil Baby	One of Them Ones Tour
September 2, 2022	Swedish House Mafia	Paradise Again World Tour
September 9, 2022	Kendrick Lamar	The Big Steppers Tour
September 10, 2022	UFC 279: Diaz vs. Ferguson	
September 17, 2022	Canelo Álvarez vs. Gennady Golovkin III	
September 23–24, 2022	iHeartRadio Music Festival	
September 26, 2022 – June 13, 2023 (58 dates)	2022–23 Vegas Golden Knights season	Culminating in the Stanley Cup Final
October 1, 2022	Roger Waters	This Is Not a Drill
October 5, 2022	Phoenix Suns vs. Los Angeles Lakers	
October 6, 2022	Minnesota Timberwolves vs. Los Angeles Lakers	
October 7, 2022	My Chemical Romance	Comeback tour
October 14, 2022	Karol G	Strip Love Tour
October 21, 2022	Panic! at the Disco	Viva Las Vengeance Tour
October 26, 2022	Elevation Worship & Steven Furtick	Elevation Nights Tour
October 29, 2022	U.S. Hockey Hall of Fame Game	North Dakota vs. Arizona State hockey
November 4–6, 2022	PBR Team Series Championship	
November 11, 2022	Post Malone	Twelve Carat Tour
November 18 & 20, 2022	Continental Tire Main Event	
November 19, 2022	Jo Koy	Funny Is Funny World Tour
December 10, 2022	UFC 282: Błachowicz vs. Ankalaev	
December 19, 2022	Rod Wave	Beautiful Mind Tour
January 27, 2023	Día Nacional de la Banda	Latin music festival
March 4, 2023	UFC 285: Jones vs. Gane	
March 8–11, 2023	Pac-12 men's basketball tournament	
March 17, 2023	Calibash Las Vegas	Latin music festival
March 23–25, 2023	NCAA Men's Basketball Tournament West Regional	
March 30, 2023; December 1, 2023	Depeche Mode	Memento Mori World Tour
April 7, 2023	New Edition	Legacy Tour
April 8, 2023	Muse	Will of the People World Tour
April 22, 2023	Gervonta Davis vs. Ryan Garcia	
May 28, 2023	AEW Double or Nothing	
July 8, 2023	UFC 290: Volkanovski vs. Rodríguez	
July 12, 2023	Bert Kreischer's Fully Loaded Comedy Festival	
July 15, 2023	Nickelback	Get Rollin' Tour
July 29, 2023	Errol Spence Jr. vs. Terence Crawford	
August 7, 2023	Puerto Rico vs. USA basketball	
August 12, 2023	Greta Van Fleet	Starcatcher World Tour
August 19, 2023	Zach Bryan	The Burn, Burn, Burn Tour
August 26, 2023	Duran Duran	Future Past Tour
September 1–2, 2023	Drake	It's All a Blur Tour
September 10, 2023	Phoenix Mercury vs. Las Vegas Aces	
September 13, 2023	Chicago Sky vs. Las Vegas Aces	
September 14, 2023	Carín León	Colmillo de Leche Tour
September 15, 2023	Marco Antonio Solís	El Buki World Tour 2023
September 16, 2023	UFC Fight Night: Grasso vs. Shevchenko 2	
September 17, 2023	Maná	México Lindo y Querido Tour
September 22–23, 2023	iHeartRadio Music Festival	
September 30, 2023	Canelo Álvarez vs. Jermell Charlo	
October 9, 2023	Brooklyn Nets vs. Los Angeles Lakers	
October 13, 2023	Romeo Santos	Formula Vol. 3 Tour
October 20–22, 2023	PBR Team Series Championship	
October 28, 2023	SZA	S.O.S. Tour
November 3, 2023	Doja Cat	The Scarlet Tour
November 6, 2023	Hall of Fame Series	College basketball series
November 17 & 19, 2023	Continental Tire Main Event	
November 24, 2023	Enrique Iglesias, Pitbull, Ricky Martin	The Trilogy Tour
December 7 & 9, 2023	NBA In-Season Tournament semi-finals & finals	
December 16, 2023	UFC 296: Edwards vs. Covington	
December 23, 2023	Arizona vs. Florida Atlantic basketball	Desert Classic
January 26, 2024	Día Nacional de la Banda	Latin music festival
February 8, 2024	WrestleMania XL Kickoff	
February 18, 2024	Tool	
February 23–24, 2024	Bad Bunny	Most Wanted Tour
March 1–2, 2024	Madonna	The Celebration Tour
March 8, 2024	Nicki Minaj	Pink Friday 2 World Tour
March 13–16, 2024	Pac-12 men's basketball tournament	
March 22, 2024	Bruce Springsteen	2024 World Tour
March 30, 2024	Tim Tszyu vs. Sebastian Fundora	
April 13, 2024	UFC 300: Pereira vs. Hill	
April 19, 2024	Luis Miguel	Luis Miguel Tour 2024
May 4, 2024	Canelo Álvarez vs. Jaime Munguia	
May 10, 2024	Justin Timberlake	The Forget Tomorrow World Tour
May 18, 2024	Kane Brown	In The Air Tour
June 7–8, 2024	Zach Bryan	The Quittin Time Tour
June 27, 2024	UFC Hall of Fame Induction Ceremony	
June 29, 2024	UFC 303: Pereira vs. Procházka 2	
July 2, 2024	Indiana Fever vs. Las Vegas Aces	
July 3, 2024	Blink-182	One More Time Tour
July 10, 2024	USA vs. Canada basketball	
July 20, 2024	Jennifer Lopez	This Is Me... Live
August 15–18, 2024	Abu Dhabi Combat Club	
September 3, 2024	Chicago Sky vs. Las Vegas Aces	
September 20–21, 2024	iHeartRadio Music Festival	
October 15, 2024	Golden State Warriors vs. Los Angeles Lakers	
October 18–20, 2024	PBR Team Series Championship	
November 4, 2024	Hall of Fame Series	College basketball doubleheader
November 15–16, 2024	Usher	Usher: Past Present Future
November 26, 2024	Vegas Showdown	College basketball doubleheader
December 7, 2024	UFC 310: Pantoja vs. Asakura	
December 14 & 17, 2024	Emirates NBA Cup semi-finals & finals	
February 1, 2025	David Benavidez vs. David Morrell	
March 8, 2025	UFC 313: Pereira vs. Ankalaev	
April 5–6, 2025	College Basketball Crown semi-finals & finals	
April 18, 2025	WWE SmackDown Live	
April 19, 2025	NXT Stand & Deliver	
April 21, 2025	WWE Monday Night Raw	
May 4, 2025	Naoya Inoue vs. Ramon Cardenas	
June 22, 2025	Indiana Fever vs. Las Vegas Aces	
June 28, 2025	UFC 317: Topuria vs. Oliveira	
July 16, 18 & 19, 2025	Lady Gaga	The Mayhem Ball
September 4, 2025	Minnesota Lynx vs. Las Vegas Aces	
September 7 & 9, 2025	Chicago Sky vs. Las Vegas Aces	
September 19–20, 2025	iHeartRadio Music Festival	
October 4, 2025	UFC 320: Ankalaev vs. Pereira 2	
October 5, 2025	Hozier	Unreal Unearth: Unending Tour
October 15, 2025	Dallas Mavericks vs. Los Angeles Lakers	
October 24–26, 2025	PBR Team Series Championship	
November 3, 2025	Hall of Fame Series	College basketball doubleheader
December 6, 2025	UFC 323: Dvalishvili vs. Yan 2	
December 13 & 16, 2025	2025 NBA Cup semi-finals & final	
January 24, 2026	UFC 324: Gaethje vs. Pimblett	
February 21, 2026	Mario Barrios vs. Ryan Garcia	
March 1, 2026	MGM Slam	Professional tennis tournament
March 7, 2026	UFC 326: Holloway vs. Oliveira 2	
April 4–5, 2026	College Basketball Crown semi-finals & finals	
April 9 & 11, 2026	NCAA Frozen Four	
May 2, 2026	David Benavidez vs. Gilberto Ramirez	
July 3, 2026	Chicago Sky vs. Las Vegas Aces	
July 5, 2026	Indiana Fever vs. Las Vegas Aces	
July 11, 2026	UFC 329: McGregor vs. Holloway 2	
August 29–30, 2026	Players Era Volleyball Showcase	Women's college volleyball series
September 18–19, 2026	iHeartRadio Music Festival	
October 13, 2026	Golden State Warriors vs. Los Angeles Lakers	
November 2, 2026	Hall of Fame Series Las Vegas	College basketball series
November 6–8, 2026	PBR Team Series Championship	
November 24–27, 2026	Players Era 16 Men's Tournament	Men's college basketball tournament
November 25, 2026	Duke vs. UConn basketball	
December 6, 2026–April 7, 2027 (12 dates)	2026–27 Vegas Vanguards season	
December 12, 2026	UFC 335: Oliveira vs. Lopes	
February 6–7, 2027	The Escapement	Horology convention
March 26–29, 2027	NCAA Men's Basketball Tournament Midwest Regional	
