= Cycling on ESPN =

- Genre: Multiple-stage bicycle racing
- Starring: See commentators section
- No. of seasons: 12

Production
- Production locations: France and other countries
- Camera setup: Multi-camera
- Running time: 1 1/2 hours
- Production company: ESPN Inc.

Original release
- Network: ESPN; ESPN2
- Release: 1988 – July 24, 2000

Related
- Cycling on ABC

Cycling on ESPN is the de facto name for broadcasts of multiple-stage bicycle races airing on the ESPN cable television network.

== Overview ==
ESPN was the exclusive American cable television outlet for the annual Tour de France event from 1992-2000. ESPN also broadcast the Tour DuPont race throughout the entirety of its existence from 1989 to 1996. ESPN also provided coverage of the 1988 Coors International Bicycle Classic, the 1989 World Professional Cycling Championships from Chambéry, France, the 1990 US Pro Cycling Championships in Philadelphia, and the 1996 U.S. Olympic Cycling Team Trials.

=== Tour de France coverage ===
From 1989 to 1991, ESPN only provided three one-hour long highlight specials for each race. Meanwhile, ESPN's sister network, ABC had only provided coverage that recapped the previous week's action on their Saturday afternoon anthology series, Wide World of Sports also since 1989. Come 1992, ESPN announced that they would devote at least 16 hours to covering the Tour the France. All in all, it would be the most comprehensive coverage that an American television network devoted to the Tour de France up until that time.

ESPN would air each stage on a same-day delay during the afternoon for the next 22 days. Instead of producing the broadcasts themselves from the ground up, ESPN relied on France's world feed.

In 2001, ESPN and ABC would be supplanted by the Outdoor Life Network in broadcasting the Tour de France.

== Commentators ==
- David Chauner
- Brian Drebber
- Adrian Karsten - Karsten was known in the cycling community for his 'side-line' style reporting while anchoring during ESPN's broadcasts of the Tour de France. Karsten hosted the Tour de France from 1994 through 2000—more than any other American host.
- Phil Liggett
- Lon McEachern
- Al Meltzer
- Peter Rogot
- Paul Sherwen
- Barry Tompkins

== See also ==
- Sports broadcasting contracts in the United States#Cycling
- Cycling on ABC
