= 2025 PBR Camping World Team Series season =

- League: PBR Team Series
- Sport: Bull riding
- Duration: July 11 – October 26, 2025
- Games: 175
- Teams: 10

2025 PBR Teams New Rider Draft
- Top draft pick: Jhon Carlos Moreira
- Picked by: Arizona Ridge Riders

Regular season
- Season champions: Florida Freedom
- Runners-up: Austin Gamblers
- Season MVP: John Crimber (Florida Freedom)

PBR Teams Championship
- Venue: T-Mobile Arena
- Champions: Carolina Cowboys
- Runners-up: Missouri Thunder
- Championship MVP: Clay Guiton (Carolina Cowboys)

PBR Team Series seasons
- ← 2024 2026 →

The 2025 PBR Camping World Team Series season was the fourth season of the PBR Team Series. The season began on July 11 and concluded on October 26 at T-Mobile Arena during the PBR Team Series Championship. This was also the third and final season in which the PBR Team Series had Camping World as its title sponsor.

== Draft ==
The 2025 PBR Teams New Rider Draft took place on May 20 in Austin City Limits Live at The Moody Theater in Austin, Texas.

Rnd.	No.	Team	Rider
1	1	Arizona Ridge Riders	Jhon Carlos Moreira
1	2	New York Mavericks	Trey Holston
1	3	Texas Rattlers	Macaulie Leather
1	4	Kansas City Outlaws	Daniel Feitosa
1	5	Missouri Thunder	Boston Leather
1	6	Kansas City Outlaws	Eric Novoa
1	7	Florida Freedom	Cannon Cravens
1	8	Austin Gamblers	Rogerio Venancio
1	9	Kansas City Outlaws	William Peao Rondonia
1	10	Oklahoma Wildcatters	Thomas Triplett
2	11	Arizona Ridge Riders	Riquelme dos Santos
2	12	Carolina Cowboys	Alisson de Souza
2	13	Oklahoma Wildcatters	Hudson Frey
2	14	Nashville Stampede	Damiao dos Santos
2	15	Carolina Cowboys	Gabriel Henrique da Silva
2	16	Oklahoma Wildcatters	Brody Robinson
2	17	Florida Freedom	Douglas da Silva
2	18	Austin Gamblers	Vinicius Pinheiro Correa
2	19	Kansas City Outlaws	Natanael Serra Aires
2	20	Carolina Cowboys	Ramon Fiorini de Souza
3	21	Arizona Ridge Riders	Elzisclay dos Santos
3	22	New York Mavericks	Ayden Dale
3	23	Oklahoma Wildcatters	Jack Brodrick
3	24	Nashville Stampede	Pablo Soares
3	25	Missouri Thunder	—
3	26	Texas Rattlers	—
3	27	Florida Freedom	Alison dos Santos
3	28	Austin Gamblers	—
3	29	Kansas City Outlaws	—
3	30	Carolina Cowboys	—

== Schedule ==
No.	Event	Date	Venue	Location
1	PBR Wildcatter Days	July 11–13	Paycom Center	Oklahoma City, Oklahoma
2	PBR Teams Duluth	July 26–27	Gas South Arena	Duluth, Georgia
3	PBR Freedom Days	August 8–10	Amerant Bank Arena	Sunrise, Florida
4	PBR Stampede Days	August 15–17	Bridgestone Arena	Nashville, Tennessee
5	PBR Gambler Days	August 22–24	Moody Center	Austin, Texas
6	PBR Thunder Days	August 29–31	Great Southern Bank Arena	Springfield, Missouri
7	PBR Teams Anaheim	September 5–7	Honda Center	Anaheim, California
8	PBR Cowboy Days	September 12–14	First Horizon Coliseum	Greensboro, North Carolina
9	PBR Maverick Days	September 18–20	UBS Arena	Elmont, New York
10	PBR Rattler Days	September 26–28	Dickies Arena	Fort Worth, Texas
11	PBR Outlaw Days	October 3–5	T-Mobile Center	Kansas City, Missouri
12	PBR Ridge Rider Days	October 10–12	Desert Diamond Arena	Glendale, Arizona
13	PBR Teams Championship	October 24–26	T-Mobile Arena	Las Vegas, Nevada

== Regular season standings ==
Pos.	Team	W	L	Pct.	Behind	Score	Rides	Outs	Pct.	Winnings
1	Florida Freedom	25	10	.714	—	8375.50	97	175	55.4%	$708,925
2	Austin Gamblers	24	11	.686	1.0	7728.75	90	175	51.4%	$630,200
3	Texas Rattlers	23	12	.657	2.0	6433.25	74	175	42.3%	$591,150
4	Arizona Ridge Riders	22	13	.629	3.0	6998.75	82	175	46.9%	$488,400
5	Carolina Cowboys	19	16	.543	6.0	6175.00	72	175	41.1%	$461,175
6	Nashville Stampede	15	20	.429	10.0	5671.75	66	175	37.7%	$388,975
7	Missouri Thunder	15	20	.429	10.0	5082.50	59	175	33.7%	$392,975
8	Kansas City Outlaws	11	24	.314	14.0	5318.00	62	175	35.4%	$372,750
9	Oklahoma Wildcatters	11	24	.314	14.0	5304.00	62	175	35.4%	$332,475
10	New York Mavericks	9	26	.257	16.0	5263.75	61	175	34.9%	$353,550

== Championship ==
=== Podium ===
Result	Team	Record
1st place, gold medalist(s)	Carolina Cowboys	4–0
2nd place, silver medalist(s)	Missouri Thunder	3–2
3rd place, bronze medalist(s)	Texas Rattlers	2–2
4	Arizona Ridge Riders	2–2
5	Florida Freedom	0–2
5	Austin Gamblers	0–2
7	New York Mavericks	1–1
7	Nashville Stampede	0–2
9	Kansas City Outlaws	0–1
9	Oklahoma Wildcatters	0–1

=== Results ===
==== Day 1 ====
Play-In Game: No. 8 Kansas City Outlaws vs. No. 9 Oklahoma Wildcatters vs. No. 10 New York Mavericks – Game summary

Rider	1	2	3	4	5	Total
No. 8 Kansas City	87.75	0.00	85.75	0.00	0.00	173.50
No. 9 Oklahoma	88.50	0.00	0.00	85.50	86.25^{†}	260.25
No. 10 New York	86.50	86.75	88.50	0.00	88.50	350.25

at T-Mobile Arena, Las Vegas, Nevada

- Date: October 24, 2025
- Game time: 7:45 p.m. PST
- Game weather: None (indoor arena)
- TV announcers (Fox Nation): Craig Hummer (play-by-play), Cord McCoy (on the dirt), Kate Harrison (sideline), Matt West (sideline)
- Result

Game information

Results

- NY – Bob Mitchell rode Sizmagraf for 86.50 points.
- OK – Eduardo Matos rode Wicked Solo for 88.50 points.
- KC – Koltin Hevalow rode Buck for 87.75 points.
- NY – Leonardo Castro rode Milestone for 86.75 points.
- OK – Wingson Henrique da Silva was bucked off by Real Deal in 6.37 seconds.
- KC – Eric Henrique Domingos was bucked off by Tchoupitoulas in 6.84 seconds.
- NY – Mauricio Gulla Moreira rode Stryker for 88.50 points.
- OK – Josh Frost was bucked off by Murrell in 4.65 seconds.
- KC – Sandro Batista rode Velvet Revolver for 85.75 points.
- NY – Julio Cesar Marques was bucked off by Torched in 2.65 seconds.
- OK – Guilherme Valleiras rode Yo Mamma for 85.50 points.
- KC – Pablo Soares was bucked off by BRUNT Haymaker in 4.62 seconds.
- NY – Hudson Bolton rode Black Harbor for 88.50 points.
- OK – Kase Hitt was awarded a re-ride after riding Magic Potion.
- KC – Cassio Dias was bucked off by Boot Barn's Skunk Kitty in 5.42 seconds.

Re-rides

- OK – Kase Hitt rode Buffalo Heifer for 86.25 points.

Top scores

- NY – Mauricio Gulla Moreira, Hudson Bolton (88.50)
- OK – Eduardo Matos (88.50)
- KC – Koltin Hevalow (87.75)

Top bull scores

- Wicked Solo (43.25)
- Tchoupitoulas (43.25)
- BRUNT Haymaker (43.25)

Round 1: No. 7 Missouri Thunder vs. No. 4 Arizona Ridge Riders – Game summary

Rider	1	2	3	4	5	Total
No. 7 Missouri	88.75	0.00	0.00	87.50^{†}	0.00	176.25
No. 4 Arizona	86.00	86.75	0.00	82.25	0.00	255.00

at T-Mobile Arena, Las Vegas, Nevada

- Date: October 24, 2025
- Game time: 7:45 p.m. PST
- Game weather: None (indoor arena)
- TV announcers (Fox Nation): Craig Hummer (play-by-play), Cord McCoy (on the dirt), Kate Harrison (sideline), Matt West (sideline)
- Result

Game information

Results

- MISS –
- ARI –

Re-rides

Top scores

- MISS –
- ARI –

Top bull scores

Round 1: No. 6 Nashville Stampede vs. No. 5 Carolina Cowboys – Game summary

Rider	1	2	3	4	5	Total
No. 6 Nashville	86.25	87.50	0.00	0.00	87.25	261.00
No. 5 Carolina	85.75	85.75	83.75	90.25	87.75	433.25

at T-Mobile Arena, Las Vegas, Nevada

- Date: October 24, 2025
- Game time: 7:45 p.m. PST
- Game weather: None (indoor arena)
- TV announcers (Fox Nation): Craig Hummer (play-by-play), Cord McCoy (on the dirt), Kate Harrison (sideline), Matt West (sideline)
- Result

Game information

Results

- NASH –
- CAR –

Re-rides

Top scores

- NASH –
- CAR –

Top bull scores

Last Chance Game: No. 7 Missouri Thunder vs. No. 6 Nashville Stampede vs. No. 10 New York Mavericks – Game summary

Rider	1	2	3	4	5	Total
No. 7 Missouri	0.00	90.75	0.00	0.00	0.00	90.75
No. 6 Nashville	0.00	89.75	0.00	0.00	0.00	89.75
No. 10 New York	0.00	0.00	0.00	0.00	0.00	0.00

at T-Mobile Arena, Las Vegas, Nevada

- Date: October 24, 2025
- Game time: 7:45 p.m. PST
- Game weather: None (indoor arena)
- TV announcers (Fox Nation): Craig Hummer (play-by-play), Cord McCoy (on the dirt), Kate Harrison (sideline), Matt West (sideline)
- Result

Game information

Results

- MISS –
- NASH –
- NY –

Re-rides

Top scores

- MISS –
- NASH –
- NY – None

Top bull scores

==== Day 2 ====
Quarterfinals: No. 4 Arizona Ridge Riders vs. No. 3 Texas Rattlers – Game summary

Rider	1	2	3	4	5	Total
No. 4 Arizona	86.00	86.00	0.00	84.25	74.50	330.75
No. 3 Texas	0.00	86.25	0.00	88.25	87.00^{†}	261.50

at T-Mobile Arena, Las Vegas, Nevada

- Date: October 25, 2025
- Game time: 7:15 p.m. PST
- Game weather: None (indoor arena)
- TV announcers (Fox Nation): Craig Hummer (play-by-play), Cord McCoy (on the dirt), Kate Harrison (sideline), Matt West (sideline)
- Result

Game information

Results

- ARI –
- TEX –

Re-rides

Top scores

- ARI –
- TEX –

Top bull scores

Quarterfinals: No. 5 Carolina Cowboys vs. No. 2 Austin Gamblers – Game summary

Rider	1	2	3	4	5	Total
No. 5 Carolina	0.00	0.00	87.50	83.75	87.50	258.75
No. 2 Austin	0.00	0.00	0.00	86.50	0.00	86.50

at T-Mobile Arena, Las Vegas, Nevada

- Date: October 25, 2025
- Game time: 7:15 p.m. PST
- Game weather: None (indoor arena)
- TV announcers (Fox Nation): Craig Hummer (play-by-play), Cord McCoy (on the dirt), Kate Harrison (sideline), Matt West (sideline)
- Result

Game information

Results

- CAR –
- AUS –

Re-rides

Top scores

- CAR –
- AUS –

Top bull scores

Quarterfinals: No. 7 Missouri Thunder vs. No. 1 Florida Freedom – Game summary

Rider	1	2	3	4	5	Total
No. 7 Missouri	86.75	85.25	89.00	88.25	0.00^{††}	349.25
No. 1 Florida	89.50	0.00	87.25	0.00	92.00	268.75

at T-Mobile Arena, Las Vegas, Nevada

- Date: October 25, 2025
- Game time: 7:15 p.m. PST
- Game weather: None (indoor arena)
- TV announcers (Fox Nation): Craig Hummer (play-by-play), Cord McCoy (on the dirt), Kate Harrison (sideline), Matt West (sideline)
- Result

Game information

Results

- MISS –
- FL –

Re-rides

Top scores

- MISS –
- FL –

Top bull scores

Last Chance Game: No. 3 Texas Rattlers vs. No. 2 Austin Gamblers vs. No. 1 Florida Freedom – Game summary

Rider	1	2	3	4	5	Total
No. 3 Texas	87.25	90.00	0.00	88.50	0.00	265.75
No. 2 Austin	0.00	89.00	0.00	DQ^{†}	0.00	89.00
No. 1 Florida	0.00	88.75	0.00	DQ^{†}	0.00	88.75

at T-Mobile Arena, Las Vegas, Nevada

- Date: October 25, 2025
- Game time: 7:15 p.m. PST
- Game weather: None (indoor arena)
- TV announcers (Fox Nation): Craig Hummer (play-by-play), Cord McCoy (on the dirt), Kate Harrison (sideline), Matt West (sideline)
- Result

Game information

Results

- TEX –
- AUS –
- FL –

Re-rides

Top scores

- TEX –
- AUS –
- FL –

Top bull scores

==== Day 3 ====
Semifinals: No. 7 Missouri Thunder vs. No. 3 Texas Rattlers – Game summary

Rider	1	2	3	4	5	Total
No. 7 Missouri	0.00	88.75	86.50	87.25	87.50	350.00
No. 3 Texas	89.50	87.75	87.25	83.50	0.00	348.00

at T-Mobile Arena, Las Vegas, Nevada

- Date: October 26, 2025
- Game time: 1:45p.m. PST
- Game weather: None (indoor arena)
- TV announcers (Fox Nation): Craig Hummer (play-by-play), Cord McCoy (on the dirt), Kate Harrison (sideline), Matt West (sideline)
- Result

Game information

Results

- MIS –
- TEX –

Re-rides

Top scores

- MIS –
- TEX –

Top bull scores

Semifinals: No. 5 Carolina Cowboys vs. No. 4 Arizona Ridge Riders – Game summary

Rider	1	2	3	4	5	6	Total
No. 5 Carolina	87.25	0.00	87.50	0.00	0.00	88.00	262.75
No. 4 Arizona	86.50	0.00	0.00	0.00	88.25	0.00^{†}	174.75

at T-Mobile Arena, Las Vegas, Nevada

- Date: October 26, 2025
- Game time: 1:45p.m. PST
- Game weather: None (indoor arena)
- TV announcers (Fox Nation): Craig Hummer (play-by-play), Cord McCoy (on the dirt), Kate Harrison (sideline), Matt West (sideline)
- Result

Game information

Results

- CAR –
- ARI –

Re-rides

Top scores

- CAR –
- ARI –

Top bull scores

Third Place Game: No. 4 Arizona Ridge Riders vs. No. 3 Texas Rattlers – Game summary

Rider	1	2	3	4	5	Total
No. 4 Arizona	57.00	88.25^{†}	0.00	0.00	DQ	350.00
No. 3 Texas	88.25	DQ^{†}	85.50	87.75	DQ	348.00

at T-Mobile Arena, Las Vegas, Nevada

- Date: October 26, 2025
- Game time: 1:45p.m. PST
- Game weather: None (indoor arena)
- TV announcers (Fox Nation): Craig Hummer (play-by-play), Cord McCoy (on the dirt), Kate Harrison (sideline), Matt West (sideline)
- Result

Game information

Results

- ARI –
- TEX –

Re-rides

Top scores

- ARI –
- TEX –

Top bull scores

2025 PBR Camping World Team Series Championship: No. 7 Missouri Thunder vs. No. 5 Carolina Cowboys– Game summary

Rider	1	2	3	4	Total
No. 7 Missouri	87.00^{†}	0.00^{†}	0.00	0.00	177.75
No. 5 Carolina	68.25	87.50	86.75	0.00	242.50

at T-Mobile Arena, Las Vegas, Nevada

- Date: October 26, 2025
- Game time: 1:45p.m. PST
- Game weather: None (indoor arena)
- TV announcers (Fox Nation): Craig Hummer (play-by-play), Cord McCoy (on the dirt), Kate Harrison (sideline), Matt West (sideline)
- Result

Game information

Results

- MIS –
- CAR –

Re-rides

Top scores

- MIS –
- CAR –

Top bull scores

== MVP standings ==
PBR Teams Regular Season MVP Standings
Pos.	Rider	Team	Rides	Outs	Pct.	Agg. Score	Behind
1	(United States) John Crimber	Florida Freedom	25	34	73.53%	2186.25	—
2	(Australia) Brady Fielder	Texas Rattlers	24	32	75.00%	2102.25	84.00
3	(Brazil) Thiago Salgado	Florida Freedom	24	35	68.57%	2091.50	94.75

PBR Teams Championship MVP Standings
Pos.	Rider	Team	Rides	Outs	Pct.	Agg. Score	Behind
1	(United States) Clay Guiton	Carolina Cowboys	5	5	100.00%	433.50	—
2	(Brazil) Paulo Eduardo Rossetto	Missouri Thunder	4	5	80.00%	353.25	80.25
3	(Brazil) Everton Natan da Silva	Arizona Ridge Riders	4	4	100.00%	315.50	118.00
