= Cord McCoy =

American rodeo cowboy

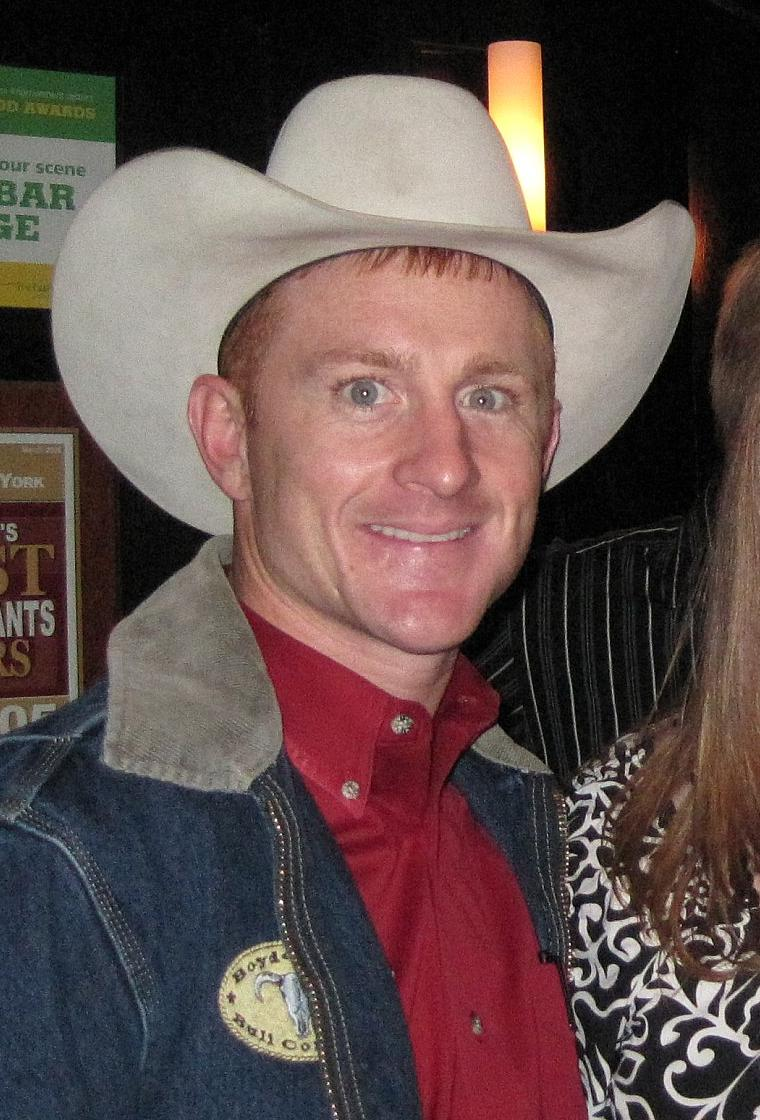
- Born: August 19, 1980 (age 46); Durant, Oklahoma, U.S.
- Education: Southwestern Oklahoma State University
- Occupation: Rodeo
- Television: The Amazing Race 16 (2nd place); The Amazing Race 18 (6th place); The Amazing Race 24 (5th place)
- Website: Official website

Cord Jarret McCoy (born August 19, 1980) is an American professional rodeo stock contractor and producer and former professional rodeo cowboy who specialized in saddle bronc riding and bull riding. He is the co-owner of McCoy Rodeo. He is best known as the 2nd-place finisher (along with his brother Jet McCoy) on The Amazing Race 16. Jet and Cord returned to compete in the eighteenth season of The Amazing Race, finishing in 6th place. Jet and Cord returned for The Amazing Race 24 also known as "The Amazing Race All-Stars" finishing in 5th place. In 2022 and 2023, Cord was the head coach of the Oklahoma Freedom in the Professional Bull Riders (PBR) Team Series.

== Background ==
McCoy was born in Durant, Oklahoma, to parents Denny McCoy, a rancher and horse trader, and Janet McCoy, a professional photographer. Cord grew up as a cowboy in the small town of Tupelo, Oklahoma.

He participated in his first rodeo competition in 1985 at age 5, after becoming interested in rodeo from his family. He was the catcher on his high school baseball team and qualified for the state tournament. He was a member of the Oklahoma high school team that won a national rodeo title and was a member of the Southwestern Oklahoma State rodeo team that finished second in the nation in 2000. He graduated from Tupelo High School with 13 other people. He attended Southwestern Oklahoma State University in Weatherford, Oklahoma, and achieved a bachelor's degree in Business Administration.

== Professional career ==
McCoy joined the Professional Rodeo Cowboys Association (PRCA) in 2001. In 2002, he qualified for the PRCA Prairie Circuit Finals Rodeo in bareback bronc riding, saddle bronc riding and bull riding. He also competed in the semi-pro International Professional Rodeo Association (IPRA) and won five world championships in said organization; bull riding in 2002, and saddle bronc riding and all-around, both times in 2002 and 2003. In 2004, he won the average title at PRCA Xtreme Bulls Division II qualifying events in Clemson, South Carolina, and at Old Fort Days in Fort Smith, Arkansas. He also competed sporadically in the Professional Bull Riders (PBR) circuit.

In 2005, McCoy's career went more professional. He won the Four States Fair Rodeo in Texarkana, Arkansas; he was co-champion at the Beef Empire Days PRCA Rodeo in Garden City, Kansas; he won Red River Stampede PRCA Rodeo in Durant, Oklahoma; and he won the Mineral Wells, Texas PRCA Rodeo. He also competed at the Calgary Stampede. Like many PRCA bull riders in the 2000s and 2010s, McCoy also competed in the Championship Bull Riding (CBR) circuit. He qualified for the CBR World Finals in 2005, as well as qualifying for the PRCA's National Finals Rodeo (NFR) that same year. He placed 14th at the NFR.

In 2006, McCoy left the PRCA and CBR to compete full-time in the PBR. As a result of winning enough money on the PBR's minor league Challenger Tour, he earned a pathway to compete on the organization's premier tour, the Built Ford Tough Series (BFTS). He qualified for the PBR World Finals in 2006, 2008-2009 and 2011.

On June 15, 2010 it was announced that McCoy, with his brother Jet, would be the parade marshals for the Calgary Stampede parade that would take place on July 9, 2010.

McCoy's final professional bull riding out was at the PBR Touring Pro Division event in Decatur, Texas in June 2013. In October of that year, he announced his retirement from the sport.

In 2016, McCoy attempted a comeback as a rodeo contestant. He tried to qualify in saddle bronc riding for The American Rodeo's semi-finals by competing in some of the event's qualifiers. He also tried to qualify for the PRCA's National Finals Rodeo. As a result of a serious saddle bronc riding head injury from 2004 (the last year he competed professionally in said rodeo event), he rode with a helmet; something extremely rare among professional bucking horse riders. He ended up finishing low in the final PRCA world standings that year, and retired as a contestant for good, again.

=== Injuries ===
In September 26, 2004, McCoy had his skull crushed by a saddle bronc in Oklahoma City. He spent three days in a coma and had eight months of rehab before returning to the rodeo circuit. In 2005, he separated his shoulder in the fourth round of the NFR and missed the next six of 10 rounds with the injury. He placed fifth in the first round with an 83.5 on Rafter H Rodeo's Roan Wolf.

== The Amazing Race 16 ==
Cord and his brother Jet competed on The Amazing Race 16. They won 4 out of the 12 legs, and was the first team ever to go from last place on a non-elimination leg, complete a Speed Bump, and come in first place on the next leg. They won a pair of sailboats, and trips for two to Patagonia, Maui, and Alaska. In the final leg, they were placed 2nd, ultimately losing the one million dollar grand prize and "The Amazing Race 16" winners' title to brothers Dan and Jordan Pious.

=== Placements during the Race ===
- Leg 1: 3rd Place
- Leg 2: 1st Place (as a reward for getting 1st, Jet and Cord won a pair of sailboats)
- Leg 3: 1st Place (as a reward for getting 1st, Jet and Cord won a trip for two to Patagonia)
- Leg 4: 4th Place
- Leg 5: 3rd Place
- Leg 6: 4th Place
- Leg 7: 6th Place (They received a non-elimination leg Speed Bump)
- Leg 8: 1st Place (as a reward for getting 1st, Jet and Cord won a trip for two to Maui, Hawaii)
- Leg 9: 3rd Place
- Leg 10: 1st Place (as a reward for getting 1st, Jet and Cord won a trip for two to Alaska)
- Leg 11: 2nd Place
- Final Leg: 2nd Place

== The Amazing Race 18 ==
Cord, along with his brother Jet returned for the 18th season of The Amazing Race commonly known as The Amazing Race: Unfinished Business. They won $5,000 each in Leg 5. However, in the 9th leg, they fell to last place after the Roadblock in Liechtenstein and lost even more time when they were U-Turned by the Harlem Globetrotters of Flight Time & Big Easy on a Double U-Turn. They were the only team to be U-Turned on a Double U-Turn, and were eliminated in the 9th Leg.

=== Placements during the Race ===
- Leg 1: 11th Place (Special non-elimination leg)
- Leg 2: 3rd Place
- Leg 3: 6th Place
- Leg 4: 2nd Place
- Leg 5: 1st Place (as a reward for getting 1st, Jet and Cord won $5,000 each)
- Leg 6: 2nd Place
- Leg 7: 5th Place
- Leg 8: 5th Place
- Leg 9: 6th Place / eliminated (1st U-Turned by Flight Time & Big Easy but 2nd U-Turn was not used on a Double U-Turn)

== The Amazing Race 24: All Stars ==
Cord, along with his brother Jet returned for the 24th season of The Amazing Race commonly known as The Amazing Race: All Stars. In Leg 1, they won two Express Passes (one Express Pass which they can use to bypass any task and also get to keep it for themselves until Leg 8. As required by The Amazing Race rules, they had to hand over the other Express Pass to another team of their choosing before the end of Leg 5, and they gave the other Express Pass to country singers Caroline & Jennifer, who used it in Leg 2 to bypass the Roadblock). In Leg 4, they won a trip for two to London. In Leg 8, they used the Express Pass to bypass the Detour. In Leg 10, their season came to an end with a 5th Place finish due to being U-Turned by Leo & Jamal. They were the only team to be U-Turned on a Double U-Turn for the 2nd time, and were eliminated in the 10th Leg.

=== Placements during the Race ===
- Leg 1: 1st Place (as a reward for getting 1st, Jet and Cord won two express passes, which can be used to bypass any task. As required by Amazing Race rules, Jet and Cord opted to give the other express pass to fellow team Caroline and Jennifer, who used it during Leg 2 to bypass the Roadblock)
- Leg 2: 6th Place
- Leg 3: 2nd Place
- Leg 4: 1st Place (as a reward for getting 1st, Jet and Cord won a trip for two to London).
- Leg 5: 3rd Place
- Leg 6: 2nd Place
- Leg 7: 4th Place
- Leg 8: 2nd Place (used the Express Pass to bypass the Detour)
- Leg 9: 2nd Place
- Leg 10: 5th Place / eliminated (1st U-Turned by Leo & Jamal and Caroline & Jennifer attempted to use the 2nd U-Turn on Brendon & Rachel. However, Brendon & Rachel had already checked in at the Pit Stop and were not affected by the U-Turn)

== Post-career ==
In February 2017, McCoy was inducted into the Southwestern Oklahoma State University Athletics - Hall of Fame.

Since retiring as a rodeo contestant, McCoy and his wife Sara have bred and raised rodeo livestock with their company, McCoy Rodeo. One of their bucking bulls, Ridin' Solo, won the 2018 American Bucking Bull, Inc. (ABBI) World Champion Futurity Bull title, as well as the PBR World Champion Bull title in 2022 and 2023. Another one of their bucking bulls, Pegasus, was the 2025 Bull of the NFR. Cord and Sara also produce some PRCA rodeos.

In 2022, Cord became the head coach of the Oklahoma Freedom; one of eight bull riding teams in the PBR Team Series, which debuted that year. It runs from the summer to autumn and concludes with the Team Series Championship at T-Mobile Arena in Las Vegas, Nevada. 2009 PBR World Champion Kody Lostroh became the team's assistant coach. In September of that year, the Oklahoma Freedom won the event at Cowboy Days in Winston-Salem, North Carolina; the hometown event of rival team, the Carolina Cowboys. The very next weekend, the Freedom won their own hometown event at Freedom Fest in Oklahoma City, Oklahoma. They were the first team to win their own hometown event. The Freedom ended up finishing in fourth place at the conclusion of the inaugural PBR Team Series Championship.

In 2023, the Freedom were eliminated after the second day of the Team Series Championship.

In 2024, the Oklahoma Freedom became the Florida Freedom, as the team relocated to Sunrise, Florida. This resulted as the end of McCoy's tenure as the team's head coach, as well as Lostroh's tenure as assistant coach. Lostroh became the head coach of the newly-formed New York Mavericks, while McCoy became a color commentator for the PBR Team Series alongside longtime PBR commentator Craig Hummer. Since the 2025 season, McCoy is also a color commentator for the PBR's Unleash the Beast Series (UTB) alongside Hummer.

== Personal life ==
On November 1, 2009, McCoy proposed to his girlfriend Sara Best while being interviewed by PBR in front of an audience. They have a daughter, Tulsa, and reside in Lane, Oklahoma. He has three brothers, Justen Brent, JoRay C., and Jet Merrick, and one sister, Nikki.
