= 1982 Tour du Haut Var =

Race details
- Dates: 28 February 1982
- Stages: 1
- Distance: 185 km (115.0 mi)
- Winning time: 4h 59' 35"

Results
	Winner	Sean Kelly (IRL)
	Second	Francis Castaing (FRA)
	Third	Paul Sherwen (GBR)

The 1982 Tour du Haut Var was the 14th edition of the Tour du Haut Var cycle race and was held on 28 February 1982. The race started in Nice and finished in Seillans. The race was won by Sean Kelly.

== General classification ==
Final general classification

Rank	Rider	Time
1	Sean Kelly (IRL)	4h 59' 35"
2	Francis Castaing (FRA)	+ 0"
3	Paul Sherwen (GBR)	+ 0"
4	Gilbert Glaus (SUI)	+ 0"
5	Patrick Bonnet (FRA)	+ 0"
6	Paul Haghedooren (BEL)	+ 0"
7	René Bittinger (FRA)	+ 0"
8	Alain Dithurbide (FRA)	+ 0"
9	Stephen Roche (IRL)	+ 0"
10	Jacques Michaud (FRA)	+ 0"
