= 2026 PBR Team Series season =

- League: Professional Bull Riders
- Sport: Bull riding
- Duration: July 11 – November 8
- Teams: 10
- TV partner(s): The CW; CBS Sports
- Streaming partner: Paramount+

2026 PBR Teams Series Draft
- Top draft pick: Hayden Welsh
- Picked by: Kansas City Outlaws

Regular season
- Season champions: Missouri Thunder
- Runners-up: Austin Gamblers
- Season MVP: José Vitor Leme

PBR Teams Championship
- Venue: T-Mobile Arena
- Champions: Nashville Stampede
- Runners-up: Arizona Ridge Riders
- Championship MVP: Eduardo Aparecido

PBR Team Series seasons
- ← 2025

The 2026 PBR Team Series season was the fifth season of the PBR Team Series. The season started on July 11 in Fort Collins, Colorado, and concluded on November 8 in Las Vegas, Nevada. The Nashville Stampede won their second Team Series Championship title.

== Draft ==
The PBR Team Series Draft presented by Ditch Witch was held on June 2.

Rnd.	Pick	Team	Rider	Notes
1	1	Kansas City Outlaws	Hayden Welsh	
1	2	Nashville Stampede	Ky Hamilton	from Oklahoma
1	3	New York Mavericks	Dalton Allred	
1	4	Kansas City Outlaws	João Paulo Alves Velasco	from Nashville
1	5	Missouri Thunder	Angelo Junior Rossetto	
1	6	Austin Gamblers	Jesse Petri	
1	7	Carolina Cowboys	Elijiah Jennings	
1	8	Florida Freedom	Canyon Jolly	
1	9	Kansas City Outlaws	Trent Ferreir	from Texas
1	10	Oklahoma Wildcatters	Renan Almeida Alves Pinto	
2	11	Kansas City Outlaws	Luiz Gabriel Rosa	
2	12	Oklahoma Wildcatters	Jack Mitchell	
2	13	New York Mavericks	Jacob Carige	
2	14	Texas Rattlers	Jesus Villa	
2	15	Missouri Thunder	Carson Watford	
2	16	Austin Gamblers	Passed	
2	17	Arizona Ridge Riders	Brock Poulin	
2	18	Florida Freedom	Passed	
2	19	Texas Rattlers	Passed	
2	20	Carolina Cowboys	Jake Lockwood	
3	21	Kansas City Outlaws	Passed	
3	22	Oklahoma Wildcatters	Leonardo Matos Pereira	
3	23	New York Mavericks	Passed	
3	24	Nashville Stampede	Jayden Roy	
3	25	Carolina Cowboys	Kaleb Lewis	from Missouri
3	26	Arizona Ridge Riders	Passed	

== Schedule ==
No.	Event	Venue	Location	Date	Time (ET)
1	PBR Bulls & Beats	Canvas Stadium	Fort Collins, Colorado	July 11	9:45 p.m.
1	PBR Bulls & Beats	Canvas Stadium	Fort Collins, Colorado	July 12	3:45 p.m.
2	PBR Wildcatter Days presented by zone Premium Nicotine Pouches	Paycom Center	Oklahoma City, Oklahoma	July 31	8:45 p.m.
2	PBR Wildcatter Days presented by zone Premium Nicotine Pouches	Paycom Center	Oklahoma City, Oklahoma	August 1	7:45 p.m.
2	PBR Wildcatter Days presented by zone Premium Nicotine Pouches	Paycom Center	Oklahoma City, Oklahoma	August 2	2:45 p.m.
3	PBR Freedom Days presented by Breedlove Wound Care	Amerant Bank Arena	Sunrise, Florida	August 7	7:45 p.m.
3	PBR Freedom Days presented by Breedlove Wound Care	Amerant Bank Arena	Sunrise, Florida	August 8	6:45 p.m.
3	PBR Freedom Days presented by Breedlove Wound Care	Amerant Bank Arena	Sunrise, Florida	August 9	1:45 p.m.
4	PBR Stampede Days	Bridgestone Arena	Nashville, Tennessee	August 14	8:45 p.m.
4	PBR Stampede Days	Bridgestone Arena	Nashville, Tennessee	August 15	7:45 p.m.
4	PBR Stampede Days	Bridgestone Arena	Nashville, Tennessee	August 16	1:15 p.m.
5	PBR Gambler Days presented by Tecovas	Moody Center	Austin, Texas	August 21	8:45 p.m.
5	PBR Gambler Days presented by Tecovas	Moody Center	Austin, Texas	August 22	7:15 p.m.
5	PBR Gambler Days presented by Tecovas	Moody Center	Austin, Texas	August 23	2:45 p.m.
6	Bass Pro Shops PBR Thunder Days presented by DoorDash	Thunder Ridge Nature Arena	Ridgedale, Missouri	September 4	8:45 p.m.
6	Bass Pro Shops PBR Thunder Days presented by DoorDash	Thunder Ridge Nature Arena	Ridgedale, Missouri	September 5	7:45 p.m.
6	Bass Pro Shops PBR Thunder Days presented by DoorDash	Thunder Ridge Nature Arena	Ridgedale, Missouri	September 6	3:15 p.m.
7	PBR Teams: Anaheim	Honda Center	Anaheim, California	September 11	10:45 p.m.
7	PBR Teams: Anaheim	Honda Center	Anaheim, California	September 12	9:45 p.m.
7	PBR Teams: Anaheim	Honda Center	Anaheim, California	September 13	4:15 p.m.
8	PBR Cowboy Days presented by Patriot Mobile	First Horizon Coliseum	Greensboro, North Carolina	September 18	7:45 p.m.
8	PBR Cowboy Days presented by Patriot Mobile	First Horizon Coliseum	Greensboro, North Carolina	September 19	7:15 p.m.
8	PBR Cowboy Days presented by Patriot Mobile	First Horizon Coliseum	Greensboro, North Carolina	September 20	12:15 p.m.
9	PBR Rattler Days presented by Germania Insurance	Dickies Arena	Fort Worth, Texas	October 2	8:45 p.m.
9	PBR Rattler Days presented by Germania Insurance	Dickies Arena	Fort Worth, Texas	October 3	7:45 p.m.
9	PBR Rattler Days presented by Germania Insurance	Dickies Arena	Fort Worth, Texas	October 4	2:45 p.m.
10	PBR Ridge Rider Days presented by Energy Transfer	Desert Diamond Arena	Glendale, Arizona	October 8	9:45 p.m.
10	PBR Ridge Rider Days presented by Energy Transfer	Desert Diamond Arena	Glendale, Arizona	October 9	9:45 p.m.
10	PBR Ridge Rider Days presented by Energy Transfer	Desert Diamond Arena	Glendale, Arizona	October 10	8:45 p.m.
11	PBR Go Bowling Maverick Days	UBS Arena	Elmont, New York	October 16	7:45 p.m.
11	PBR Go Bowling Maverick Days	UBS Arena	Elmont, New York	October 17	6:45 p.m.
11	PBR Go Bowling Maverick Days	UBS Arena	Elmont, New York	October 18	1:15 p.m.
12	PBR Outlaw Days presented by Bad Boy Mowers and Tractors	T-Mobile Center	Kansas City, Missouri	October 23	8:45 p.m.
12	PBR Outlaw Days presented by Bad Boy Mowers and Tractors	T-Mobile Center	Kansas City, Missouri	October 24	7:45 p.m.
12	PBR Outlaw Days presented by Bad Boy Mowers and Tractors	T-Mobile Center	Kansas City, Missouri	October 25	2:45 p.m.
13	PBR Teams Championship	T-Mobile Arena	Las Vegas, Nevada	November 6	10:45 p.m.
13	PBR Teams Championship	T-Mobile Arena	Las Vegas, Nevada	November 7	7:45 p.m.
13	PBR Teams Championship	T-Mobile Arena	Las Vegas, Nevada	November 8	5:15 p.m.

== Regular season standings ==
Pos.	Team	W	L	Pct.	Behind	Score	Rides	Outs	Pct.	Winnings

== Awards ==
Award	Recipient	Team
Regular-Season MVP	(Brazil) José Vitor Leme	(Texas) Austin Gamblers
Championship MVP	(Brazil) Eduardo Aparecido	Arizona Ridge Riders
Rookie of the Year	(Brazil) Jean Carlos Teodoro	Texas Rattlers
Coach of the Year	TBD	TBD
General Manager of the Year	TBD	TBD
