= Meusburger =

Meusburger is a surname. Notable people with the surname include:

- Catherine Meusburger (born 1978), Austrian mathematician and physicist
- Josef Meusburger, Austrian para-alpine skier
- Stefan Meusburger (born 1993), Austrian footballer
- Yvonne Meusburger (born 1983), Austrian tennis player
