= PBR Team Series =

Bull riding competition

- Current season, competition or edition: 2026 PBR Team Series season
- Formerly: PBR Camping World Team Series (2023–2025)
- Association: Professional Bull Riders
- Sport: Bull riding
- Founded: November 5, 2021; 5 years ago
- First season: 2022
- Commissioner: Sean Gleason
- No. of teams: 10
- Country: United States
- Headquarters: Fort Worth, Texas, U.S.
- Most recent champion: Nashville Stampede (2026)
- Broadcasters: CBS Sports; The CW
- Streaming partner: Paramount+
- Sponsor: Camping World (2023–2025)

The PBR Teams Series, also known as PBR Teams, is a professional bull riding team competition organized by Professional Bull Riders (PBR). The series was established in 2021 and held its inaugural season in 2022, introducing a team-based format to professional bull riding in which riders compete as members of franchises representing cities and regions across the United States.

The PBR Teams Series was initially contested by eight teams in 2022 and has since expanded to ten teams. The competition features both regular-season homestands and neutral-site events, with teams competing in head-to-head matchups. The championship is determined through a postseason tournament featuring a progressive-elimination format. The Nashville Stampede are the reigning champions, having won the 2026 championship.

Camping World was the title sponsor of the PBR Team Series from 2023 to 2025. During that time the series was knows as the PBR Camping World Team Series.

== History ==
On November 5, 2021, Professional Bull Riders (PBR) announced the creation of the PBR Team Series, a new team-based league designed to complement the organization's individual Unleash the Beast Series. The inaugural season was scheduled to begin in June 2022 and feature eight founding teams competing in a 10-weekend regular season followed by a team playoff and championship. Each team was to be based in a designated home market and host an annual bull riding event, while two additional events were planned at neutral sites. The league's teams, ownership groups, and home markets were to be announced in early 2022. On November 6, the PBR announced that T-Mobile Arena in Las Vegas, Nevada, would host the inaugural PBR Team Series playoffs and championship. The championship was scheduled for November 4–6, 2022, and would determine the first PBR Team Series champion.

On January 6, 2022, the founding eight members were announced: the Ariat Texas Rattlers based in Fort Worth, Texas; the Arizona Ridge Riders based in Glendale, Arizona; the Austin Gamblers based in Austin, Texas; the Carolina Chaos based in Winston-Salem, North Carolina; the Kansas City Outlaws based in Kansas City, Missouri; the Missouri Thunder based in Ridgedale, Missouri; the Nashville Stampede based in Nashville, Tennessee; and the Oklahoma Freedom based in Oklahoma City, Oklahoma. On January 7, a draft lottery was held in New York City to determine the inaugural draft order. On March 15, the Carolina Chaos were renamed to the Carolina Cowboys.

On March 4, 2022, the PBR announced the inaugural season's event schedule. It included eight homestands, two neutral site events, and the PBR Team Series Finals.

On July 19, 2023, it was announced that the PBR and Camping World signed a multi-year deal to be the title sponsor of the PBR Team Series.

== Teams ==
Current PBR Team Series team locations (founding teams in red; expansion teams in blue).

| Team | City | Arena | First season | Owner | General manager | Head coach |
|---|---|---|---|---|---|---|
| Texas Rattlers | Fort Worth, Texas | Ariat Arena | 2022 | John Fisher | Chad Blankenship | Cody Lambert |
| Arizona Ridge Riders | Glendale, Arizona | Desert Diamond Arena | 2022 | Thomas Tull | Casey Lane | Colby Yates |
| Austin Gamblers | Austin, Texas | Moody Center | 2022 | Egon Durban | JJ Gottsch | Michael Gaffney |
| Carolina Cowboys (Note: Originally announced as the Carolina Chaos before rebranding to the Carolina Cowboys.) | Greensboro, North Carolina | First Horizon Coliseum | 2022 | Richard Childress and Jeff Broin | Austin Dillon | Jerome Davis |
| Florida Freedom (Note: Originally the Oklahoma Freedom before relocating to Florida in 2024.) | Sunrise, Florida | Amerant Bank Arena | 2022 | Heath Freeman | DeVon Edwards | Paulo Crimber |
| Kansas City Outlaws | Kansas City, Missouri | T-Mobile Center | 2022 | Phil Pulley | Jon Williams | J.W. Hart |
| Missouri Thunder | Ridgedale, Missouri | Thunder Ridge Nature Arena | 2022 | Johnny Morris | Luke Snyder | Ross Coleman |
| Nashville Stampede | Nashville, Tennessee | Bridgestone Arena | 2022 | Morris Communications | Tina Battock | Justin McBride |
| New York Mavericks | Elmont, New York | UBS Arena | 2024 | Marc Lasry | Chris Pantani | Kody Lostroh |
| Oklahoma Wildcatters | Oklahoma City, Oklahoma | Paycom Center | 2024 | Talor Gooch | Chris Dashney | Shawn Ramirez |

=== Expansion ===
The league will expand to 12 teams in 2027 with potential expansion markets including Atlanta, Chicago, Denver, Detroit, Edmonton, Southern California, Sacramento, and Salt Lake City.

== Season format ==
=== Regular season ===
The PBR Teams Series regular season consists of head-to-head team games contested during a series of events throughout the season. Each team competes against another team in a five-on-five matchup, with five riders from each team designated to compete in the game. Each rider attempts to remain on a bull for eight seconds, with qualified rides receiving a score based on the rider's and bull's performances. The scores of the team's qualified rides are combined to determine its game score, with the team accumulating the higher total winning the game.

Teams earn standings points based on their results during the regular season. The regular season standings determine seeding for the PBR Teams Championship, with teams advancing to the postseason according to the league's championship qualification and elimination format. Regular-season games are contested at team homestands and selected neutral-site events, allowing each franchise to host an event in its home market during the season.

The number of regular season games and events has changed as the league has expanded. The inaugural 2022 season featured eight teams playing 28 regular-season games each. The league retained an eight-team format through 2023 before expanding to 10 teams in 2024. Subsequent seasons have used revised schedules and game totals as PBR adjusted the competition's event and scheduling structure.

=== Postseason ===
The PBR Teams Series postseason culminates in the PBR Teams Championship, a progressive-elimination tournament contested after the regular season. Teams are seeded according to their final regular season standings, with higher-seeded teams receiving advantages in the opening stages of the championship. Championship games use the same five-on-five, head-to-head format as regular season games, with the winning team advancing and losing teams facing elimination or a Last Chance Game depending on the stage of the tournament.

Beginning in 2024, the championship was expanded to accommodate the league's 10-team format. The top six teams in the regular season standings automatically qualified for the championship, while the teams finishing seventh through tenth competed in a Ride-In Round for the final two championship berths. The top two seeds then received first-round byes, while the remaining teams competed in the opening rounds of the progressive-elimination tournament.

For the 2025 championship, PBR revised the postseason format so that all 10 teams participated in the championship event. The top three teams in the regular season standings received byes into the second day, while the remaining seven teams competed on Wild Card Friday. Teams ranked eighth through tenth competed in a three-team opening game, while additional games and a Last Chance Game determined which teams advanced. Saturday included another three-team Last Chance Game, and Sunday's schedule consisted of semifinal games, a third-place game, and the championship game.

== Trophies and awards ==
=== Regular season champions ===
| Season | Team | Record | Score | Regular-Season MVP | Rookie of the Year |
|---|---|---|---|---|---|
| 2022 | Austin Gamblers | 16–12 | 4426.50 | (Brazil) José Vitor Leme (Austin Gamblers) | —N/a |
| 2023 | Austin Gamblers | 19–9 | 4370.75 | (Brazil) José Vitor Leme (Austin Gamblers) | —N/a |
| 2024 | Kansas City Outlaws | 19–9 | 6329.25 | (United States) John Crimber (Florida Freedom) | —N/a |
| 2025 | Florida Freedom | 25–10 | 8375.50 | (United States) John Crimber (Florida Freedom) | (Brazil) Everton Natan da Silva (Arizona Ridge Riders) |
| 2026 | Missouri Thunder | 24–11 | 7389.10 | (Brazil) José Vitor Leme (Austin Gamblers) | (Brazil) Jean Carlos Teodoro (Texas Rattlers) |

=== Championship winners ===
| Season | Date | Winners | Score | | Runner-ups | Championship MVP |
|---|---|---|---|---|---|---|
| 2022 | November 6, 2022 | Nashville Stampede | 226.00 | 201.50 | Arizona Ridge Riders | —N/a |
| 2023 | October 22, 2023 | Texas Rattlers | 355.25 | 265.25 | Austin Gamblers | (Brazil) João Ricardo Vieira (Texas Rattlers) |
| 2024 | October 20, 2024 | Austin Gamblers | 357.50 | 252.50 | Carolina Cowboys | (United States) John Crimber (Florida Freedom) |
| 2025 | October 26, 2025 | Carolina Cowboys | 242.50 | 177.75 | Missouri Thunder | (United States) Clay Guiton (Carolina Cowboys) |
| 2026 | November 8, 2026 | Nashville Stampede | 356.45 | 268.35 | Arizona Ridge Riders | (Brazil) Eduardo Aparecido (Arizona Ridge Riders) |

=== Monster Energy Team Challenge champions ===
| Season | Date | Winners | Score | | Runner-ups |
|---|---|---|---|---|---|
| 2026 | April 24, 2026 | Missouri Thunder | 254.75 | 171.35 | Austin Gamblers |

== Draft ==
The PBR Teams Series Draft is used to allocate riders to teams before the start of each season. Teams select eligible riders from the available pool in a predetermined selection order, with the draft intended to establish and maintain the rosters used during the regular season. Riders selected in the draft become members of the selecting team and may subsequently be retained, traded, released, or replaced in accordance with league rules.

The inaugural PBR Team Series Draft was held in Fort Worth, Texas, in 2022 ahead of the league's first season. The eight founding teams participated in the draft, with riders selected to form the initial rosters for the new team competition.

Following the expansion of the league to 10 teams in 2024, the PBR held an expansion draft for the New York Mavericks and Oklahoma Wildcatters. The six-round expansion draft allowed the two new franchises to select riders from the existing league player pool before their inaugural seasons.

== Free agency ==
Free agency is one of the mechanisms used by the PBR Team Series to add riders to team rosters outside of the league's draft process. Teams may sign eligible riders who are not under contract with another team, allowing franchises to add riders during the offseason and, subject to league rules, during the season. Free-agent signings can be used to fill roster vacancies, strengthen a team's lineup, or replace riders who are released, injured, or otherwise unavailable.
