= Bob Roll =

American cyclist (born 1960)

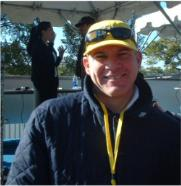
- Roll at the 2003 Tour of Hope in Washington, D.C.

Personal information
- Born: July 7, 1960 (age 66) Oakland, California, U.S.

Cycling career
- Sport: Cycling
- Discipline: Road
- Role: Rider

Professional teams
- 1985–1990: 7-Eleven–Hoonved
- 1991: Motorola
- 1992: Z

Bob Roll (born July 7, 1960) is an American former professional cyclist, author, and television sports commentator. He was a member of the 7-Eleven team until 1990 and competed for the Motorola team in 1991. In 1992 Roll moved to Greg LeMond's Z team and added mountain biking to his racing accomplishments. Roll continued racing mountain bikes professionally through 1998.

He has written Bobke: A Ride on the Wild Side of Cycling, Bobke II, and two Tour de France Companion volumes. ("Bobke" is Southern Dutch for "Bobby".) He has also had many columns published in VeloNews.

== Cycling career ==
Roll started cycling in 1981 in his home region of Northern California. He spent two years in the States racing before heading to Belgium to race. Two years later he became a professional cyclist for 7-Eleven: his first race was the 1985 Giro d'Italia. During the 1988 Giro d'Italia Roll's job as a domestique pushed him to the limit, causing him to pass out at the finish and his heart to stop beating.

In 1998 a young Lance Armstrong, continuing to recover from testicular cancer, had recently dropped out of the Paris–Nice cycling race. Armstrong's training coach, Chris Carmichael, invited Roll to journey to Boone, North Carolina, to talk with Lance and do training rides with the young Armstrong for several days. Armstrong was extremely discouraged by his recent European cycling results and was close to retiring. Armstrong was refocused after eight long days riding in the rain with Roll, whose tale of the ride is in Bobke II; Armstrong's is in It's Not About the Bike.

== Post cycling ==
Roll continues to enjoy riding road and mountain bicycles for recreation, and is a member of the veteran cable television broadcasting team (along with Phil Liggett, MBE and the late Paul Sherwen) who serve as road cycling expert-commentators for the NBC Sports Network cable network's coverage of the Tour de France, Vuelta a España, Giro d'Italia, Paris–Roubaix, Tour of California, and other international cycling road races.

Roll has appeared in a series of Road ID Tour de France television commercials as himself, riding a bus along with "Tour Mania" (a costumed-disguised rowdy faux rock group played by well-known professional cyclists, such as George Hincapie).

== Major results ==
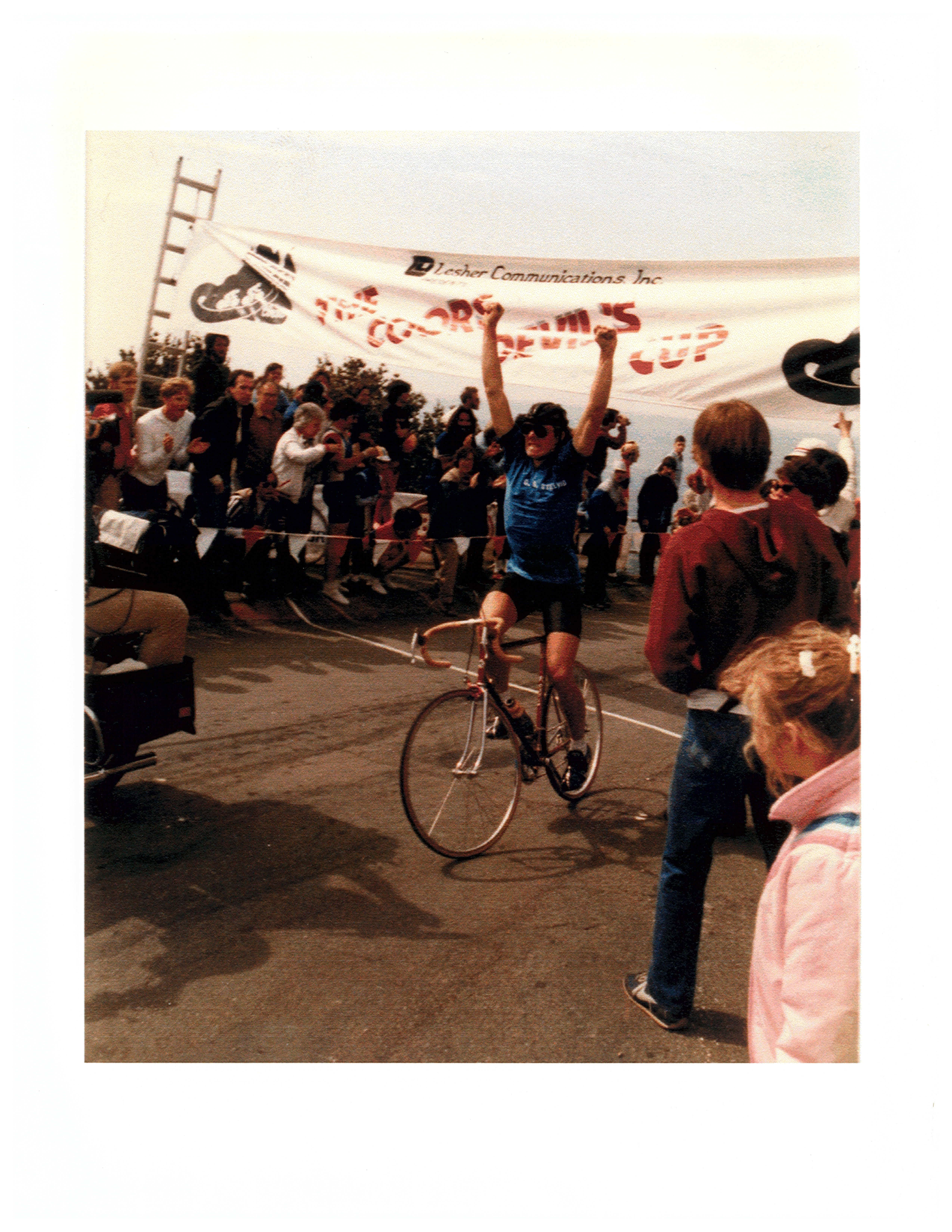
Bob Roll wins stage 1985 Coors Devils Cup Mt Diablo.

1985
10th Overall Coors Classic

1st Stage 9

1986
1st Stage 3 Rocky Mountains Classic
1st Stage 3 Vuelta de Baja California
1st Stage 3 (TTT) Redlands Bicycle Classic
1987
1st Affoltern am Albis Criterium
6th Eschborn–Frankfurt
7th Overall Milk Race
8th Tour du Nord-Ouest
1988
1st Stage 3 Tour de Romandie
1990
1st Stage 2 Tucson Bicycle Classic
1992
5th Overall Tour of the Adirondacks
1997
1st San Francisco Hill Climb
1998
1st San Francisco Hill Climb

=== Grand Tour general classification results timeline ===
Grand Tour	1985	1986	1987	1988	1989	1990
Vuelta a España	—	—	—	—	—	—
Giro d'Italia	78	—	—	61	114	—
Tour de France	—	63	DNF	—	—	132

Legend
—	Did not compete
DNF	Did not finish

== Bibliography ==
- Roll, Bob (1995). Bobke: A Ride on the Wild Side of Cycling. Boulder, Colo.: Velo Press. ISBN 1-884737-12-9. OCLC 41853737.
- Roll, Bob; Roll, Bob (2003). Bobke II. Boulder, Colo.: VeloPress. ISBN 978-1-931382-28-1. OCLC 53097074.
- Roll, Bob; Koeppel, Dan (2005). The Tour de France Companion 2005: A Nuts, Bolts & Spokes Guide to the Greatest Race in the World. New York: Workman; Godalming : Melia [distributor]. ISBN 978-0-7611-3798-6. OCLC 58053518.
