= Kody Lostroh =

American bull rider

Personal information
- Born: September 18, 1985 (age 41) Longmont, Colorado, U.S.
- Height: 5 ft 6 in (1.68 m) (2018)
- Weight: 155 lb (70 kg) (2018)

Sport
- Sport: Rodeo
- Event: Bull riding
- Turned pro: 2004
- Retired: 2018

Achievements and titles
- Highest world ranking: 2009 PBR World Champion; 2005 PBR Rookie of the Year

Kody Lostroh (born September 18, 1985) is an American former professional rodeo cowboy who specialized in bull riding. He was the 2009 PBR World Champion.

In 2023, Lostroh was ranked No. 22 on the list of the top 30 bull riders in PBR history. Since 2024, he has been the head coach of the New York Mavericks in the PBR Team Series.

== Background ==
Kody Lostroh was born on September 18, 1985, in Longmont, Colorado. He watched a video of Cheyenne Frontier Days so many times that his mother Dena Schlutz signed him up to ride at the Boulder County Fair in 1993, when he was seven years old. He won a Little Britches Rodeo national bull riding title in 2003 and the Colorado High School Rodeo bull riding championship three consecutive years.

Lostroh was attending the University of Wyoming, but quit after a semester to pursue the Professional Bull Riders (PBR) circuit.

== Contestant career ==
In 2005, during his rookie year on the PBR's Built Ford Tough Series (BFTS), Lostroh won the first round of the event in Uniondale, New York, the Nassau Open, and became eligible for the Mossy Oak Shootout bonus worth $35,000. He successfully rode his bull and collected the bounty. He later ended up winning the overall event. He later won the 2005 PBR Rookie of the Year title, and in 2009, he won the PBR world championship. He qualified for the PBR World Finals 10 consecutive times (2005 through 2014).

Lostroh suffered multiple injuries throughout his career. For example, Lostroh injured his riding hand in January 2014 and missed most of the first half of that season.

In 2015, Lostroh decided to leave the PBR to compete in the Professional Rodeo Cowboys Association (PRCA) circuit and try to qualify for the National Finals Rodeo (NFR). In August 2017, he was considering retirement to spend more time with his two daughters, when he began experiencing significant health problems. He was eventually diagnosed with a tumor wrapped around his carotid artery, requiring surgery. He went back to the PBR but still had some reservations.

On March 29, 2018, Lostroh announced his retirement from bull riding.

During his PBR career, in addition to winning the 2005 Rookie of the Year title and the 2009 world championship, Lostroh won a total of 24 events and won over $3.2 million.

== Coaching career ==
In 2022, Lostroh became the assistant coach to head coach Cord McCoy of the Oklahoma Freedom; one of eight bull riding teams in the PBR Team Series, which debuted that year. It runs from the summer to autumn and concludes with the Team Series Championship at T-Mobile Arena in Las Vegas, Nevada. In September of that year, the Oklahoma Freedom won the event at Cowboy Days in Winston-Salem, North Carolina; the hometown event of rival team, the Carolina Cowboys. The very next weekend, the Freedom won their own hometown event at Freedom Fest in Oklahoma City, Oklahoma. They were the first team to win their hometown event. The Freedom ended up finishing in fourth place at the conclusion of the inaugural PBR Team Series Championship.

In 2023, the Freedom were eliminated after the second day of the Team Series Championship.

In 2024, the Oklahoma Freedom became the Florida Freedom, as the team relocated to Sunrise, Florida. As a result, McCoy and Lostroh's respective positions as head coach and assistant came to an end. Lostroh then became the head coach of the New York Mavericks; one of two new PBR teams which debuted that year. That same year, the PBR Team Series introduced the Ride-In Round. The event, which took place at the South Point Arena in Las Vegas, had the bottom four teams from the regular season compete against each other to determine the final two teams who competed at the Team Series Championship. The New York Mavericks, along with the Nashville Stampede moved on to the Championship event, defeating the Arizona Ridge Riders and Oklahoma Wildcatters. Both the Mavericks and Stampede were eliminated after the first round of the Championship. In 2025, the PBR discontinued the Ride-In Round, meaning all 10 teams now compete at the Team Series Championship.

In January 2025, the New York Mavericks defeated the Florida Freedom to win the inaugural PBR Monster Energy Team Challenge presented by Camping World at the Unleash the Beast Series (UTB) event in New York City.

The New York Mavericks were eliminated after the first day of the 2025 Team Series Championship event in October.

In January 2026, the New York Mavericks defeated the Carolina Cowboys to win the Monster Energy Team Challenge at the UTB event in New York City.

The New York Mavericks finished seventh during the 2026 Team Series regular season. On the first day of the Team Series Championship, they were defeated by the Carolina Cowboys, but came back to the Last Chance Game, where the Arizona Ridge Riders eliminated both the Mavericks and Kansas City Outlaws.

== Honors ==
In September 2023, Lostroh was inducted into the PBR Ring of Honor at the National Cowboy & Western Heritage Museum in Oklahoma City, Oklahoma. Also in 2023, Lostroh was ranked No. 22 on the list of the top 30 bull riders in PBR history.

In May 2024, Lostroh was inducted into the Bull Riding Hall of Fame.

== Personal life ==
He raises bucking bulls in Ault, Colorado, at the Shield of Faith Cattle Company. As of 2016, Lostroh and his wife, Candace, who is a barrel racer, live in Ault, Colorado, with their two daughters.
