= Brent Musburger =

American sportscaster (born 1939)

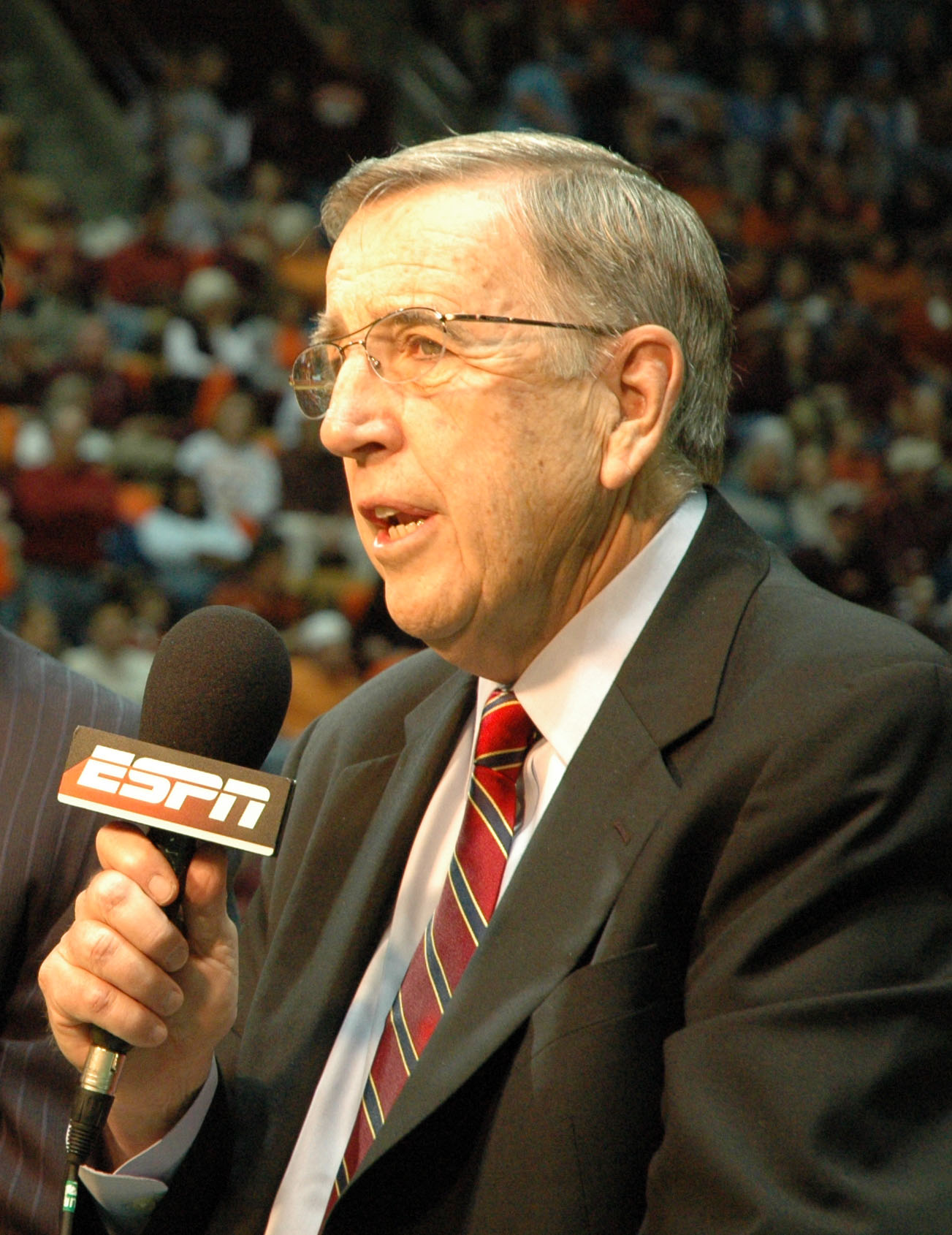
- Musburger at Cassell Coliseum in 2007
- Born: Brent Woody Musburger; May 26, 1939 (age 87); Portland, Oregon, U.S.
- Education: Northwestern University
- Occupation: Sportscaster
- Years active: 1968–present
- Spouse: Arlene Clare Sander (m. 1963)
- Children: 2
- Family: Todd Musburger (brother)

Brent Woody Musburger (born May 26, 1939) is an American sportscaster, currently the lead broadcaster and managing editor at Vegas Stats and Information Network (VSiN).

With CBS Sports from 1973 until 1990, he was a longtime host of their program The NFL Today and is credited with coining the phrase "March Madness" to describe the NCAA Division I men's basketball tournament while covering the Final Four. While at CBS, Musburger also covered the Super Bowl, NBA Finals, the World Series, U.S. Open tennis, The Masters and college football, including Hail Flutie and Catholics vs. Convicts.

Joining ESPN and ABC Sports in 1990, Musburger continued to cover the NBA Finals, as well as hosting Monday Night Football and providing play-by-play for Saturday Night Football and the SEC Network. He covered the Indianapolis 500 motor race, U.S. Open and British Open golf, the FIFA World Cup in soccer, the Belmont Stakes in horse racing, the Rose Bowl and the College Football national championship among other big events. In January 2017, he left the ESPN and ABC television networks after 27 years, briefly retiring from play-by-play of live sports before returning as the play-by-play voice of the Las Vegas Raiders from 2018 until 2022.

Raised in Billings, Montana, he is a member of the Montana Broadcaster's Association Hall of Fame.

== Early life and career ==
Musburger was born in Portland, Oregon, and raised in Billings, Montana, the son of Beryl Ruth (Woody) and Cec Musburger. His brother, Todd Musburger, is a prominent sports agent.

His love of sports began as a boy, where he played Little League Baseball and was a boyhood friend of former Major League pitcher Dave McNally. He also sold programs at Billings Mustangs games in the late 1940s and early 50s.

Musburger's youth included some brushes with trouble: when he was 12, he and his brother stole a car belonging to their mother's cleaning lady and took it for a joy ride. His parents sent him to the Shattuck-St. Mary's School in Faribault, Minnesota. Educated at Northwestern University's Medill School of Journalism, he was kicked out for a year for owning and operating a car without a license.

Around this time, Musburger was a minor league baseball umpire in the Class-D Midwest League for the 1959 season. While it had been previously reported that Musburger was the home plate umpire when Tim McCarver, future MLB All-Star and Ford C. Frick Award winner, made his professional baseball debut that summer for the Keokuk Cardinals, the story is apocryphal. However, Musburger did umpire games of McCarver's later that season.

Musburger began his career as a sportswriter for the now-defunct Chicago American newspaper, where his editor was sportswriter Warren Brown. In 1968, Musburger penned a column regarding Tommie Smith and John Carlos's protest of racial injustice in the United States with a Black Power salute on the medal stand during the 1968 Summer Olympics. In it he stated "Smith and Carlos looked like a couple of black-skinned storm troopers" who were "ignoble," "juvenile," and "unimaginative." In a 1999 article in The New York Times, Musburger stated that comparing the two to the Nazis was "harsh," but he stood by his criticism of the pair's action:

Did [Smith and Carlos' action] improve anything? ... Smith and Carlos aside, I object to using the Olympic awards stand to make a political statement.

According to Carlos, Musburger never apologized:

We are talking about someone who compared us to Nazis. Think about that. Here we are standing up to apartheid and to a man in Avery Brundage who delivered the Olympics to Hitler's Germany. And here's Musburger calling us Nazis. That got around. It followed us. It hurt us. It hurt my wife, my kids. I've never been able to confront him about why he did this. Every time I've been at a function or an event with Brent Musburger and I walk towards him, he heads the other way.

Carlos later told Jemele Hill during a 2019 discussion that "Brent Musburger doesn't even exist in my mind. He didn't mean anything to me 51 years ago. He doesn't mean anything to me today. Because he's been proven to be wrong."

In 1968, Musburger began a 22-year association with CBS, first as a sports anchor for WBBM radio and later for WBBM-TV. In the mid-1970s, Musburger moved to Los Angeles and anchored news and sports for KNXT (now KCBS-TV); there he worked alongside Connie Chung as a co-anchor on KNXT's evening newscasts from 1978 until 1980, when he joined CBS Sports full-time.

In 2020, Musburger told the Sports Illustrated Media Podcast that he has always won while betting the length of the Super Bowl national anthem by having his friends attend the rehearsal the day before the game and time it: "Some people have lip-synched it and that was an easy win because that recording is automatic."

== CBS Sports (1973–1990) ==
Beginning in late 1973, Musburger was doing play-by-play for CBS Sports. He started out doing regular season National Football League games (future The NFL Today co-host Irv Cross was also doing NFL games at that time as well). Musburger was paired with Tommy Mason or Bart Starr, who provided the color commentary. A year later, Wayne Walker would be paired with Musburger in the booth.

By 1975 at CBS, Musburger went from doing NFL play-by-play (and other items, mostly on CBS' Sports Saturday/Sunday programs) to rising to prominence as the host of the network's National Football League studio show, The NFL Today. Suddenly, Musburger began to cover many assignments for CBS Sports. Among the other events he covered, either as studio host or play-by-play announcer, were college football and basketball, the National Basketball Association, horse racing, the U.S. Open (tennis) tournament, and The Masters golf tournament. Musburger also called Major League Baseball games for CBS Radio. He would even lend his talents to weekend afternoon CBS Sports Spectacular fare such as The World's Strongest Man contests, the World Series of Poker, and the like.

=== The NFL Today ===
But it was Musburger's association with The NFL Today that made him famous. During his tenure, CBS' NFL pregame show was consistently the #1 rated pregame show. One of the signatures of the program was Musburger's show-opening teases to the various games CBS would cover, along with live images from the various stadiums. Musburger's accompanying intro to each visual, "You are looking live at ..." became one of his catch phrases. In promoting the network, his voice often tailed off on the last letter of "CBS" ("C.B. eeezz"), creating another catch phrase.

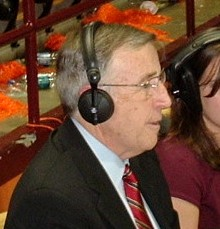

Musburger made headlines when he got into a fist-fight with The NFL Today's betting analyst Jimmy "The Greek" Snyder in a Manhattan bar on October 27, 1980. However, the fist-fight incident was quickly regarded as water under the bridge as the two cheerfully appeared on The NFL Today the following week wearing boxing gloves on camera.

=== CBS departure ===
By the late 1980s, Musburger was CBS's top sportscaster. He was the main host and play-by-play announcer for the NBA Finals, college basketball, college football, the Belmont Stakes, and the College World Series. He also hosted a New Year's Eve countdown for CBS. Musburger is regarded as the first broadcaster to apply the term March Madness to the annual NCAA Men's Division I Basketball Championship tournament.

Early in 1990, CBS underwent a significant management change. During the early morning hours of April 1, 1990, Musburger was fired from CBS. His final assignment for CBS came the following evening, doing play-by-play for the 1990 NCAA men's basketball final, which was Duke versus UNLV. When the game was completed, Musburger thanked the audience and CBS Sports, and the analysts that he had worked with through the years like Billy Packer, who was standing next to him.

At the time of his firing (which he originally thought was an April Fools joke), Musburger had been set to handle play-by-play duties for CBS's television coverage of Major League Baseball later that month; he was replaced by Jack Buck in that capacity. His position at The NFL Today was filled by Greg Gumbel. His position as the lead play-by-play announcer for college basketball was filled by Jim Nantz.

== ABC Sports and ESPN (1990–2017) ==
Following his dismissal from CBS, Musburger considered several offers, including one to return to Chicago and work at WGN-TV, ultimately settling at ABC. With Al Michaels entrenched as ABC's top broadcaster, Musburger focused on college football and basketball. After his hiring, ABC's merger with ESPN under the Disney umbrella allowed him to work on ESPN as well (increasingly since 2006), including Major League Baseball, NBA games, ESPN Radio, golf tournaments, horse racing, the Indianapolis 500, Little League World Series, soccer games, college football, and even some NFL games (including hosting halftime duties for Monday Night Football and Wild Card round games). Musburger was also the main studio host during ABC's coverage of the 1998 World Cup and the 2006 World Cup, was briefly the studio host for ESPN and ABC's NASCAR coverage and has hosted Tour de France coverage for ABC.

=== Major League Baseball ===
In 1995, Musburger called Games 3-5 of the American League Division Series between the Seattle Mariners and New York Yankees alongside Jim Kaat for ABC in association with The Baseball Network. The fifth and decisive game went into the bottom of the 11th inning before Edgar Martínez won it for Seattle with a double that scored both Joey Cora and Ken Griffey Jr., sending them to the League Championship Series for the first time in their franchise's history.

No balls and a strike to Martínez. Line drive, we are tied! Griffey is coming around! In the corner is Bernie. He's going to try to score! Here's the division championship! Mariners win it! Mariners win it!

Musberger's call, dramatic as it was, incorrectly implied that Bernie Williams fielded the double in left. Bernie was playing center field at the time. Gerald Williams was in left field playing the ball and making the late throw back to the infield.

Musburger and Jim Kaat later called Games 1-2 of the 1995 American League Championship Series, while the rest of the games were called by Bob Costas and Bob Uecker on NBC.

=== College football ===
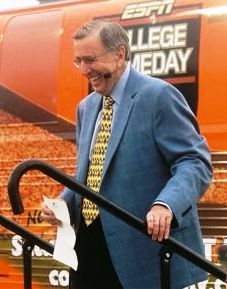
Brent Musburger departs the College GameDay bus in Austin, Texas, in 2006

Musburger's college football duties for ESPN and ABC included calling seven BCS National Championship games (2000, 2004, 2010, 2011, 2012, 2013, and 2014).

Beginning in 2006, Musburger called play-by-play for ABC's Saturday Night Football, along with analysts Bob Davie and Kirk Herbstreit. Musburger called the 2007 Rose Bowl, taking over for the retired Keith Jackson. He also called games on ESPN during his time at ABC.

During the 2013 BCS National Championship Game between Alabama and Notre Dame, a camera turned to Katherine Webb, who was in the stands cheering for her boyfriend, Alabama quarterback, A. J. McCarron. Musburger remarked, "I'm telling you, you quarterbacks get all the good-looking women. What a beautiful woman. Wow!" and continued commenting in a similar fashion. The next day, ESPN apologized for his comments, saying they "went too far". The controversy died down quickly afterwards, largely due to Webb stating that she was not bothered at all by Musburger's comments. As the Raiders' new radio broadcaster in 2018, Musburger jokingly revisited the incident with a Twitter post welcoming the now-married McCarrons to Oakland after the Raiders acquired AJ from the Buffalo Bills.

Musburger's involvement with Saturday Night Football concluded when he and Jesse Palmer were named ESPN's lead game commentators for college football coverage on the SEC Network in 2014. Musburger nevertheless called some games on ESPN and ABC after that time.

== VSIN, Oakland/Las Vegas Raiders (2018–2021) ==
At the 2017 Sugar Bowl, held in early January, Musburger made controversial comments about then-University of Oklahoma running back Joe Mixon. Mixon had previously punched and broken a woman's jaw.

Later in the same month, Musburger announced that he would retire from play-by-play broadcasting and would call his final game at Rupp Arena in Lexington, Kentucky, on January 31, 2017.

Musburger stated he planned to help his family get a sports handicapping business started in Las Vegas, have a sports gambling show on SiriusXM Radio, and enjoy personal travel. The new venture, Vegas Stats & Information Network (VSiN) is the first multichannel network dedicated to sports gambling information and is broadcast from a custom-built studio at the South Point Hotel, Casino & Spa. Musburger serves as managing editor of the network, and hosts its program My Guys in the Desert (a reference to his sly mentions of events of interest to bookmakers during his play-by-play). Musburger and his sons sold VSiN to DraftKings in March 2021 while remaining executives and on-air personalities with the network; DraftKings sold VSiN back to the Musburgers in 2024.

On July 17, 2018, it was reported that Musburger would be making his return to the broadcast booth, this time as the new radio voice for the Oakland Raiders under a three-year contract (which included its inaugural season in Las Vegas in 2020), succeeding Greg Papa. Musburger continued as announcer through the 2021 season.

Musburger made a special appearance at the 2025 Pro Football Hall of Fame Game as part of the NBC broadcast team, to commemorate Musburger's receiving the Pete Rozelle Radio-Television Award from the Hall of Fame that year. On September 21, 2025, Musburger made a guest appearance on The NFL Today as part of a special edition commemorating the program's 50th anniversary.

== Style ==
Musburger has a down-to-earth manner of speaking, often addressing his viewers as "folks". In a Sports Illustrated profile done on Musburger in January 1984, he stressed his hesitance to "pontificate" during his broadcasts. In 2004, CNN Sports Illustrated's Stewart Mandel selected him as the second-best college football announcer, behind Ron Franklin. Mandel said of Musburger, "His voice will always be associated with some of the sport's most memorable, modern moments."

Musburger has a reputation for pointing out attractive women in the crowds of the games he calls; among those who later rose to fame include Susan “Busty Heart” Sykes, CJ Perry, Jenn Sterger, and Katherine Webb McCarron.

== Other media ==
Musburger was a reporter in Rocky II and had his role immortalized in a 2006 action figure. He also played the right leg of the fictional monster Scuzzlebutt on an episode of South Park. He also made cameo appearances in The Main Event and The Waterboy. In Cars 2 and Planes, he played Brent Mustangburger, a fictionalized version of himself. He appeared as himself in the episode "Lying Around" on the ABC sitcom Happy Endings.

Musburger is portrayed by John Dellaporta and has a voice cameo as himself in the HBO series Winning Time: The Rise of the Lakers Dynasty. He was also parodied by Kevin Nealon on Saturday Night Live.

Preceded by Keith Jackson	Lead play-by-play announcer, ABC College Football; 2003	Succeeded by Brad Nessler
Preceded by Keith Jackson	Lead play-by-play announcer, ABC College Football; 1999–2001	Succeeded by Keith Jackson
Preceded by Pat Summerall	Play-by-play announcer, NBA Finals; 1975–1980	Succeeded by Gary Bender
Preceded by Jack Whitaker	The NFL Today host 1975–1989	Succeeded by Greg Gumbel
Preceded by Bryant Gumbel	Studio host, NCAA Men's Basketball Final Four; 1982–1984	Succeeded by Dick Stockton
Preceded by Gary Bender	Play-by-play announcer, NCAA Men's Basketball Final Four; 1985–1990	Succeeded by Jim Nantz
Preceded by None	Studio host, Monday Night Football; 1990–1995	Succeeded by Chris Berman
Preceded by Jim McKay; Terry Gannon	U.S. World Cup television studio host 1998; 2006	Succeeded by Terry Gannon; Chris Fowler
Preceded by Terry Gannon	Lead play-by-play, Little League World Series; 2000–2011	Succeeded by Karl Ravech
Preceded by none	ABC Saturday Night Football play-by-play announcer 2006–2013	Succeeded by Chris Fowler
Preceded by Keith Jackson	Television play-by-play announcer, Rose Bowl; 2007–2014	Succeeded by Chris Fowler
Preceded by Thom Brennaman	Television play-by-play announcer, BCS National Championship Game; 2010–2014	Succeeded by BCS defunct
Preceded by Gary Thorne (in 1989)	#2 play-by-play announcer, Major League Baseball on ABC; 1994–1995	Succeeded by Last
Preceded by Joe McConnell	National radio play-by-play announcer, NBA Finals; 1996–2004	Succeeded by Jim Durham
