= Kenan Harkin =

American BMX rider (born 1974)

- Kenan Harkin in 2025
- Born: June 13, 1974 (age 52); Long Island, New York
- Occupations: BMX rider, television personality, reptile rehabilitator

Kenan Harkin (born June 13, 1974) is an American former professional BMX rider, television personality, and wildlife rehabilitator. He is known for having worked as a color commentator and sideline reporter for numerous events, having worked at the Rockstar US Open, the Gravity Games, the Dew Tour, the Vans Triple Crown series, and the BMX events at the 2008 Summer Olympics.

Harkin operates an exotic reptile rehabilitation, breeding, and education center in Florida formerly known as Kamp Kenan.
