= Todd Musburger =

American attorney/talent agent

Todd W. Musburger is a Chicago-based attorney and talent agent specializing in media, sports, and entertainment law. Since 1980 he has operated his own firm, Todd W. Musburger Ltd., which concentrates in representing individuals in the fields of television, radio, film, publishing and music.

Musburger is a graduate of the DePaul University College of Law. He famously represented Phil Jackson during his championship years with the Chicago Bulls and his acrimonious negotiations with Bulls' management. Musburger also represents his brother Brent who is a long time sports broadcaster who was with ABC/ESPN when he retired January 31, 2017, and with him, co-founded the Vegas Stats & Information Network. DraftKings purchased VSiN in 2021, with Todd continuing to hold an executive role.
