= Catherine Meusburger =

Austrian mathematician and physicist

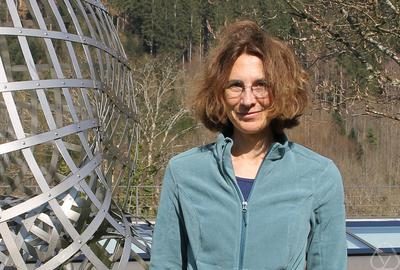
- Meusburger at Oberwolfach in 2026
- Born: 7 January 1978 (age 48); Innsbruck, Austria
- Education: University of Freiburg; Heriot-Watt University
- Scientific career
- Fields: Mathematical physics
- Workplaces: University of Erlangen-Nuremberg
- Doctoral advisor: Bernd Schroers

Catherine Meusburger (born 7 January 1978) is an Austrian mathematician and physicist. She works at the interface between mathematical physics, algebra and geometry. Since 2011 she has served as professor of mathematics at the University of Erlangen-Nuremberg.

Her research interests include 3D geometry, quantization of moduli spaces of flat connections, higher categories, topological quantum field theories, the mapping class group, and topological models in condensed matter physics. Earlier work was on the quantization of Chern-Simons theory and 3D gravity.

== Biography ==
Meusburger was born in Innsbruck, Austria and grew up in Heidelberg, Germany, where she graduated from Kurfürst-Friedrich-Gymnasium. She then went on to study physics at the University of Freiburg from 1996 to 2001, where she wrote the thesis The Quantisation of the algebra of invariants of the closed bosonic Nambu–Goto String using a concrete realization, for which she won the Gustav-Mies Prize 2002 for best thesis, and graduated with distinction. Two months later she was at the Heriot-Watt University in Edinburgh to work on her PhD in the department of mathematics under supervision of Bernd Schroers; her thesis was titled Phase space and quantisation of (2+1)-dimensional gravity in the Chern–Simons formulation.

Between 2004 and 2008, she worked as a postdoc at the Perimeter Institute in Canada. After a half-year stay at the University of Nottingham as a Marie Curie Intra-European Research Fellow, she led a Emmy-Noether Junior Research Group at the University of Hamburg until 2011.
