= Brian Drebber =

American sports commentator (1950–2018)

- Born: July 27, 1950; Guam, Mariana Islands
- Died: August 23, 2018 (aged 68); Canton, Georgia, U.S.
- Occupation: Sportscaster
- Employer: Speed

Brian Drebber (July 27, 1950 – August 23, 2018) was an American sports commentator who was employed by the television network Speed before his death in August 2018.

== Career ==
Drebber was born in Guam, Mariana Islands. Since 1978, he was a play-by-play, analyst, reporter, writer, and producer, covering eight Olympic, Pan American and Goodwill Games as well as world championships in 25 different sports including, aerobics, drag boat racing, curling, cycling, and Nordic events, for TNT, ESPN, ABC, CBS, and PBS.

He last broadcast AMA Superbike Championship, ARCA RE/MAX Series Racing, USAR Hooters Pro Cup, and Bike Week for Speed.

Drebber got his start as a broadcaster and sports reporter by providing commentary over the public address system at the Trexlertown Velodrome in the mid-1970s. As a rider there, his nickname was "Dribbles". It was soon discovered that he was a far better announcer than rider and his announcing style quickly became very popular at Trexlertown, because he knew the sport and the riders very well and had a keen sense of humor.

== Death ==
Drebber died on August 23, 2018, in Canton, Georgia, en route to the airport, when his motorcycle struck a deer. He was 68. He was engaged to fiancée Mara Yetter and had a daughter Robin Drebber and granddaughter Kylie von Drebber as well as sister Donna.
