= Adrian Karsten =

American sports announcer (1960–2005)

- Born: March 13, 1960; Horicon, Wisconsin, U.S.
- Died: September 2, 2005 (aged 45); Green Lake, Wisconsin, U.S.
- Education: Northwestern University
- Occupation: Sports reporter
- Years active: 1991–2003
- Employer: ESPN

Adrian Kennedy Karsten (March 13, 1960 – September 2, 2005) was an American sports reporter, best known for his work as a college football sideline reporter for ESPN. He was also known for wearing his trademark suspenders.

== Reporting career ==
Karsten was born in Horicon, Wisconsin, and graduated from Horicon High School in 1978. He attended Northwestern University and graduated in 1982. He was a member of the Sigma Chi fraternity.

ESPN hired Karsten as a production assistant in 1983 and he began reporting in 1991. He was mainly known for being a college football sideline reporter. Karsten was known in the cycling community for his 'side-line' style reporting while anchoring during ESPN's broadcasts of the Tour de France. Karsten hosted the Tour de France from 1994 through 2000—more than any other American host. ESPN fired him in 2003 for alcohol dependence.

== Legal issues and death ==
In July 2005, Karsten pleaded guilty to not reporting $607,000 that he made between 1999 and 2002 for his work at ESPN. Karsten was sentenced to eleven months in prison and nine months of confinement at his home for tax evasion. He never showed up at a Federal prison in Rochester, Minnesota. On September 2, 2005, he committed suicide by hanging himself in his garage in Green Lake, Wisconsin, just before he was scheduled to report to prison.
