= Craig Hummer =

American sports announcer (born 1965)

- Born: May 20, 1965 (age 61); Akron, Ohio, U.S.
- Education: Kenyon College
- Occupation: Sportscaster
- Spouse: Jennifer Gooch Hummer
- Children: 3

Craig B. Hummer (born May 20, 1965) is an American sportscaster. He is best known for his coverage of the Tour de France, Olympic Games, and Professional Bull Riders (PBR) events. Hummer is a former competitive ocean swimmer and lifeguard. He won 39 national championship titles, including seven years as International Ironman.

== Early life and education ==
Hummer was born in Akron, Ohio, on May 20, 1965. He was a swimmer at Thomas Worthington High School, where he swam All-American times in three events. He received an academic scholarship to attend Kenyon College, and earned 17 All-American titles in the school's NCAA Division III program. He went on to become a surf racer.

== Career ==
=== Swimming ===
After graduation, Hummer applied to be a Los Angeles County lifeguard. In 1987, he won his first national title at a lifeguard competition in Hawaii. In 1988, he made the U.S. team that traveled to the World Championships in Australia. In 1989, Hummer was the U.S. Ocean Ironman Champion for the first time. He has been the U.S. Ocean Ironman Champion seven times. starting in 1989.

In 1990, he participated in a single race for the Uncle Toby's Super Series, which was held in Hawaii, and was invited to compete in the series in Australia. That same year, he won the three-day United States Lifesaving Association (USLA). Also that same year, he went to Australia to participate in Uncle Toby's Super Series where top ranked lifeguards travel the continent competing. Hummer was the first American invited to participate in this event. He competed annually in Australia for four years, and was voted Most Improved in 1993. In his last year participating in Uncle Toby's Super Series, he took 9th place.

He won the USLA championship again in 1991, and in 1992, he won seven events at the U.S. Lifesaving Association National Championships, and eight events in 1993.

Hummer won six consecutive series title in the Bud Light Ocean Festival Series.

He finished second in the Outrigger's Waikiki King's Race, part of Outrigger Hotel's Hawaiian OceanFest, in 1991. He won the competition the next four consecutive years. He also won the U.S. Surf Lifesaving Championship six times.

Hummer was emcee of the National Lifeguard Championships in 1996. In 1997, he hosted the Wakiki King's race and was a commentator on the Fox Sports' Association of Volleyball Professionals series. He also commentated the Oceanman World Tour.

He has appeared on Family Feud with the Los Angeles County Lifeguards. Hummer has also done ads for Gatorade, Carl's Jr., Ford, and Dr. Pepper. He has also appeared on Baywatch, Late Show with David Letterman, The Golden Girls. and NBC's Today Show.

=== Broadcasting ===
Hummer has commentated on over 40 different sports. He first pursued a broadcasting career in 1996. He briefly worked for TVG Network, a horse racing network.

Hummer became part of the Universal Sports Network when it was still the World Championship Sports Network. In 2003, he worked on the series Global Extremes for OLN. The Global Extremes finale followed a group of climbers scaling Mount Everest.

In 2007, Hummer joined the CBS Sports' Tour de France announce team. Additionally, he has worked with PBR bull riding television coverage since 2005. In 2007, he covered the 32nd America's Cup sailing competition in Valencia, Spain. In 2010, Hummer was host of the daily news segments for Universal Sports' Vancouver Olympic Games coverage. He was an announcer on the Las Vegas Super Sprint in 2014, and became the announcer for La Course, a woman's race produced by Le Tour de France. That same year he was MC of the Tour de Pier, a fundraiser for cancer research featuring over 300 stationary bikes on the Manhattan Beach Pier. Hummer has also done interviews and announcing for World Extreme Cagefighting and UFC 55.

== Other activities ==
Hummer co-authored The Loyal Lieutenant: Leading Out Lance and Pushing Through the Pain on the Rocky Road to Paris with George Hincapie. The book was ranked third on the New York Times Best Sellers list under sports books in June 2014. Hummer also interviewed George Hincapie for the George Hincapie: The Loyal Lieutenant interview presented by the Universal Sports Network in 2014.
