= Phil Liggett =

Cycling commentator (born 1943)

Phil Liggett MBE
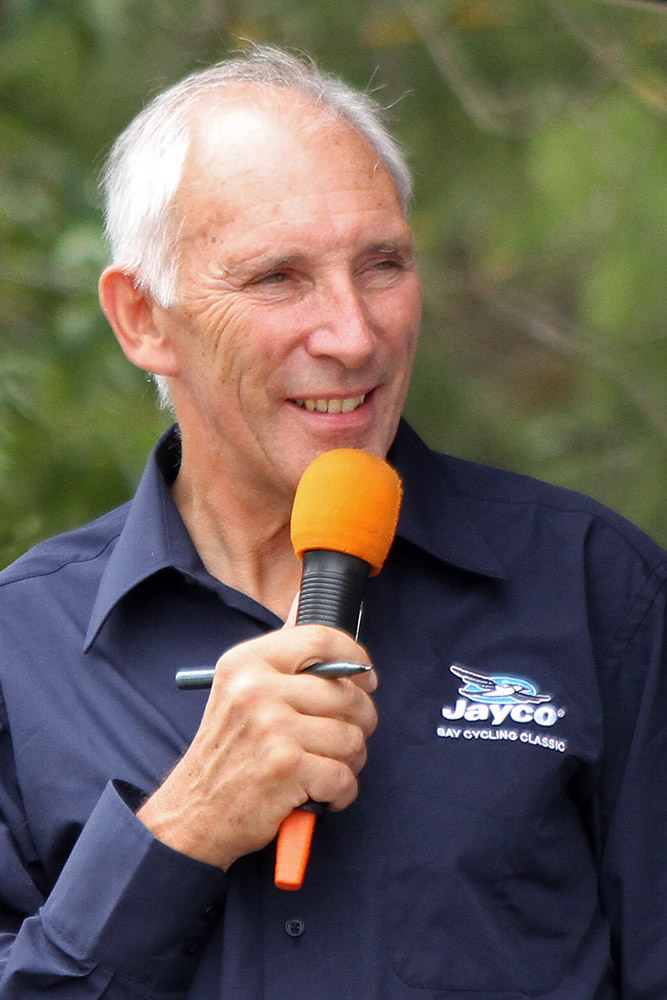
- Commentating at the 2010 Bay Cycling Classic
- Born: 11 August 1943 (age 83); Bebington, Merseyside, England, UK
- Occupations: Cycling commentator and journalist
- Years active: 1967–present
- Employer(s): NBC Sports (US); SBS (Australia) (—2016)

Philip Alexander Liggett MBE (born 11 August 1943) is an English commentator, former amateur cyclist, and journalist who covers professional cycling.

He currently commentates on the Tour de France and bike races for NBC Sports, and was previously associated with Australia's SBS. He is a former amateur cyclist and received a professional contract in 1967; instead of turning professional, he saw a future in sports journalism after writing articles in cycling magazines about races in which he participated.

== Journalism ==
Liggett initially wrote for Cycling magazine, and moved on to do freelance work for The Guardian, The Daily Telegraph and The Observer. In 1997, he was appointed Cycle Sport magazine's international editor. He has also written books on cycle racing.

Liggett has reported on 17 Olympic Games and 52 Tours de France, generally alongside fellow veteran cycling commentators and former cyclists Paul Sherwen (UK) and Bob Roll (US). Liggett has covered other sports including triathlons and ski jumping. Because of his varied assignments, Liggett has worked for all of the American Big Three networks: ABC, CBS, and NBC. Liggett announced his retirement from commentating Olympics during the 2024 Olympics, with the 2024 Games being his last.

Liggett has also been associated with the Australian network SBS covering Australian events such as the Tour Down Under in addition to the Tour de France. In 2010, he covered Johannesburg's 94.7 Cycle Challenge for South Africa's SuperSport. Liggett also commentated for London 2012 with Australian broadcaster Foxtel.

Liggett, along with Anna Meares and Robbie McEwen, co-hosted the Seven Network broadcast of the 2023 & 2024 Santos Men's Tour Down Under used by Peacock in the US.

== Cycling ==
Between 1972 and 1993, Liggett was technical director of the Milk Race. His involvement with organising cycle racing events led to his becoming vice-president of the Association Internationale Organisateurs des Courses Cycliste. In 1973, age 30, Liggett became the youngest ever UCI international commissaire.

Liggett has been president of the Cyclists' Touring Club (CTC), Britain's national cyclists' organisation.

In 2009, he was inducted into the British Cycling Hall of Fame.

== Defence of Lance Armstrong ==
Liggett was a long-time supporter of Lance Armstrong and was a regular speaker at "Livestrong" functions along with his Tour de France co-presenter Paul Sherwen. He repeatedly defended Armstrong, challenging the investigations which he called "a waste of money". When Floyd Landis tested positive at the 2006 Tour de France, Liggett denigrated the verdict, saying: "The fact that the lab knew whose sample it was testing is just one of the anomalies", but when Landis admitted to doping in 2010 and implicated Armstrong, Liggett dismissed it as "sour grapes" and called the accusations "ridiculous". He also stated that UCI President Pat McQuaid was "vehemently anti-doping."

In 2012, after the United States Anti-Doping Agency (USADA) had stripped Armstrong of his Tour de France titles, Liggett claimed on South African radio to have proof that unnamed politicians motivated by jealousy had fabricated the evidence against Armstrong by bribing witnesses. This provoked an angry response from USADA, who dismissed his claims, and a comprehensive, point-by-point rebuttal by Michael Ashenden, a leading doping expert. In October 2012, Liggett maintained his defence of Armstrong, calling the investigation a "witch hunt" without evidence. Later that month, in a documentary by ABC's Four Corners entitled "The World According to Lance", he stated that he now found it difficult to believe that Armstrong had never doped and that he was disappointed that Armstrong had lied to him in 2003 when asked about doping.

== Personal life ==
In 2005, Liggett was appointed a Member of the Order of the British Empire (MBE) for services to cycling.

== Books ==
- Tour De France for Dummies by Phil Liggett, James Raia, Sammarye Lewis and Lance Armstrong (27 May 2005)
- Tour de France 1988 by Phil Liggett (May 1988)
- Fastest Man on Wheels. In Pursuit of Chris Boardman by Phil Liggett (May 1994)
- Dancing on the Pedals: The Found Poetry of Phil Liggett, the Voice of Cycling by Phil Liggett and Doug Donaldson (Editor)
