= History of Major League Baseball on NBC =

The following article details the history of Major League Baseball on NBC, the broadcast of Major League Baseball games on the NBC television network.

== Early years ==
=== 1930s ===
NBC's television coverage and relationship with Major League Baseball technically dates back to August 26, 1939. It was on that date that on W2XBS (an experimental television station in New York City which would ultimately become what is now NBC's flagship television station, WNBC), the first-ever Major League Baseball game was televised. With Red Barber announcing, the Brooklyn Dodgers and the Cincinnati Reds played a doubleheader at Ebbets Field. The Reds won the first game 5–2 while the Dodgers won the second, 6–1. Barber called the game without the benefit of a monitor and with only two cameras capturing the game. One camera was on Barber and the other was behind the plate. Barber had to guess from which light was on and where it pointed.

=== 1940s ===
By 1947, television sets, most with five and seven-inch screens, were selling almost as fast as they could be produced. Because of this, Major League teams began televising games and attracted a whole new audience into ballparks in the process. People who had only casually followed baseball began going to the games in person. In 1948, Major League Baseball's total attendance reached a record high of 21 million.

1947 also saw the first televised World Series. The games were broadcast in the New York City area by NBC's WNBT, CBS's WCBS-TV and DuMont's WABD and sponsored by Gillette and Ford. The 1947 World Series brought in an estimated 3.9 million viewers, becoming television's first mass audience. In addition to New York City, live coverage of the Series was also seen on WRGB in Schenectady/Albany (now a CBS affiliate), WPTZ (now CBS-owned KYW-TV) in Philadelphia, WMAR-TV in Baltimore and WTTG in Washington, D.C.

In 1948 and 1949, the World Series would be carried on the aforementioned stations, as well as on WBZ-TV and WNAC-TV (now WHDH-TV) in Boston, WNHC-TV (now WTNH) in New Haven and WTVR-TV in Richmond, Virginia. In 1949, the World Series was also seen live in other Northeastern and Midwestern cities (Harrisburg, Pittsburgh, Syracuse, Rochester, Buffalo, Erie, Cleveland, Detroit, Columbus, Cincinnati, Dayton, Toledo, Indianapolis, Chicago, Milwaukee and St. Louis) that had been hooked up to network lines over the previous year.

=== 1950s ===
In 1950, the Mutual Broadcasting System acquired the television as well as radio broadcast rights to the World Series and All-Star Game for the next six years. Mutual may have been reindulging in dreams of becoming a television network or simply taking advantage of a long-standing business relationship; in either case, the broadcast rights were sold to NBC in time for the following season's games at an enormous profit.

By 1950, World Series games could be seen in most of the country, but not all. 1950 also marked the first time that there was an exclusive network television broadcaster (NBC). West Coast viewers finally saw live major league games on television during the 1951 postseason.

NBC aired the second and third games of the 1951 National League tie-breaker series between the Brooklyn Dodgers and New York Giants, necessitated by the teams' finishing the regular season in a tie for first place. The three-game pennant playoff, which featured the first baseball games televised live from coast to coast (with CBS airing the first game), culminated on October 3 when the Giants won the third and deciding game by the score of 5–4 (off Bobby Thomson's home run). Ernie Harwell called the game for Giants television flagship WPIX – the independent station's broadcast was simulcast nationally by NBC – and his description of the home run was a simple shout of "It's gone!" almost at the moment Thomson's bat struck Ralph Branca's pitch. Harwell later admitted he had probably called it "too soon", but fortunately for him, the call proved to be correct. "And then", Harwell recalled, "the pictures took over."

The 1951 playoff between Brooklyn and the New York Giants and that year's World Series were the first major league baseball games telecast live from coast-to-coast to coast; transcontinental network transmission lines had been completed and activated in September, in-time for the Japanese Peace Treaty Conference in San Francisco and the start of the 1951–52 television season.

The 1952 All-Star Game at Shibe Park in Philadelphia was the first nationally televised All-Star Game, but it was shortened due to rain.

On January 31, 1953, the New York Yankees, Cleveland Indians and Boston Red Sox joined forces against St. Louis Browns owner Bill Veeck. The respective franchises tried to force the Browns to play afternoon games in an attempt to avoid having to share television revenues. A month later, Major League Baseball owners received a warning from Senator Edwin Johnson about nationally televising their games. Johnson's theory was that nationally televising baseball games would be a threat to the survival of minor league baseball. The owners ignored Johnson, as the games on NBC were gaining a large and loyal following.

Another first for NBC during this period was the first color telecast of a World Series, the 1955 matchup between the Brooklyn Dodgers and the New York Yankees.

Chicago White Sox announcer Bob Elson missed a chance to call the 1959 World Series – the White Sox' first since 1919, and Elson's first since 1943 – on NBC because the then head of NBC Sports, Tom Gallery (who incidentally, grew up on the same block as Elson) did not like him. Elson was, however, allowed to call the Series on the White Sox' radio flagship, WCFL.

== NBC begins airing the Game of the Week (1957–65) ==
In 1957, NBC started airing weekend Game of the Week telecasts (Sunday telecasts were added in 1959) with Lindsey Nelson and Leo Durocher calling the action. During this period, NBC (as rival CBS had the rights to broadcast at least eight teams) typically broadcast from Pittsburgh's Forbes Field, Chicago's Wrigley Field or Milwaukee's County Stadium. NBC purchased the rights to 11 Milwaukee Braves games, 11 Pittsburgh Pirates games, two Washington Senators games, and two Chicago Cubs games. Leo Durocher was succeeded as color commentator by Fred Haney in 1960, and Joe Garagiola in 1961, while Bob Wolff replaced Nelson on play-by-play in 1962.

From 1958 to 1960, NBC aired a special regional feed of its games in the southeast, where the network had a different sponsor (such as National Bohemian beer) than for the rest of the country. This feed featured its own announcing team, with Chuck Thompson calling the games with Bill Veeck (1958) and Al Rosen (1959–60). NBC never had a true backup game until 1966, when the network got exclusivity for the Game of the Week. In the process, NBC brought in Curt Gowdy and Pee Wee Reese for the primary game, and Jim Simpson and Tony Kubek for the alternate game (which was always shown in the markets of teams playing in the primary game).

=== 1960–65 ===
As previously mentioned, in 1961, NBC hired Joe Garagiola to be their Major League Baseball color commentator. The following year, Bob Wolff began working play-by-play. "You work your side of the street [interviewing players]", said Garagiola to Wolff "and I'll work mine." Wolff liked Garagiola's pizazz as he would say things like "the guy stapled him to the bag" or that a runner is "smilin' like he swallowed a banana peel." Also in 1962, NBC broadcast the National League tie-breaker series between the San Francisco Giants and Los Angeles Dodgers. Bob Wolff and George Kell were the announcers for the playoff series. Wolff also hosted the pre-game shows for NBC's World Series coverage from 1962 to 1965.

Prior to the mid-1970s, television networks and stations generally did not preserve telecasts of sporting events, choosing instead to tape over them. As a result, the broadcasts of six of the seven 1960 World Series games are no longer known to exist. The lone exception is a black-and-white kinescope of the entire telecast of Game 7, which was discovered in a wine cellar in Bing Crosby's home in Hillsborough, California in December 2009. A part-owner of the Pittsburgh Pirates, who was too superstitious to watch the Series live, Crosby listened to the decisive contest with his wife Kathryn and two friends on a shortwave radio in Paris, France. Wanting to watch the game at a later date only if the Pirates won, he arranged for a company to record it. After viewing the kinescope, he placed it in his wine cellar, where it went untouched for 49 years. It was finally found by Robert Bader, vice president of marketing and production for Bing Crosby Enterprises, while looking through videotapes of Crosby's television specials which were to be transferred to DVD. The five-reel set is the only known complete copy of the historic match, which was originally broadcast in color. The NBC television announcers for the Series were Bob Prince and Mel Allen, the respective primary play-by-play voices for the Pirates and New York Yankees. Prince called the first half of Game 7, while Allen did the latter portion.

In contrast to preceding years, where NBC's World Series telecasts featured two announcers (usually one from each participating team) who split the play-by-play duties, each working his portion of the game by himself, in 1961, the network had Yankees announcer Mel Allen handle all of the play-by-play on television (with Reds announcer Waite Hoyt confined to radio) while Joe Garagiola provided color commentary. This format would eventually become the standard form of presentation on World Series telecasts. In Week 3 of the 1961 National Football League season, the Baltimore-Green Bay game was televised locally to Baltimore over NBC affiliate WBAL-TV. Apparently if Baltimore viewers wanted to see the World Series, they would have had to choose between NBC-owned WRC-TV in Washington or affiliate WGAL-TV in Lancaster, Pennsylvania. There was no NFL telecast on NBC (who at the time broadcast Pittsburgh Steelers and Colts games) due to coverage of Game 4 of the World Series.

On July 13, 1963, NBC's coverage of the Detroit Tigers–Chicago White Sox game from Comiskey Park in Chicago was carried by KCRA-TV in Sacramento, KCRL in Reno and KVIP-TV in Redding – however it was not televised in the San Francisco market on KRON-TV. NBC's coverage of the Cleveland Indians-Tigers game at 11:30 a.m. the following day was also not broadcast by KRON.

During the fourth and final game of the 1963 World Series, Yankees announcer Mel Allen was calling the top of the ninth inning for NBC when his voice gave out due to a bout of severe laryngitis, forcing Dodgers announcer Vin Scully (who had called the first four-and-a-half innings of the game per the network's usual setup) to resume play-by-play duties for the remainder of the game. After the Series New York Daily News sportswriter Dick Young opined that Allen, the voice of the Yankees, had been stricken by "psychosomatic laryngitis" caused by his team being swept.

By 1964, CBS' Dizzy Dean and Pee Wee Reese called games from Yankee Stadium, Wrigley Field, St. Louis, Philadelphia and Baltimore. New York got a US$550,000 payment of CBS' $895,000. Meanwhile, six clubs that exclusively played nationally televised games on NBC were paid $1.2 million.

Also in 1964, the New York Yankees made the World Series for the 15th time in 18 years – however Mel Allen was not there. In September of that year, before the end of the season, the Yankees informed Allen that his contract with the team would not be renewed. In those days, the main announcers for the Series participants always called the World Series on NBC. Although Allen was therefore technically eligible to call the Series, Baseball Commissioner Ford C. Frick honored the Yankees' request to have Phil Rizzuto join the Series crew instead. It was the first time Allen had missed a World Series for which the Yankees were eligible since 1943, and only the second World Series (not counting those missed during World War II) that he had missed since he began calling baseball games in 1938. On December 17, after much media speculation and many letters to the Yankees from fans disgruntled at Allen's absence from the Series, the Yankees issued a terse press release announcing Allen's firing; he was replaced by Joe Garagiola. NBC and Movietone dropped him soon afterward.

To this day, the Yankees have never given an explanation for Allen's sudden firing, and rumors abounded. Depending on the rumor, Allen was either homosexual, an alcoholic, a drug addict or had a nervous breakdown. Allen's sexuality was sometimes a target in those more conservative days because he had not married (and never did). Years later, Allen told author Curt Smith that the Yankees had fired him under pressure from the team's longtime sponsor, Ballantine Beer. According to Allen, he was fired as a cost-cutting move by Ballantine, which had been experiencing poor sales for years (it would eventually be sold in 1969). Smith, in his book Voices of Summer, also indicated that the medications Allen took in order to maintain his busy schedule may have affected his on-air performance (Stephen Borelli, another biographer, has also pointed out that Allen's heavy workload did not allow him time to take care of his health).

In 1965, ABC brought forth such innovations like isolated instant replay, field microphones, and a separate camera for each base runner. After ABC's contract for the Game of the Week expired after a single season, NBC felt compelled to dramatically alter their own baseball coverage. So for NBC's coverage of the 1965 World Series, it featured videotaped replays, prerecorded audio analysis from key players, and enhanced animated graphics.

== The Game of the Week exclusivity era (1966–89) ==
Until 1965 (when Major League Baseball made its first ever, league-wide regular-season network television deal with ABC), there was no league-wide national television package for regular season Major League Baseball games. As a result, teams, if they so desired, could sell the rights to the networks. Also prior to 1965, regular season Major League Baseball telecasts broadcast by networks had to be blacked-out in cities with league franchises. More to the point, by around the year prior, thanks to expansion (in 1960 and 1961), regular season MLB games shown on network television were blacked out in most major markets. However, the network Games of the Week, up until the late 1980s, still could not be seen in the two cities whose local teams were playing in each respective game.

From 1965 until the late 1980s, networks would cover two Saturday afternoon games each week: one that went to most of the network (a "primary game"), and the second being seen only in the home markets of the two teams playing in the network's "primary" game. Although the "primary" game would not be televised in each team's home markets, local television rights-holders in those cities were free to broadcast that game. The manner that this worked allowed, for instance, a network's two Saturday afternoon Games of the Week involving the New York Yankees at the Boston Red Sox serving as the primary game and St. Louis Cardinals at the Chicago Cubs being the secondary game. The Yankees-Red Sox game would as a result, be seen everywhere except in New York City, Boston and possibly markets adjacent to those cities. Ultimately, those markets got the Cardinals-Cubs game instead.

=== 1960s ===
The New York Yankees, which, the year before, had played 21 Games of the Week for CBS, joined NBC's package in 1966. The new package under NBC called for 28 games, as compared to the 123 combined among three networks during the 1960s. On October 19, 1965, NBC signed a three-year contract with Major League Baseball. As previously mentioned, the year before, Major League Baseball sold an exclusive league-wide television package for the rights to the Saturday-Sunday Game of the Week to ABC. NBC covered only the All-Star Game and World Series in 1965. In addition, a previous deal limited CBS to covering only twelve weekends when its new subsidiary, the New York Yankees, played at home. As previously mentioned, before 1965, NBC aired a slate of Saturday afternoon games beginning in 1957.

Under the new deal, NBC paid roughly US$6 million per year for the 25 Games of the Week, $6.1 million for the 1967 World Series and All-Star Game, and $6.5 million for the 1968 World Series and 1968 All-Star Game. This brought the total value of the contract (which included three Monday night telecasts such as a Labor Day 1966 contest between the San Francisco Giants and Los Angeles Dodgers) up to $30.6 million.

On April 16, 1966, in New York City, about 50 baseball, network, and advertising officials discussed NBC's first year with the Game of the Week. New York could not get a primary match-up between the Detroit Tigers and New York Yankees with Curt Gowdy and Pee Wee Reese calling the action because of local blackout rules. Instead, that market received a backup game (or "'B' game") featuring Tony Kubek and Jim Simpson calling a game between the Cincinnati Reds and Chicago Cubs. That rule would be eliminated after the 1983 season.

In replacing CBS, NBC traded a circus for a seminar. Reese said "Curt Gowdy was its guy (1966–75), and didn't want Dizzy Dean – too overpowering. Curt was nice, but worried about mistakes. Diz and I just laughed." Falstaff Brewery hyped Dean as Gowdy in return said "I said, 'I can't do "Wabash Cannonball." Our styles clash --" then came Pee Wee Reese. Gowdy added by saying about the pairing between him and Reese, "They figured he was fine with me, and they'd still have their boy." To many, baseball meant CBS's 1955–64 Game of the Week thoroughbred. A year later, NBC bought ABC's variant of a mule so to speak. "We had the Series and All-Star Game. 1966–1968's Game meant exclusivity", said NBC Sports head Carl Lindemann, who added that "[Colleague] Chet Simmons and liked him [Gowdy] with the Sox and football" also, getting two network sports for the price of one. As his analyst, Gowdy wanted his friend Ted Williams. NBC's lead sponsor, Chrysler declined the idea when Williams, a Sears spokesman, was pictured putting stuff in a Ford truck.

Before 1966, local announcers exclusively called the World Series. Typically, the Gillette Company, the Commissioner of Baseball and NBC television would choose the announcers, who would represent each of the teams that were in the World Series for the respective year. For the 1966 World Series, Curt Gowdy called half of each game before ceding the microphone to Vin Scully in Los Angeles, and Chuck Thompson in Baltimore. Scully was not satisfied with the arrangement as he said "What about the road? My fans won't be able to hear me." In Game 1 of the 1966 World Series, Scully called the first 4½ innings. When Gowdy inherited the announcing reins, Scully was so upset that he refused to say another word.

As previously mentioned, before 1966, NBC typically paired the top announcers for the respective World Series teams to alternate play-by-play during each game's telecast. For example, if the Yankees played the Dodgers in the World Series, Mel Allen (representing the Yankees) would call half the game and Vin Scully (representing the Dodgers) would call the rest of the game. However, in 1966, NBC wanted its regular network announcer, Curt Gowdy, to call most of the play-by-play at the expense of the top local announcers. So instead of calling half of every World Series game on television (as Vin Scully had done in 1953, 1955, 1956, 1959, 1963 and 1965) they only get to call half of all home games on TV, providing color commentary while Gowdy called play-by-play for the rest each game. The visiting teams' announcers participated in the NBC Radio broadcasts. In broadcasts of Series-clinching (or potentially Series-clinching) games on both media, NBC sent the announcer for whichever team was ahead in the game to that team's clubhouse in the ninth inning in order to help cover the trophy presentation and conduct postgame interviews.

In 1967, main Game of the Week broadcasts were blacked-out in the cities of the two participating teams. In some cases, those games were aired by way of the teams' respective local flagship stations, with their local announcing crews – for example, the May 27, Dodgers–Giants contest in San Francisco was not carried by either KRON-TV in the originating city or KNBC in Los Angeles. The game was, however, telecast in Los Angeles over the Dodgers' flagship station KTTV, with Jerry Doggett and Vin Scully providing play-by-play. At the time, Dodgers' broadcasts over KTTV were limited to road games in San Francisco. Conversely the Giants' broadcast partner, KTVU, did not broadcast the team's home games in 1967. Viewers in the San Francisco Bay Area may have been able to view this game on one of two NBC affiliates from nearby areas, KSBW-TV in Salinas and KCRA-TV in Sacramento, California.

The 1967 All-Star Game in Anaheim can be considered the first "prime time" telecast of a Major League Baseball All-Star Game. The game started at approximately 7:00 p.m. on the East Coast. Sports Illustrated, noting that the game "began at 4 p.m. in California and ended at 11 p.m. Eastern Daylight Time," reported "an estimated 55 million people watched the game, compared with 12 million viewers for the 1966 All-Star Game, played in the afternoon." Buddy Blattner, broadcaster for the host California Angels, appeared briefly at the beginning of the NBC telecast to introduce viewers to Anaheim Stadium before moving to the NBC Radio booth for the game itself. Houston Astros announcer Gene Elston was used in the same role for the 1968 game at the Astrodome.

Week 4 of the 1967 AFL season coincided with the race for the American League pennant. NBC decided to focus on their baseball coverage instead of covering the early games; thus resulting in Curt Gowdy calling the Twins-Red Sox game; Jim Simpson calling the Angels-Tigers game); while the AFL schedule resulted in the two early games (Broncos-Oilers and Dolphins-Jets) not being televised with another Chargers-Bills game being a locally televised game airing only in San Diego on then-NBC affiliate KOGO (now ABC affiliate KGTV).

The June 8, 1968 Game of the Week broadcast was cancelled due to coverage of the funeral/burial of Robert F. Kennedy. Cleveland at Detroit and Atlanta at Chicago Cubs were the games scheduled to air on that date.

Tony Kubek initially had trouble adjusting to the world of broadcasting. Although he had a lot to say, he was gangling, he tended to stutter, and he talked too fast. Curt Gowdy soon suggested to Kubek that he should work in the off-season to improve his delivery. Kubek bought a tape recorder and took to reading poetry aloud for 20 minutes a day. In 1968, Kubek wowed as a World Series field reporter. Pee Wee Reese, who was soon fired by NBC (and replaced by Kubek as the top analyst) said of Kubek "He wormed his way around, but I wasn't bitter. I just think if you don't have anything to say, you should shut your mouth."

The 1969 All-Star Game was originally scheduled for the evening of Tuesday, July 22, but heavy rains forced its postponement to the following afternoon. The 1969 contest remains the last All-Star Game to date to be played earlier than prime time in the Eastern United States. Charlie Jones served as an "in-the-stands" reporter for NBC's coverage.

Games 3, 4, and 5 of the 1969 World Series are believed to be the oldest surviving color television broadcasts of World Series games (even though World Series telecasts have aired in color since 1955). However, they were "truck feeds" in that they do not contain the original commercials, but show a static image of the Shea Stadium field between innings. Games 1 and 2 were saved only as black-and-white kinescopes provided by the CBC. CBC also preserved all seven games of the 1965 and 1968 World Series (plus the 1968 All-Star Game) in black-and-white kinescope.

=== 1970s ===
==== 1970–75 ====
In 1970, NBC televised the second games of both League Championship Series on a regional basis. Some markets received the NLCS at 1:00 p.m. Eastern Time along with a 4:00 p.m. football game, while other markets got the ALCS at 4:00 p.m. along with a 1:00 p.m. football game.

In 1967, soon after his retirement as a player, Sandy Koufax signed a ten-year contract with NBC for $1 million to serve as a broadcaster on the Saturday Game of the Week. Koufax never felt comfortable being in front of the camera, and quit before the 1973 season.

Also in 1971, Game 1 of the ALCS was rained out on Saturday, October 2. NBC did not televise the rescheduled Game 1 the following day (the network had only planned an NLCS telecast that day), but added a telecast of Game 2 on Monday, October 4 (which had been a scheduled travel day). 1971 was the first year that the League Championship Series schedule contained travel days. Back then, for the most part, Major League Baseball did this whenever a west coast team (in this case, the San Francisco Giants and Oakland Athletics) was involved.

On October 13, 1971, the World Series held a night game for the very first time. Commissioner Bowie Kuhn, who felt that baseball could attract a larger audience by featuring a prime time telecast (as opposed to a mid-afternoon broadcast, occurring when most fans either worked or attended school), pitched the idea to NBC. An estimated 61 million people watched Game 4 on NBC; television ratings for a World Series game during the daytime hours would not have approached such a record number.

For World Series night games, NBC normally began baseball coverage at 8:00 p.m. Eastern Time with a pre-game show (with first pitch occurring around 8:20 to 8:25 p.m.). However, in 1986 and 1988, for Game 5 of the World Series (on Thursday night), NBC's coverage did not begin until 8:30. This allowed the network to air its highly rated sitcom The Cosby Show in its normal Thursday 8:00 p.m. timeslot. NBC went with carrying a very short pre-game show and got to first pitch at around 8:40 p.m. Eastern Time.

In the early years of the League Championship Series, NBC typically televised a doubleheader on Saturday, a single game on Sunday (because of football coverage). At the time, the network covered the weekday games with a 1½-hour overlap, joining the second game in progress when the first one ended (unless a rain delay caused the second game to start after the first game ended, as was the case during the 1972 NLCS, when the Pirates-Reds Game 5 was delayed long enough that by the time that the A's-Tigers ALCS Game 4 was over, NBC could join the game in time for the first pitch.). NBC usually swapped announcer crews after Game 2.

NBC did not air Game 2 of the 1972 NLCS or the 1974 NLCS.

Except for Game 1 in both League Championship Series, all games in 1975 were regionally televised. Game 3 of both League Championship Series were aired in prime time, the first time such an occurrence happened.

===== Monday Night Baseball (1972–75) =====
In 1972, NBC began televising prime time regular-season games on Mondays, under a four-year contract worth $72 million. During the previous two seasons, the network had shown a limited number of Monday night games, with three in 1970 and five in 1971, in addition to the All-Star games (on Tuesday night in July). In 1973, NBC extended the Monday night telecasts (with a local blackout) to fifteen consecutive games. NBC's last Monday Night Baseball game aired on September 1, 1975, in which the Montreal Expos beat the Philadelphia Phillies, 6–5. Curt Gowdy called the games with Tony Kubek from 1972 to 1974, being joined in the 1973 and 1974 seasons by various guest commentators from both within and outside of the baseball world (among them Dizzy Dean, Joe DiMaggio, Satchel Paige, Bobby Riggs, Dave DeBusschere, Howard Cosell, Mel Allen, Danny Kaye, and Willie Mays), while Jim Simpson and Maury Wills called the secondary backup games. Joe Garagiola hosted the pre-game show, The Baseball World of Joe Garagiola, and teamed with Gowdy to call the games in 1975.

During NBC's telecast of the Monday night Dodgers–Braves game on April 8, 1974, in which Hank Aaron hit his record-breaking 715th career home run, Kubek criticized Commissioner Bowie Kuhn on-air for failing to be in attendance at Fulton County Stadium in Atlanta on that historic night; Kuhn argued that he had a prior engagement that he could not break.

===== Joe Garagiola replaces Curt Gowdy =====
Starting in 1975, Joe Garagiola and Curt Gowdy alternated as the Saturday Game of Week play-by-play announcers with Tony Kubek doing color analysis. Then on weeks in which NBC had Monday Night Baseball, Gowdy and Garagiola worked together. One would call play-by-play for 4½ innings, the other would handle color analysis. Then in the bottom of the 5th inning, their roles switched. Ultimately, in November 1975, Chrysler forced NBC to totally remove Curt Gowdy from NBC's top baseball team. Instead, the company wanted their spokesman, Joe Garagiola, to call all the main regular season games, All-Star Games (when NBC had them), the top League Championship Series (when NBC had it), and the World Series (when NBC had it).

NBC hoped that, in replacing Curt Gowdy, Joe Garagiola's charm and unorthodox dwelling on the personal would stop the decade-long ratings dive for the Game of the Week. Instead, the ratings bobbed from 6.7 (1977) via 7.5 (1978) to 6.3 (1981–82). "Saturday had a constituency, but it didn't swell" said NBC Sports executive producer Scotty Connal. Some believed that millions missed Dizzy Dean while local-team television broadcasters split the audience. Scotty Connal believed that the team of Joe Garagiola and Tony Kubek were "A great example of black and white". Connal added by saying "A pitcher throws badly to third, Joe says, 'The third baseman's fault.' Tony: 'The pitcher's'." Media critic Gary Deeb termed theirs "the finest baseball commentary ever carried on network TV."

Another factor behind Gowdy's dismissal was the criticism from the national media which alleged that he sided with the Boston Red Sox (a franchise that he had covered prior to his days at NBC) on a controversial play in the 10th inning of Game 3 of the 1975 World Series. Cincinnati Reds pinch hitter Ed Armbrister reached base on what was ruled an error by Red Sox catcher Carlton Fisk on Armbrister's bunt attempt. Gowdy said numerous times that, in his opinion, Armbrister had interfered with Fisk. Gowdy had been given the correct interpretation by NBC Radio Producer Jay Scott (who was a Triple-A fill-in umpire at the time as well), but did not use it. Umpire Larry Barnett claimed he had received death threats on account of Gowdy's criticism. More to the point, Tony Kubek, on the NBC telecast, immediately charged that Armbrister interfered (with the attempted forceout), even though home plate umpire Barnett did not agree. Later, Kubek got 1,000 letters dubbing him a Boston stooge. Prior to Game 2 of the 1986 World Series, NBC did a feature on replays narrated by Bob Costas. One of the plays cited by Costas was the Armbrister play, and Barnett and Costas both insisted that Barnett had made the correct call, although Barnett declared, "You won't find many people in Boston who believe it was the right call." Costas used the feature to condemn the suggested notion of instant replay to settle calls, noting that it was the "same kind of mentality that adds color to classic movies and calls it progress."

While Gowdy was on hand in the press box for Carlton Fisk's legendary home run in Game 6 of the 1975 World Series, the actual calls went to two of Gowdy's Red Sox successors, Dick Stockton on television and Ned Martin on radio. Gowdy was Martin's color commentator on that home run. Stockton on NBC stayed silent as Fisk rounded the bases, waiting until he made his way into the Red Sox dugout before proclaiming: "We will have a seventh game in this 1975 World Series." Meanwhile, according to the NBC cameraman Lou Gerard located above the third base stands, cameramen at the time were instructed to follow the flight of the ball. Instead Gerard was distracted by a rat nearby, thus he lost track of the baseball and instead decided to capture the image of Fisk "magically" waving the ball fair.

==== 1976–79 ====
For Game 2 of the 1976 World Series, NBC and Major League Baseball experimented with a Sunday night telecast.

On June 18, 1977, in the New York Yankees' 10–4 loss to the Boston Red Sox in a nationally televised game at Fenway Park in Boston, Jim Rice, a powerful hitter but a slow runner, hit a ball into right field that Reggie Jackson seemed to get to without much speed, and Rice reached second base. Furious, Yankees manager Billy Martin removed Jackson from the game without even waiting for the end of the inning, sending Paul Blair out to replace him. When Jackson arrived at the dugout, Martin yelled that Jackson had shown him up. The two men argued, and Jackson said that Martin's heavy drinking had impaired his judgment. Despite Jackson being eighteen years younger, about two inches taller and maybe 40 pounds heavier, Martin lunged at him, and had to be restrained by coaches Yogi Berra and Elston Howard. Red Sox fans could see this in the dugout and began cheering wildly; NBC television cameras showed the confrontation to the entire country.

The 1977 postseason schedule started on Tuesday after starting on Saturday from 1969 to 1976. Major League Baseball began a pattern where one League Championship Series started on Tuesday and contained an off-day while the other LCS started on Wednesday with no off-day. NBC used three different announcer crews (Joe Garagiola and Tony Kubek, Jim Simpson and Maury Wills, and Dick Enberg and Don Drysdale) on the 1977 LCS.

After being replaced full-time by Joe Garagiola as the lead play-by-play man, NBC used Curt Gowdy in a hosting role for their coverage of the 1978 World Series.

On July 7, 1979, WMC 5 in Memphis, Tennessee aired a local Memphis wrestling program featuring Jerry "The King" Lawler instead of NBC's baseball telecast between the Detroit Tigers and Milwaukee Brewers.

===== Alternating coverage with ABC (1976–79) =====
Under the initial agreement with ABC, NBC and Major League Baseball (running through the 1976 to 1979 seasons), both networks paid $92.8 million for the league broadcast rights. ABC paid $12.5 million per year to show 16 Monday night games in 1976, 18 in the next three years, plus half the postseason (the League Championship Series in even-numbered years and World Series in odd-numbered years). NBC paid $10.7 million per year to show 25 Saturday Games of the Week and the other half of the postseason (the League Championship Series in odd-numbered years and World Series in even-numbered years).

Major League Baseball media director John Lazarus said of the new arrangement between NBC and ABC "Ratings couldn't get more from one network so we approached another." NBC's Joe Garagiola was not very fond of the new broadcasting arrangement at first saying "I wished they hadn't got half the package. Still, 'Game', half of the postseason – we got lots left." By 1980, income from television broadcasts accounted for a record 30% of the game's $500 million in revenues.

Michael Weisman became NBC's coordinating producer for baseball in 1979, where he learned baseball production from Harry Coyle, whom Weisman calls his idol and mentor. Weisman became the executive producer of NBC Sports in 1982. In baseball, Weisman introduced split-screen baseball coverage, which allowed fans to watch two games simultaneously. Weisman also was among the first producers to have baseball players introduce their team lineups, which helped personalize the game for viewers.

=== 1980s ===
==== 1980–82 ====
On October 4, 1980, Bob Costas made his debut calling baseball games for NBC. It was a backup game (the primary game involved the Philadelphia Phillies and Montreal Expos) involving the New York Yankees and Detroit Tigers from Yankee Stadium.

The 1980 World Series is tied with the 1978 Series for having the highest overall television ratings for a World Series to date, with the six games averaging a Nielsen rating of 32.8 and a share of 56. Although Bryant Gumbel anchored NBC's pregame coverage for Game 5 of the 1980 World Series, he was not present at Royals Stadium in Kansas City. Game 5 was scheduled on a Sunday, which conflicted with Gumbel's hosting duties for the network's NFL pre-game show NFL '80. As a result, Gumbel had to anchor the World Series coverage from the NBC Studios in New York City. Gumbel, however, would be present at Veterans Stadium in Philadelphia for Game 6, which turned out to be the clincher for the Phillies.

During the 1981 players' strike, NBC used its Saturday Game of the Week time-slot to show a 20-minute strike update, followed by a sports anthology series hosted by Caitlyn Jenner (then Bruce) (Note: Jenner changed her name due to gender transition in 2015.) called NBC Sports: The Summer Season.

As a means to recoup revenue lost during the 1981 players' strike, Major League Baseball set up a special additional playoff round (as a prelude to the League Championship Series). ABC televised the American League Division Series while NBC televised the National League Division Series. The Division Series round would not be officially instituted until 14 years later. Games 1, 3, and 5 of the Phillies/Expos series and Games 2, 3, and 5 of the Dodgers/Astros series were regionally televised.

Even though Dick Enberg did play-by-play for the 1981 NLCS for NBC (working alongside Tom Seaver), Merle Harmon was, for the most part, NBC's backup baseball play-by-play announcer (serving behind Joe Garagiola, who called that year's ALCS for NBC with Tony Kubek) in 1981. Harmon's broadcast partner during this period was Ron Luciano. In late 1979, Harmon left the Milwaukee Brewers completely in favor of a multi-year pact with NBC. Harmon saw the NBC deal as a perfect opportunity since according to The Milwaukee Journal he would make more money, get more exposure, and do less traveling. At NBC, Harmon did SportsWorld, the backup Game of the Week, and served as a field reporter for the 1980 World Series. Most of all, Harmon had hoped to cover the American-boycotted 1980 Summer Olympics from Moscow. After NBC pulled out of their scheduled coverage of the 1980 Summer Olympics, Harmon considered it to be "a great letdown." To add insult to injury, NBC fired Harmon in 1982 in favor of Bob Costas. It was in 1982 that Costas started working the NBC backup games on a full-time basis, with former Oakland A's third baseman Sal Bando as his color man.

On June 26, 1982, before the bottom of the 9th inning of NBC's Game of the Week between Boston and Milwaukee the power went out at Fenway Park. All television equipment stopped functioning except for one camera and the intercom. The director of the telecast, Harry Coyle, who had previously directed 36 World Series broadcasts for NBC, told the lone cameraman, Mario, "We'll show 'em what one cameraman can do!" and proceeded to direct the final inning of the game with just a single camera and zoom lens, located above home plate — including a near-comeback by the Red Sox, who before the start of the inning, were down 11–8.

According to his autobiography, Oh My, Dick Enberg (then the lead play-by-play voice for The NFL on NBC) was informed by NBC that he would become the lead play-by-play voice of the Major League Baseball Game of the Week beginning with the 1982 World Series (sharing the play-by-play duties for those games with Joe Garagiola, alongside analyst Tony Kubek) and through subsequent regular seasons. Enberg wrote that on his football trips, he would read every edition of The Sporting News to make sure he was current with all the baseball news and notes. He then met with NBC executives in September 1982, who informed him that Vin Scully was in negotiations to be their lead baseball play-by-play announcer (teaming with Garagiola, while Kubek would team with Bob Costas) and began with the network in the spring of 1983. Therefore, rather than throw him in randomly for one World Series, Enberg wrote that he hosted the pre-game/post-game shows while the team of Joe Garagiola and Tony Kubek did the games. According to the book, Enberg was not pleased about the decision (since he loved being the Los Angeles Angels' radio voice in the 1970s and was eager to return to baseball) but the fact that NBC was bringing in Scully, arguably baseball's best announcer, was understandable. Enberg added that NBC also gave him a significant pay increase as a pseudo-apology for not coming through on the promise to make him the lead baseball play-by-play announcer.

Tom Seaver provided periodic commentary during the 1982 World Series, but was not in the booth. As previously mentioned, Dick Enberg and Joe Garagiola traded off play-by-play duties (just as Tony Kubek had done with Garagiola in NBC's previous World Series broadcasts) for NBC's coverage in 1982. Garagiola called the first three and last three innings. Enberg, meanwhile, hosted the pregame show and then called the middle innings.

A Canadian Football League game between the Edmonton Eskimos at the Winnipeg Blue Bombers was tentatively scheduled for 1:30 p.m. Eastern Time on Sunday October 17, even making newspaper TV listings. At the last moment NBC, who was using the CFL as substitute programming during the 1982 players strike, cancelled the broadcast. The network was worried that the game would run over its allotted time and conflict with Game 5 of the World Series, which was supposed to begin at 4:30.

==== Alternating coverage with ABC (1983–89) ====
On April 7, 1983, Major League Baseball agreed to terms with ABC and NBC on a six-year television package, worth $1.2 billion. The two networks would continue to alternate coverage of the playoffs (ABC in even-numbered years and NBC in odd-numbered years), World Series (ABC would televise the World Series in odd-numbered years and NBC in even-numbered years) and All-Star Game (ABC would televise the All-Star Game in even-numbered years and NBC in odd-numbered years) through the 1989 season, with each of the 26 clubs receiving $7 million per year in return (even if no fans showed up). This was a substantial increase over the last package, in which each club was being paid $1.9 million per year. ABC contributed $575 million for the rights to televise prime time and Sunday afternoon regular season games and NBC paid $550 million for the rights to broadcast 30 Saturday afternoon games.

USA Network's coverage became a casualty of the new $1.2 billion television contract between Major League Baseball, ABC and NBC. One of the provisions to the new deal was that local telecasts that aired opposite network games had to be eliminated.

Through the deal, the two networks paid $20 million in advance for the 1983 season; both networks paid a total of $126 million in 1984 (NBC $70 million and ABC $56 million). For the 1985 season, the rights fee totaled $136 million (with NBC paying $61 million and ABC paying $75 million), although the networks got $9 million when Major League Baseball expanded the League Championship Series from a best-of-five to a best-of-seven in 1985. The total rights fee increased to $141 million for 1986 (NBC $75 million, ABC $66 million), $171 million for 1987 (NBC $81 million, ABC $90 million) and then to $186 million for the 1988 (NBC $90 million, ABC $96 million). For the final year of the contract in 1989, NBC paid a fee of $106 million and ABC paid $125 million to the league, with the total rising to $231 million.

NBC also would normally televise two prime time games during the regular season (not including All-Star Games). Generally, NBC would broadcast one game on a Tuesday and the other on a Friday. They however, would have to compete against local teams' over-the-air broadcasts, putting NBC at risk of hampering its ratings.

===== Memorable moments =====
The New York Times observed the performance of the team of Vin Scully and Joe Garagiola by saying "That the duo of Scully and Garagiola is very good, and often even great, is no longer in dispute." A friend of Garagiola's said "he understood the cash" concerning 407% hike in Major League Baseball fees paid by NBC for the 1984–89 contract. At this point the idea was basically summarized as Vin Scully "being the star", whereas Joe Garagiola was Pegasus or NBC's junior light. When NBC inked a six-year, $550 million contract in the fall of 1982, a return on the investment, so to speak, demanded that Vin Scully be their star baseball announcer. NBC Sports head Thomas Watson said about Scully, "He is baseball's best announcer. Why shouldn't he be ours?" Dick Enberg mused "No room for me. 'Game' had enough for two teams a week." Henry Hecht once wrote "NBC's Curt Gowdy, Tony Kubek, and Monte Moore sounded like college radio rejects vs. Scully." Vin Scully earned approximately $2 million per year for his NBC baseball broadcasting duties.

Besides calling the Saturday Game of the Week for NBC, Scully called three World Series (1984, 1986, and 1988), four National League Championship Series (1983, 1985, 1987, and 1989), and four All-Star Games (1983, 1985, 1987, and 1989). Scully also reworked his Dodgers schedule during this period, broadcasting home games on the radio, and road games for the Dodgers television network, with Fridays and Saturdays off so he could work for NBC.

Scully was on hand for several key moments in baseball history: Fred Lynn hitting the first grand slam in All-Star Game history (1983); the 1984 Detroit Tigers winning the World Series (along the way, Scully called Tigers pitcher Jack Morris' no-hitter against the Chicago White Sox on April 7); Ozzie Smith's game-winning home run in Game 5 of the 1985 National League Championship Series; the New York Mets' miracle rally in Game 6 of the 1986 World Series; the 1987 All-Star Game in Oakland, which was deadlocked at 0–0 before Tim Raines broke up the scoreless tie with a triple in the top of the 13th inning; the first official night game in the history of Chicago's Wrigley Field (August 9, 1988); Kirk Gibson's game-winning home run in Game 1 of the 1988 World Series; and chatting with former President of the United States Ronald Reagan (who said to Scully, "I've been out of work for six months and maybe there's a future here.") in the booth during the 1989 All-Star Game in Anaheim as Bo Jackson hit a lead off home-run.

When Tony Kubek first teamed with Bob Costas in 1983, Kubek said "I'm not crazy about being assigned to the backup game, but it's no big ego deal." Costas said about working with Kubek "I think my humor loosened Tony, and his knowledge improved me." The team of Costas and Kubek proved to be a formidable pair. There were even some who preferred the team of Kubek and Costas over the musings of Vin Scully and the asides of Joe Garagiola. Costas was praised by fans for both his reverence and irreverence while Kubek was praised for his technical approach and historical perspective.

For the 1983 season, NBC introduced a wraparound studio show (airing for about 15 minutes) co-hosted by Bill Macatee and Mike Adamle called 30 Rock (a reference to the New York City skyscraper that housed NBC's headquarters). The show would offer sports news, highlights and feature reports from Len Berman. It would actually handle breaking news as well. NBC canceled the 30 Rock pregame show after one year. It was also used to wraparound college basketball games, golf, and NBC SportsWorld. 1983 was also the last season that the old blackout restrictions were in place. Thus, Vin Scully's first Game of the Week telecast (Montreal at Los Angeles on April 9) did not air in Los Angeles.

For NBC's coverage of the 1983 All-Star Game in Chicago, Don Sutton was in New York, periodically tracking pitches with the aid of NBC's "Inside Pitch" technology. Sutton also served as an analyst alongside host Bill Macatee for NBC's coverage of the 1983 American League Championship Series. Meanwhile, Len Berman hosted NBC's coverage of the 1983 National League Championship Series alongside Tom Seaver.

1984 was the first year that the Game of the Week was not subject to blackout. NBC and ABC generally still aired two games each week, with a primary game carried to most of the country and a secondary game to mostly the markets that would carry that game. This was mostly done for insurance in the event that a game was rained out. During the 1970s and early 1980s, many of the "rainout insurance" games involved the Houston Astros since that team played in a domed ballpark. Therefore, if the Astros were at home on a given Saturday or Monday night, then it was a safe bet that the game would be shown on network television, due to the Astros being the only "dome" team (until the Seattle Mariners began play in the Kingdome in 1977).

During the 1984 regular season, the reason for most of the changes from the traditional 2:00 p.m. Eastern Time start was because of NBC's golf or tennis commitments as well as September 1 title fight featuring Eusebio Pedroza.

Bob Costas and Tony Kubek were the announcers on the "Sandberg Game" on June 23, 1984, from Chicago's Wrigley Field. In that game, Cubs second baseman Ryne Sandberg hit two crucial, game tying home runs off of St. Louis Cardinals closer Bruce Sutter in both the bottom of the ninth and tenth innings. The Cubs would ultimately go on to win the game in eleven innings, by the score of 12–11. Bob Costas considered the Game of the Week his dream job saying "You can put a personal stamp on a baseball broadcast, be a reporter, something of a historian, a storyteller, conversationalist, dispenser of opinion."

As champions of the National League, the San Diego Padres had home-field advantage (at the time, the NL automatically gained home-field advantage in even years of the World Series) during the 1984 World Series. However, had the Chicago Cubs won the National League Championship Series (which appeared likely after the Cubs took a 2–0 lead in the best-of-five series), the Detroit Tigers would have gained home-field advantage despite the fact the American League's Baltimore Orioles had it the season before. NBC was contractually obligated to show all mid-week series games in prime time, something that would have been impossible at Wrigley Field, since the Cubs' venerable facility lacked lights at the time (they would not install lights until four years later). Had the Cubs advanced to the Series, Detroit would have hosted Games 1, 2, 6, and 7 (on Tuesday and Wednesday nights), while the Cubs would have hosted Games 3, 4, and 5 (on Friday, Saturday, and Sunday), with all three games in Chicago starting no later than 1:30 p.m. Central Time.

Even though Game 5 of the 1984 World Series was on a Sunday afternoon, Bob Costas (who anchored NBC's coverage with Len Berman) was still in New York City to host NFL '84. At the end of the pre-game show, Costas left the New York studio to travel to Detroit to cover that night's baseball game at Tiger Stadium. In the meantime, Bill Macatee filled-in for Costas, providing updates and halftime highlights. Costas later interviewed the Tigers in their locker room that night. Game 5 of the 1984 World Series had a starting time of 4:45 p.m. ET, following a 1:30 p.m. start for Game 4. These were the last outdoor World Series games to start earlier than prime time in the eastern United States (Game 6 in 1987, the last daytime World Series contest, was indoors at the Hubert H. Humphrey Metrodome in Minneapolis).

In 1985, NBC got a break when Major League Baseball dictated a policy that no local game could be televised at the same time that a network Game of the Week was being broadcast. Additionally, for the first time, NBC was able to feed the Game of the Week telecasts to the two cities whose local teams participated. In time, MLB teams whose Saturday games were not scheduled for the Game of the Week would move the start time of their Saturday games to avoid conflict with the NBC network game, and thus, make it available to local television in the team's home city (and the visiting team's home city as well). Also in 1985, NBC's telecast of the All-Star Game out of the Metrodome in Minnesota was the first program to be broadcast in stereo by a television network.

On Thursday, October 10, 1985, NBC didn't come on the air for Game 2 of the NLCS until 8:30 p.m. ET to avoid disrupting The Cosby Show at 8 (similarly to how the network aired the soap opera Return to Peyton Place, before Game 5 of the 1972 World Series, rather than a pre-game show). NBC would do the same thing for Thursday night games in subsequent postseasons. Dick Enberg hosted the 1985 NLCS pregame shows with Joe Morgan. It was Enberg who broke the news to most of the nation that Vince Coleman had been injured before Game 4. NBC even aired an interview with one of the few people who actually saw the incident, a Dodger batboy.

Dick Enberg was also at Exhibition Stadium in Toronto for Games 1 and 7 of the 1985 American League Championship Series on NBC. Enberg hosted the pregame show alongside Rick Dempsey (who was still active with Baltimore at the time). Meanwhile, Bill Macatee provided a report on Game 2 of the ALCS during the pregame of the NLCS opener.

Beginning in 1986, Jon Miller would call games for NBC on their occasional doubleheader weeks. If not that, then Miller would appear on Saturday afternoon regionals the day after NBC's occasional prime time telecasts. Come the World Series that year, NBC would introduce a new theme called "Heroes". The track was composed by Steve Martin (no relation to the actor-comedian of the same name) of the production music factory Killer Tracks. NBC would use "Heroes" as their postseason and All-Star Game theme from 1986 to 1989, and also the Game of the Week theme for 1989. The theme itself, portrayed as serious, regal and almost reflective tone.

Vin Scully's call of the final play in Game 6 of the 1986 World Series on NBC television would quickly become an iconic one to baseball fans, with the normally calm Scully growing increasingly excited: "So the winning run is at second base, with two outs, three and two to Mookie Wilson. [A] little roller up along first... behind the bag! It gets through Buckner! Here comes Knight, and the Mets win it!" Scully then remained silent for more than three minutes, letting the pictures and the crowd noise tell the story. Scully resumed with "If one picture is worth a thousand words, you have seen about a million words, but more than that, you have seen an absolutely bizarre finish to Game 6 of the 1986 World Series. The Mets are not only alive, they are well; and they will play the Red Sox in Game 7 tomorrow!"

After the top of the tenth, NBC began setting up in the visiting clubhouse for what they believed was the inevitable postgame victory celebration by the Boston Red Sox. The Commissioner's Trophy had been brought into the Red Sox clubhouse along with several bottles of champagne, and Bob Costas was to preside over the presentation. However, after Bob Stanley's wild pitch in the bottom of the tenth, everything was quickly struck and removed from the room before the Red Sox returned. Costas later recalled the removal of all the equipment for the postgame celebration as being "like a scene change in a Broadway musical. In, out, gone, not a trace." Game 6 caused the first preemption of Saturday Night Live, due to extra innings. The preempted episode would air two weeks later on November 8 (with host Rosanna Arquette and musical guest Ric Ocasek of The Cars), with an introduction by Ron Darling, who explained that when the Mets entered the locker room, they were informed that they caused the first delay in SNL's 11-year history (at the time) to their dismay.

NBC's broadcast of Game 7 of the 1986 World Series (which went up against a Monday Night Football game between the Washington Redskins and New York Giants on ABC) garnered a Nielsen rating of 38.9 and a 55 share, making it the highest-rated single World Series game to date. Game 7 had been scheduled for Sunday, but a rain-out forced the game to Monday. NBC's telecast of the Series ended with the song "Limelight" from Stereotomy, penultimate album of The Alan Parsons Project.

NBC used Don Sutton as a pre- and post-game analyst for their 1987 League Championship Series coverage. Sutton also made an appearance in the booth during Game 3 of the ALCS. Sutton talked with Bob Costas and Tony Kubek about Twins pitcher Les Straker's borderline balk in that game. Sutton later interviewed Detroit Tigers manager Sparky Anderson following their loss in Game 5. Meanwhile, Marv Albert went back-and-forth during both 1987 LCS. He hosted the pregame for Game 1 of the NLCS with Joe Morgan, and in fact had to read the lineups to the viewing audience. There was a problem with the P.A. feed at Busch Memorial Stadium in St. Louis, so he ended up reading the script from the Cardinal dugout while the players were introduced to the crowd. He then went to Minneapolis the next night to host the ALCS pregame with Don Sutton at the Hubert H. Humphrey Metrodome. Jimmy Cefalo hosted the pregame coverage for Game 5 of the NLCS, as Marv Albert was away on a boxing assignment for NBC.

Jay Randolph, who was also the sports director for St. Louis NBC affiliate KSDK, interviewed the winners in the St. Louis Cardinals' clubhouse following their Game 7 victory. Also following Game 7, NBC's Marv Albert interviewed 1987 NLCS MVP, Jeffrey Leonard of the San Francisco Giants (to date, the last person from the losing team to win a postseason series Most Valuable Player Award, either League Championship Series or World Series).

Ratings for the Game of the Week had dropped from an average of 6.1 in 1984 to 5.5 in 1988 and an average of 4.8 by July 1989. According to a Major League Baseball report, an average of fewer than five million households viewed the Saturday afternoon Game of the Week in 1988. In an effort to push the ratings higher, NBC tried to feature a club from one of the major media markets. Of the 32 games it aired during 1988, only three did not feature a club from New York City, Chicago, or Los Angeles.

===== 1988 World Series and 1989 All-Star Game and League Championship Series =====
Longtime Los Angeles Dodgers' broadcaster Vin Scully called the 1988 World Series for a national television audience on NBC with Joe Garagiola. Unknown to the fans and the media at the time, Kirk Gibson was watching the game on television while undergoing physical therapy in the Dodgers' clubhouse. At some point during the game, television cameras scanned the Dodgers dugout and Scully, observed that Gibson was nowhere to be found. This spurred Gibson to tell Dodgers manager Tommy Lasorda that he was available to pinch hit. Gibson immediately returned to the batting cage in the clubhouse to take practice swings. While Kirk Gibson was taking practice swings in the Dodgers' clubhouse during Game 1, Orel Hershiser set up the hitting tee for his teammate. Along the way, Bob Costas could hear Gibson's agonized-sounding grunts after every hit.

The following is Vin Scully's call of Kirk Gibson's game inning home run in Game 1 of the 1988 World Series of the 1988 World Series: "All year long, they looked to him to light the fire, [Scully began] and all year long, he answered the demands, until he was physically unable to start tonight – with two bad legs: The bad left hamstring, and the swollen right knee. And, with two out, you talk about a roll of the dice... this is it." Scully made repeated references to Gibson's legs, noting at one point that the batter was "shaking his left leg, making it quiver, like a horse trying to get rid of a troublesome fly." Gibson worked the count to 3–2 as Mike Davis stole second base; the camera turned at that point to Steve Sax getting ready for his turn at the plate, and Scully reminded the viewers that Sax was waiting on deck, but that the game right now is at the plate. "High fly ball into right field, she i-i-i-is... gone!!" Scully said nothing for over a minute, allowing the pictures to tell the story. Finally, he said, "In a year that has been so improbable... the impossible has happened!" Returning to the subject of Gibson's banged-up legs during a replay, Scully joked, "And, now, the only question was, could he make it around the base paths unassisted?!" "You know, I said it once before, a few days ago, that Kirk Gibson was not the Most Valuable Player; that the Most Valuable Player for the Dodgers was Tinkerbell. But, tonight, I think Tinkerbell backed off for Kirk Gibson. And, look at Eckersley – shocked to his toes!" "They are going wild at Dodger Stadium – no one wants to leave!" As NBC showed a replay of Gibson rounding second base in his home run trot, Scully then made a point to note Eckersley's pitching performance throughout the 1988 season, to put things in perspective. "Dennis Eckersley allowed five home runs all year. And we'll be back."

During Game 1 in the second inning, NBC affiliate WMGT-TV in Macon, Georgia was hijacked for 10 seconds replacing parts of the second inning with an adult movie. The technician was later fired, and production manager L. A. Sturdivant reported to The Atlanta Constitution at the incident was an accident.

Bob Costas, who, along with Marv Albert, hosted NBC's 1988 World Series pre-game coverage and handled post-game interviews, later made on-air statements that enraged many in the Dodgers' clubhouse (especially Tommy Lasorda). Before the start of Game 4, Costas said that the Dodgers quite possibly were about to put up the weakest-hitting lineup in World Series history. That comment ironically fired up the competitive spirit of the Dodgers. After the Dodgers won Game 4, Lasorda (during a post-game interview with Marv Albert) sarcastically said that the MVP of the World Series should be Bob Costas.

Game 6 of the 1988 World Series, was scheduled to start at 5 p.m. ET on Saturday, October 22, but that game wasn't necessary. This is the last time a World Series game was scheduled outside of prime time. The 1988 World Series also marked the last time that NBC would televise a World Series for seven years. Beginning in 1990, NBC would be shut out of Major League Baseball coverage completely, after CBS signed a four-year, exclusive television contract. After splitting coverage of the 1995 World Series with ABC, NBC would next cover a World Series exclusively in 1997. Over a highlight montage at the end of their coverage of the decisive fifth game of the 1988 World Series, NBC played the song "One Moment in Time" by Whitney Houston.

On Saturday, June 3, 1989, Vin Scully was doing the play-by-play for the NBC Game of the Week in St. Louis, where the Cardinals beat the Chicago Cubs in 10 innings. Meanwhile, the Dodgers were playing a series in Houston, where Scully flew to be on hand to call the Sunday game of the series. However, the Saturday night game between the teams was going into extra innings when Scully arrived in town, so he went to the Astrodome instead of his hotel. He picked up the play-by-play, helping to relieve the other Dodger announcers, who were doing both television and radio, and broadcast the final 13 innings (after already calling 10 innings in St. Louis), as the game went 22 innings. He broadcast 23 innings in one day in two different cities.

As previously mentioned, former President of the United States, Ronald Reagan (who had just left office) served as the color commentator instead of Tom Seaver (Vin Scully's normal NBC broadcasting partner at the time) for the first inning of the 1989 All-Star Game from Anaheim. Bo Jackson became a popular figure for his athleticism in multiple sports through the late 1980s and early 1990s. He served as a spokesman for Nike and was involved in a popular ad campaign called "Bo Knows" which envisioned Jackson attempting to take up a litany of other sports, including tennis, golf, luge, auto racing, and even playing blues music with Bo Diddley, who scolded Jackson by telling him, "You don't know diddley!" (in a later version of the spot, Jackson is shown playing the guitar expertly, after which an impressed Diddley says, "Bo...you do know Diddley, don't you?") Serendipitously, the original spot first aired during the commercial break immediately following Jackson's lead-off home run in the 1989 Major League Baseball All-Star Game (as Vin Scully exclaimed, "Look at that one! Bo Jackson says hello!").

CTV would simulcast NBC Game of the Week telecasts of Toronto Blue Jays games, such as NBC's final Game of the Week telecast on September 30, 1989, where the Blue Jays clinched the American League East against the Baltimore Orioles. Meanwhile, in the latter part of his career, National League umpire Doug Harvey became known for appearing in the "You Make the Call" segments on NBC's Game of the Week telecasts.

Then Texas Rangers manager Bobby Valentine worked as an on-the-field analyst for NBC's 1989 ALCS coverage. Likewise, recently retired Philadelphia Phillies legend Mike Schmidt did the same for the NLCS.

Vin Scully was unable to call Game 2 of the 1989 National League Championship Series because he was suffering from laryngitis. As a result, secondary play-by-play announcer Bob Costas filled in for him. Around the same time, Costas was assigned to call the American League Championship Series between Oakland and Toronto. Game 2 of the NLCS occurred on Thursday, October 5, which was an off day for the ALCS. NBC then decided to fly Costas from Toronto to Chicago to substitute for Scully on Thursday night. Afterwards, Costas flew back to Toronto, where he resumed work on the ALCS the next night.

Jimmy Cefalo hosted the pregame show for Game 4 of the 1989 ALCS as Marv Albert was away on an NFL assignment for NBC.

==== The end of an era ====
After calling the 1988 World Series with Vin Scully, Joe Garagiola resigned from NBC Sports. Although it was not official at the time, NBC was on the verge of losing the television rights to cover Major League Baseball to CBS. Garagiola claimed that NBC left him "twisting" while he was trying to renegotiate his deal. Joe Garagiola was replaced by Tom Seaver for the 1989 season.

On December 14, 1988, CBS (under the guidance of Commissioner Peter Ueberroth, Major League Baseball's broadcast director Bryan Burns, CBS Inc. CEO Laurence Tisch as well as CBS Sports executives Neal Pilson and Eddie Einhorn) paid approximately US$1.8 billion (equivalent to 2.71 billion in 2025) for exclusive over-the-air television rights for over four years (beginning in 1990). CBS paid about $265 million each year for the World Series, League Championship Series, All-Star Game, and the Saturday Game of the Week. It was one of the largest agreements (to date) between the sport of baseball and the business of broadcasting. The cost of the deal between CBS and Major League Baseball was about 25% more than in the previous television contract with ABC and NBC.

NBC's final Major League Baseball broadcast was televised on October 9, 1989; Game 5 of the National League Championship Series between the San Francisco Giants and Chicago Cubs from Candlestick Park. Vin Scully said

It's a passing of a great American tradition. It is sad. I really and truly feel that. It will leave a vast window, to use a Washington word, where people will not get Major League Baseball and I think that's a tragedy. It's a staple that's gone. I feel for people who come to me and say how they miss it, and I hope me.

When Cubs shortstop Ryne Sandberg made the final out of Game 5 off of Giants closer Steve Bedrosian and Giants first baseman Will Clark ultimately caught it, Scully said

Breaking ball hit to Robby Thompson … and that's it!

Bob Costas said that he would rather do a Game of the Week that got a 5 rating than host a Super Bowl. "Who thought baseball killed its best way to reach the public? It coulda kept us and CBS – we'd have kept the 'Game' – but it only cared about cash. Whatever else I did, I'd never have left 'Game of the Week' Costas claimed. Tony Kubek, who (as previously mentioned) teamed with Bob Costas since 1983, said "I can't believe it!" when the subject came about NBC losing baseball for the first time since 1947.

Alright, our thanks to Marv Albert and my personal thanks for the last seven years to Tony Kubek. He made it easy, he made it fun...24 years with NBC broadcasting baseball, immediately after he retired from the Yankees in 1965, helping them to all those pennants, right into the broadcast booth. He immediately became an institution in American baseball broadcasting and we're all...going to miss him. Vin Scully and Tom Seaver will take you the rest of the way in the National League series and then a week or so down the road, our very best wishes to our buddies and colleagues at ABC: Al Michaels, Tim McCarver, and Jim Palmer for the World Series. A World Series that for the second year in a row...will feature Tony La Russa's Oakland A's, back-to-back winners...of the American League pennant. Congratulations to both the Blue Jays and the A's for outstanding seasons. And from the SkyDome in Toronto...for now at least...so long!

— Bob Costas at the end of NBC's coverage of Game 5 of the 1989 American League Championship Series on October 8, 1989. This was not only Costas' final broadcast with Tony Kubek, but his final broadcast of a Major League Baseball game on NBC until the 1994 All-Star Game from Pittsburgh.

Author and presidential speechwriter Curt Smith went a step further in saying that Major League Baseball's deal with CBS Sports was "sportscasting's Exxon Valdez." Had baseball valued national promotion provided by the Game of the Week, said Smith, it never would have crafted a fast-bucks plan that has cut off the widest viewership. "It's an obscene imbalance", Smith also said, "to have 175 games going to 60 percent of the country [in reference to Major League Baseball's corresponding cable television deal with ESPN, which at the time was only available in about 60% of the country] and 16 games going to the rest." He added: "Baseball has paid a grievous price for being out of sight and out of mind. It's attacked the lower and middle classes that forms baseball's heart. ... In the end, the advertising community has come to view baseball as a leper."

Arthur Watson, president of NBC Sports, said in a statement that NBC had "aggressively" bid to continue its 41-year involvement in baseball (NBC's bid was reportedly in the $800 million range in contrast to CBS' bid of $1.08 billion) and was "deeply saddened" when learning of CBS' deal.

One possible key factor towards why NBC lost the baseball package to CBS was due to their commitment to broadcasting the 1992 Summer Olympics from Barcelona. To put things into proper perspective, two weeks prior to the announcement of the baseball deal with CBS, NBC had committed itself to paying $401 million for U.S. broadcast rights to the 1992 Summer Olympics. After the baseball deal was announced, some skeptics surmised that CBS had lowballed the Barcelona bidding so that it would have at least $1 billion to spend on baseball.

On that end, Marv Albert considered NBC's loss of the baseball rights to CBS a disappointment because they had just won the rights to televise the 1992 Olympic Games from Barcelona. Albert also told The New York Times in August 1989 that from NBC's point of view, it would come down to three major negotiations that would take place in the fall of that year. The National Basketball Association (NBA), the NCAA basketball tournament and some college football. Albert also agreed with the notion regarding whether the average fan would be shut out of Major League Baseball with only 12 Saturday afternoon games being televised by CBS. He added that the then present major league regime might not have agreed to the same package. According to him, Major League Baseball, similar to the NBA, felt that limited exposure would be better for the game. In Albert's eyes, what CBS was doing was televising the regular season for the delight of carrying the All-Star Game, the playoffs and the World Series.

According to industry insiders, neither NBC nor ABC wanted the entire baseball package—that is, regular-season games, both League Championship Series and the World Series—because such a commitment would have required them to preempt too many highly rated prime time shows. Thus, ABC and NBC bid thinking that two of the networks might share postseason play again or that one of the championship series might wind up on cable. Peter Ueberroth had encouraged the cable idea, but after the bids were opened, NBC and ABC found to their chagrin that he preferred network exposure for all postseason games. Only CBS, with its weak prime time programming, dared go for that.

Since this is indeed...a sad moment for us as we sever our relationship with baseball...for a while at least, we would like to ask your indulgence and let us take this time to thank a lot of people!

— Vin Scully prior to reading off the credits for NBC's 1989 NLCS coverage following the San Francisco Giants' pennant clinching victory against the Chicago Cubs.

And to all of the marvelous and wonderful cameramen and technicians who have represented NBC...over the 42 years of baseball broadcasts...and I think that can sum it up, each and everyone of us...we gave it our best shot! As did the Giants and the Cubs! And it's the Giants who go to the World Series, beating the Cubs 3 to 2. And we get the BART Series, the Bay Area Rapid Transit, the series that will be played in memory of A. Bartlett Giamatti. There's a sweetness to that thought! It's over for us...time to surrender the stage...and the Giants have won the pennant! For Tom Seaver and for Mike Schmidt, this is Vin Scully saying so long...for the last time...from San Francisco!

— Vin Scully's final words as NBC signs off from its Major League Baseball coverage for the final time on October 9, 1989.

To those of you at NBC, for 41 years you made this an art form! And to people especially like Curt Gowdy Sr., the fabulous announcer...to the Hall of Fame director Harry Coyle...and down through the years...to Tony Kubek and the people of the present like Bob Costas and all the men and women at NBC, at the peacock...take a bow, you were terrific!

— ABC's Al Michaels eulogizing NBC at the end of ABC's coverage of Game 4 the 1989 World Series.

===== Aftermath =====
After NBC lost the Major League Baseball package to CBS, NBC aggressively counterprogrammed (like ABC) CBS's postseason baseball coverage with made-for-TV movies and miniseries geared towards female viewers. NBC also attempted to fill the void left by baseball by arranging with the National Hockey League (NHL) to broadcast their annual All-Star Game. And almost exactly one month after NBC's final baseball telecast, NBC officially announced a four-year, $600 million deal with the National Basketball Association (NBA), succeeding CBS as the NBA's network television partner.

Following his brief tenure as NBC's lead baseball analyst, Tom Seaver worked as an analyst for New York Yankees' telecasts on WPIX until 1993 and for New York Mets' telecasts on WPIX from 1999 to 2005, making him one of three sportscasters to be regular announcers for both teams; the others are Fran Healy and Tim McCarver.

When NBC lost its baseball TV rights to CBS after the 1989 season, Tony Kubek left the national scene, joining the Yankees' local cable-TV announcing team. Kubek spent five years calling games for the Yankees (1990–1994) on the MSG Network with Dewayne Staats, where he earned fans and critics' respect for his honesty.

After the National League Championship Series in 1989, Vin Scully's NBC contract was up and he left to focus primarily on his duties with the Los Angeles Dodgers. Scully eventually returned to being the national radio announcer for the World Series, since CBS Radio gave him the position that Jack Buck had vacated in order to become the primary announcer of CBS's television coverage of Major League Baseball. Scully's first assignment was the 1990 World Series and he remained in that role until 1997, working with Johnny Bench for the first four years and Jeff Torborg for the final three.

After leaving NBC Sports after the 1988 World Series, Joe Garagiola spent one season (1990) as a cable-television commentator for the California Angels. From 1998 to 2012, he performed part-time color commentary duties for the Arizona Diamondbacks, where his son Joe Jr. was general manager.

On July 21, 1990, approximately ten months after its final Major League Baseball telecast, NBC aired an amateur baseball game between the United States and Cuba from Estadio Latinoamericano in Havana, Cuba as part of the Saturday Sports Showcase anthology series. Bob Costas returned to provide play-by-play alongside former New York Mets manager Davey Johnson.

On February 8, 1992, NBC broadcast the 11th Annual Pepsi All-Star Softball Game from Palm Springs Angels Stadium in Palm Springs, California. Among the game's participants were Cal Ripken Jr., Ken Griffey Jr., Bobby Bonilla, Tony Gwynn, Ryne Sandberg, Kirby Puckett, Paul Molitor, Cecil Fielder, Frank Thomas, and Craig Biggio, who would be named the game's Most Valuable Player. Joel Meyers and then-Los Angeles Dodgers manager Tommy Lasorda served as commentators.

== The Baseball Network (1994–95) ==
After a four-year hiatus with CBS being the exclusive MLB over-the-air broadcaster, ABC and NBC returned to Major League Baseball under the umbrella of a revenue sharing venture called "The Baseball Network". While ABC and NBC would provide some production personnel and their own announcers for the games, all of would be coordinated from the office of Ken Schanzer, the chief executive officer of The Baseball Network and former executive vice president for NBC Sports. The graphics, camera placements, and audio quality were intended on looking and sounding about the same on both networks.

The Baseball Network kicked off its coverage on July 12, 1994, with the All-Star Game out of Three Rivers Stadium in Pittsburgh. The game was televised on NBC with Bob Costas, Joe Morgan and Bob Uecker calling the action, and Greg Gumbel hosting the pre-game show. Helping with the interviews were Hannah Storm and Johnny Bench. The 1994 All-Star Game reportedly sold out all its advertising slots; this was considered an impressive financial accomplishment, given that one 30-second spot cost $300,000.

After the All-Star Game, NBC was scheduled to televise six regular season games on Fridays or Saturdays in prime time. The networks had exclusive rights for the twelve regular season dates, in that no regional or national cable service or over-the-air broadcaster may telecast a Major League Baseball game on those dates. In even-numbered years, NBC would have the rights to the All-Star Game and both League Championship Series, while ABC would have the World Series and newly created Division Series. In odd-numbered years, the postseason and All-Star Game television rights were supposed to alternate.

The long-term plans for The Baseball Network crumbled when the Major League Baseball Players' Association went on strike on August 12, 1994 (thus forcing the cancellation of the World Series). Consequently, NBC was unable to air its slate of games, which were supposed to begin on August 26. Therefore, the All-Star Game was NBC's sole baseball broadcast in 1994. Meanwhile, another consequence of the strike was that Dick Enberg, who was supposed to be the secondary play-by-play announcer in 1994 for NBC was unable to participate by the following season, due to his other commitments for NBC such as golf and football. As a result, his slot was taken by Greg Gumbel, who was also the secondary play-by-play man for CBS (behind Sean McDonough) during their final season of broadcasting Major League Baseball games in 1993.

When the question aroused regarding why NBC didn't rehire Costas' old broadcast partner, Tony Kubek (for whom Costas worked with on the Game of the Week and NBC's bi-yearly coverage of the ALCS from 1983–1989), it was insinuated that Kubek was simply too independent-minded for NBC officials to tolerate. According to Costas, while he originally wanted to work with Kubek again, NBC simply wanted to go into a different direction after being away from baseball for nearly five years.

In July 1995, ABC and NBC, which wound up having to share the duties of televising the 1995 World Series as a way to recoup (with ABC broadcasting Games 1, 4 and 5, and NBC broadcasting Games 2 3, and 6), announced that they were opting out of their agreement with Major League Baseball. Both networks figured that as the delayed 1995 baseball season opened without a labor agreement, there was no guarantee against another strike. Both networks soon publicly vowed to cut all ties with Major League Baseball for the remainder of the 20th century.

Prior to Game 3 of the 1995 World Series, Cleveland Indians slugger Albert Belle unleashed a profanity-laced tirade at NBC reporter Hannah Storm as she was waiting in the Indians' dugout for a prearranged interview with Indians lead-off man, Kenny Lofton. On the same day, Belle snapped at a photographer near the first base line during batting practice. Belle was ultimately fined US$50,000 for his behavior towards Storm. This particular World Series was remembered for baseball television history being made twice by Storm. Prior to Game 2, she became the first female sportscaster to serve as solo host of a World Series game, and after Game 6, she would be the first female sportscaster to preside over the presentation of the Commissioner's Trophy to the World Series champions. However, she was not the first female sportscaster to cover the World Series: that honor fell to CBS Sports reporter Lesley Visser, who served as a field reporter for the Series from 1990 to 1993. She would also cover that same World Series but for a different network, ABC Sports.

During the 1995–96 television season, the World Series, Super Bowl, NBA Finals and Summer Olympics were all telecast by NBC, marking the only time in history that all four marquee events were aired by the same network.

Left-centerfield, Grissom on the run...the team of the '90s has its World Championship!!!

— Bob Costas calling the final out of Game 6 of the 1995 World Series.

ABC broadcaster Al Michaels would later write in his 2014 autobiography You Can't Make This Up: Miracles, Memories, and the Perfect Marriage of Sports and Television that the competition between the two networks could be so juvenile that neither ABC nor NBC wanted to promote each other's telecasts during the 1995 World Series. To give you a better idea, in the middle of Game 1, Michaels was handed a promo that read "Join us here on ABC for Game 4 in Cleveland on Wednesday night and for Game 5 if necessary, Thursday." Michaels however, would soon follow this up by saying "By the way, if you're wondering about Games 2 and 3, I can't tell you exactly where you can see them, but here's a hint: Last night, Bob Costas, Bob Uecker, and Joe Morgan [NBC's broadcast crew] were spotted in Underground Atlanta." Naturally, Costas soon made a similar reference to ABC's crew (Michaels, Jim Palmer, and Tim McCarver) on NBC.

About five years after The Baseball Network dissolved, Bob Costas wrote in his book Fair Ball: A Fan's Case for Baseball that The Baseball Network was stupid and an abomination. Costas believed that the agreement involving the World Series being the only instance of The Baseball Network broadcasting a national telecast was an unprecedented surrender of prestige, as well as a slap to all serious fans. Unlike the National Hockey League and the National Basketball Association the so-called "Big Two" of North American professional sports leagues, the National Football League and Major League Baseball had nationally televised all playoff games for decades. While he believed that The Baseball Network fundamentally corrupted the game (except in Costas' point-of-view, the sense that the fans held steadfast, spaniel-like loyalty), Costas himself acknowledged that the most impassioned fans in baseball were now prevented from watching many of the playoff games they wanted to see. Costas added that both the divisional series and the League Championship Series now merited scarcely higher priority than regional coverage provided for a Big Ten football game between Wisconsin and Michigan.

== Trouble at NBC (1996–2000) ==
Despite the failure of The Baseball Network, NBC decided to retain its relationship with Major League Baseball, but on a far more restricted basis. Under the five-year deal signed on November 7, 1995 (running from the 1996 to 2000 seasons) for a total of approximately $400 million, NBC did not televise any regular season games. Instead, NBC only handled the All-Star Game, three Division Series games (on Tuesday, Friday, and Saturday nights), and the American League Championship Series in even-numbered years and the World Series, three Division Series games (also on Tuesday, Friday, and Saturday nights) and the National League Championship Series in odd-numbered years. Fox, which assumed ABC's portion of the league broadcast television rights, gained the rights to the Saturday Game of the Week during the regular season, in addition to alternating rights to the All-Star Game, League Championship Series (the ALCS in odd-numbered years and the NLCS in even-numbered years), Division Series, and the World Series.

Also around this particular period, NBC adapted composer Randy Edelman's theme from the short-lived Fox series The Adventures of Brisco County, Jr. as the main theme music for its baseball telecasts. However, NBC used Edelman's "Emotions Run High" from the film The Big Green as the theme for the network's coverage of the 1996 All-Star Game.

During the Game 1 of the 1996 ALCS between the New York Yankees and Baltimore Orioles at Yankee Stadium, NBC was on hand for an incident in which a 12 year old fan named Jeffrey Maier deflected a batted ball, hit by Yankees shortstop Derek Jeter in the bottom of the eighth inning. Maier clearly reached over the fence separating the stands and the field of play nine feet below and snatched the ball with his glove. Right field umpire Rich Garcia immediately ruled the play a home run, tying the game at 4–4, despite the protest of Orioles right fielder Tony Tarasco and manager Davey Johnson (the latter was ejected in the ensuing argument). The Yankees would go on to win the game in eleventh inning on Bernie Williams' walk-off home run.

In right-field, Tarasco...going back to the track...to the wall...and what happens here?! He contends that a fan reaches up and touches it! But Richie Garcia says no...it's a home run!

— Bob Costas on the call on NBC.

=== 1997–99 ===
Just before the start of NBC's coverage of the 1997 World Series, Don Ohlmeyer, president of NBC's West Coast entertainment division and former executive producer for NBC Sports, came under fire after publicly announcing that he hoped that the World Series would end in a four-game sweep. Ohlmeyer believed that baseball now lacked broad audience appeal (especially in the aftermath of the 1994–95 Major League Baseball strike). As opposed to teams from the three largest television markets (New York City, Los Angeles and Chicago) in the United States, the 1997 World Series featured the matchup of the upstart Florida Marlins and the Cleveland Indians, which made their second World Series appearance in three years. In addition, Ohlmeyer feared that the World Series would disrupt NBC's efforts to attract enough viewers for its new fall roster in order to stay on top of the ratings heap. Ohlmeyer said "If the A&E channel called, I'd take the call." Game 5 fell on a Thursday, which had long been the highest rated night on NBC's schedule, if not on all of television.

Also beginning with the 1997 World Series, NBC would utilize their cable financial channel, CNBC for their post-game analysis programming. NBC was however, criticized over their apparent resistance to showing full line scores. Thus, this cheated viewers who wanted to know which innings runs were scored in. Dick Ebersol of NBC Sports opposed the idea of a score bug, because he thought that fans would dislike seeing more graphics on the screen, and would change the channel from blowout games.

NBC was also criticized for refusing to use split screens of batters and pitchers, thus depriving viewers of a drama-enhancing technique. And its full-screen statistic graphics during the 1997 World Series was accused of blocking the action. And unlike Fox, who ran a scorebox icon in the corner of the screen throughout the game, updating viewers on the score, and the count and the runners on base, NBC only aired its version between pitches. According to NBC producer David Neal, who was in charge of the 1997 World Series production matters "There is no question we know viewers are looking for information, but they don't want it to obscure their view of the game. We have been consistent at NBC that the scorebox is not for us."

The 0-1 pitch...a liner...off of Nagy's glove, into centerfield!!! The Florida Marlins have won...the World Series!!!

— Bob Costas calling Édgar Rentería's series clinching hit in Game 7 of the 1997 World Series.

In 1998, Bob Uecker abruptly left NBC Sports before he got a chance to call the All-Star Game from Coors Field in Colorado. Uecker underwent a back operation in which four discs were replaced. For the remainder of the contract (1998–2000), only Bob Costas and Joe Morgan called the games. Come the 1998 postseason and continuing through the end of their contract in 2000, NBC's pre-game coverage was sponsored by Sun America.

Also in 1998, NBC's coverage of the ALCS was the highest rated for any League Championship Series since before the 1994 strike. NBC averaged a 9.4 rating for the six games, which was a 6% increase than the network's coverage of the 1997 NLCS in the same time slot. The rating was 13% more than Fox's ALCS coverage in 1997 and 12% more than NBC's coverage in 1996.

In 1999, Bob Costas teamed with his then-NBC colleague Joe Morgan to call two weekday night telecasts for ESPN. The first was on Wednesday, August 25 with the Detroit Tigers playing against the Seattle Mariners. The second was on Tuesday, September 21 with the Atlanta Braves playing against the New York Mets. Later that October, Costas and Morgan were on hand at New York's Shea Stadium for the 15 inning long fifth game of the NLCS between the Mets and Braves. The game ended with Mets third baseman Robin Ventura hitting what would become known as a "Grand Slam Single".

A drive to right....back to Georgia! Gone, a grand slam!

— Bob Costas calling Robin Ventura's game winning home run in Game 5 of the 1999 NLCS.

From October 23–27, NBC broadcast their 39th and to date, final World Series. As previously mentioned, unlike NBC's prior two World Series (1995 and 1997), where Bob Uecker was in the booth, Bob Costas and Joe Morgan worked as a duo, as they had done since the 1998 All-Star Game. Hannah Storm again served as pre-game host with Barry Larkin this time, serving as the analyst. The field reporters were Jim Gray (New York Yankees' dugout) and Craig Sager (in the Atlanta Braves' dugout) on loan from Turner Sports.

==== The Jim Gray/Pete Rose interview ====
In 1999, NBC field reporter Jim Gray, who had previously covered Major League Baseball for CBS, came under fire for a confrontational interview with banned all-time hit king Pete Rose. Just prior to the start of Game 2 of the World Series, Gray pushed Rose – on hand (by permission of Commissioner Bud Selig) at Turner Field in Atlanta as a fan-selected member of MasterCard's All-Century Team – to admit to having wagered on baseball games as manager of the Cincinnati Reds ten years earlier. After NBC was flooded with tons of viewer complaints, Gray was forced to clarify his actions to the viewers at home prior to Game 3. Regardless of Gray's sincerity, Game 3 hero Chad Curtis of the New York Yankees boycotted Gray's request for an interview live on camera; Curtis had hit a game-winning home run to send the World Series 3–0 in the Yankees' favor. Curtis said to Gray, "Because of what happened with Pete, we decided not to say anything."

Despite the heavy criticism he received, Gray offered no apology for his line of questioning toward Rose:

I stand by it, and I think it was absolutely a proper line of questioning. I don't have an agenda against Pete Rose. Pete was the one who started asking me questions. I definitely wouldn't have gone (that) direction if he had backed off. My intent was to give Pete an opportunity to address issues that have kept him out of baseball. I thought he might have had a change of heart. He hadn't had an opening in 10 years.

Although Dick Ebersol (then-president of NBC Sports) and Keith Olbermann – among others – have maintained that Gray was simply doing his job, in 2004 Pete Rose would admit to betting on baseball (along with other sports) while he was the manager of the Cincinnati Reds.

=== 2000 ===
In 2000, NBC was caught in the dilemma of having to televise a first-round playoff game between the New York Yankees and Oakland Athletics over the first presidential debate between George W. Bush and Al Gore. NBC decided to give its local stations the option of carrying the debate or the baseball game. If an NBC affiliate decided to carry the debate, then the Pax TV affiliate in their local market could carry the game. NBC also placed a crawl at the bottom of the screen to inform viewers that they could see the debate on its sister channel MSNBC.

On the other end, Fox said that it would carry baseball on the two nights when its schedule conflicted with the presidential or vice presidential debates. NBC spokeswoman Barbara Levin said "We have a contract with Major League Baseball. The commission was informed well in advance of their selecting the debate dates. If we didn't have the baseball conflict we would be televising it." Although there has not been confirmation, anecdotal reports indicated that many NBC affiliates in swing states (such as Michigan, Ohio and Pennsylvania) chose to air the debate over the baseball game. This is an option that CBS affiliates did not have in 1992, when CBS refused to break away from Game 4 of the American League Championship Series (which had gone into extra innings) to the first Clinton–Bush–Perot debate. Like NBC and Fox would do in 2000, CBS cited its contract with Major League Baseball.

During NBC's coverage of the 2000 Division Series between the New York Yankees and Oakland Athletics, regular play-by-play announcer Bob Costas decided to take a breather after anchoring NBC's prime time coverage of the Summer Olympic Games from Sydney. In Costas' place was Atlanta Braves announcer Skip Caray, who teamed with Joe Morgan and Bob Wischusen before Costas' return for the ALCS. It wasn't just Costas but all of NBC's production crews who were down in Sydney. The Olympics ended just two or three days before the MLB playoffs started that year, so the TBS crew worked the Division Series games for NBC.

=== Baseball leaves NBC again ===
In September 2000, Major League Baseball signed a six-year, $2.5 billion contract with Fox to televise Saturday afternoon regular-season baseball games, the All-Star Game and coverage of the Division Series, League Championship Series and World Series. 90% of the contract's value to Fox, which was paying the league $417 million per year, came from the postseason, which not only attracted large audiences, but also provided an irreplaceable opportunity for Fox to showcase its fall schedule. Under the previous five-year deal with NBC (running from 1996 to 2000), Fox paid $115 million ($575 million overall), compared to the $80 million ($400 million overall) that NBC paid. The difference between the Fox and the NBC contracts was that Fox's Saturday Game of the Week was implicitly valued at less than $90 million for five years. Before NBC officially decided to part ways with Major League Baseball (for the second time in about 12 years) on September 26, 2000, Fox's payment would have been $345 million, while NBC would have paid $240 million. NBC Sports president Ken Schanzer said regarding the loss of Major League Baseball rights for the second time since 1990:

We have notified Major League Baseball that we have passed on their offer and we wish them well going forward.

NBC Sports chairman Dick Ebersol added that it was not cost-effective for NBC to be paying out the kind of money that Major League Baseball wanted. NBC was also reportedly concerned over disruptions to its regular fall prime time lineup that would result from having to broadcast the playoffs and World Series. In addition, NBC had several NASCAR races scheduled during the summer.

Ebersol further added:

We walked away from the N.F.L., because it was the right thing to do, and we stayed No. 1 in prime-time in all the important aspects. We walked away from baseball because it was the right thing to do and we don't have to take off our fall shows to show playoff games. The N.B.A. was asking us to lose hundreds of millions of dollars.

The last Major League Baseball game that NBC would televise prior to the Boston Red Sox–Chicago White Sox contest on May 8, 2022, was Game 6 of the 2000 American League Championship Series, occurring on October 17, 2000. In Houston, due to the coverage of the 2000 Presidential Debate, KPRC-TV elected to carry NBC News' coverage of the debate while independent station KNWS-TV carried the ALCS game via NBC.

Joe, time to say goodnight. It has been my good fortune to work with people like Tony Kubek, and "Mr. Baseball" Bob Uecker, and of course you. I've enjoyed it immensely. Best of luck to Joe Buck and Tim McCarver and all the folks at Fox for the upcoming World Series and beyond. And now as we say goodnight from the Bronx, we like to show you the names of the men and women who brought you tonight's game, this year's postseason, and the past few seasons of baseball on NBC. Once again the final score from the Bronx as the Yankees win the pennant...the Yanks, 9 and the Mariners, 7. Coming up next on most of these stations following your late local news, The Tonight Show with Jay Leno. Tonight, Jay welcomes actor Charlie Sheen and the music of PJ Harvey. For Joe Morgan, Jim Gray and Jimmy Roberts, I'm Bob Costas saying so long...from Yankee Stadium. This has been a presentation...of NBC Sports!

— Bob Costas at the end of Game 6 of the 2000 American League Championship Series, NBC's final Major League Baseball telecast for the next 22 years.

During the closing credits of that final game, NBC utilized the ending title theme by Ennio Morricone from the 1987 film The Untouchables.

The loss of Major League Baseball was part of a slow decline for NBC's sports division. This began with its loss of the rights to the NFL's American Football Conference to CBS at the end of the 1997 season. In 2002, NBC lost its NBA rights to ABC. This all culminated in the unproductive 2004–05 prime time season (despite heavy promotion of its lineup during the 2004 Summer Olympics), when NBC carried no major championship sports events during prime time. NBC did, however, acquire the television rights to the National Hockey League in 2004, however the NHL ended up in a lockout that delayed the start of the contract by two years.

In response to NBC's impending loss of NBA coverage to ABC and ESPN in 2002, NBC Entertainment president Jeff Zucker said:

We lost football two years ago, and we stayed a strong No. 1. We lost baseball, and we stayed a strong No. 1. Now we're about to lose basketball, and I believe we'll stay a strong No. 1. The fact is, it's had no impact on our prime time strength. . . NBC can now program all of Sunday nights without going around basketball. I think that's a huge advantage for us. We haven't been able for the last several years to put a program at 8 o'clock (such as American Dreams) because we've had the NBA.

Within two years of NBC losing the NBA rights, NBC dropped to fourth place in the prime time television rankings for the first time in its history, which was also partly the result of a weaker prime time schedule, and would more or less remain there for almost nine years.

In 2001, Bob Costas claimed that despite still loving the game, he now felt a certain alienation from the institution. By the time that NBC lost Major League Baseball for the second time in twelve years, the sport endured a strike, realignment, the introduction of the wild card round, and NBC's complete loss of the regular season Game of the Week. Costas would add that since NBC only did a few games each year and he lacked the forum that he would eventually have (on HBO's On the Record with Bob Costas, Inside the NFL and Costas Now as well as Costas on the Radio) to express his views, he to some extent, started editorializing in games.

When asked about whether or not the fact that NBC no longer had the baseball rights was disappointing, Bob Costas said "I'm a little disappointed to lose baseball, but that's the way the business is. And it's not nearly as disappointing as it was when we lost it at the end of the '80s. Because then it was like baseball was the birthright for NBC. ... (Baseball is) not going to affect any decision that I have in the future. It's nowhere near as devastating as a decade ago. Different circumstances, different time. I miss it a little bit but not a lot. I am very philosophical about this stuff. I have had wonderful opportunities in my career and no one wants to hear me complain about anything." In 2009, Costas would become a contributor and occasional play-by-play announcer for MLB Network.

== Return on Peacock (2022–23) ==
On June 14, 2021, NBC Sports announced they would air a three-game series between the Philadelphia Phillies and the San Francisco Giants nationally on Peacock. The telecasts would represent the first time since 2000 that NBC Sports would produce a nationally televised Major League Baseball game. Jon Miller provided the play-by-play alongside Giants analyst Mike Krukow and Phillies analysts John Kruk and Jimmy Rollins.

On April 6, 2022, Major League Baseball and NBC Sports announced a multi-year deal for Peacock from each participating team. to air an exclusive package of 18 Sunday morning game broadcasts, beginning with a May 8, 2022, broadcast of a Chicago White Sox/Boston Red Sox game at Fenway Park. The games, all of which were hosted by teams in the Eastern Time Zone had, in 2022, scheduled start times of 11:30 a.m. ET for the first six broadcasts (May 8 through June 12), then 12 noon ET from June 19 through September 4. The games were available only on Peacock (except for the May 8 broadcast, which NBC would simulcast), and also included pre- and post-game coverage; exclusive carriage of the All-Star Futures Game (an All-Star Game weekend event featuring minor-league prospects); and access to MLB's vault of highlights, classic games, and documentaries.

The deal with Peacock was the second that MLB reached with a streaming service in 2022, following an agreement announced on March 8 with Apple TV+ to air weekly Friday night doubleheaders.

On April 26, 2022, Andrew Marchand of the New York Post reported that Jason Benetti (who calls the Chicago White Sox games for NBC Sports Chicago, and also worked NBC's telecasts of baseball during the 2020 Summer Olympics) would serve as the lead by-play announcer for the games, joined by rotating analysts from each participating team. Separately, on the same day, NBC announced Ahmed Fareed as the studio host.

When NBC aired the Chicago White Sox-Boston Red Sox game on May 8, 2022, it officially marked 7,873 days since NBC last televised a Major League Baseball game. Jason Benetti broadcast the game alongside Steve Stone, representing the Chicago White Sox and Kevin Youkilis, who represented the Boston Red Sox.

For the 2023 season, NBC simulcast the May 7 game between the Baltimore Orioles and Atlanta Braves in Atlanta. This time, Matt Vasgersian provided the play-by-play duties alongside Andruw Jones, representing the Atlanta Braves and Ben McDonald, who represented the Baltimore Orioles.

Peacock's deal with Major League Baseball ultimately expired following the 2023 season.

== Return (2026–present) ==
On May 21, 2025, it was reported that NBCUniversal made a bid to take over ESPN's deal with Major League Baseball, including Sunday Night Baseball after ESPN and MLB exercised a mutual opt-out on February 20, 2025, to end their agreement following the 2025 season.

On November 19, 2025, Major League Baseball announced short-term national media rights agreements with ESPN, NBC, and Netflix, covering broadcasts and streaming through 2028. The deals, worth nearly $750 million per year, follow ESPN's opt-out from its previous contract and include NBC securing Sunday Night Baseball and the Wild Card round, while Peacock handles Sunday morning games starting March 26, 2026.

On January 22, 2026, NBC Sports announced that it had hired Bob Costas to serve as pregame host for Sunday Night Baseball, marking his return to NBC since leaving the network in 2019.

Among the best days of any baseball season...is Opening Day! When every club has a fresh measure of hope. When the slate is clean. And fans can convince themselves to believe. When everything starts all over again. We have the same feeling! It's been a while, but for generations, this network...was where some of the best moments in history played out. Now, the National Pastime returns...and as the game's greatest voice (Vin Scully) would put it, "Pull up a chair!" It's Opening Day...on NBC!

— Bob Costas during the intro for NBC's telecast of the game between the Pittsburgh Pirates and New York Mets from Citi Field in New York, set to the soundtrack of "Lovely Day" by Bill Withers, on March 26, 2026.

NBC missed the first hour of the Sunday night match-up between the Boston Red Sox and New York Yankees from Boston's Fenway Park on June 28, 2026 due to the network's coverage of the Travelers Championship golf tournament, which ran late and ultimately went to a playoff the following day due to an almost 90 minute weather delay. To clarify, the first pitch of the Red Sox-Yankees game that night was at 7:20 p.m. Eastern Time. NBC didn’t pick up the coverage until approximately 8:28 p.m. By this point, the game was already in the bottom of the fourth inning. During the 68 minutes in between first pitch and picking the game up, NBC forwarded the Sunday Night Baseball coverage to Peacock and NBCSN.

On August 14, 2026, it was officially announced that the 2027 MLB at Field of Dreams game in Dyersville, Iowa would be broadcast on NBC after the 2026 game aired on Netflix.
