= Boxing on NBC =

Boxing on NBC is the de facto title for NBC Sports' boxing television coverage.

== History ==
On July 2, 1921, NBC's future owner RCA and its Hoboken, New Jersey, radio station WJY presented live coverage of the Jack Dempsey vs. Georges Carpentier heavyweight title fight. In the first major sporting event to be broadcast to a regional audience, ringside announcer J. Andrew White called Dempsey's fourth-round knockout victory.

On June 1, 1939, NBC (or technically, WNBT, which would eventually become NBC's flagship affiliate, WNBC) became the first American television network to broadcast a boxing match. Emanating from Yankee Stadium in New York City, Bill Stern provided the blow-by-blow commentary for the fight between Lou Nova and Max Baer.

=== Gillette Cavalcade of Sports ===
The earliest incarnation of NBC's boxing telecasts could be traced back to 1944. Although technically an anthology program, the Cavalcade of Sports was best known for Friday night boxing (from Madison Square Garden) on NBC from 1944 through 1960, and (after NBC decided against featuring boxing due to sensitivity over criminal allegations in the sport) then for several more years on ABC. When Cavalcade of Sports closed up shop on June 24, 1960, after 14-year, it marked the longest continuous run of any boxing program in television history.

On the premiere episode of Cavalcade of Sports (airing on September 29, 1944), NBC broadcast a 15-round bout between Willie Pep and Chalky Wright.

On June 19, 1946, at Yankee Stadium, Joe Louis defeated Billy Conn in the first televised World Heavyweight Championship bout ever. 146,000 people watched it on TV, setting a record for the most seen world heavyweight bout in history. One year later, on December 5, on NBC, Joe Louis defeated Jersey Joe Walcott to retain the world heavyweight title.

On February 14, 1951, Sugar Ray Robinson defeated Jake LaMotta in 13 rounds for the world middleweight title.

On the March 26, 1954, edition of Gillette Cavalcade of Sports from New York City's Madison Square Garden, Al Andrews and Gustav Scholz fought in NBC's first color transmission of a sporting event.

==== Boxing from St. Nicholas Arena ====
Another boxing program, Boxing from St. Nicholas Arena, aired on NBC during the same period (more specifically, from 1946 to 1948) as the Cavalcade of Sports.

=== Sportsworld and partnership with Telemundo ===
On the July 14, 1979, edition of NBC SportsWorld, NBC aired an eight-round long exhibition match from Denver's Mile High Stadium between former Broncos defensive lineman Lyle Alzado and Muhammad Ali. Sam Nover provided the blow-by-blow commentary with Dick Schaap reporting. Two years later on June 25, NBC SportsWorld aired Sugar Ray Leonard's victory in the ninth round against Ayub Kalule to become the WBA World Light Middleweight champion. Marv Albert and Ferdie Pacheco called the action from Houston's Astrodome.

Michael Weisman became the executive producer of NBC Sports in 1982. In boxing, Weisman introduced the three-minute clock on-screen to mark how much time remained in a round and placed microphones in the boxers' corners between rounds.

On May 20, 1985, NBC broadcast in prime time the IBF Heavyweight Championship of the World bout between Larry Holmes and Carl Williams. In what would become NBC's final prime time boxing broadcast for 30 years, Dick Enberg hosted while Marv Albert provided blow-by-blow coverage with analyst Ferdie Pacheco.

In 2003, NBC picked up a package of three bouts from the promotional group Main Events, which aired on May 3, 10 and 17, 2003. All three matches were also aired in Spanish by NBC's sister network, Telemundo. It marked the first time that NBC broadcast professional boxing since 1992 when Sportsworld ended its run after 14 years. The following year, NBC and Telemundo renewed the partnership with a series of five Saturday cards beginning April 17.

=== NBCSN's Fight Night ===
Beginning in 2006, when the NBCSN was known as Versus, they started airing matches from Bob Arum's Top Rank group. Nick Charles was one of the announcers. In 2010, Versus broadcast the World Series of Boxing.

NBCSN's Fight Night series premiered on January 21, 2012, from 2300 Arena in Philadelphia with Kenny Rice and trainer Freddie Roach were on the call and Chris Mannix of Sports Illustrated was the reporter and researcher.

=== Premier Boxing Champions ===
In January 2015, NBC announced that Al Michaels would host ringside along with blow-by-blow man Marv Albert and color commentator Sugar Ray Leonard for the PBC on NBC Saturday night bouts. In partnership with Haymon Boxing, NBC would televise 20 PBC on NBC events (beginning on March 7), including five to be shown in prime time on Saturday nights.

In its review of the inaugural Premier Boxing Champions event on NBC, Bad Left Hook praised the event's on-air production style for feeling more like a "modern," "true mainstream sports show" than the boxing events of HBO and Showtime, along with the performance of Al Michaels, Steve Smoger, and BJ Flores. Marv Albert's performance was panned, noting that he "[missed] a lot of the action", along with Steve Farhood's lack of contributions beyond scoring the fights. Hans Zimmer's soundtrack was also criticized for being "generic" and "[robbing] fighters of their personalities." Bleacher Report was similarly mixed, describing the atmosphere as being too "sterile" for a sport that "thrives on chaos", and that "the bland short walks to the ring and generic music presenting the fighters as interchangeable automatons [are] more NFL than WWE." NBC's on-air talent also received mixed reviews, especially the poor performance of Albert, explaining that "Albert, who hasn't called boxing since 1985, sounded like a guy who hadn't called boxing in 30 years. He struggled to keep up with the action, eventually giving up on play-by-play and occasionally adding a booming 'Yes!' whenever a particularly telling blow landed."

=== Boxxer ===
In October 2023, United Kingdom based boxing promoter Boxxer announced an agreement with NBC Sports. NBC Sports will air select bouts, primarily on its streaming service Peacock, with some also on NBC.

== Commentators ==
- Marv Albert
- Laila Ali
- Teddy Atlas – Atlas worked as a boxing commentator for NBC's coverage of the Olympic Games in Sydney (2000), Athens (2004) and Beijing (2008).
- Al Bernstein – In 1992 and 1996, he served as the boxing analyst for NBC's coverage of the Summer Olympic Games.
- Dave Bontempo
- Nick Charles
- Bob Costas – On March 30, 2015, it was announced Costas would join forces with Marv Albert (blow-by-blow) and Al Michaels (host) on the April 11, 2015 edition of NBC's primetime PBC on NBC boxing series. Costas was added as a special contributor for the event from Barclays Center in Brooklyn. He would narrate and write a feature on the storied history of boxing in New York City.
- Dick Enberg – In 1975, Enberg joined NBC Sports. For the next 25 years, he broadcast a plethora of sports and events for NBC, including the National Football League, Major League Baseball, the National Basketball Association, the U.S. Open golf championship, college football, college basketball, the Wimbledon and French Open tennis tournaments, heavyweight boxing, Breeders' Cup and other horse racing events, and the Olympic Games.
- Ray Forrest – Wearing a tuxedo to intone the formal sign-on when NBC went on the air each evening, Forrest announced every station break and every program. He covered wrestling, boxing, hockey, horse racing, and movie premieres.
- Jim Gray – Gray was a reporter for NBC Sports coverage of Boxing at the 2008 Summer Olympics.
- Sugar Ray Leonard – Leonard has worked as a boxing analyst for ABC, CBS, NBC, ESPN, HBO, and EPIX.
- Chris Mannix – With NBC Sports, Mannix serves as a ringside reporter for Fight Night and a boxing insider for NBC SportsTalk.
- Wally Matthews
- Al Michaels
- Sam Nover – In 1980, Nover signed a contract with NBC Sports with the main intention of working as a boxing commentator at the Moscow Olympics, but was denied the opportunity when the United States boycotted the games. He also worked many venues for NBC SportsWorld, including boxing and was partnered for many years with former Lightweight Champion, Ray "Boom Boom" Mancini and Alexis Argüello.
- Ferdie Pacheco – Pacheco moved on to become a television boxing analyst, working for NBC and Univision. He became Showtime's featured boxing analyst in the early 1980s and continued his association with that network until his retirement from TV in the late 1990s, covering many memorable fights along the way.
- Bob Papa – Papa has worked on NBC's coverage of the Olympics since 1992, as he covered boxing at the most recent Summer Olympics.
- Jimmy Powers
- Freddie Roach
- Kenny Rice – He's worked two Summer Olympics; boxing reporter (2004) and host of Equestrian Competition (2008).
- Fred Roggin – He served as a host for NBC Sports coverage of the 2008 Summer Olympics.
- Tim Ryan – When Ryan's contract with CBS expired in 1998, he moved to Fox and NBC, where Ryan covered NFL games and tennis for Fox and tennis, alpine ski racing, equestrian events, and boxing for NBC.
- Bob Stanton – In 1942, Haymes began work, under the name "Bob Stanton", for the radio show Gillette Cavalcade of Sports. He continued with the program until 1946, when it was turned into a television show on NBC.

== See also ==
- The Contender
- Stroh Brewing Company – For many years Stroh had received little television exposure because of an agreement between the major networks and Anheuser-Busch and Miller Brewing Company which allowed the two top brewers exclusive advertising rights. Stroh fought the agreement and in 1983 was allotted advertising time on ABC's Monday Night Baseball, on two NBC boxing events, and on other popular U.S. television sports shows.
