= Major League Baseball: An Inside Look =

- Genre: News / Baseball Player / Professional Sports / Baseball / Non Fiction
- Developed by: NBC Sports; Major League Baseball Productions
- Directed by: Bucky Gunts; David Stern
- Presented by: See hosts section below
- Starring: See hosts section below
- Country of origin: United States
- Original language: English

Production
- Executive producer: Michael Weisman
- Producers: Les Dennis; Antoinette Machiaverna; David Stern
- Production location: NBC Studios in New York City
- Editors: Rich Domich; Michael Kostel
- Running time: 15 minutes (including commercials)

Original release
- Network: NBC
- Release: April 1979 – September 30, 1989

Related
- Major League Baseball on NBC; Major League Baseball Game of the Week

Major League Baseball: An Inside Look was a pregame show for NBC's Game of the Week telecasts. It featured one-on-one interviews with the players, and other on-going news and notes relating to Major League Baseball (in particular, the upcoming telecast). The program, which was generally 15 minutes long, ran from 1979-1989 (when NBC lost the rights to broadcast Major League Baseball to CBS). An Inside Look typically took place either on-location at the "A" Game of the Week broadcasting site (such as Yankee Stadium for instance) or simply from NBC's studio in New York City.

== Hosts ==
- Marv Albert
- Len Berman
- Gayle Gardner
- Bryant Gumbel
- Bill Macatee
- Ahmad Rashad

== See also ==
- NBA Showtime
- The NFL on NBC Pregame Show
