= Bill Macatee =

American sports broadcaster

Bill Macatee (born November 17, 1955) is a former American sports broadcaster for NBC Sports, CBS Sports, USA Network and Tennis Channel.

== Early life and education ==
Macatee was born in Rome, New York, and grew up in El Paso, Texas. He graduated from Burges High School in El Paso and earned a Bachelor of Science degree from Lamar University in Beaumont, Texas. While in college, Macatee worked at KLTV-TV in Tyler, Texas as well as KTVV-TV in Austin, Texas.

== Career ==
Macatee became Sports Director at KBMT-TV in Beaumont, Texas, where he was hired by Bill Paradoski. Following that he worked at KMBC-TV in Kansas City before spending three years (1979–82) at WFAA-TV in Dallas, Texas. Macatee was hired by NBC Sports in 1982 and worked for NBC News and NBC Sports while based in New York.

Macatee began his network sports broadcasting career with NBC. where he covered a wide range of events including Wimbledon, the Super Bowl, the Rose Bowl and the World Series. He hosted NBC's Major League Baseball Game of the Week pre-game show for four years as well as numerous events for the network's sports anthology show, NBC Sportsworld. Additionally, Macatee served as the sports correspondent for the Today Show and sports anchor for NBC News at Sunrise and Sunday Today. He also co-anchored the syndicated show USA Today on TV.

Macatee joined USA Network as a sportscaster in 1990. From 1991 until 2006, Macatee anchored coverage of the PGA Tour and hosted the network's Thursday/Friday coverage of The Masters from Butler Cabin as well as coverage of the Ryder Cup. His other duties included play-by-play for the U.S. Open Tennis Championships and the French Open at Roland Garros.

Joining CBS Sports in 1995, Macatee served as a tower announcer and handled post-round, network interviews for The Masters and PGA Championship. Macatee also substituted for Jim Nantz during other PGA Tour events and anchored CBS' coverage of the LPGA Championship and various Champions Tour events. In 2015, Macatee hosted the Golf Channel series, Greatest Rounds.

Macatee co-anchored weekend coverage of the 1998 Olympic Winter Games in Nagano, Japan for CBS Sports and also served as a studio host for the 2006 Winter Olympics in Turino, Italy (NBC/USA Network).

In tennis, Macatee was the lead CBS play-by-play announcer for the U.S. Open Tennis Championships (taking over from Dick Enberg in 2012) and other ATP and WTA events.

For 16 years (1998 - 2013) Macatee did play-by-play for the NFL on CBS. He also called NCAA Basketball for CBS Sports including the NCAA Tournament and the NCAA Men's Division II Basketball National Championship Game. Macatee handled network play-by-play in sports as diverse as figure skating, skiing, track-and-field, gymnastics, boxing and even sumo wrestling.

Additionally, Macatee served as the main play-by-play voice and studio host for the cable network Tennis Channel, covering the Australian Open, The French Open (French Open Tonight), Wimbledon (Wimbledon Primetime) and the U.S. Open.

In 2013, Macatee joined The Vistria Group, a Chicago private equity firm, first serving as a Senior Advisor to the firm, then as Partner and Senior Partner. In 2021, Macatee was named Head of Strategic Relationships for Vistria and opened the firm’s office at Old Parkland in Dallas, Texas. Bill has been a Director on multiple privately held company boards, as well as the advisory board of the United States Tennis Association (USTA) Foundation.

In addition, Macatee spent two years as an adjunct professor at Chapman University in Southern California, teaching Sports Media at the Dodge College of Film and Media Arts. Macatee served as a Trustee at Lamar University from 2016 to 2019. He was named Distinguished Alumnus at Lamar University in 2010 and gave the Commencement Address for the university's graduating class in May 2014.

In 2018, Macatee was inducted into the Texas Golf Hall of Fame receiving the Lifetime Achievement Award. He is also in the El Paso (Tx) Sports Hall of Fame and in 2011 was named Grand Marshall of the Sun Bowl Parade. In 2021, Macatee helped Warren Stephens create college golf’s acclaimed Jackson T Stephens Cup, featuring the top men’s and women’s college golf teams in the country. The Stephens Cup has been contested at such iconic venues as Seminole Golf Club (2022), the Alotian Club (2021) and Shore Acres (2025).

Macatee retired from broadcasting after the 2020 Masters Tournament.

== Personal life ==
He is father to Caitlin Macatee, a comedian. In 2014, Macatee married Sonya Lee. They reside in Dallas, Texas.
