= Curt Smith (author) =

American author, media host and columnist

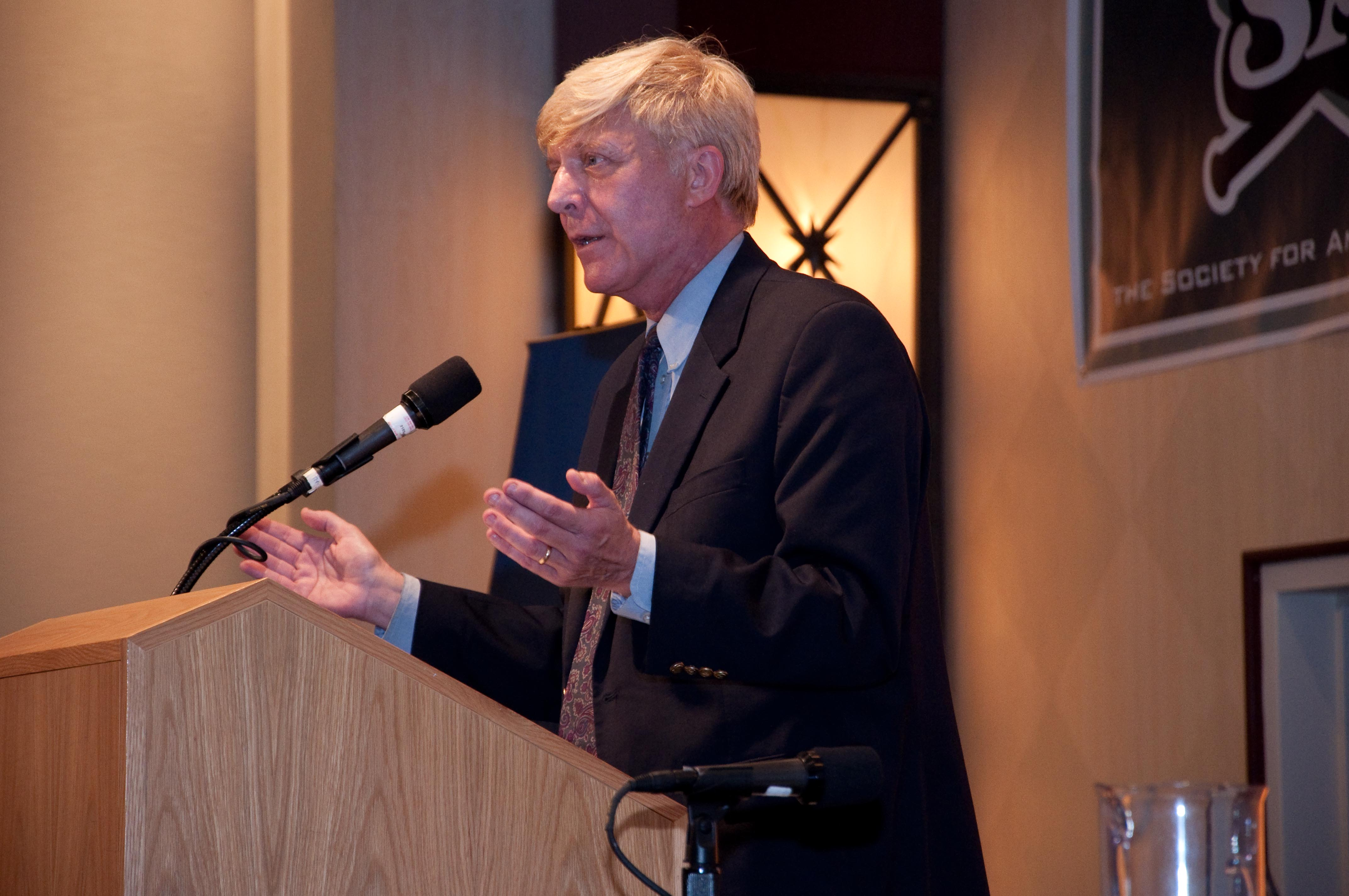
- Born: March 20, 1951 (age 75); Caledonia, New York
- Education: State University of New York at Geneseo
- Occupations: Author, radio and television host
- Writing career
- Subject: Baseball
- Notable work: Voices of the Game
- Website: www.curtsmithauthor.com

Curt Smith (born March 20, 1951, in Caledonia, New York) is an American author, media host and columnist. In addition to work as a newspaper reporter, Smith was a political speechwriter until 1992 and a host of radio and television programs until 2002. He has written 17 books, including Voices of the Game, which covers the history of baseball broadcasting. Smith is a newspaper columnist in upstate New York and holds an academic appointment at the University of Rochester.

== Biography ==
Smith is a 1973 graduate of State University of New York at Geneseo. He worked as a Gannett Company reporter, a speechwriter to former Texas Governor John Connally, and an editor at the Saturday Evening Post. In 1989 he joined the George H. W. Bush Administration as a speechwriter. After Bush's defeat in 1992 Smith lectured at the Smithsonian Institution and then turned to radio and television. From 1994 to 1996 he hosted the Midday Milwaukee talk show on radio station WISN. He also hosted WROC-TV’s Perfectly Clear program from 2000 to 2002 and a 1997–2002 series on the Fox Empire Sports Network.

Currently Smith hosted the weekly Perspectives series on Rochester, New York's NPR affiliate WXXI. The show dealt with politics, pop culture, sports, and other topics. Smith also hosted the twice-weekly Talking Point show on Rochester's CBS affiliate WROC, where he sparred with co-hosts on political and other issues.

Smith is the author of eleven books: Voices of Summer, What Baseball Means to Me, Voices of The Game, Storied Stadiums, Windows on the White House, Our House, Of Mikes and Men, Long Time Gone, A Fine Sense of the Ridiculous, America's Dizzy Dean and The Storytellers. Perhaps his best known book is Voices of The Game, which recounts the history of baseball broadcasting from KDKA's first Pittsburgh Pirates broadcast in 1921 to today's enormous media coverage of the game. A three-part documentary was also made based on the book and has aired on ESPN. His writing style has been highly praised by pundits like Bob Costas, but he has also been criticized for overly florid and sometimes tangled prose.

Smith lives in Rochester with his wife Sarah and their two children. He writes columns for the Messenger-Post newspapers in upstate New York and is a senior lecturer at the University of Rochester.
