= Michael Weisman =

American television producer

- Born: Michael Paul Weisman; January 13, 1950 (age 76); Queens, New York, U.S.
- Education: Queens College
- Occupation: Television Producer
- Spouse: Carol Weisman
- Children: 2

Michael Paul Weisman (born January 13, 1950) is an American television producer, specializing in sports, news and entertainment programs.

== Early life ==
Michael Weisman was born in Queens, NY, the middle of three children to Edward, who was a publicist at ABC and NBC Sports, and Dorothy. During his sophomore year at the University of North Carolina his father died suddenly from a heart attack. Weisman returned to New York and graduated from Queens College in 1971.

== Career ==
=== NBC ===
After college, Weisman became a page in the NBC guest relations program, working on The Tonight Show Starring Johnny Carson when it was filmed in New York.

In 1972, Weisman was hired as the first assistant to the producer in NBC Sports history. He was promoted to associate producer in 1974 and then to producer in 1976, giving him the chance to work with producer Don Ohlmeyer. Weisman became NBC's coordinating producer for baseball in 1979, where he learned baseball production from Harry Coyle, whom Weisman calls his idol and mentor. Weisman was tapped to produce the opening ceremonies and the track and field portions of the 1980 Winter Olympics in Moscow before the U.S. decided to boycott the Games.

Weisman became the executive producer of NBC Sports in 1982.

Weisman led a team covering the 1988 Summer Olympics for the network. One of those employees was (later CNN President) Jeff Zucker, who Weisman hired as a researcher. Weisman considered producing the Olympics a challenge, saying, "my mandate is to shatter the mystique that only ABC can do the Olympics." Weisman assembled the "Seoul Searchers," a group of specialized sports reporters tasked with following breaking news during the Games. Some criticized the journalistic focus to the games. Weisman, however, defended the tone, saying "the criticism we hear is that people want to hear positive news . . . we are not the American team. We are clearly rooting for the American team, but we're not going to whitewash anything." Other ideas Weisman introduced for the Olympics included miniature “point of view cameras” for specific events such as the pole vault and gymnastics; the “Olympic Chronicles,” profiles which highlighted athletes and moments from Olympics past; and an Olympic soundtrack which included an original Whitney Houston song, “One Moment in Time”. NBC won seven Emmy Awards for their Olympic coverage.

In May 1989, Dick Ebersol, the president of NBC Sports, fired Weisman, who had two years left on his contract, and replaced him with Terry O’Neil. Ebersol explained the move, saying he had decided to form his own team and went with O’Neil because of their 20-year association. In November 1989, Weisman was hired by CBS in California to produce the late-night talk show program, The Pat Sajak Show.

In 2001, 12 years after Weisman was fired by Ebersol, the two men reunited to work together on the 2002 Winter Olympics in Salt Lake City.

Weisman returned to New York in 2004, serving as the executive producer for the syndicated daytime Jane Pauley Show for one season.

In 2005, NBC Universal Television Group hired Weisman as the group’s first ever executive producer at large. His first assignment was working with new executive producer Jim Bell on Today.

In 2007, Weisman returned to NBC Sports to serve as the Executive in Charge of Production of Football Night in America.

=== Davis Sports Entertainment and NMT ===
In 1991, Weisman was hired as the president and the executive producer of Davis Sports Entertainment, a division of the Davis Companies, whose president was film producer John Davis and whose owner was former 20th Century Fox owner and Davis Petroleum Chairman, Marvin Davis. The company produced sports programs for network specials, cable, and pay-per-view.

Weisman became president of NMT Productions in 1994.

=== Fox Sports ===
In 1996, Fox Sports asked Weisman to help launch its televised baseball programming. Weisman was hired to produce the 1999 MLB All-Star Game at Fenway Park, which scored an Emmy for Best Live Sports Event; and the 2001 World Series in New York.

=== XFL ===
In 2000, Weisman was recruited by WWE owner Vince McMahon to be a broadcast production consultant for the XFL, which aimed to be a no-holds-barred version of the NFL. The XFL only lasted one season due to poor ratings, but it is credited with several innovations that are used regularly in the NFL today, including putting microphone on players during games and the "sky cam", which spans the length of the field overhead and gives viewers a unique perspective of the game. Weisman, however, first used “sky cam” during the 1983 Orange Bowl.

=== MSNBC ===
In February 2015 Weisman was named the Executive in Charge of MSNBC's Morning Joe.

== Production style ==
Weisman introduced a number of new concepts to sports broadcasting.

In boxing, Weisman introduced the use of the three minute clock on-screen to mark how much time remained in a round and placed microphones in the boxers' corners between rounds.

In football, Weisman created the ten-minute ticker, which was used to display scores from around the league six times an hour. This innovation became the precursor for the score ticker now used in various sports telecasts. He was also responsible for the creation of the "Silent Minute" in the pregame show of Super Bowl XX, during which NBC only showed a black screen with a clock on it. It was the highest-rated minute of pre-game coverage that year. Explaining the concept to The New York Times, Weisman said, "Hey, in the middle of all the hype, let's catch our breath. Change the diapers, make a sandwich. My eyeballs are buggy from all the sports. Let's poke some fun at ourselves and let the screen go blank."

In baseball, Weisman introduced split-screen baseball coverage, which allowed fans to watch two games simultaneously. Weisman also was among the first producers to have baseball players introduce their team lineups, which helped personalize the game for viewers. In 2000, Weisman produced a “turn back the clock game” between the Los Angeles Dodgers and Chicago Cubs to mark the 61st anniversary of the first televised baseball game. The broadcast began in black-and-white, with one camera and no on-screen graphics, and with each inning the broadcast technology advanced.

Weisman told the Los Angeles Times, "I've always had the feeling that if I was curious about something, the public is probably curious too. . . I found in sports that the more chances I took, even if they didn't work out, people liked the fact that we took chances and we tried. Because so much of the business is a copycat business."

Weisman also made a number of notable hires, including the decision to tap regional play-by-play announcer Bob Costas to host the Sunday pre-football game show on NBC in 1984. Costas said: “He gave me a chance to prove myself on big assignments. I hope I made him proud, because I am proud to have worked with him and to have been his friend.”

Weisman hired former Knicks, Giants, and Jets radio broadcaster Marty Glickman to coach former athletes to work as on-air talent. In his autobiography, Glickman shared a story of a middle-aged man approaching he and Weisman and saying, "'I gotta tell you Marty, you're the greatest. And by the way, I love what you're doing with the announcers at NBC.' It gave me great satisfaction to say, 'Sir, meet my boss at NBC, Mike Weisman.'"

It was under Weisman's leadership that the first female announcer reported the play-by-play in a regular season NFL game. Weisman said, "I wanted to break that glass ceiling." He chose Gayle Sierens, a sportscaster turned news anchor, to call the Seattle Seahawks - Kansas City Chiefs game on the final Sunday of the 1987 regular season. Sierens was prepared by Glickman for the broadcast and received positive reviews. Weisman then offered her the opportunity to call six more games, but Sierens chose to focus on her news career instead.

== Awards and honors ==
In total, Weisman received 24 Emmy awards during his career and is a member of the Sports Broadcasting Hall of Fame. He has also produced 23 World Series and MLB Championship Series, and more than a dozen Super Bowl and NFL Championship games.

Weisman was also awarded a lifetime pass by the MLB that guarantees entry to any ballpark in the country for his contributions to televised baseball.

On July 12, 2018, Weisman threw out the ceremonial first pitch for the New York Mets vs. Washington Nationals game at Citi Field to mark the 80th anniversary of Queens College, his alma mater.

== Personal life ==
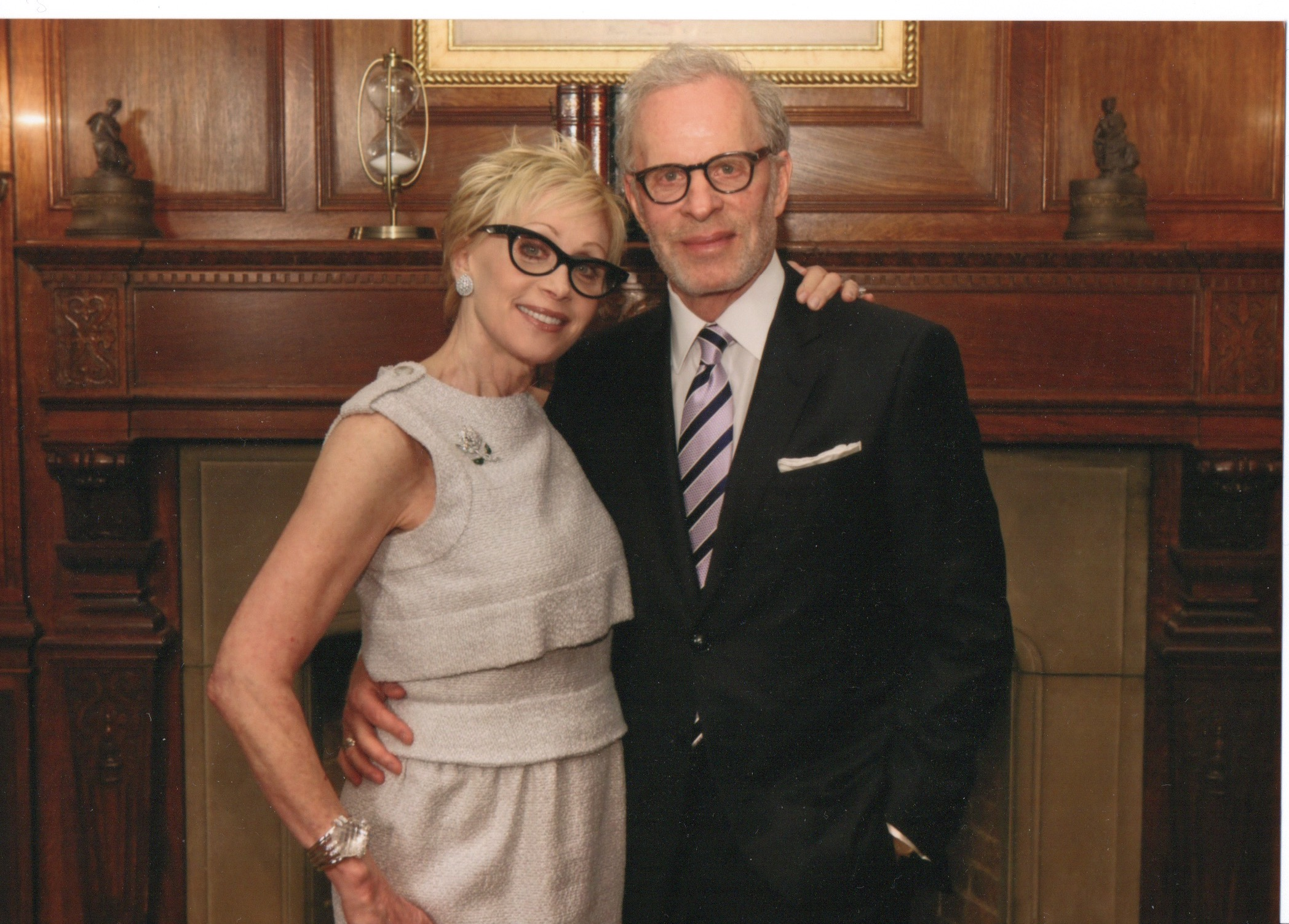
Michael and Carol Weisman

Weisman lives in Manhattan with his wife of 39 years Carol, who is a vice president and partner of Enterprise Asset Management in New York, a board member of the Lupus Research Alliance, and a patron of the Whitney Museum.

They have two children together. Their son Jed is a TV producer in Los Angeles. Their daughter Brett Weisman Heyman is the founder and owner of handbag and accessories company Edie Parker.

They also have three grandchildren.
