= Sportsworld (American TV series) =

- Also known as: NBC SportsWorld
- Genre: Sports anthology series
- Created by: Chet Simmons
- Presented by: (see section)
- Country of origin: United States
- Original language: English
- No. of seasons: 16

Production
- Camera setup: Multi-camera
- Running time: 60 minutes to 3 hours
- Production company: NBC Sports

Original release
- Network: NBC
- Release: January 22, 1978 – 1994

Sportsworld (also known as NBC SportsWorld) is an American sports anthology television program which aired on NBC on Saturday afternoons from 1978 to 1994.

== Format ==
The program presented a wide variety of lower-profile and offbeat sporting events, in the same fashion as ABC's Wide World of Sports, and was generally scheduled to air during the winter and spring following the college football season.

=== Bowling ===
The series covered several professional bowling events throughout its run that were not broadcast as part of the Professional Bowlers Tour on ABC. From 1984 to 1991, it had its own series called The PBA Fall Tour. Jay Randolph and Earl Anthony served as commentators.

From 1988 to 1990, bowling had its own version of the Skins Game called The Bowling Shootout. Four bowlers (three pros and one amateur in the 1989 and 1990) competed. Each frame had a designated value and to win, the bowler on the floor must be the only one to strike, spare or have most pin count to claim the prize. A two-player tie meant all tied, but all players bowled regardless (where there was a game within a game). If it was still tied after the 10th frame, the players would go on to a one ball roll-off. The bowler with the highest monetary prize won the Shootout. In addition, the bowler who threw the most strikes (the game within a game) won a boat. Marshall Holman (who moved on to the roll-off in three consecutive tournaments: with Mark Roth in the 1988 Muskegon, Michigan and the 1989 Reno, Nevada Shootout, and the 1990 tournament in Atlantic City, New Jersey) won all three boats. Brian Voss (who moved on to the roll-off in the 1990 tournament, alongside Holman) was the only bowler to win a frame with a spare.

=== CART ===
SportsWorld aired the CART/PPG Indy Car World Series from 1979 to 1990, serving as the exclusive home of the series during its first four seasons. The Indianapolis 500, which was sanctioned by the United States Auto Club (USAC), was televised by ABC Sports.

=== NASCAR ===
SportsWorld aired the fall race in Charlotte from 1979 to 1981 and the Winston 500 from 1983 to 1985.

== On-air staff ==
=== Hosts ===
Mike Adamle was one of the first, and one of the longest-running hosts of the program. Dick Enberg also appeared regularly during the series' early years.

=== Other commentators ===
- Marv Albert
- Len Berman
- Bart Conner
- Don Criqui
- Donna de Varona
- Steve Evans
- Don Garlits
- Gary Gerould
- Merle Harmon
- Bruce Jenner
- Kathy Johnson
- Charlie Jones
- Paul Lamey
- Sugar Ray Leonard
- Joel Meyers
- Stu Nahan
- Ken Norton
- Dr. Ferdie Pacheco
- Paul Page
- Ahmad Rashad
- Mary Lou Retton
- Johnny Rutherford
- Bobby Unser
