= List of CBS Sports college basketball commentators =

== Present ==
=== Regular season and March Madness ===
- Dan Bonner (game analyst)
- Nate Burleson (studio host)
- Andrew Catalon (play-by-play)
- Seth Davis (studio analyst)
- Spero Dedes (play-by-play)
- Ian Eagle (lead play-by-play)
- Kevin Harlan (play-by-play)
- Grant Hill (lead game analyst)
- Robbie Hummel (game and studio analyst)
- Dana Jacobson (sideline reporter)
- Clark Kellogg (game and studio analyst)
- Steve Lappas (analyst)
- Tom McCarthy (play-by-play)
- Brad Nessler (play-by-play)
- Bruce Pearl (game and studio analyst)
- Bill Raftery (lead game analyst)
- AJ Ross (sideline reporter)
- Jon Rothstein (sideline reporter)
- Jim Spanarkel (game analyst)
- Gene Steratore (rules analyst)
- Wally Szczerbiak (studio analyst)
- Evan Washburn (sideline reporter)
- Tracy Wolfson (lead sideline reporter)
- Adam Zucker (studio host)

=== Regular season only announcers ===
- Pete Gillen (analyst)
- Mike Gminski (game analyst)
- Danny Granger (studio and game analyst)
- Clark Kellogg (game analyst)
- Jordan Kent (play-by-play)
- Chris Lewis (play-by-play)
- John Sadak (play-by-play)
- Rich Waltz (play-by-play)

=== March Madness only announcers ===
- Brian Anderson (play-by-play)
- Debbie Antonelli (game analyst)
- Charles Barkley (lead studio analyst)
- Lisa Byington (play-by-play)
- Jamie Erdahl (studio updates)
- Brendan Haywood (game analyst)
- Jim Jackson (game analyst)
- Ernie Johnson (studio host)
- Andy Katz (sideline reporter)
- Allie LaForce (sideline reporter)
- Adam Lefkoe (studio and game break host)
- Candace Parker (studio analyst)
- Jalen Rose (studio and game analyst)
- Lauren Shehadi (sideline reporter)
- Steve Smith (game analyst)
- Kenny Smith (lead studio analyst)
- Stan Van Gundy (game analyst)

== Past ==
=== Play-by-play ===
- Greg Anthony (game analyst)
- Gary Bender (1981–1986; lead play by play, 1981–1984)
- Carter Blackburn (play-by-play)
- Jay Bilas (game analyst)
- Craig Bolerjack (play-by-play)
- Tim Brando (play-by-play)
- Tim Brant (1986–1990)
- Irv Brown - During the telecast of the March 14, 1982 Idaho-Iowa game, Fred White started this game on play-by-play with Irv Brown as analyst, but White came down with laryngitis a few minutes into the game. So Brown shifted to play-by-play (for the first time ever) and George Raveling (Washington State's head coach) came out of the stands to serve as analyst for the remainder of the game.
- Bob Carpenter
- Don Criqui (play-by-play)
- Jim Durham (1997–1998)
- Mike Emrick (1994–1995)
- Dick Enberg (1999–2010)
- Frank Glieber (1981–1985)
- Mike Gorman (1992–1997)
- Jim Henderson (1990–1991)
- Frank Herzog
- Gus Johnson (play-by-play)
- Sean McDonough (1991–1999)
- Brent Musburger (1985–1990)
- Jim Nantz (1986–2023; lead play by play, 1990–2023)
- Mike Patrick (1986–1987)
- Mel Proctor (1991–1993)
- Bob Rathbun (1988–1989, 1995–1996)
- Ted Robinson (1993–1998)
- Tim Ryan (1982–1998)
- Dave Sims (1993–1995)
- Pat Summerall (1985)
- Michele Tafoya
- Gary Thorne (1996–1997)
- Fred White
- Steve Zabriskie
- Marv Albert

=== Color commentators ===
- Kareem Abdul-Jabbar (2002–2003)
- Stephen Bardo
- Rolando Blackman (1997–2000)
- Dale Brown
- James Brown (1985–1986)
- Quinn Buckner (1988–1993, 1994–1997)
- Doug Collins
- Larry Conley
- Denny Crum - During the 1996 CUSA title game, Al McGuire lost his voice. So CBS got Louisville coach Crum (who was in the arena) to join Tim Ryan on the broadcast crew in relief of McGuire.
- Billy Cunningham (1986–1991)
- Derrek Dickey (1992–1997)
- Larry Farmer (1992–1994)
- Eddie Fogler (2001–2002)
- Bill Foster
- Jack Givens
- Matt Guokas (2001–2004)
- Tom Heinsohn
- Greg Kelser (1993–1998)
- Steve Kerr (2011–2014)
- Al McGuire (1992–1999)
- Ann Meyers
- Reggie Miller
- Billy Packer (1981–2008)
- Digger Phelps (1991–1993)
- Rick Pitino (2000–2001)
- George Raveling (1994–1998)
- Lynn Shackelford
- Jon Sundvold (1996–2002)
- Reggie Theus (1994–1995)
- Bill Walton (2001)
- Bucky Waters (1988–1989)
- James Worthy (1999–2001)

=== Studio hosts ===
- Brent Musburger (1981–1985)
- Jim Nantz (1985–2005)
- Pat O'Brien (1990–1997)
- Sam Ryan (2006–2011)
- Dick Stockton (1984–1985)
- Greg Gumbel (1998–2024)

=== Studio analysts ===
- Quinn Buckner (1994–1996)
- Rex Chapman (2013 NCAA Tournament)
- Mateen Cleaves (2014–2015)
- Mike Francesca (1989–1993)
- Mike Krzyzewski (1993 and 1995 NCAA Tournaments)
- Grant Hill (2014 NCAA Tournament)
- Rick Majerus (1999 NCAA Tournament)
- Digger Phelps (1992–1993)
- Rick Pitino (1994 NCAA Tournament, 2000–2001)
- Bill Raftery
- Dean Smith (1998 NCAA Tournament)
- John Thompson (1993 NCAA Tournament)
- Dwyane Wade
- Jay Wright (2022-2025)

=== Feature reporters ===
- Bonnie Bernstein
- Dan Bonner
- Armen Keteyian
- Michele Tafoya
- Andrea Joyce
- Solomon Wilcots

=== Sideline reporters ===
- Bonnie Bernstein
- Dan Bonner
- Charles Davis
- Jamie Erdahl
- Andrea Joyce
- Armen Keteyian
- Otis Livingston (2012–2014)
- Rachel Nichols (2013-2015)
- Sam Ryan
- Craig Sager (2011–2014)
- John Schriffen
- Lesley Visser (1988-1994, 2004–2012)
- Michele Tafoya
- Solomon Wilcots

== NCAA Tournament commentary crews ==
=== 2010 ===
- Studio Host: Greg Gumbel
- Studio Analysts: Greg Anthony and Seth Davis
1. Jim Nantz/Clark Kellogg/Tracy Wolfson
2. Dick Enberg/Jay Bilas/Sam Ryan
3. Verne Lundquist/Bill Raftery/Lesley Visser
4. Gus Johnson/Len Elmore
5. Kevin Harlan/Dan Bonner
6. Ian Eagle/Jim Spanarkel
7. Tim Brando/Mike Gminski
8. Spero Dedes/Bob Wenzel

=== 2000s ===
==== 2009 ====
- Studio Host: Greg Gumbel
- Studio Analysts: Greg Anthony and Seth Davis
1. Jim Nantz/Clark Kellogg/Tracy Wolfson
2. Dick Enberg or Carter Blackburn/Jay Bilas
3. Verne Lundquist/Bill Raftery/Lesley Visser
4. Gus Johnson/Len Elmore/Sam Ryan
5. Kevin Harlan/Dan Bonner
6. Ian Eagle/Jim Spanarkel
7. Tim Brando/Mike Gminski
8. Craig Bolerjack/Bob Wenzel

==== 2008 ====
1. Jim Nantz/Billy Packer
2. Dick Enberg or Carter Blackburn/Jay Bilas
3. Verne Lundquist/Bill Raftery
4. Gus Johnson/Len Elmore
5. Kevin Harlan/Dan Bonner
6. Ian Eagle/Jim Spanarkel
7. Tim Brando/Mike Gminski
8. Craig Bolerjack/Bob Wenzel

==== 2007 ====
1. Jim Nantz/Billy Packer
2. Dick Enberg/Jay Bilas
3. Verne Lundquist/Bill Raftery
4. James Brown/Len Elmore
5. Gus Johnson/Dan Bonner
6. Kevin Harlan/Bob Wenzel
7. Ian Eagle/Jim Spanarkel
8. Tim Brando/Mike Gminski

==== 2006 ====
1. Jim Nantz/Billy Packer
2. Dick Enberg/Jay Bilas
3. Verne Lundquist/Bill Raftery
4. Gus Johnson/Len Elmore
5. Kevin Harlan/Dan Bonner
6. Ian Eagle/Jim Spanarkel
7. Tim Brando/Mike Gminski and Stephen Bardo
8. Craig Bolerjack/Bob Wenzel

==== 2005 ====
1. Jim Nantz/Billy Packer
2. Dick Enberg/Jay Bilas
3. Verne Lundquist/Bill Raftery
4. Gus Johnson/Len Elmore
5. Kevin Harlan/Dan Bonner
6. Ian Eagle/Jim Spanarkel
7. Tim Brando/Mike Gminski
8. Craig Bolerjack/Bob Wenzel

==== 2004 ====
1. Jim Nantz/Billy Packer
2. Dick Enberg/Matt Guokas
3. Verne Lundquist/Bill Raftery
4. Gus Johnson/Len Elmore
5. Kevin Harlan/Dan Bonner
6. Ian Eagle/Jim Spanarkel
7. Tim Brando/Mike Gminski
8. Craig Bolerjack/Bob Wenzel

==== 2003 ====
1. Jim Nantz/Billy Packer
2. Dick Enberg/Matt Guokas and Kareem Abdul-Jabbar
3. Verne Lundquist/Bill Raftery
4. Gus Johnson/Len Elmore
5. Kevin Harlan/Jay Bilas
6. Craig Bolerjack/Dan Bonner
7. Ian Eagle/Jim Spanarkel
8. Tim Brando/Bob Wenzel

==== 2002 ====
1. Jim Nantz/Billy Packer
2. Dick Enberg/Matt Guokas
3. Verne Lundquist/Bill Raftery
4. Gus Johnson/Dan Bonner
5. Kevin Harlan/Jon Sundvold
6. Ian Eagle/Jim Spanarkel
7. Craig Bolerjack/Bob Wenzel
8. Tim Brando/Eddie Fogler

==== 2001 ====
1. Jim Nantz/Billy Packer
2. Dick Enberg/Bill Walton
3. Verne Lundquist/Bill Raftery
4. Gus Johnson/Dan Bonner
5. Kevin Harlan/Jon Sundvold
6. Ian Eagle/Jim Spanarkel
7. Tim Brando/Rick Pitino
8. Craig Bolerjack/James Worthy

==== 2000 ====
1. Jim Nantz/Billy Packer
2. Dick Enberg/James Worthy
3. Verne Lundquist/Bill Raftery
4. Gus Johnson/Dan Bonner
5. Kevin Harlan/Jon Sundvold
6. Ian Eagle/Jim Spanarkel
7. Tim Brando/Rolando Blackman
8. Craig Bolerjack/Barry Booker

=== 1990s ===
==== 1999 ====
1. Jim Nantz/Billy Packer
2. Sean McDonough/Bill Raftery
3. Verne Lundquist/Al McGuire
4. Gus Johnson/Dan Bonner
5. Kevin Harlan/Jon Sundvold
6. Ian Eagle/Jim Spanarkel
7. Tim Brando/James Worthy
8. Craig Bolerjack/Rolando Blackman

==== 1998 ====
1. Jim Nantz/Billy Packer
2. Sean McDonough/Bill Raftery
3. Tim Brando/Al McGuire
4. Gus Johnson/Jon Sundvold
5. Tim Ryan/Dan Bonner
6. Ian Eagle/Jim Spanarkel
7. Jim Durham/Greg Kelser
8. Ted Robinson/Rolando Blackman

==== 1997 ====
1. Jim Nantz or Bob Carpenter/Billy Packer
2. Sean McDonough/Bill Raftery
3. Tim Ryan/Al McGuire
4. Gus Johnson/Quinn Buckner
5. Gary Thorne/Dan Bonner
6. Tim Brando/George Raveling
7. Mike Gorman/Jon Sundvold
8. Ted Robinson/Derrek Dickey

==== 1996 ====
1. Jim Nantz or Bob Rathbun/Billy Packer
2. Sean McDonough/Bill Raftery
3. Tim Ryan/Al McGuire
4. Gus Johnson/Quinn Buckner
5. Bill Macatee/Dan Bonner
6. Tim Brando/Derrek Dickey
7. Mike Gorman/George Raveling
8. Ted Robinson/Larry Farmer

==== 1995 ====
1. Jim Nantz or Dick Stockton/Billy Packer
2. Sean McDonough/Bill Raftery
3. Tim Ryan/Al McGuire
4. Verne Lundquist/Quinn Buckner
5. Dave Sims/Dan Bonner
6. Mike Emrick/George Raveling
7. Mike Gorman/Ann Meyers
8. Ted Robinson/Derrek Dickey

==== 1994 ====
1. Jim Nantz or James Brown/Billy Packer
2. Greg Gumbel/Bill Raftery
3. Dick Stockton/Al McGuire
4. Verne Lundquist/Dan Bonner or Clark Kellogg
5. Tim Ryan/Ann Meyers
6. Sean McDonough/Derrek Dickey
7. Ted Robinson/Greg Kelser
8. Dave Sims/Larry Farmer

==== 1993 ====
1. Jim Nantz or James Brown/Billy Packer
2. James Brown/Bill Raftery (worked the second weekend only)
3. Dick Stockton/Al McGuire
4. Verne Lundquist/Clark Kellogg
5. Greg Gumbel/Digger Phelps
6. Tim Ryan/Ann Meyers
7. Mel Proctor/Dan Bonner
8. Sean McDonough/Derrek Dickey
9. Mike Gorman/Larry Farmer

==== 1992 ====
1. Jim Nantz/Billy Packer (spent first weekend in studio)
2. Verne Lundquist/Len Elmore
3. Dick Stockton/Al McGuire or Greg Kelser
4. Greg Gumbel/Quinn Buckner
5. James Brown/Bill Raftery
6. Tim Ryan/Digger Phelps
7. Mel Proctor/Dan Bonner
8. Brad Nessler/Ann Meyers
9. Sean McDonough/Bill Walton

==== 1991 ====
1. Jim Nantz/Billy Packer (spent first weekend in studio)
2. Dick Stockton/Billy Cunningham
3. James Brown/Bill Raftery
4. Greg Gumbel/Quinn Buckner
5. Verne Lundquist/Len Elmore
6. Tim Ryan or Jim Henderson/Dan Bonner
7. Brad Nessler/Mimi Griffin
8. Mel Proctor/Jack Givens
9. Sean McDonough/Bill Walton

==== 1990 ====
1. Brent Musburger/Billy Packer (Musburger's last tournament. CBS fired Musburger day before championship game)
2. Dick Stockton/Hubie Brown
3. James Brown/Bill Raftery
4. Greg Gumbel/Quinn Buckner
5. Tim Brant/Len Elmore
6. Brad Nessler/Tom Heinsohn

=== 1980s ===
==== 1989 ====
1. Brent Musburger/Billy Packer
2. Dick Stockton/Bill Raftery
3. Verne Lundquist/Tom Heinsohn
4. Tim Brant/Len Elmore
5. Greg Gumbel/Quinn Buckner
6. Steve Zabriskie/Curry Kirkpatrick

==== 1988 ====
1. Brent Musburger/Billy Packer
2. Dick Stockton/Billy Cunningham
3. Verne Lundquist/Tom Heinsohn
4. Tim Brant/Bill Raftery
5. Tim Ryan/Curry Kirkpatrick

==== 1987 ====
1. Brent Musburger/Billy Packer
2. Dick Stockton/Tom Heinsohn
3. Verne Lundquist/Billy Cunningham
4. Tim Brant/Bill Raftery
5. Mike Patrick/Larry Conley

==== 1986 ====
1. Brent Musburger or Dick Stockton/Billy Packer
2. Gary Bender/Doug Collins
3. Dick Stockton/Larry Conley
4. Verne Lundquist/Larry Conley or James Brown
5. Jim Nantz/Bill Raftery
6. Mike Patrick/James Brown

==== 1985 ====
1. Brent Musburger or Dick Stockton/Billy Packer
2. Gary Bender/Doug Collins
3. Frank Glieber/James Brown (Glieber's last tournament for CBS. Glieber died in May 1985)
4. Verne Lundquist or Pat Summerall/Larry Conley
5. Verne Lundquist/Steve Grote
6. Tim Ryan/Bill Raftery

==== 1984 ====
1. Gary Bender/Billy Packer
2. Frank Glieber/Larry Conley
3. Verne Lundquist/Steve Grote
4. Dick Stockton/Bill Raftery
5. Tim Ryan/Lynn Shackelford
6. Frank Herzog/James Brown

==== 1983 ====
1. Gary Bender/Billy Packer
2. Dick Stockton/Steve Grote
3. Frank Glieber/Irv Brown or Larry Conley
4. Verne Lundquist/Bill Raftery
5. Tim Ryan/Lynn Shackelford
6. Frank Herzog/James Brown

==== 1982 ====
1. Gary Bender/Billy Packer
2. Frank Glieber/Steve Grote
3. Bill Foster/George Raveling
4. Fred White/Irv Brown and George Raveling (Fred White came down with laryngitis. Irv Brown shifted to play by play and Raveling, then coach at Washington State, came out of the stands to serve as analyst.)
5. Verne Lundquist/Dale Brown

=== Regular season commentary crews ===
==== 2022-23 ====
1. Jim Nantz or Tom McCarthy or Brad Nessler or Spero Dedes or Ian Eagle/Bill Raftery or Grant Hill or Jay Wright/Jon Rothstein or Jenny Dell or Tracy Wolfson
2. Ian Eagle or Spero Dedes or Rich Waltz/Jim Spanarkel/Evan Washburn
3. Kevin Harlan or Spero Dedes/Dan Bonner or Avery Johnson/Evan Washburn
4. Rick Waltz or Andrew Catalon or Ian Eagle/Clark Kellogg
5. Andrew Catalon or John Sadak/Steve Lappas
