= Kentucky–Louisville rivalry =

Sports rivalry between the Universities of Kentucky and Louisville

- Kentucky Wildcats Louisville Cardinals
- Sport: basketball, football, others

Locations of Kentucky and Louisville

College Comparison
	Kentucky	Louisville
Founded	1865	1798
Type	Public	Public
Location	Lexington	Louisville
Conference	SEC	ACC
Students	32,955	24,123
School colors		
Nickname	Wildcats	Cardinals
Stadium	Kroger Field	L&N Federal Credit Union Stadium
Arena	Rupp Arena	KFC Yum! Center

The Kentucky–Louisville rivalry refers to the rivalry between the University of Kentucky Wildcats (Kentucky) and the University of Louisville Cardinals (Louisville). It is considered one of the most intense and passionate rivalries in the NCAA, especially in men's college basketball. The intensity of the rivalry is heightened by the proximity of the two schools and the commonwealth of Kentucky's interest in college sports.

== Men's basketball ==
Kentucky–Louisville men's basketball rivalry
- Kentucky Wildcats Louisville Cardinals
- Sport: Basketball
- First meeting: February 15, 1913; Kentucky 34, Louisville 10
- Latest meeting: November 11, 2025; Louisville 96, Kentucky 88
- Next meeting: December 12, 2026

Statistics
- Total meetings: 58
- All-time series: Kentucky leads, 40–18
- Largest victory: Kentucky: 34 points (1948); Louisville: 22 points (1988)
- Current win streak: Louisville, 1 (2025–present)

The Kentucky–Louisville rivalry has been ranked the 2nd best rivalry in college basketball by Bleacher Report and 3rd best rivalry in all of college sports by Basketball Hall of Fame contributor Dick Vitale. Kentucky and Louisville first played against each other in 1913 but stopped playing each other in the 1920s, playing only twelve times between 1913 and 1983. The rivalry went dormant after UK coach Adolf Rupp wanted to stop playing Louisville. Louisville tried numerous times to revive the rivalry to no avail. It wasn't until they were forced to meet in the NCAA Tournament in 1983 dubbed "The Dream Game" which Louisville won that the series was revived. 1983 NCAA tournament. Since then, the two teams have met each year in late December or early January. 2025 will mark the first time that the rivalry game will be the season opener for both teams.

Much like the Iron Bowl, the Kentucky–Louisville rivalry is all the more intense because the two schools have consistently been among the nation's elite men's basketball teams for most of the last 50 years. Both schools are also two of the most victorious programs in NCAA men's basketball history; Kentucky is #1 on the list of all-time winningest programs in Division I Men's Basketball with 127 seasons played and Louisville #30 with 111 seasons played. Kentucky has eight national championships and Louisville three, one having been vacated by the NCAA. Both schools also sit in the top ten of men's basketball teams that have had athletes to be picked in the first round of the NBA draft. Kentucky has had 46 players selected in the first round, while Louisville has had 24.

Two more aspects of the rivalry add even more fuel. Unlike conference rivalries such as Duke–North Carolina, UK and U of L only play once each season. Also, the two schools did not play in the regular season for more than 60 years. According to local Louisville journalist Rick Bozich,

Unlike the Tobacco Road series, one of these programs (Kentucky) once had to be strong-armed into playing the other. I'm not sure how you measure bile but competitive animosity between U of L and UK ranks at the top of the charts — no matter how many times ESPN rolls its Tyler Hansbrough video. Any stories you have heard about folks in the U of L athletic department annually counting the column inches devoted to the U of L and UK football and basketball programs every week in The Courier Journal are absolutely true. So are the stories about folks at Kentucky asking why several Louisville TV stations chose red, not blue, as the color for their official station winter jackets.

=== History ===
The rivalry was fueled when Rick Pitino was hired as Louisville's head men's basketball coach in 2001. He served in that same role with Kentucky from 1989 to 1997. In the time that Rick Pitino was the head coach at Louisville from 2001 to 2017, Kentucky has won 12 of its contests and Louisville has won 6 of its contests. Kentucky leads the all-time series with Louisville 37–17, and Kentucky leads the modern series 28–14. In six tournament meetings as of 2014, Kentucky leads the series four games to two with their most recent win coming in the 2014 sweet sixteen 74–69. The teams met in the 2012 Final Four, and Kentucky defeated Louisville with a score of 69–61 en route to the national title. This was the deepest ever tournament meeting between the two schools and their first tournament meeting since 1984.

=== Results ===
Rankings are from the AP Poll (1936–present)

Kentucky victories	Louisville victories	Tie games	Vacated wins (Note: Louisville has vacated all of its victories from the 2011–12, 2012–13, 2013–14, 2014–15 seasons. These 123 wins are not included in Louisville's all-time record, nor are the victories against Kentucky during this span counted in the series record between the two teams.)

No.	Date	Location	Winner	Score
1	February 15, 1913	Buell Armory Gymnasium	Kentucky	34–10
2	February 7, 1914	Buell Armory Gymnasium	Kentucky	22–17
3	March 3, 1914	Tharp Gymnasium	Kentucky	26–13
4	January 23, 1915	Buell Armory Gymnasium	Kentucky	18–14
5	February 27, 1915	Louisville YMCA	Louisville	26–15
6	February 12, 1916	Buell Armory Gymnasium	Louisville	28–22
7	February 22, 1916	Louisville YMCA	Kentucky	32–24
8	January 17, 1922	St. Xavier Gymnasium	Kentucky	38–14
9	January 21, 1922	Buell Armory Gymnasium	Kentucky	29–22
10	March 27, 1948^{A}	Madison Square Garden	Kentucky	91–57
11	March 20, 1951^{B}	Reynolds Coliseum	No. 1 Kentucky	79–68
12	March 13, 1959^{C}	McGaw Memorial Hall	Louisville	76–61
13	March 26, 1983^{D}	Stokely Athletic Center	No. 2 Louisville	80–68^{OT}
14	November 26, 1983	Rupp Arena	No. 1 Kentucky	65–44
15	March 22, 1984^{E}	Rupp Arena	No. 3 Kentucky	72–67
16	December 15, 1984	Freedom Hall	No. 14 Louisville	71–64
17	December 28, 1985	Rupp Arena	No. 13 Kentucky	69–64
18	December 27, 1986	Freedom Hall	No. 18 Kentucky	85–51
19	December 12, 1987	Rupp Arena	No. 1 Kentucky	76–75
20	December 31, 1988	Freedom Hall	No. 14 Louisville	97–75
21	December 30, 1989	Rupp Arena	No. 8 Louisville	86–79
22	December 29, 1990	Freedom Hall	No. 18 Kentucky	93–85
23	December 28, 1991	Rupp Arena	No. 17 Kentucky	103–89
24	December 12, 1992	Freedom Hall	No. 3 Kentucky	88–68
25	November 27, 1993	Rupp Arena	No. 2 Kentucky	78–70
26	January 1, 1995	Freedom Hall	Louisville	88–86
27	December 23, 1995	Rupp Arena	No. 4 Kentucky	89–66
28	December 31, 1996	Freedom Hall	No. 3 Kentucky	74–54
29	December 27, 1997	Rupp Arena	Louisville	79–76
30	December 26, 1998	Freedom Hall	Louisville	83–74
31	December 18, 1999	Rupp Arena	Kentucky	76–46

No.	Date	Location	Winner	Score
32	January 2, 2001	Freedom Hall	Kentucky	64–62
33	December 29, 2001	Rupp Arena	No. 6 Kentucky	82–62
34	December 28, 2002	Freedom Hall	Louisville	81–63
35	December 27, 2003	Rupp Arena	No. 20 Louisville	65–56
36	December 18, 2004	Freedom Hall	No. 9 Kentucky	60–58
37	December 17, 2005	Rupp Arena	No. 23 Kentucky	73–61
38	December 16, 2006	Freedom Hall	Kentucky	61–49
39	January 5, 2008	Rupp Arena	Louisville	89–75
40	January 4, 2009	Freedom Hall	No. 18 Louisville	74–71
41	January 2, 2010	Rupp Arena	No. 3 Kentucky	71–62
42	December 31, 2010	KFC Yum! Center	No. 11 Kentucky	78–63
43	December 31, 2011	Rupp Arena	No. 3 Kentucky	69–62
44	March 31, 2012^{F}	Superdome	No. 1 Kentucky	69–61
45	December 29, 2012	KFC Yum! Center	No. 4 Louisville	80–77
46	December 28, 2013	Rupp Arena	No. 18 Kentucky	73–66
47	March 28, 2014^{G}	Lucas Oil Stadium	Kentucky	74–69
48	December 27, 2014	KFC Yum! Center	No. 1 Kentucky	58–50
49	December 26, 2015	Rupp Arena	No. 12 Kentucky	75–73
50	December 21, 2016	KFC Yum! Center	No. 10 Louisville	73–70
51	December 29, 2017	Rupp Arena	No. 16 Kentucky	90–61
52	December 29, 2018	KFC Yum! Center	No. 16 Kentucky	71–58
53	December 28, 2019	Rupp Arena	No. 19 Kentucky	78–70^{OT}
54	December 26, 2020	KFC Yum! Center	Louisville	62–59
55	December 31, 2022	Rupp Arena	No. 19 Kentucky	86–63
56	December 21, 2023	KFC Yum! Center	No. 9 Kentucky	95–76
57	December 14, 2024	Rupp Arena	No. 5 Kentucky	93–85
58	November 11, 2025	KFC Yum! Center	No. 12 Louisville	96–88
59	December 12, 2026	Rupp Arena		
Series: Kentucky leads 40–18
† Vacated by Louisville.

==== Notes ====
^{A} 1948 USA Olympic Trial Game
^{B} 1951 NCAA Sweet Sixteen
^{C} 1959 NCAA Sweet Sixteen
^{D} 1983 NCAA Elite Eight
^{E} 1984 NCAA Sweet Sixteen
^{F} 2012 NCAA Final Four
^{G} 2014 NCAA Sweet Sixteen

=== Wins by location ===
Category	Kentucky	Louisville
Evanston, IL	0	1
Indianapolis, IN	1	0
Knoxville, TN	0	1
Lexington, KY	21	5
Louisville, KY	13	11
New Orleans, LA	1	0
New York, NY	1	0
Raleigh, NC	1	0

=== Game MVP ===
NOTE: The 2010 game was the inaugural year for the award. The Bluegrass Sports Commission (BSC) names the Most Valuable Player of the men's basketball game between the University of Kentucky and the University of Louisville.

Date	Player	Team	Position	Statistics
12-31-2010	Josh Harrellson	Kentucky	C	23 Points, 14 Rebounds
12-31-2011	Michael Kidd-Gilchrist	Kentucky	F	24 Points, 19 Rebounds
12-29-2012	Russ Smith	Louisville	G	21 Points, 7 Rebounds
12-28-2013	James Young	Kentucky	F	18 Points, 10 Rebounds
12-27-2014	Tyler Ulis	Kentucky	G	14 Points, 2 Assists
12-26-2015	Tyler Ulis	Kentucky	G	21 Points, 8 Assists
12-21-2016	Quentin Snider	Louisville	G	22 Points, 6 Rebounds, 5 Assists
12-29-2017	Shai Gilgeous-Alexander	Kentucky	G	24 Points, 5 Rebounds, 4 Assists, 3 Steals
12-29-2018	Tyler Herro	Kentucky	G	24 Points, 5 Rebounds, 2 Steals
12-28-2019	Tyrese Maxey	Kentucky	G	27 Points, 7 Rebounds
12-26-2020	Carlik Jones & David Johnson	Louisville	Jones: G Johnson: G	Jones: 20 Points, 5 Rebounds; Johnson: 17 Points, 7 Rebounds
12-31-2022	Jacob Toppin	Kentucky	F	24 Points, 7 Rebounds, 2 Assists
12-21-2023	Antonio Reeves	Kentucky	G	30 Points, 2 Assists, 2 Steals
12-14-2024	Lamont Butler	Kentucky	G	33 Points, 3 Rebounds, 6 Assists
11-11-2025	Mikel Brown Jr.	Louisville	G	29 Points, 2 Rebounds, 5 Assists

=== Broadcast history ===
Date	Network	Play-by-play	Analyst(s)
March 26, 1983	CBS	Gary Bender	Billy Packer
November 26, 1983	WTBS	Skip Caray	Joe Dean
March 22, 1984	NCAA Productions/ESPN	Tom Hammond	Larry Conley
December 15, 1984	Lorimar Sports Network	Tom Hammond	Irv Brown
December 28, 1985	CBS	Brent Musburger	Billy Packer
December 27, 1986	CBS	Brent Musburger	Billy Packer
December 22, 1987	CBS	Brent Musburger	Billy Packer
December 31, 1988	CBS	Tim Brant	Billy Packer
January 2, 2001	ESPN	Bob Carpenter	Larry Conley
December 29, 2001	CBS	Jim Nantz	Billy Packer
December 28, 2002	ESPN	Dan Shulman	Dick Vitale
December 27, 2003	CBS	Gus Johnson	Billy Packer
December 18, 2004	ESPN	Dan Shulman	Dick Vitale
December 17, 2005	CBS	Verne Lundquist	Billy Packer
December 16, 2006	CBS	Verne Lundquist	Billy Packer
January 5, 2008	CBS	Verne Lundquist	Billy Packer
January 4, 2009	CBS	Kevin Harlan	Clark Kellogg
January 3, 2010	CBS	Verne Lundquist	Clark Kellogg
December 31, 2010	CBS	Gus Johnson	Clark Kellogg
December 31, 2011	CBS	Ian Eagle	Clark Kellogg
March 31, 2012	CBS	Jim Nantz	Clark Kellogg; Steve Kerr
December 29, 2012	CBS	Tim Brando	Greg Anthony; Clark Kellogg
December 28, 2013	CBS	Jim Nantz	Greg Anthony
March 28, 2014	CBS	Jim Nantz	Greg Anthony
December 27, 2014	ESPN2	Dan Shulman	Jay Bilas
December 26, 2015	CBS	Tom McCarthy	Bill Raftery
December 21, 2016	ESPN	Dan Shulman	Jay Bilas
December 29, 2017	CBS	Spero Dedes	Bill Raftery
December 29, 2018	ESPN2	Dan Shulman	Jay Bilas
December 28, 2019	CBS	Brad Nessler	Bill Raftery
December 26, 2020	ESPN	Dan Shulman	Dick Vitale
December 31, 2022	CBS	Tom McCarthy	Bill Raftery
December 21, 2023	ESPN	Wes Durham	Jimmy Dykes
December 14, 2024	ESPN	Dan Shulman	Jay Bilas
November 11, 2025	ESPN	Dan Shulman	Jay Bilas

== Football ==
The football rivalry between Kentucky and Louisville started one year earlier than the basketball rivalry but also had a long dormant period. Kentucky and Louisville first played each other in football in 1912 – which was also Louisville's inaugural football season –. Kentucky dominated six meetings between the teams from 1912 until 1924, holding Louisville scoreless in all six games, after which the teams stopped playing. Despite Louisville's persistent efforts to revive the series, Kentucky showed little interest, according to The Courier-Journal. In 1994, under former Kentucky player Howard Schnellenberger, Louisville revived the series after a 70-year hiatus. Kentucky agreed to resume the rivalry only on the condition that the first four games be played in Lexington – a stipulation UofL accepted. Kentucky leads the series currently 19–17 but Louisville leads the Governor's Cup series 17–13.

From 1994 to 2006 the annual matchup was the first game of the season for Kentucky and was the first game for all but two of those years for Louisville. In 2007 Kentucky moved the game to the third game of the season when played in Lexington but remained the first game when played in Louisville. Starting in 2014, which marked Louisville's inaugural season in the Atlantic Coast Conference, the Governor's Cup became the last game of the regular season for both teams to coincide with several other ACC-SEC same-state rivalries.

== Other sports ==
- Women's basketball: Kentucky leads the series 36–24 as of the 2025–26 season. The series dates back to the 1911–12 season, long before Kentucky and Louisville's programs became varsity in 1974–75, from which the series has been continuously active. Kentucky's program was halted by University Senate because it was viewed as a sport that was "too strenuous for girls". It wouldn't return to the University of Kentucky until 1974.
- Women's volleyball: Kentucky leads the series 37–29 as of 2025 in a series that initially was played every year from 1977 to 2005 except in 1981 and resumed in 2009 after a hiatus.
- Men's soccer: The two men's soccer programs have met 37 times. Kentucky leads 18–17–5 as of 2025. On February 21, 2020, it was announced that the two teams would play an exhibition game in the new Lynn Family Stadium. This is the new soccer stadium for Louisville City FC. The match was supposed to be played on April 18, the day of Thunder Over Louisville, however, it was cancelled due to growing concerns of COVID-19.
- Baseball: Kentucky baseball was founded on 1896, with Louisville baseball starting its first season in 1909. As of 2025, Kentucky leads the series 66–50–1 in a series dating back to 1925. In 2017, Louisville won the season series 3–1, including a sweep of Kentucky in the NCAA tournament Louisville Super Regional. Louisville and Kentucky have both found recent success with each team making the College World Series, Louisville having 6 all-time appearances and Kentucky having 1.

== See also ==
- Kentucky Wildcats
- Louisville Cardinals
- Governor's Cup (Kentucky)
- The Rivalry: Red v. Blue
- List of sports rivalries
