= College Basketball on CBS Sports =

American TV series or program

- Current logo as part of CBS Sports' new look launched in January 2021.
- Also known as: NCAA on CBS
- Genre: College basketball telecasts
- Presented by: See List of CBS Sports college basketball commentators
- Theme music composer: Bob Christianson and Trevor Rabin
- Opening theme: "CBS/Turner March Madness Theme"
- Ending theme: "One Shining Moment"
- Country of origin: United States
- Original language: English
- No. of seasons: 44

Production
- Camera setup: Multi-camera
- Running time: 120 minutes or until game ends
- Production company: CBS Sports

Original release
- Network: CBS (1981–present); CBS Sports Network (2006–present)
- Release: November 28, 1981 – present

Related
- NCAA March Madness (CBS and TNT Sports)

College Basketball on CBS Sports (usually referred to on-air as the Road to the Final Four, or simply the NCAA on CBS) is the branding used for broadcasts of men's NCAA Division I basketball games that are produced by CBS Sports, for CBS, CBS Sports Network, and Paramount+.

From 1982 to 2015, CBS Sports obtained broadcast television rights to the NCAA Division I men's basketball tournament, replacing NBC which had been airing the game since 1969. Beginning in the 2016 season, TBS has held the rights to broadcast the NCAA Division I Championship in Men's Basketball in even-numbered years, while CBS continues to air the game in odd-numbered years.

In addition, CBS Sports currently holds broadcasting rights to conference regular season games from the American Conference, Atlantic 10 Conference, Big 12 Conference, Big East Conference, Big Ten Conference, Conference USA, Colonial Athletic Association, Mid-American Conference, Missouri Valley Conference, Mountain West Conference, Patriot League, Atlantic Coast Conference, Southern Conference, and West Coast Conference.

== History ==
=== NIT (1966–1975) ===
From 1966 to 1975, CBS provided national television coverage for selected games from the National Invitation Tournament. Before 1975, the NCAA only allowed one team per conference to play in the NCAA tournament. Therefore, the NIT got many top teams and was considered somewhat comparable in quality to the NCAA Tournament.

In the early part of this era (circa 1966–1968), CBS carried one game on the opening Saturday and the championship game the following Saturday. By 1969, CBS moved their first round coverage from Saturday to Sunday to avoid conflicting with the NCAA tournament coverage on NBC. In the process, the NIT title game went head-to-head with the NCAA consolation game. The same would be true on both counts for the next three years.

In 1973, CBS expanded their NIT coverage to four games. The March 17 Notre Dame vs. USC game went up against an NCAA Tournament game on NBC. Meanwhile, the March 24 Notre Dame vs. North Carolina game went up against the first NCAA Final Four game.

In 1974, CBS went from covering four to covering five games in the NIT. The March 16 doubleheader Maryland Eastern Shore vs. Manhattan and Purdue vs. North Carolina went up against the 1974 NCAA tournament on NBC. Meanwhile, the March 23 doubleheader Purdue vs. Jacksonville and Utah vs. Boston College went head-to-head against the NCAA Final Four.

In 1975, CBS did not cover any NIT games on the first weekend, but did carry the semifinals and finals. The March 22 doubleheader Providence vs. St. John's and Princeton vs. Oregon went head-to-head with the NCAA tournament.

=== 1980s ===
Besides being their first year covering the NCAA tournament, 1982 also marked the first year that the NCAA selection show was broadcast on television.

For their inaugural season, CBS had to scramble to arrange a regular season schedule as NBC still held exclusive rights to certain collegiate conferences. CBS also signed Billy Packer away from NBC to be its top analyst (teaming with play-by-play announcer Gary Bender, and later Brent Musburger and Jim Nantz). Packer also played a key role in helping CBS put together its schedule. In the 1981–82 season, CBS did, however, happen to obtain contracts with the Metro and Missouri Valley Conferences. During the 1982 NCAA tournament, CBS introduced 11:30 p.m. (Eastern Time Zone) games on Thursday and Friday nights for the first two weekends.

CBS also aired an NBA game in the noon timeslot on Sunday, March 14 while only showing a doubleheader of NCAA games. During the telecast of the March 14, 1982 Idaho vs. Iowa game, Fred White started the game on play-by-play with Irv Brown as analyst, but White came down with laryngitis a few minutes into the game. Brown shifted to play-by-play (for the first time ever) and Washington State head coach George Raveling came out of the stands to serve as analyst for the remainder of the game.

Tom Brookshier, who was a play-by-play broadcaster for the NFL on CBS at the time, became the subject of controversy because of a remark he made during a Philadelphia Eagles vs. New Orleans Saints game broadcast on December 11, 1983. After a program note for an upcoming telecast of an NCAA men's basketball game involving the Louisville Cardinals, Brookshier said that the players on the Louisville team had "a collective I.Q. of about 40". This resulted in Neal Pilson, then president of CBS Sports, apologizing to Louisville school officials and later suspending Brookshier for the last weekend of the NFL regular season. Louisville's athletic director, Bill Olsen, felt that the remark was racism, since Louisville's starting five were all African Americans. Brookshier later apologized, calling his remark "stupid" and "dumb," but was angered over CBS's reaction, saying "I'm not about to be judged on one comment." He added, "I've done a lot of things for charity. Now my own network is bailing out on me and taking me off the air. After 20 years at CBS, I deserve better than this." The apology was accepted by the university, as its president, Donald Swain, invited Brookshier to be the featured speaker at the school's annual football kickoff luncheon in Clarksville, Indiana on August 2, 1984. Brookshier was reinstated in CBS's announcing lineup for the 1984 NFL season, continuing as a network commentator through the 1987 NFL season.

For the 1984 NCAA tournament, CBS expanded its coverage on the first Sunday to a triple header. In areas which received the March 23 Wake Forest vs. DePaul game (most of the nation), CBS joined the Georgetown vs. UNLV game in progress (although some stations may have aired a syndicated program at 11:30 and carried the Georgetown vs. UNLV game in its entirety at midnight) around 1:30 a.m. ESPN re-aired the CBS feed of the Georgetown-UNLV game at 2:30 am.

The 1985 NCAA tournament marked the first year that CBS had aired a regional semifinal tournament doubleheader, leaving ESPN with only one live game on each of these nights. Also that year, Brent Musburger took over from Gary Bender in the top CBS play-by-play role (but worked in the studio on the first weekend). Meanwhile, Pat Summerall made a return to basketball play-by-play during the tournament after having not worked any basketball games since the 1974 NBA playoffs. Summerall called second-round tournament games in Atlanta alongside Larry Conley.

In the 1986 NCAA tournament, Jim Nantz made his NCAA tournament play-by-play debut, calling second-round games in Greensboro with Bill Raftery. Back on January 18, Nantz did play-by-play on his first college basketball game for CBS, a regional telecast between Arizona and Miami. One year later, CBS started using Nantz as the studio host for the NCAA tournament.

The 1987 NCAA tournament marked the first year that CBS used the song "One Shining Moment" for its tournament epilogue. 1987 was the last year that CBS aired an NCAA tournament game on broadcast delay (Syracuse vs. Florida from East Rutherford on March 19 at 11:30 p.m. Eastern time; the actual tip-off time was 6:30 p.m.). 1987 would also prove to be the last time that CBS used its #1 announce team (in this case, Brent Musburger and Billy Packer) on two regional finals. Musburger and Packer called the Syracuse vs. North Carolina game in East Rutherford and Indiana vs. LSU game in Cincinnati.

1988 was the first year that CBS televised all regional semifinals. In these years, CBS only came on the air for basketball at 7:30 p.m. ET for basketball in the regions which got the 7:30 game. In essence, most of the country was "in the dark" until 8 p.m. This was also the first year that CBS moved the Final Four games to 5:30 p.m. ET. CBS used Sports Illustrated writer Curry Kirkpatrick as an analyst for the second round. Kirkpatrick teamed with Tim Ryan on the second-round games in Atlanta.

=== 1990s ===
For the 1990 NCAA tournament, CBS expanded its coverage on the first Saturday to show a quadruple header. This particular tournament also marked Brent Musburger's last assignment for CBS. Although Musburger was fired on April Fools' Day (which fell on the Sunday of Final Four weekend that year), he still did play-by-play for the championship game. As previously mentioned, Musburger had done play-by-play (although he worked in the studio for the first weekends) for CBS's coverage of the Final Four since 1985.

During the 1990–91 season, CBS's February 10, 1991 broadcast of a game between UNLV and Arkansas (which, respectively, were the No. 1 and No. 2 college basketball teams in the nation at the time) drew the highest Nielsen ratings for a regular season college basketball game since 1985.

In the 1991 NCAA tournament, CBS assumed responsibility for covering all games of the NCAA tournament, with the exception of the single Tuesday night "play-in" game (the play-in game – between teams ranked as No. 64 and No. 65 seeds – is televised by ESPN, except for the first one, which was aired on then-CBS owned cable channel TNN (now Paramount Network), and used CBS graphics and announcers). For the evening sessions in the first round, CBS only came on the air at 7:30 p.m. for basketball games in the regions which received a 7:30 game broadcast. Otherwise, most of the country was "in the dark" until 8:00 p.m. 1991 was also the first year that the Saturday regional finals started at 3:30 p.m.

The 1992 NCAA tournament also featured the return of Al McGuire to NCAA tournament commentary for the first time since 1981 (NBC's final year broadcasting the tournament). McGuire wasn't sure he could handle four games on the first round, so CBS used Greg Kelser for the afternoon session in Milwaukee alongside Dick Stockton. Meanwhile, this year, CBS again used Jim Nantz and Billy Packer in the studio for the first weekend. It was during the 1992 tournament that CBS televised the now legendary East Regional Final between Duke and Kentucky. With Verne Lundquist and Len Elmore on commentary, this game has since been seen by many as the single greatest college basketball game ever played.

In 1993, CBS adopted their current theme, which has been used in variations ever since (the first update coming in 2004 and the second in 2011). This year, CBS kept Nantz in the studio for the first weekend of the 1993 NCAA tournament, but used Packer on games with a different play-by-play partner (such as James Brown, and subsequently, and Dick Stockton, Bob Rathbun, and Bob Carpenter). CBS would continue this practice until 1998.

The 1995 tournament was the first year that CBS moved the Sunday regional finals to 2:30 p.m. Additionally, evening first round and regional semifinal coverage began airing 30 minutes earlier, at 7:30 p.m. During the 1995–96 season, CBS used a "wheel" concept on selected days, using a set of games with start times that were usually staggered by one hour. For example, CBS might have a game starting at 2:00 p.m., another one at 3:00 p.m., and a third one at 4:00 p.m. Some areas of the country would see the 2:00 p.m. game, then join the middle game in progress around 4:00 p.m. (likely seeing the second half only), and then join the late game in progress around 5:00 p.m. Other areas might see the first half of the 2:00 p.m. game, then see the entire 3:00 p.m. game and then join the late game in progress. CBS would periodically use this concept the next few seasons as well. It would influence how the 2011 selection show was conducted in terms of start times, except by that time, four different networks would be airing games.

1996 was the first NCAA tournament on which Gus Johnson called play-by-play for CBS. Johnson worked with Quinn Buckner on first and second-round games in Indianapolis.

Jim Nantz came down with laryngitis during the January 17, 1998 game between UCLA and Stanford game and sat out on January 18, where Billy Packer was scheduled to work New Mexico at Arizona. CBS had no games on the weekend of February 14 as it was CBS Olympic broadcasts the 1998 Winter Olympics.

Greg Gumbel returned to CBS and became the studio host beginning with the 1998 tournament. CBS started using the team of Jim Nantz and Billy Packer to call games the first weekend. The previous several years, Nantz worked the studio on the first weekend (as was the case with his predecessor, Brent Musburger) while Packer called games with various partners. 1998 also marked first tournament appearance for Ian Eagle, who teamed with Jim Spanarkel in early round games in Sacramento.

1999 served as the first year of the DirecTV Mega March Madness package. This was also the first year that Kevin Harlan called the NCAA tournament and the last year for Al McGuire. Harlan called first-round games in Seattle alongside Jon Sundvold. Meanwhile, McGuire's final tournament game for CBS was the regional final between Duke and Temple at East Rutherford. McGuire worked alongside Verne Lundquist during the 1999 tournament.

=== 2000s ===
In 1999, CBS began broadcasting its coverage of the Final Four in high-definition television. From 2000 to 2004, only one first- or second-round site and one regional site were designated as sites for the high definition broadcasts. In 2005, all regional games were broadcast in HD, and four first- and second-round sites were designated for HD coverage. Local stations broadcasting in both digital television and analog television had the option of airing separate games on their high definition and standard-definition television channels, to take advantage of the available HD coverage.

2000 marked the return of Dick Enberg to NCAA tournament play-by-play after 19 years. Enberg was paired with James Worthy in 2000, Bill Walton in 2001, Matt Goukas from 2002 to 2004, Kareem Abdul-Jabbar along with Goukas in 2003, and Jay Bilas beginning in 2005. Saturday's second round coverage started an hour later at 1:00 p.m., and Saturday's regional final coverage also shifted an hour later to 4:30 p.m. ET.

In 2001, CBS assigned the team of Jim Nantz and Billy Packer to a Thursday/Saturday tournament regional for the first time ever. Also in 2001, the NCAA expanded the tournament to 65 teams and created a Tuesday night "play-in" game on TNN (which was called by Tim Brando and Rick Pitino from Dayton). 2002 had CBS broadcast the Final Four beginning at 6:00 p.m. for the first time. By this time however, the "play-in" game moved to ESPN (this time called by Mike Tirico and Len Elmore).

On March 20 and 21, 2003, CBS provided Iraq War coverage during the afternoon sessions. As a result, ESPN carried the tournament games using CBS announcers. This also led CBS to expand to a quadruple header for its Sunday game broadcasts on March 23. Also, the evening first round and regional semifinal coverage began airing 30 minutes earlier, at the network's current timeslot at 7:00 p.m. That same year, CBS struck a deal with Yahoo! to offer live streaming of the first three rounds of the tournament through its Yahoo! Platinum service, for $16.95 a month.

For 2004, CBS assigned Jim Nantz and Billy Packer to a Thursday through Saturday regional for the third time in four years. This was also the only year that Nantz and Packer worked Thursday through Saturday tournament games on each of the first two weekends. That year, CBS sold access to March Madness On Demand for US$9.95, which provided games not otherwise shown on broadcast television. The service was available for free to AOL subscribers. In 2005, the service charged US$19.95 for a subscription, but offered enhanced coverage of pregame and postgame interviews and press conference.

In 2006, March Madness On Demand was available free of charge, but dropped the coverage of interviews and press conferences. The service was profitable and set a record for simultaneous online streams at 268,000. March Madness On Demand has been available free to online users in all subsequent years.

In addition, College Sports Television (later CBS College Sports Network, now CBS Sports Network) broadcast two "late early" games that would not otherwise be broadcast nationally. These were the second games in the daytime session in the Pacific Time Zone, to avoid starting games before 10:00 a.m. These games are also available via March Madness on Demand and on CBS affiliates in the market areas of the teams playing. In most markets, stations break between 5:00 and 7:00 p.m. Eastern Time for regular late afternoon programming, which consists of local newscasts and the CBS Evening News, as well as any other syndicated programming such as The Oprah Winfrey Show. In areas where The Price Is Right was pre-empted for basketball, the game show aired within this window. CSTV also broadcast the official pregame and postgame shows and press conferences from the teams involved.

Beginning in 2007, all games in the tournament (including all first and second-round games) were available in high definition, and local stations were required to air the same game on both their analog and digital channels. However, due to satellite limitations, first round "constant" feeds were only available in standard definition. Some stations that operate digital television chose not to televise high-definition broadcasts of the first and second rounds and the regional semifinals, and split their signal into digital subchannel to show all games going on simultaneously. Most notably, WRAL-TV in Raleigh, North Carolina provided four separate feeds on its digital signal from 2000 to 2010 in order to show all of the games.

Also in 2007, CBS broadcast all games from each regional site in high definition, however, due to limitations in the CBS Broadcast Center, only the "Flex" feeds were available in HD, constant feeds were in standard definition. Upgrades at the CBS Broadcast Center allowed all feeds, flex and constant, to be presented in high definition for the 2008 tournament. Meanwhile, James Brown returned to NCAA tournament play-by-play for the first time since 1994. Brown however drew very negative reviews for his performance. Consequently, CBS would not use Brown on play-by-play for the 2008 tournament. CBS also aired one first-round game each day on CSTV.

For 2008, CBS moved the Saturday regional final doubleheader to 6:30 p.m. 2008 also marked the last NCAA tournament in which Billy Packer would serve as a color commentator, a run that started in 1974 (he would be replaced by Clark Kellogg for 2009).

=== 2010s ===
Previous logo as part of CBS Sports' new look launched on February 7, 2016. This logo was used until 2021.

Despite CBS's contract to carry the tournament until 2013, the NCAA had the option of ending its agreement with CBS after the 2010 NCAA Division I men's basketball tournament. This led to speculation that ESPN would snag the rights to future tournament games. However, on April 22, 2010, the NCAA signed an NCAA March Madness deal with CBS and the Turner Broadcasting System worth more than $10.8 billion, allowing CBS to continue airing the entire final four through the national championship, with CBS and Turner splitting coverage of earlier rounds in the now 68-team field. Since 2015, the Final Four and national championship alternate between CBS and TBS with the regional semifinals and finals being split between the two networks.

CBS receives the same number of "windows", or time slots, for its tournament coverage as in previous years. However, all games are now nationally – rather than regionally – televised. Both games from a particular section and site are shown back-to-back on the same network each day, except for the second session on March 20, 2011, which was split between CBS and TruTV so that CBS could show 60 Minutes at its regular time, or as close to it as possible. CBS also keeps coverage of the NCAA Division II men's basketball tournament, which is part of the larger contract for this tournament.

In the 2013–14 season, analysts Greg Anthony and Clark Kellogg switched roles, with Anthony moving to the broadcast booth and Kellogg returning to his previous role as a studio analyst. However, on January 17, 2015, halfway through the 2014–15 season, CBS announced Anthony would be suspended indefinitely following his arrest in Washington, D.C. the previous day on charges of soliciting prostitutes.

Under a sub-licensing agreement with its new rightsholder Fox (following their breakaway from the football-playing members, now known as the American Athletic Conference), CBS acquired rights to selected Big East Conference games beginning 2013–14, mainly airing on CBS Sports Network (but with selected games airing on broadcast television). As of the 2019–20 season, CBS will air 20 games per-season, with at least two on broadcast television.

CBS also sublicensed rights to selected Atlantic Coast Conference, Big 12 Conference and Pac-12 Conference games beginning 2012–13 from ESPN.

In 2017, CBS extended its contract with the Big Ten Conference as part of a new, six-year contract, with the network carrying 10 regular-season games per-season, and coverage of the semi-finals and championship games of the Big Ten men's basketball tournament.

=== 2020s ===
In August 2022, CBS renewed its rights to the Big Ten under a seven-year deal beginning in the 2023–24 season that also included rights to Big Ten football; the network will air an increased number of regular-season games, and continue carrying coverage of the semi-finals and championship games of the Big Ten men's basketball tournament, while also adding the championship game of the Big Ten women's basketball tournament. The 2022–23 season would mark the last for Jim Nantz, who would step down after 38 years between the studio and play-by-play to spend time with family (he will continue with his NFL and golf assignments). Ian Eagle, the announcer immediately behind Nantz on the NFL, took over as basketball lead.

In August 2023, CBS announced a new three-year deal with the Summit League. CBS Sports Network will at least six regular season men's basketball games, as well as the semifinals of the women's tournament and the finals of both the men's and women's tournaments. The network also has the ability to add 6 additional men's and women's regular season games.

In September 2024, CBS Sports announced an expanded sublicense agreement with ESPN for the rights to the Big 12 Conference. In addition to the previously aired 6 games on CBS, CBS Sports Network will now air 20 additional basketball games. The agreement also allows CBS to sublicense select Atlantic Coast Conference games from ESPN.

In June 2025, the newly revamped Pac-12 Conference and CBS Sports announced an agreement through the 2030–31 season, beginning with the 2026–27 season. CBS will air at-least three regular season games per season, along with the Pac-12 Conference men's basketball tournament championship. CBS Sports Network will also air select regular season games.

In August 2025, CBS Sports announced an agreement with the Southland Conference for the rights to up to five men's basketball games per season on CBS Sports Network.

== Coverage overview (2010–present) ==
=== March Madness feed overview ===
==== Former ====
Until 2010, CBS broadcast the remaining 63 games of the NCAA tournament proper. Most areas saw only eight of 32 first-round games, seven second-round games, and four regional semifinal games (out of the possible 56 games during these rounds). Coverage preempted regular programming on the network, except during a two-hour window from about 5:00 until 7:00 p.m. Eastern Time when local affiliates were allowed to carry local newscasts and/or syndicated programming. The structure used by CBS resulted in far fewer hours of first-round coverage than under the former ESPN scheduling structure but allows the games to reach a much larger audience than ESPN is able to reach.

CBS provided three sets of feeds from each venue, a "constant" feed, a "swing" feed and a "flex" feed. Constant feeds remained primarily on a given game and were used primarily by stations with local interest in a game. If more than one local team in a given TV market was playing in each window, CBS may sublicense additional coverage of these local games to non-CBS stations. Despite its name, a constant feed would occasionally veer away to other games for brief updates, however, coverage generally remained with the initial game. Swing feeds tended to stay on games of natural interest, such as teams from local conferences, but would go to other games that have close scores. On a flex feed, coverage flipped from one venue to another, depending on the action at the various games in progress. If one game was a blowout, coverage would switch to a more competitive game. Flex games had no natural interest for the stations carrying them, allowing the flex game to be the best game in progress. Station feeds were planned in advance and individual owned-and-operated station and network affiliate stations had the option of requesting either constant or flex feed for various games. All games on DirecTV's Mega March Madness were sourced from the constant feed. In contrast, the regional finals, the national semifinals and the national championship were broadcast throughout the country.

From 2011 to 2013, CBS aired all of its game broadcasts on a national basis. The network aired a total of 26 games in each of the three years (which did not include the games to which Turner Sports held broadcast rights): eight second-round games (four games per day), seven third-round games (four games during the first day and three games on the second due to the network's broadcast of 60 Minutes), four games in the Sweet 16 (two games per day), all four of the Elite Eight games (two games per day), both of the Final Four games and the Championship Game.

In 2014 and 2015, CBS aired all of its game telecasts nationally. The network aired a total of 22 games in each of the two years (not including the games broadcast through Turner Sports' end of the agreement): eight second-round games (four games per day), seven third-round games (four games on the first day and three games on the second to accommodate its airing of 60 Minutes), four games in the Sweet 16 (two games per day), two of the Elite Eight games (both of which were played on a Sunday) and the Championship Game.

==== Current ====
Beginning in 2016 and in subsequent even-numbered years, CBS aired a total of 21 games (not including the games broadcast through Turner Sports' end of the agreement): eight first-round games (four games per day), seven second-round games (four games on the first day and three games on the second to accommodate its airing of 60 Minutes) four games in the Sweet Sixteen (two games per day) and two Sunday Elite Eight games (with the exception of 2016, when the games were played on a Saturday). For odd-numbered years, CBS aired a total of 24 games: eight first-round games (four games per day), seven second-round games (four games on Saturday and three games on Sunday), four games in the Sweet Sixteen (two games per day), two Sunday Elite Eight games, the Final Four, and the National Championship. For the 2021 NCAA Men's College Basketball Tournament, CBS broadcast eight first-round games (played Friday and Saturday), seven second-round games (three on Sunday and four on Monday), four Sweet Sixteen games (played Saturday and Sunday), two Monday Elite Eight games, the Final Four, and the National Championship.

During the postseason, CBS also airs the final of the NCAA Division II men's basketball tournament, and CBS Sports Network airs the final of the Women's National Invitation Tournament.

=== Regular season coverage overview ===
==== CBS ====
- Big Ten Conference
  - Tournament semifinals and championship
- Missouri Valley Conference (Championship Only)
- Atlantic 10 Conference (Championship Only)
- Big 12 Conference
- Big East Conference
- Mountain West Conference
  - Tournament championship
- Pac-12 Conference
- American Conference
- CBS Sports Classic

==== CBS Sports Network ====
- Conference USA
  - Tournament semifinals and championship
- Mountain West Conference
  - Tournament quarterfinals and semifinals
- Atlantic 10 Conference
  - Tournament semifinals
- Big East Conference
- Missouri Valley Conference
  - Tournament semifinal
- Mid-American Conference
  - Tournament semifinals
  - Tournament championship (Women's Basketball)
- Colonial Athletic Association
  - Tournament semifinal and championship
- West Coast Conference
- Patriot League
  - Tournament semifinal and championship
- Northeast Conference
- Southern Conference
- Cancún Challenge
- Emerald Coast Classic
- Veterans Classic
- Jamaica Classic
- Bahamas Championship
- SoCal Challenge
- Hall of Fame Classic
- Sunshine Slam
- Legends of Basketball Showcase

== Results ==
Each year, CBS broadcasts a number of regular-season match-ups from every major conference, in addition to carrying the Big Ten Conference men's basketball tournament.

== Theme music ==
The current theme for CBS's coverage, simply titled "CBS NCAA Basketball Theme," was written by Bob Christianson and has been in use by the network since the 1992–1993 season. While different arrangements have been used over that time, the melody has remained largely the same. The theme has also been used for tournament coverage on TBS, TNT and TruTV as part of its broadcast partnership with CBS. Although this new theme is different from the CBS version, it was originally only used for the NCAA Tournament broadcasts and for CBS coverage of conference tournaments. CBS continued to use the version in use since 2004 as its main theme for its regular-season coverage until the 2021–22 season, when it began using the tournament version of its theme music full-time.

At the end of CBS's coverage, a highlight reel featuring memorable moments from the tournament is shown, set to the song "One Shining Moment" originally written and performed by David Barrett (1987–1993 and 2000–2002), and subsequently covered by Teddy Pendergrass (1994–1999), Luther Vandross (2003–2009 and since 2011) and Jennifer Hudson (2010).

=== Before "One Shining Moment" ===
The following is a list of songs that CBS used during their closing montages from 1982 to 1986:

| Year | Song | Artist |
|---|---|---|
| 1982 | "There's No Stopping Us" | Sister Sledge |
| 1983 | "All Right" | Christopher Cross |
| 1984 | "Whatever We Imagine" | James Ingram |
| 1985 | "Theme from Patton" | Jerry Goldsmith |
| 1986 | "Being Alive" | Barbra Streisand |

| Preceded by NBC | NCAA Men's Division I Basketball Championship television broadcaster 1982–present | Succeeded by Incumbent with TNT Sports (2011–present) |
