= Dan Bonner =

American sports commentator

Current position
- Title: Analyst and color commentator

Biographical details
- Born: July 3, 1953 (age 72); Pittsburgh

Playing career
- 1972–1975: Virginia

Coaching career (HC unless noted)
- 1973–1975: Virginia (assistant)
- 1975–1977: Virginia
- 1978–1979: West Point High School
- 1999–2003: Robert E. Lee High School

Head coaching record
- Overall: 32–20 (.615)

Dan Bonner is an analyst and color commentator covering NCAA men's college basketball. He previously played basketball at the University of Virginia and coached the UVA women's team for two seasons. He also coached girls' basketball and soccer at Robert E. Lee High School in Staunton, Virginia.

== Playing career ==
Dan Bonner, a Pittsburgh native, played at Avonworth High School. He attended the University of Virginia and played basketball from 1971 to 1975. In 1975 he was named captain and was named to the Academic All-Atlantic Coast Conference team.

== Coaching career ==
After his playing career, Bonner was an assistant coach under Barbara Kelly at the University of Virginia for the first two seasons of women's basketball ever played. He succeeded her as head coach in 1975, leading the women's team to a 32–20 (.615) record over two seasons at the helm.

Bonner was head coach for the West Point High School men's basketball team in West Point, Virginia for one season in the 1970s.

He was the assistant athletic director and assistant girls' soccer coach for Robert E. Lee High School (2004–2007), having previously coached the girls' basketball team from 1999 to 2003. He was named the Virginia Group AA Coach of the Year for the 2002–03 season.

== Television career ==
He serves as an analyst for regular-season college basketball games for CBS Sports, ESPN (1987–2001 and 2019-present), and the ACC Network. He has previously called games for Fox Sports and Raycom Sports. Bonner began calling ACC games for Jefferson Pilot Sports in 1983 while a manager at a Social Security office in Staunton, Virginia.

Beginning in 1986, Bonner covered games for NCAA Productions' broadcasts of the NCAA Tournament. Starting with the 1991 NCAA Tournament, Bonner began calling tournament games for CBS. Bonner has worked alongside many partners for the NCAA tournament, but his most frequent pairing has been with Kevin Harlan from 2004 to 2012 and again from 2015-present.

He is quoted as saying, "The Monday after Selection Sunday, I'm scrambling to learn all the teams that I'll have to do later in the week. And then I'm out on the road."

His other broadcasting work includes play-by-play for baseball's Carolina League, women's college basketball, soccer play-by-play and an announcer for The ACC Regional Sports Networks coverage of ACC Baseball.

== Personal ==
Dan is married to the former Terry Israel, who was the team captain and MVP of the 1975–76 Lady Cavaliers team. The Bonners have three children: Coleman, Keary and Sarah.
