= The Rivalry: Red v. Blue =

The Rivalry: Red V. Blue
- Theatrical release poster
- Directed by: Rory Owen Delaney
- Screenplay by: Rory Owen Delaney; Wm. Wade Smith
- Starring: Wm. Wade Smith; Rick Roberts; Rick Pitino; Denny Crum; Ronnie Dee Blaire; John Calipari
- Cinematography: Rory Owen Delaney; Aaron Mikel
- Edited by: Aaron Mikel
- Music by: Matthew Atticus Berger
- Production company: Man Bites Dog Films
- Distributed by: Volar Video
- Release date: December 27, 2013
- Country: United States
- Language: English

The Rivalry: Red V. Blue is a 2013 documentary film directed by Rory Owen Delaney and produced by Wm. Wade Smith. It is the first film to document the famous college basketball's rivalry of the University of Louisville vs. University of Kentucky. The film weaves current events, including back-to-back national championships in 2012 and 2013, with the history of a rivalry game that didn't even exist for decades. From 1959 to 1983, the two basketball teams refused to meet on the hard court.

Red V. Blue features interviews with coaches, players and personalities, including Denny Crum, Joe B. Hall, Derek Anderson, Luke Whitehead, Jim Host and John Y. Brown, among others.

== Synopsis ==
Red V. Blue is a documentary about the instate rivalry between the University of Kentucky and the University of Louisville, the two most prominent universities in the state of Kentucky. The universities are located in the state's two largest cities, respectively the second-largest city of Lexington and the largest city, Louisville, and are separated by 75 miles of Interstate 64. But this is the least of their differences.

The close geographic proximity of the schools to each other has bred an intense rivalry, a rivalry made even more contentious by the national success of both college basketball programs. The two schools have won a combined 11 NCAA Division I basketball championships between them (the University of Kentucky has eight championships and the University of Louisville has three). However, the rivalry between the Wildcats and the Cardinals runs much deeper than geographical proximity.

Unlike many of college basketball's other great rivalries, such as Duke and North Carolina, or Purdue and Indiana, the University of Kentucky and the University of Louisville do not play in the same conference and typically have only one scheduled meeting a year. The rivalry is instead based largely on in-state competition and the cultural prominence of basketball in Kentucky rather than on conference championships.

The Kentucky and Louisville basketball teams met for the first time in 1913 but rarely played each other for the following 70 years. A somewhat improbable matchup in the 1983 Elite Eight between the No. 2 ranked Cardinals and the No.12 ranked Wildcats, however, sent the Bluegrass State in to a frenzy. Fans from both schools refer to this post regular season clash between the two storied programs in 1983 as the "Dream Game." In the game itself, after regulation time ended with Kentucky tying the game at the "buzzer," Louisville went on to dominate the overtime and ran out as comfortable 80–68 winners. This was the defining moment in this rivalry. The result of this game lead directly to the start of the "Battle for the Bluegrass" annual series between the two schools that November. But it took the best personal efforts of the then Governor of Kentucky John Y. Brown, Jr. to put these two universities, separated by 75 miles of freeway, back on the basketball court.

== Cast ==
The film features interviews with Denny Crum, Joe B. Hall, Jim Host, John Y. Brown, Van Vance, Jock Sutherland, Tom Leach, Matt Jones, Mike Rutherford, Russ Smith, Gorgui Dieng, Mayor Greg Fischer, Mayor Jim Gray, Mayor Bob Porter, Terry Howard, Rob Bromley, Ryan Clark, Al Benniger, Jim Tharp, Tony Vanetti, Pat Forde, Derek Anderson, Oscar Combs, Luke Whitehead, Scott Padgett, James Boo Brewer, Peyton Siva, Bill Mike Runyon, Landon Slone, and Attorney Jonathan C. Shaw.

== See also ==
- Kentucky–Louisville rivalry
