= Frank Herzog =

American sportscaster

Frank Herzog is an American former sportscaster known for his role as a play-by-play announcer for Washington Redskins radio broadcasts from 1979 to 2004, where he teamed with Sam Huff and Sonny Jurgensen.

In addition to his Redskins work, Herzog called games for the Washington Bullets, Maryland Terrapins basketball, and college football and basketball on the CBS network. He also worked for a number of Washington, D.C.-area television stations including WUSA (known as WTOP-TV [1950–1978] then WDVM-TV [1978–1986]) and WJLA. Herzog also has had minor parts in a few films, including 2009's State of Play, starring Russell Crowe and Ben Affleck.

He retired from his news anchor job with WTOP radio in March 2010.

== Filmography ==
- Step Up (2006) – Judge Milton
- National Treasure: Book of Secrets (2007) – Frank
- State of Play (2009) – Congressman Johnson (uncredited) (final film role)
