= West Point High School (Virginia) =

Public high school in Virginia, United States

Coordinates: 37°33′27.7″N 76°47′49.5″W

Location
- 2700 Mattaponi Avenue; West Point, (King William County), Virginia 23181; United States

Information
- Type: Public high school
- Principal: Laurel Byrd
- Staff: 34.00 (FTE)
- Enrollment: 440 (2022–23)
- Student to teacher ratio: 12.94
- Colors: Navy and orange
- Nickname: Pointers

West Point High School is a four-year public high school located in West Point, Virginia serving the surrounding geographic area of 6.31 square miles. School aged children living outside the town of West Point are encouraged to apply as tuition students.

West Point High School was voted a Blue Ribbon School in 2012.

West Point is one of just two towns in Virginia to have a School division (terminology for a school district in Virginia) which is independent from the school division of the county in which it is located. (The other town with an independent school division is Colonial Beach, located in Westmoreland County in the Northern Neck region.)
