= Jay Bilas =

American college basketball analyst

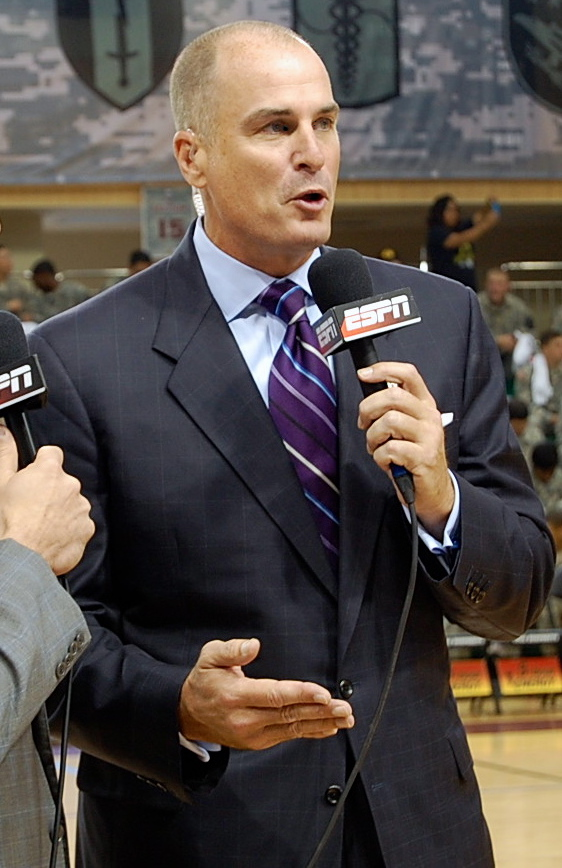
- Bilas on ESPN in 2013

Personal information
- Born: December 24, 1963 (age 62) Rolling Hills Estates, California, U.S.
- Listed height: 6 ft 8 in (2.03 m)
- Listed weight: 225 lb (102 kg)

Career information
- High school: Rolling Hills (Rolling Hills Estates, California)
- College: Duke (1982–1986)
- NBA draft: 1986: 5th round, 108th overall pick
- Drafted by: Dallas Mavericks
- Playing career: 1986–1989
- Position: Center
- Number: 21
- Coaching career: 1989–1992

Career history

Playing
- 1986–1987: Scaligera Basket Verona
- 1987–1988: Basket Mestre
- 1988–1989: Caja de Guipúzcoa

Coaching
- 1989–1992: Duke (assistant)
- Stats at Basketball Reference

Jay Scot Bilas (born December 24, 1963) is an American college basketball analyst who currently works for ESPN. Bilas is a former professional basketball player and coach who played for and served as an assistant under Mike Krzyzewski at Duke University, as well as a practicing attorney in North Carolina. In February 2024, Bilas signed an exclusive partnership agreement with Washington Speakers Bureau (WSB).

== Playing career ==
Bilas was a consensus Top 50 recruit at Rolling Hills High School, in Rolling Hills Estates, California, where he averaged 23.5 points and 13.5 rebounds per game in 1982. That season, Bilas was named First Team All-CIF, First Team All-South Bay, MVP of the Bay League, and Best in the West by the Long Beach Press-Telegram.

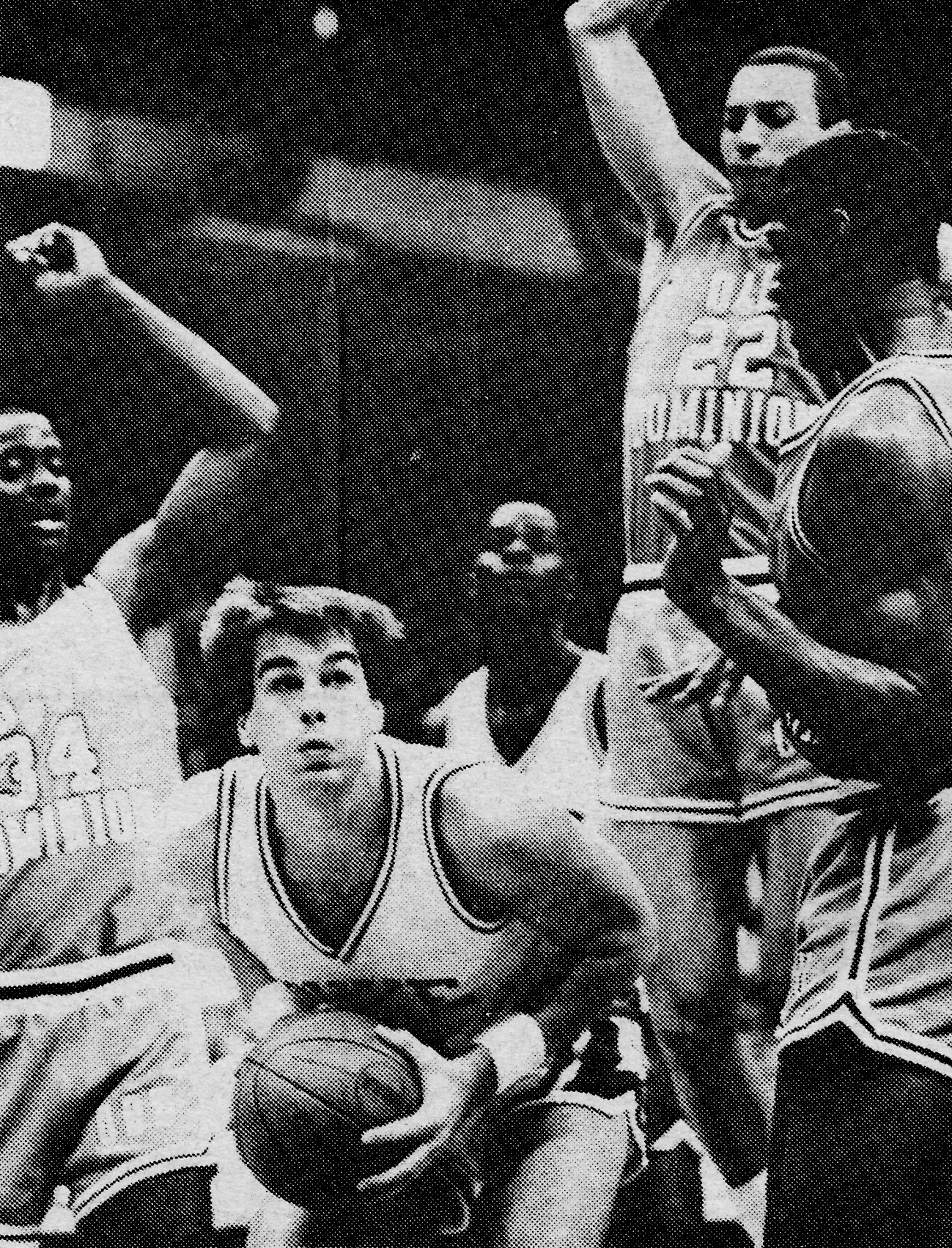
Bilas playing for Duke in the 1986 NCAA tournament

Bilas was a four-year starter for Mike Krzyzewski at Duke University, on the men's basketball team, from 1982 to 1986, and helped lead Duke to the Final Four and National Championship game in 1986. Krzyzewski's 1982 recruiting class of Bilas, Johnny Dawkins, Mark Alarie and David Henderson still ranks as the highest scoring single class in college basketball history. In his college career, Bilas scored 1,062 points and grabbed 692 rebounds, while shooting over 55% from the field.

In 1985, Bilas represented USA Basketball, on the U.S. National Select Team, in the Jones Cup in Taipei, Taiwan.

Bilas graduated in 1986, with a degree in political science, and was selected in the fifth round of the 1986 NBA draft by the Dallas Mavericks but never played for them because he chose to play professionally in Europe (Italy and Spain) for a few years, where he earned substantially more money than he would have in the NBA at that time. He played professionally overseas in Italy's 2nd Division and in Spain's 1st Division.

== Coaching career ==
Bilas served as an assistant coach under Mike Krzyzewski at Duke for three seasons from 1990 to 1992. While serving as an assistant coach, Bilas attended Duke University School of Law, receiving his J.D. degree in 1992. During his three-year tenure as an assistant coach, Duke advanced to three Final Fours and won two National Championships. Bilas still teaches and speaks at clinics, and has been an instructor at the Nike Skills Academy in Beaverton, Oregon, the Nike/Amar'e Stoudemire Skills Academy in Phoenix, Arizona, and the Nike/LeBron James Skills Academy in Akron, Ohio, which annually tutor some of the nation's finest high school and college players. In 2005 and 2006, Bilas was one of 12 coaches taking part in Operation Hardwood I and II that coached United States Service teams in tournament competition in the Middle East. Among the other coaches of Operation Hardwood I and II were Mark Gottfried, Tom Izzo, Kelvin Sampson, Tubby Smith, Rick Barnes, Gary Williams, Dave Odom, Bobby Lutz, Bobby Cremins, Mike Jarvis, Billy Lange, Jim Crews, and Reggie Minton.

== Broadcasting career ==
Bilas has been a color commentator and studio analyst for ESPN since 1995. Bilas began his broadcast career delivering color commentary alongside play-by-play man Bob Harris for the Duke Radio Network in 1993. Bilas joined ESPN in 1995 as a college basketball analyst on games and in the studio. He has served as co-host of ESPN's studio broadcasts since 2000, including College GameNight and College GameDay with Rece Davis, Hubert Davis, Digger Phelps, and Bob Knight. Bilas makes frequent appearances on SportsCenter, ESPNEWS and ESPN Radio, and is a featured basketball writer on ESPN.com. He is also featured as "The Bilastrator" during halftime segments of some ESPN college basketball games.

In 2003, Bilas moved to CBS for its coverage of the NCAA tournament where he worked with Kevin Harlan on one of the network's first weekend broadcast teams. After taking off 2004, Bilas returned for the 2005 tournament where he was paired with Dick Enberg for the first round, second round, and regional round where they handled the broadcasts from Chicago. The two, along with occasional substitute Carter Blackburn, were paired together for the next five tournaments, after which Enberg retired from calling college basketball games and Turner Sports began its partnership with CBS to carry the tournament and began employing their own announcer teams to join CBS'. Bilas remained at ESPN through all of this.

In both 2007 and 2008, Bilas was nominated for an Emmy for Outstanding Performance by a Studio Analyst. He has gained notoriety in the studio for his ability to draw up unique inbound plays after time outs during close games, as well as his stance regarding student athlete payment and his thoughts on the NCAA as a whole. Since 2014, he has been paired with Dan Shulman on ESPN's top college basketball broadcast crew. Bilas was added to ESPN's NBA analyst roster prior to the 2024-25 season.

== Legal career ==
Bilas received his J.D. degree from Duke University School of Law in 1992. He is currently of counsel to the Charlotte office of Moore & Van Allen, where he maintains a litigation practice.

Bilas most notably worked on the case Lyons Partnership v. Morris Costumes, Inc., where he successfully defended the costume business against trademark and copyright claims brought by owners of the popular children's television character Barney the Dinosaur.

=== Comments on Duke lacrosse scandal ===
Writing a letter to the editor in the September 2007 edition of Duke Magazine, Bilas sharply criticized the Duke administration for its lack of support for the falsely indicted players during the 2006 Duke lacrosse case. Describing Richard H. Brodhead's actions, "President Brodhead chose the path of political expediency. He failed to effectively counter factually inaccurate and inappropriate statements about Duke and its students, failed to forcefully speak out against procedural irregularities, and failed to take appropriate action in response to repeated attacks upon the due process rights of Duke's students."

== Personal life ==
Bilas resides in Charlotte, North Carolina, with his wife Wendy, whom he married in 1993, and their son and daughter. Bilas is on the advisory board of the Duke Brain Tumor Center and the PinStripes/ALS Foundation, as well as serving on the Board of Directors of Coaches vs. Cancer.

Bilas joined the Screen Actors Guild in 1987. He appeared in national television commercials and the feature-length movie I Come in Peace (also known as Dark Angel). He wrote a book, Toughness.
