= Larry Conley =

American basketball player

Personal information
- Born: January 22, 1944 (age 82) Ashland, Kentucky, U.S.
- Listed height: 6 ft 3 in (1.91 m)
- Listed weight: 175 lb (79 kg)

Career information
- High school: Ashland (Ashland, Kentucky)
- College: Kentucky (1963–1966)
- NBA draft: 1966: undrafted
- Position: Shooting guard
- Number: 40

Career history
- 1967: Kentucky Colonels

Career highlights
- First-team Parade All-American (1962)
- Stats at Basketball Reference

George Larry Conley (born January 22, 1944) is an American retired professional basketball player.

A 6'3" guard, Conley played college basketball at the University of Kentucky under coach Adolph Rupp. During the 1965–66 season, Conley was a starter on a Kentucky team that also featured Tommy Kron and future Basketball Hall-of-Famers Pat Riley and Louie Dampier. The Wildcats lost the championship game of that season's NCAA tournament 72–65 to Texas Western. This game was the center of the 2006 film Glory Road.

Conley played in the first Kentucky Colonels game of the American Basketball Association before committing to the army. He played 18 minutes and scored two points in his only game. He currently broadcasts college basketball for Fox Sports, after previously performing the same role for ESPN, NBC, CBS, ABC, and Raycom Sports.

== Personal life ==
Conley was born to George and Wanda Conley. His father was a Southeastern Conference basketball official for almost three decades.
